= Mike Mo Capaldi =

American skateboarder (born 1990)

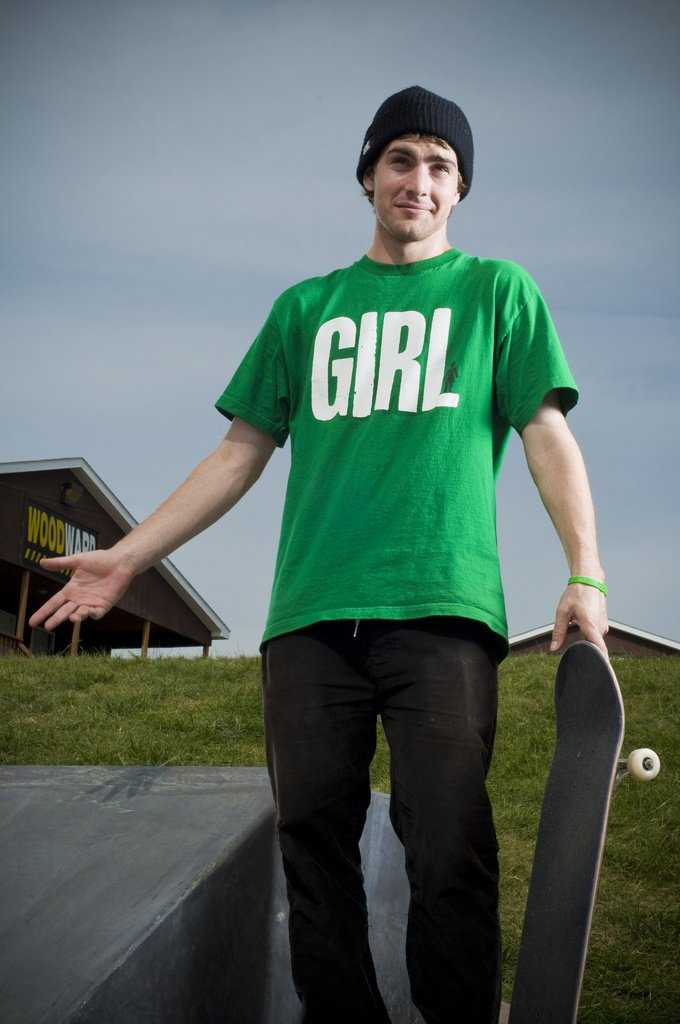
- Capaldi in 2009.
- Born: Michael Capaldi; March 27, 1990 (age 36); Simi Valley, California, U.S.
- Other name: Mike Mo
- Occupations: Professional skateboarder; entrepreneur
- Years active: 2007–present
- Organization: Glassy Sunhaters
- Website: glassysunhaters.com

Michael Capaldi (born March 27, 1990), popularly known as Mike Mo Capaldi, is a professional regular-footed skateboarder who gained popularity following his video part in Forecast, a video produced by professional skateboarder Paul Rodriguez.

== Early life ==
Capaldi originates from Simi Valley, California, and attended Royal High School. Capaldi explained in early 2013 that the "Mo" in his name is a nickname that was given to him by his father while he was a young boy.

After breaking his wrist skating a handrail, Capaldi proceeded to avoid handrail skateboarding and said in a 2013 interview, "I don't like rails."

== Career ==
=== Professional skateboarding ===
Capaldi stated in a 2013 interview that the best thing about his membership with the Girl team is: "Because Girl to me, that's my childhood dream sponsor, so the fact that I'm on my dream sponsor is probably the coolest thing you can have; and Girl is tight as fuck, so."

Capaldi was sponsored by Matix for several years and released signature clothing products with the brand; the brand also produced custom-made singlets for Capaldi's basketball team "The Simi Valley Bierdos".

Capaldi's first pro model shoe was with Lakai. Capaldi resigned from Lakai after the shoe brand emerged victorious from the 2011 "King of the Road" competition run by Thrasher magazine.

In 2011, Capaldi was recruited to the Spitfire skateboard wheels team after a lengthy period of time with a company titled Fillmore that is no longer in existence as of March 2013. As part of his introduction to the team, Capaldi created and published a spoof "sponsor-me" video that is typically reserved for non-sponsored skateboarders.

Following his time with Lakai, Capaldi joined the DC team, alongside other new team riders such as Nyjah Huston and Mikey Taylor.

At the 2012 Agenda trade show, Capaldi's first signature shoe for DC was previewed in three different "colorways". On January 14, 2013, the first MikeMo Capaldi signature DC shoe model was released to the public, accompanied by two online video segments—promotion for the shoe is accompanied by the tagline: "Designed from the Inside Out". On November 1, 2016, it was announced that DC Shoes chose not to renew Mike's contract on October 31. Mike eventually parted ways with the company.

==== Contest results ====
Capaldi won the first Battle at the Berrics after beating Benny Fairfax in a flatground game of "S.K.A.T.E." (a game in which two contestants engage in a "battle", whereby the tricks performed by the lead skater must be repeated by the other skater—letters from the word "skate" are assigned each time a trick is not successfully repeated and the losing contestant is the first skater to complete all of the letters).

Capaldi was selected as a competitor for the Street League competition, founded by professional skateboarder Rob Dyrdek. Capaldi competed alongside other professional skateboarders such as Sean Malto, Paul Rodriguez, Chris Cole, and Luan Oliviera for three seasons.

- ESPN Game Of Skate – 2014
- X-Games Gold medalist for "Real Street" – 2015

==== Recognition ====
The SkateLab indoor skatepark (located in Capaldi's home area of Simi Valley) partnered with the DC company for the "1st Annual Mike Mo Day", held on February 9, 2013. Participants at the event were provided with an opportunity to meet and skate with Capaldi, and free Capaldi DC product was also distributed.

==== Sponsors ====
As of November 2016, Capaldi is sponsored by Girl Skateboards, Royal Trucks, Spitfire wheels, MOB griptape, Bones Swiss bearings, and Diamond Supply Company hardware. Capaldi was a former team member of the Lakai footwear and Matix clothing teams. Mike Mo also co-owns a sunglasses company called Glassy.

=== Glassy Eyewear ===
Capaldi and his brother, Vince, are co-owners and founders of Glassy Sunglasses.

The Glassy sunglasses brand launched its internet store in September 2012, including signature products from Stefan Janoski, Sean Malto, and Mike Mo himself. A signature model for team rider Daewon Song, entitled the "Daeviator", was launched in late 2012.

In May 2013, following a bet between Capaldi and professional skateboarder Chris Cole, the latter became a team rider for the Glassy brand. Capaldi and Cole, who were teammates on the DC Shoes team, agreed that Cole would join the Glassy team if he lost to Capaldi in any contest. The pair competed in the Battle at the Berrics 6 contest on May 18, 2013, and Cole was defeated by Capaldi.

=== Media appearances ===
Capaldi has been featured on Fuel TV's "New Pollution" segment and also appeared on the NBC television network talking about the "Battle at the Berrics" competition.

== Personal life ==
Capaldi resides in Simi Valley, California.

Capaldi's brother, Vince, was diagnosed with "bone cancer", and was scheduled for an operation in 2009 in which a titanium bone substitute would be inserted into his body.

Capaldi explained in a 2013 interview that if he wasn't a professional skateboarder, he would most likely be working in a skate shop or a Foot Locker after failing at basketball.

== Videography ==
- Forecast (2005)
- Girl: Yes We CANada (2006)
- Chocolate: Hittin' Britain & Oui Will Rock You (2006)
- Matix: Forgotten Coast Tour (2007)
- Matix: Ams Going Green Tour (2007)
- Lakai: Fully Flared (2007)
- Streets: LA (2007)
- Girl/Chocolate: Badass Meets Dumbass (2007)
- Lakai: The Final Flare! (2008)
- Girl: Yanks On Planks (2008)
- Lakai: 2010 Video Collection (2010)
- Lakai: Voltage (2010)
- Girl: Outbackwards (2010)
- Thrasher: King Of The Road 2011 (2011)
- Girl/Chocolate: Pretty Sweet (2012)
- DC: Lite in Latin America (2014)

== Video game appearances ==
Capaldi is a playable character in the video game Tony Hawk: Ride.

== See also ==
- Flip tricks
- Mike Carroll
- Spitfire
