= Henry Sanchez =

Henry Sanchez, also known as Henpunt, is a goofy-footed former professional skateboarder from the San Francisco Bay, California. Sanchez gained widespread recognition for his part in Blind Skateboards' "Tim and Henry's Pack of Lies" (1992) with Tim Gavin, Rudy Johnson, Brian Lotti, and Guy Mariano. He appeared on the cover of Thrasher (magazine) in July 1993.From his sponsorship by Spitfire and Thunder, which came about in a humorous and unexpected way, to his appearance on the cover of Thrasher magazine. Henry's influence and skill were impossible to ignore.

== Skateboarding career ==
Henry's career spanned two decades in which he starred in Blind's "Pack of Lies" and a decade later in Transworld's "Sight Unseen". Henry Sanchez along with Mike Carroll and many others served as an impactful pivotal point in skateboarding progression at San Francisco's Embarcadero Plaza. Sanchez and the EMB crew led the way during this highly innovative time in San Francisco skateboarding. Henry was the first person to flip out of a ledge trick. After retiring from skating Sanchez briefly started and ran a clothing company called Magik. Today he works on hotrods and sheet metal fabrication.

== Select videography ==
- Tim and Henry's Pack of Lies" (1992)
- FTC's Finally (1993)
- Plan B's Virtual Reality (1993)
- 20 Shot Sequence (1995)
- 411 Video Magazine #26 FIT Section (1996)
- FIT Credo (1996)
- ICS Video (1999)
- Sight Unseen (2001)
- Chomp on This (2002)
- Got Gold? (2002)
- La Luz (2002)
