= Blind Skateboards =

American skateboard company

- Founded: 1988; 38 years ago
- Headquarters: El Segundo, California, United States
- Key people: Mark Gonzales, Steve Rocco, Jason Lee, Guy Mariano, Bill Weiss, Ronnie Creager, James Craig, Corey Sheppard, TJ Rogers
- Products: Skateboard equipment
- Website: blindskateboards.com

Blind (stylized as bLind) is an American skateboard company founded by Mark Gonzales in 1988 under Steve Rocco under the World Industries umbrella. Gonzales has since left the company and today the company continues under the ownership of Dwindle Distribution. The company produces decks, wheels, soft goods and accessories. The company's logo for many years was a stylized grim reaper.

== History ==
=== 1989–1993: Formation, Video Days, Gonzales departs ===
The name "Blind" was devised as an intentional slight to Gonzales's former sponsor, Vision Skateboards. Upon the brand's launch in 1989, Jason Lee moved from World Industries to Blind as its second professional rider (as founder, Gonzales was the team's first). Blind then signed Rudy Johnson and Guy Mariano, both from Powell Peralta, and Jordan Richter as its vert rider. Danny Way rode for the company for a very brief period of time, and a signature board, featuring a pink-colored car, was designed and released for Way.

Blind released its first video in 1991, entitled Video Days, which featured full-length parts from Gonzales, Mariano, Richter, Lee, and Johnson. The video was filmed and directed by Spike Jonze and is considered one of the most influential skateboarding videos of its era. While filming a second full-length video, Plan B director, Mike Ternasky reviewed progress footage and came to the conclusion that Tim Gavin and Henry Sanchez, also members of the Blind team, were the only two riders who had produced footage of a high enough quality—the release of Tim and Henry's Pack of Lies followed in 1992.

By 1993, the team had grown, with the formal inclusion of new professional riders, Gavin, Sanchez, Brian Lotti, and amateur skater, Jeron Wilson. Lotti, who formerly skated for Planet Earth (founded and owned by professional skateboarder Chris Miller), was recruited by Lee and filmed several tricks for the opening section of Tim and Henry's Pack of Lies. However, in a 2010 interview with the "chrome ball incident" blog, Lotti expressed regret in regard to his departure from Planet Earth, a company that he described as a "small and tight family": "I loved skating with everyone, but I wasn't always psyched on the whole World Industries thing. I definitely felt at times like I blew it with Miller and wished I would have just stayed on Earth... I was really involved there. I had a good thing going."

The company later signed Ronnie Creager from Foundation Skateboards. In late 1993, Johnson, Mariano, Gavin, and Wilson left Blind to join the newly formed Girl Skateboards, and Gonzales had also left by this time, along with Lee—the latter proceeded to form Stereo Skateboards with Chris "Dune" Pastras. Wilson later revealed in a January 2013 interview for the "Weekend Buzz" segment of the YouTube-based RIDE channel that a transfer tape of footage, originally filmed for a Blind video that was never produced, is in existence but has not been released by videographer Socrates Leal, footage of Wilson and Mariano as well among other team riders from the period.

=== 1994–2010: New recruits, What If?, 21st anniversary ===
During the early 1990s, Blind was one of the largest skateboard brands in the world, due to board sales and sales of Blind's jean products. During the 1990s and early/mid-2000s, additional team members, such as Kris Markovich, James Craig, Jake Duncombe, Jake Brown, Corey Shepard, Grant Patterson, Danny Cerezini, and Jani Laitala were recruited by brand manager Bill Weiss. Vert (skateboarding on a vertical "u"-shaped ramp) skateboarder Rob Loirifice was recruited to the team in 2008 and Cerezini was assigned professional status in the same year.

The second full-length Blind video, What If?, premiered in early 2005, and featured parts from Creager, Markovich, Craig, Sheppard, Brown, Duncombe, Aaron Artis, Evan Schiefelbine, Patterson and Carlos Ruiz. The company's third video then premiered in 2009, and featured parts from Morgan Smith, Craig, Cerezini, Patterson, Brown, Lorifice, Creager, Filipe Ortiz, Duncombe and Laitiala.

In 2010, the company celebrated its 21-year anniversary and returned to using the original logo. The company also began to reissue a series of boards from the early 1990s that were based on original shapes—reissued boards included Mariano, Way, Johnson, Gavin, and Sanchez designs.

=== 2010–present: Damn ..., Creager departs, New professionals ===
Former Plan B rider, Sean Sheffey, Filipe Ortiz, Sewa Kroetkov, TJ Rogers, and Yuri Fachini were recruited to the Blind team in the latter half of the first decade of the 21st century. The company's amateur video, This Is Not A Test, was released in 2011, and focused upon team riders who were amateur at the time: Kroetkov, Kieran Reilley, Rogers, Smith, Ortiz and Kevin Romar. Cerezini was featured in the video as a "guest pro."

In an official statement released in April 2012, Brown's departure from the Blind team was announced and a comment from Weiss was included: "Jake Brown is one of the most dynamic, positive and genuine skateboarders I have ever met and been lucky enough to call my friend and I wish him nothing but the best on his next adventure. I cant wait to see what Jake's got up his sleeve next.” (Brown had been a team member for eight years). Cerezini then parted ways with Blind in October 2012.

In 2012, team members, Kevin Romar (who moved to the company in 2009) and Morgan Smith were both assigned professional status. On March 22, 2013, at the Tampa Pro contest in Tampa, Florida, US, Ortiz was presented with his inaugural Blind signature model skateboard deck to signify his introduction into the professional ranks of the company—the graphic on the skateboard deck features a handcuffed mummy figure with the facial section of the bandages peeled away.

Cody McEntire, a Texan skateboarder who was formerly a team member of the Think Skateboards brand, was recruited to the Blind team in March 2013. McEntire explained the process of joining the Blind team in a TransWorld Skateboarding "Roll Call" interview:

I’ve known [Bill] Weiss [Blind brand manager] for a while because we worked together on the Digital Smoke And Mirrors video. I was always stoked on how down he was for skating. One day I called him and told him I was really stoked on Blind and just wanted to see if anything would be possible with it. A few weeks later we sat down and talked and it worked out. It was crazy how fast it happened. I'm glad it all worked out because now I feel like I'm exactly where I want to be.

In April 2013, Duncombe left the company to ride for Life Extension (LE) Skateboards and announced the news on his Instagram profile: "Just want to thank everyone at blind for helping me out for all those years and putting up with my shit and to let everyone know LE is my new family!!!" A photograph of Duncombe with a bottle of beer that is above a forum post that reads "LE, where formerly great pros go to die" served as the official press release for LE. Duncombe later explained in December 2013: "There were a couple of times when I'd thought about quitting but didn't due to loyalty. But at the end of the day new kids come in and older guys get let go."

The full-length video Damn ... was released on May 27, 2014, after more than two years of daily filming, and was co-directed by Weiss and English filmer Mike Manzoori. The video features Kevin Romar, Ronnie Creager, Yuri Facchini, Cody McEntire, Morgan Smith, TJ Rogers, Sewa Kroetkev, and Filipe Ortiz, and was filmed in numerous global cities, including Barcelona, Spain; Toronto, Canada; Amsterdam, the Netherlands; and Sacramento, U.S. The Blind brand released a new product line in early July 2013 and published a video advertisement on its YouTube channel on July 9, 2013. Under the heading "A damn good deal!", Blind promoted a new line of skateboard decks constructed from North American maple and resin glue with a retail price of US$29.95.

In March 2014, longtime team rider Creager announced his departure from Blind after more than 20 years with the company. In the official press release, released on March 13, Blind stated: "We cant thank Ronnie enough for all his contributions, memories and fun times over the years. We wish Ronnie nothing but the best and look forward to seeing more amazing skating from him in the future.” As of September 28, 2014, Creager was not yet associated with a new skateboard deck sponsor.

Rogers was assigned professional status in August 2014 after his "Recruit" video part was published on the Berrics website in late July. Blind released a limited edition skateboard deck, designed in collaboration with the Berrics, which were signed by Rogers. The decks sold out within their first day of availability. Blind released a two-part video on September 15, 2014, in which Facchini and Rogers were the only skateboarders featured. Manzoori was again enlisted for the project, entitled X2 Vision, and premieres were held in 18 cities internationally.

Kroetkov was then assigned professional status in September 2014, during a team event at the Lafayette skate park in Los Angeles, California, U.S., on September 22. A "Subject" segment was published on the Berrics website the following day, in which new street-based footage of Sewa was featured.

== Team ==
=== Pro ===
- Micky Papa
- Sora Shirai
- Jake Ilardi

=== Amateur ===
- Mike Piwowar
- Momohei Yabushita
- Ashton Banwell

== Former team members ==
- Mark Gonzales
- Guy Mariano
- Jason Lee
- Danny Way
- Rudy Johnson
- Jovontae Turner
- Henry Sanchez
- Brian Lotti
- Jeron Wilson
- Keenan Milton
- Kris Markovich
- Lavar McBride
- Gideon Choi
- Josh Kasper
- Jani Laitiala
- Jake Brown
- Danny Cerezini
- Jake Duncombe
- James Craig
- Cody McEntire
- Kevin Romar
- Jordan Maxham
- Ronnie Creager
- Yuri Facchini
- Sewa Kroetkov
- Evan Schiefelbine
- Sean Sheffey
- Yuto Horigome
- Ben Sanchez
- Grant Patterson
- Sam Beckett
- Filipe Ortiz
- Corey Sheppard
- Kyle Black
- Morgan Smith
- TJ Rogers
- Nassim Lachhab
- Steven Vasquez
- Miguel Velez

== Videography ==
- Video Days (1991)
- Tim & Henry's Pack of Lies (1992)
- What If? (2005) (Video Days was included as a separate disc for the special edition release)
- The Blind Video (2009)
- This Is Not A Test (2011)
- Damn... (2013)
- X2 Vision (2014)

== See also ==
- Flip tricks
- Thrasher
- Transworld SKATEboarding
