= Ben Sanchez =

Ben Sanchez may refer to:

- Ben Sanchez (politician) (born 1975), member of the Pennsylvania House of Representatives
- Ben Sanchez (skateboarder)
