= Tony Ferguson (skateboarder) =

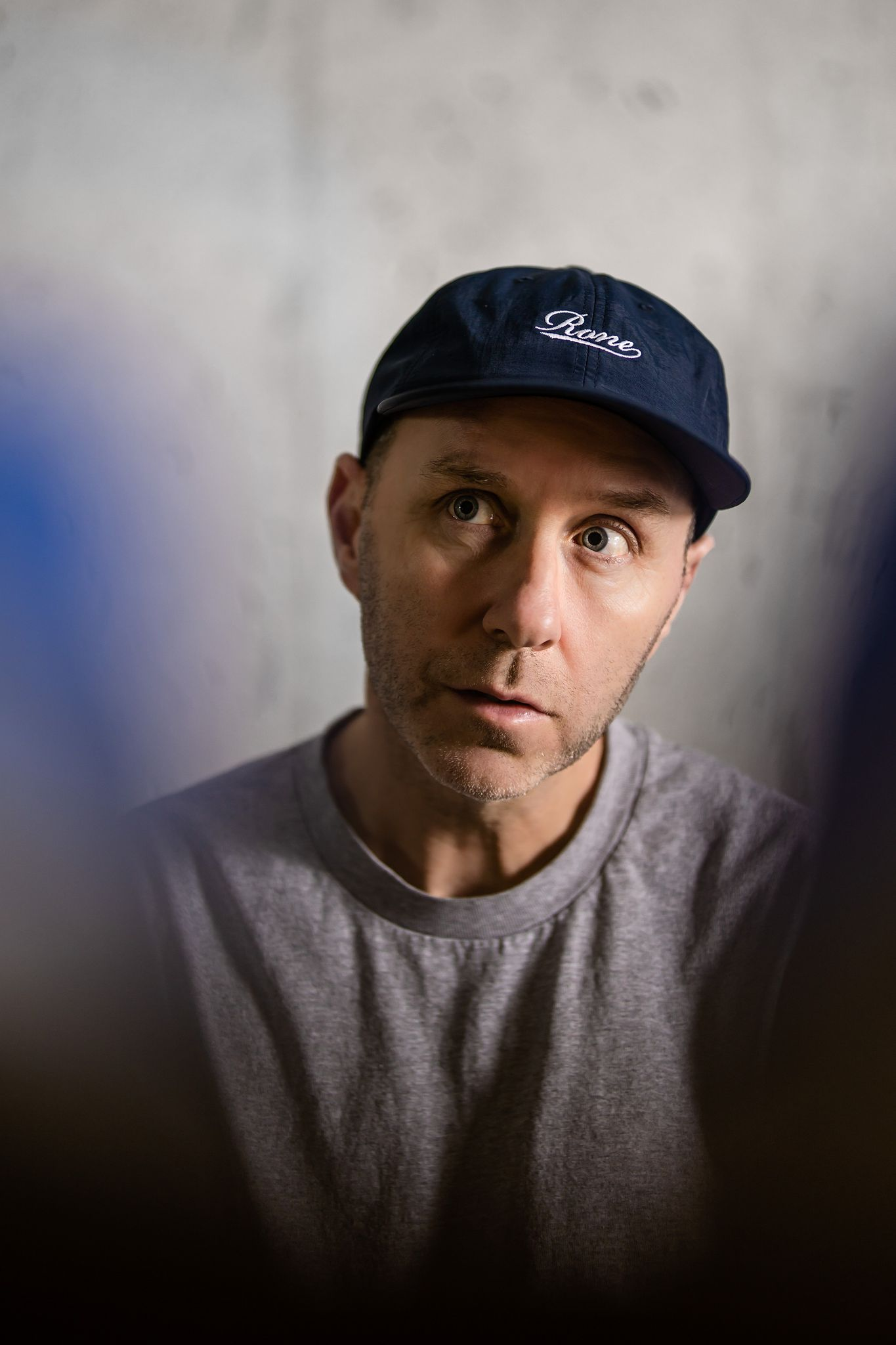

Personal information
- Full name: Tony Ferguson
- Born: May 4, 1973 (age 53) Edmonton, Alberta, Canada
- Home town: Vancouver, British Columbia
- Website: www.tonyfergusonofficial.com

Sport
- Country: Canada
- Sport: Skateboarding

Tony Ferguson (born May 4, 1973) is a professional skateboarder and company owner. He was an original member of the Girl Skateboards team.

== Early life ==
Tony was born in Edmonton, Alberta on May 4, 1973. His early years were spent in Ottawa, Ontario where he began skateboarding at age 12. His family moved to Vancouver, British Columbia in 1990. In 1994, he was living in Los Angeles, California.

== Career ==
Tony Ferguson is a professional skateboarder, tastemaker and footwear designer. Along with a handful of other professional skaters and cinematographer Spike Jonze, Ferguson helped start the highly influential Girl Skateboard company in 1993. Tony retired from professional skateboarding and moved into footwear in 2006, acquiring the global footwear license for New York streetwear pioneers Alife. From there he went on to work on projects with brands like Adidas, Timberland, Reebok and personalities including Drake, Nas and Kanye West.

In 2015 Ferguson founded skate inspired luxury footwear brand Rone, with design, development and production teams in Europe and Asia. The brand has appeared in publications including GQ, Forbes, Esquire, Hypebeast, and has collaborated with brands such as The Ace Hotel and New Balance.

== Videography ==
- Plan B – Virtual Reality (1993)
- Eric Koston Profile 411 VM (1993)
- Girl Skateboards – Goldfish (1994)
- Girl Skateboards – Mouse (1996)
- Chocolate - Chocolate Tour (1999)
- 411 VM – Girl Chocolate (1999)
- Girl Chocolate Euroblitz (2000)
- Girl Skateboards – Yeah Right (2003)
- North Two (2004)
- Four Star North Of Everything (2008)
- North (2009)
- Crail Couch interview (2009)
- Crailtap’s mini DV drawer mouse years (2010)
- Crailtap’s mini DV drawer Yeah right years (2011)
- Maolo’s tapes, 20 years of Girl (2013)
- Vice Epicly Later’d – Koston Part 4 (2014)
- Girl X Alife Budweiser commercial (2014)
- Chocolate city series commercial (2014)
