= Brian Anderson (skateboarder) =

American skateboarder (born 1976)

Personal information
- Born: June 12, 1976 (age 50) Groton, Connecticut, U.S.

Sport
- Sport: Skateboarder

Brian Anderson (born June 12, 1976) is a professional skateboarder based in Queens, New York City.

== Biography ==
=== Early life ===
Anderson is a native of the U.S. state of Connecticut.

=== Professional skateboarding ===
Anderson attained professional status in around August 1998 while riding for Toy Machine and was named Thrasher magazine's "Skater of the Year" the following year after he joined the Girl Skateboards team. The magazine's editor-in-chief explained:

When I first saw him, it was a picture of a frontside bluntslide at Hubba Hideout. This barbaric dude that was obviously larger than life. He just walked right into the spotlight from working 70 hours as a line cook, to being the hottest thing in skateboarding.

On August 23, 2013, Anderson's inaugural Nike SB signature model shoe the "Project BA" was launched in New York City. The event was held at the Ludlow Studios Gallery on the Lower East Side and heavy metal band Unlocking the Truth provided the musical entertainment for the attendees. Nike SB designer Fabricio Costa used sketches that were drawn by Anderson to create a skate shoe with a "runner-like upturned toe" that is designed specifically for flip tricks.

=== Sponsors ===
As of January 1, 2016, Anderson is sponsored by Anti Hero Skateboards, Nike SB, Ace trucks, Labor Skateboard Shop, Spitfire, and Bones.

=== Personal life ===
In September 2016, Anderson came out as gay, saying that it was something that he knew from a young age. Anderson revealed that he was "totally scared" as a young adult, and chose to hide because he thought it would have a negative effect on his career and that it would be dangerous to talk about in the macho skateboarding world. He hopes to encourage others to come out with the message "it gets better."

== Art ==
Anderson is an amateur artist and has contributed graphics for Girl's skateboard products. In 2013, Anderson revealed his intention to initiate his own creative skateboard venture as part of his departure from Girl:

Throughout my career I have valued sharing my creative output with the companies that have supported me, and I knew that one day I would want to direct this energy toward a project of my own. That time has arrived. Although it has been a difficult decision, I'm looking forward to this new endeavor.

== Company owner ==
During a period when established riders left board companies that they had been with for lengthy periods of time—for example, Jason Dill's departure from Alien Workshop and Jerry Hsu's from Enjoi—Anderson amicably resigned from the Girl skateboard company to commence his own skateboard deck brand, entitled "3D Skateboards." In response to a question about the situation at Girl prior to his departure, Anderson explained:

There was absolutely nothing wrong with the way things were going with Girl. That's why it was hard to go through with everything because we’re all really close friends and I love those guys so much. I just felt like I wanted to do something for myself, instead of in a few years realizing that I can't jump down stairs when I'm 45 ...

Following his decision to leave Girl, Anderson revealed in a later interview that he "went to LA to talk to Girl about it and told them I’m getting older and I wanted to do my own thing. And it wasn’t fun for any of us ... I just wanna convey how much I love those guys, there was absolutely nothing wrong and I’m glad they are my friends." Anderson left the Girl team on May 16, 2013 after over a decade with the company. As of September 1, 2013, Anderson remains on the Fourstar clothing brand that is distributed by Girl.

Initially, Anderson recruited Alex Olson, who left Girl shortly after Anderson, and Austyn Gillette, who left Habitat to join the company of his close friend that "would be fun at this point in life." However, Olson departed shortly afterwards to start his own board company, as 3D "just kinda looked like Girl," and Anderson and Olson "had two different visions."

Anderson partnered with fellow former Toy Machine pro and skateboard company owner Brad Staba of the SkateMental brand, with 3D's distribution also administrated by SkateMental's proprietor, Big Time Distribution. A rumor that implicated Nike, Inc. in the development of the company was refuted by Anderson in an August 2013 interview, "Nike doesn’t do hardgoods. It’s a huge corporation, that’s not where they’re at or I’m at, they are just my awesome shoe sponsor. We are doing this on our own, with our own funds and on our own terms ... they [Nike] got my back."

The first catalog for 3D was released in September 2013.

3D ceased operations in 2015 due to difficulties resulting from Anderson's residence in New York City while Big Time Distribution was headquartered in the San Francisco Bay Area. In October 2016, it was announced that he had joined Anti Hero Skateboards

== Contest history ==
Anderson won the World Cup of Skateboarding title in Dortmund, Germany, in 1999.

== Awards ==
Anderson was Thrasher Magazine's "Skater of the Year" in 1999. He was inducted into the Skateboarding Hall of Fame in 2026.

== See also ==
- LGBT culture in New York City
- List of LGBT people from New York City
- NYC Pride March
