= Fully Flared =

- Directed by: Ty Evans; Spike Jonze; Cory Weincheque
- Starring: Mike Mo Capaldi; Anthony Pappalardo; Jesus Fernandez; Nick Jensen; Danny Brady; Lucas Puig; JJ Rousseau; JB Gillet; Cairo Foster; Alex Olson; Rick Howard; Mike Carroll; Brandon Biebel; Eric Koston; Guy Mariano; Marc Johnson
- Edited by: Ty Evans
- Music by: Sam Spiegel (original)
- Distributed by: Lakai
- Release date: November 16, 2007
- Running time: 90 mins.
- Country: United States
- Language: English

Fully Flared is a street skateboarding video by the Lakai footwear company, featuring video parts from its team riders. The film is directed by Ty Evans, Spike Jonze, and Cory Weincheque. In 2007, it won "Best Video of the Year" at the Transworld Skateboarding Awards, while Guy Mariano won both the "Best Street" and "Best Video Part" awards at the same event. It was one of the first skateboarding videos to use high-definition cameras. The film has become a skateboarding culture icon as the apex of professional skateboarding.

== Introduction feature ==
The introduction features the skateboarders performing tricks in a vacant urban space, consisting of obstacles, blocks, and stair sets, while explosions occur. Presented in slow motion, the introduction feature is accompanied by a soundtrack from electronic music group, M83.

Originally, Evans, Jonze, and Howard played with different ideas that were significantly more dangerous than what was eventually featured. The introduction was eventually filmed three weeks prior to the premiere.

== Production ==
Overall the film took about four years to make.

Some team members have a considerable amount of leftover footage, and plan to use it for other videos. Most of the video was filmed with Sony DCR-VX1000 cameras. The Panasonic HVX200 (to which Ty Evans gained access, towards the end of filming) high-definition camera was used for second angles.

== Filming ==
The main group filming was Aaron Meza and Chris Ray. In Europe, an Italian filmer named Federico Vitetta - who had been living with Oliver Barton in Spain for a year - took on the role. Then was conceptual help from Rick Howard and Spike Jonze. Finally, Johannes Gamble helped with all the effects work.

== Release ==
The video's release was postponed for about two years, mainly due to important team additions.
