= Lakai Limited Footwear =

Skateboard shoe company

- Industry: Skateboarding
- Founded: Torrance, California, in 1999
- Headquarters: Torrance, California
- Key people: Rick Howard; Mike Carroll
- Website: www.lakai.com

Lakai Limited Footwear is an American footwear company based in Torrance, California, that creates shoes designed for and inspired by skateboarding. Lakai was founded in 1999 by the professional skateboarders Mike Carroll and Rick Howard, who co-founded Girl Skateboards.

== History ==
=== Beginnings ===
Both Carroll and Howard decided that they wanted to make a contribution to the skate footwear industry by founding their own company rather than being sponsored. One night in April 1999, while at Largo Comedy Club in Los Angeles, Tim Gavin proposed an idea to Howard about starting a new shoe company. Afterwards, Howard and Carroll decided to partner with Podium Distribution to launch Lakai Limited Footwear.

In August 1999, Carroll contacted Cairo Foster and asked him if he would like to ride for his “unnamed” shoe company. When Foster called his current sponsor to quit, he said, "Mike Carroll asked me to ride for his shoe company, that’s all I know." After hanging up the phone, he informally became Lakai's first official team rider.

In the next couple of months, Andy Jenkins hired designer Andy Mueller to develop a logo for Lakai, which later became known as the “Flare”. Mueller moved to Los Angeles shortly thereafter to become Lakai's art director. Kelly Bird was hired as Lakai's team manager.

Anthony Pappalardo, Rob Welsh, and Jeff Lenoce agreed to become Lakai's first batch of amateur talent, earning $250 per month; in November 1999, Scott Johnston left his sponsor, DC Shoes, and joined Lakai as the final rider on the company's introductory team. By May 2000, the first line of Lakai shoes ("Howard", "Carroll", "Cohort", "Clay", and "Worthy") were delivered to shops worldwide.

=== Developments ===
In June 2000, after filming together for Transworld's Modus Operandi, Carroll asked Brandon Biebel to join Lakai. In April 2001, Scott Johnston's debut pro model was released, and Danny Garcia joined the team. In November 2001, JJ Rousseau became Lakai's first official European rider. In March 2002, after waiting for almost a year for his existing shoe contract to expire, Lakai welcomed Marc Johnson to the team; his first pro model came out a little over one year later. Cairo Foster's first pro model came out in December 2003. In January 2004, Lucas Puig and JB Gillet joined the team, and with Rousseau officially formed the subgroup called "The French Connection".

In May 2004, the first ever co-brand shoe with Girl Skateboards was released, paving the way for several more notable collaborations, including the series "The Art Dump", "Dominion", "Wrench Pilot", "The Quiet Life", and "Where the Wild Things Are". In May 2005, Guy Mariano joined Lakai after a long hiatus from skateboarding. Jesus Fernandez also joined the team, as well as Brits, Nick Jensen, and Danny Brady, who were dubbed "The Royal Family". In September 2005, Alex Olson, the son of veteran pro skateboarder Steve Olson, became Lakai's first amateur in almost five years. After months of speculation, Eric Koston joined Lakai in May 2006.

In July 2006, Danny Garcia was the first skateboarder to leave Lakai, and moved onto his next shoes sponsor, éS Footwear. Mike Mo was officially announced as a team amateur (AM) in August 2006, and Guy Mariano received his first pro model shoe. Eric Koston's pro models released in December 2006. In January 2007, Scott Johnston joined the Lakai design team, beginning his transition from professional skater to footwear designer. Johnston told ESPN: "... that was my plan, to end on a good note and not bleed this career dry the way some guys do by not letting it go. Skating was so good to me, and I want to be good to it and not be one of those guys that won't go away. I still skate, I don't need to get paid for it, though." In May 2007, Brandon Biebel's first signature shoe was released; in August, Independent Trucks partnered with Lakai to release their first footwear collaboration ever, the "Koston Select / Independent Limited Edition". In November 2007, Lakai released its first full-length video, Fully Flared.

=== After Fully Flared ===
In March 2008, Alex Olson and Anthony Pappalardo decided to part ways with Lakai in pursuit of footwear opportunities with Vans and Converse CONS. The following month, Vincent Alvarez became Lakai's newest AM.

In 2009, Lakai celebrated their 10-year anniversary with a special catalog showcasing the history of the brand.

Eric Koston was next to leave Lakai, in pursuit of sponsorship with NIKE SB. A skit in the same vein as his Lakai introduction was made as a send-off for Koston. In 2010, Lakai introduced Riley Hawk, Daniel Espinoza, and Raven Tershy as their newest AMs, along with their video introduction, Am I Am. In 2011, Lucas Puig left Lakai for Adidas. Sebo Walker was announced as Lakai's newest AM with his clip in the "Carroll 5: Out of Control" commercial. Lakai left Podium Distribution to join Girl Skateboards Distribution. Lakai won Thrasher's King of the Road competition with 6,060 points. This also marked Mike Mo Capaldi's last Lakai trip; he went on to join DC Shoes in December 2011.

=== The Flare Era ===
After adding names such as Stevie Perez, Jon Sciano, Ronnie Sandoval, and Miles Silvas, a meeting was held at Spike Jonze's house in early 2014. Discussion was made for Lakai's next full-length video, which would eventually be titled The Flare. Throughout the filming for the video, the team went through massive changes as riders left the company, including Miles Silvas, Ronnie Sandoval, Brandon Biebel, and most notably, Guy Mariano and Marc Johnson. Lakai brand manager Kelly Bird and shoe designer Scott Johnston left the company in 2015. Amateur riders such as Cody Chapman, Simon Bannerot, Tyler "Manchild" Pacheco, Yonnie Cruz, James Capps, Nico Hiraga, and Johnny Jones joined the company, as well as veteran pro Rick McCrank. The Flare released in July 2017, unveiling Lakai's next additions to the team: Jimmy Wilkins and Tony Hawk.

Griffin Gass was later announced as a member of the team in February 2018.

=== Acquisitions ===
In 2014, Lakai left Girl Distribution and joined HUF under Renegade Brands, an Altamont Capital portfolio company. In 2017, Lakai was sold to TSI Holdings as part of the HUF Worldwide sale. In October 2024 Lakai was acquired by Inversal. Shortly after Inversal's acquisition, founders Mike Carroll and Rick Howard, along with the Lakai skate team, were released from the brand.

== Videos ==
Similar to the other brands distributed by Girl, Lakai has received a considerable level of attention for its video productions. Videographer and director Ty Evans has been responsible for the majority of Lakai's video productions, followed by Federico Vitetta.

=== Australia Tour (2001) ===
Lakai's first release was a short video of a tour through Australia and New Zealand, featuring original riders Brandon Biebel, Rick Howard, Jeff Lenoce, Anthony Pappalardo, Scott Johnston, and Rob Welsh. The tour also included lensman Ty Evans, team manager Kelly Bird, art director Andy Mueller, and photographer Mike O' Meally. Missing on the tour were Mike Carroll and Cairo Foster.

The tour's video showcased the personality and skill of rising stars Brandon Biebel and Anthony Pappalardo. It was released on VHS for skateshops only, and came with a zine featuring photos and interviews taken on the trip by Mueller and O' Meally. The video was later remastered and included as a bonus feature on The Final Flare DVD boxset.

=== Beware of the Flare (2002) ===
Lakai's second release was a much bigger production: a 30-minute tour video through Europe. It introduced Marc Johnson to the team, as well as offered a sneak peek of flow riders JJ Rousseau and Lucas Puig, who were later dubbed "The French Connection" in Fully Flared. Although not all riders were present on the trip (such as Cairo Foster and Danny Garcia), those who were absent were included in a team montage at the end of the video.

The focus of the video was to document tour life, showcasing a behind-the-scenes look at travelling, injuries, packed signings, and a huge number of demos. The video includes commentary about each of these topics, as well as demo and street montages. The video was shot by Ty Evans and Dan Wolfe, with photography by Atiba Jefferson, and was released on VHS in June 2002.

=== Fully Flared (2007) ===
Lakai's first full-length video, Fully Flared, premiered November 16, 2007. The video had an enormous amount of hype surrounding it, mostly due to high-profile riders such as Eric Koston being added to the team, a rumored 13-minute Marc Johnson part, the return of Guy Mariano, and a release date that was pushed back multiple times throughout 2005–2007.

==== Timeline ====
Filming for the video started almost immediately after Chocolate Skateboards' video Hot Chocolate. The first filming trip was to Arizona in November 2003.

In the Fully Flared book that came with The Final Flare (2008) boxset, Marc Johnson explains the beginning stages of the video:

It was kind of just known that we were all going to start this project. I don't remember a specific phone call. I didn't have any initial thoughts about the video. I didn't have any idea that it would turn out to be what it actually ended up being. Back then, in my mind, it was just 'we are working on a video.' It was a lot more laid back. I'd just go skate with the bros and if you got a clip, you got a clip. The beginning was a lot more mellow...

— Marc Johnson

In February 2004 a handful of the team embarked on a trip to Barcelona and Mallorca. The goal was to have the video done by the end of 2005. During the trip, it snowed, which the locals explain "never happens". The team met up with European riders JJ Rousseau, JB Gillet, and Lucas Puig.

The Barcelona / Mallorca trip was the first official 'oh this is really happening.' It was fucking freezing cold and it snowed. It was sick to have the whole crew there skating around. This was the first 'lets get up early in the morning, get down to Starbucks, blah, blah, blah.' You are just going and going and not stopping.

— Mike Carroll

In March 2005, with the original video deadline approaching, a rough cut of the video was made. While Marc Johnson already had 15 minutes of edited footage, others had as little as 30 seconds. Marc felt embarrassed to have a disproportionately large screentime. It was evident that the team had a lot of work to do if they wanted to meet the deadline set for the end of the year.

A couple of months later, Lakai added Guy Mariano to the team after a 5-year hiatus from skateboarding. Initially, Guy thought he was just going to film a handful of tricks for the video as sort of a welcome back, but Ty pushed for Guy to have a full part. Because of this, and the fact the rough cut didn't meet expectations, the video was delayed to a 2006 release.

By the summer of 2006, the Lakai team had grown to an astonishing size of 20 riders, the latest being Eric Koston. With the deadline quickly approaching, another rough edit was made at the end of summer. The team still was not happy with the edit, especially considering all the outside hype and pressure from the industry and fans. Yet again, the video deadline was pushed to the end of 2007.

Well into the fourth year of production (and two years past the initial deadline), an exhausted video budget meant the only viable option was to close it out with two vans, the open road, and cheap hotels. Riders quickly became accustomed to the "Motel 6 tour life"—finding things like used condoms and cockroaches in their hotel room, living off gas station food, spending hours on the road, peeing in bottles, fixing spots, and staying up all day and night filming for the video.

I just felt really bad when all the POP got out. Distribution bought all these cardboard stand ups, and these posters, and all this stuff. They were trying to pre-order it. We were running 'out now' ads. There were window displays. When I realized it wasn't going to the cutting room floor anytime soon. It was hard. Then I had to go back and say, 'we got to put another year's worth of our marketing budget into this.' At the end of the third year, it was obvious what was happening with video sales. We were coming up with marketing schemes to help sell the video because we were convinced we were not going to sell any copies of this thing. We have almost a million dollars invested into this thing. It was hard math to justify. I was afraid it was going to saddle the company forever.

— Kelly Bird

Towards the end of production, a timer appeared on the website, counting down the release of the video, to the second. Alex Olson stated that he thought it was "the worst fucking thing they could do to us. It's like knowing the day you're going to die or something".

==== Ads, names, release dates ====
In December 2004, Lakai's 60th ad was the first to mention a video in production. In the ad, text coming out of Ty's camera read, "Another new video..... it just seems weird." This is a tribute to Carroll's infamous response when initially asked about the idea.

The next ad with any reference to the video came about a year later, in September 2005. In the ad, the text read, "Another new video... get ready for the Heat Score suckas", thus sparking a long trial-and-error process of naming the video.

In November 2005, ad #71 is released, with Scott Johnston's suggestion of naming it "The Full Flare". This came close to the final name, but it took another five months to evolve into the name that eventually stuck.

I think we were on a tour kicking around names. Carroll was still trying to push "Lakai or Die", but no one was feeling that because of the Zero or Die video. Someone brought up the Beware of the Flare tour video, and I said, 'We blew it. That should have been the name of the official video. We used it on just a tour video.' Then I was like 'full length video. Full Flare. The Full Flare.' They were like all 'that's not too bad. That's a possibility.

— Scott Johnston

In February 2006, ad #76, the name "Who Flares?" was thrown out. Ty was not happy about this and the working title "The Full Flare" returned. The next month's ad was the first ad to use the triangular color prism that became emblematic for all Fully Flared branding. In April 2006, ad #81 was the first time the actual name of the video was seen. The name "Fully Flared", a morph of "The Full Flare" title Scott Johnston had suggested, was coined by Kelly Bird.

The first trailer was also released, set to the song "Leave Them All Behind" by Whitey. This song became somewhat of a theme song for Fully Flared and was used for the main menu music on the DVD. In the summer of 2006, ads were released in magazines such as Thrasher Magazine and Transworld Skateboarding stating that the video was coming in 2006, the first of many premature release dates.

In spring 2007, convinced that the video would be finished, Lakai dedicated their entire spring catalog to the video. The inside had a mock editing timeline running across the bottom of every page. The first Fully Flared limited edition shoe was also in this catalog. Finally, in November 2007, the release date of November 16th was set and made public in ad #102. Ads #103–105 also promoted the release of the video.

==== Introduction of High Definition (HD) ====
In 2006, Panasonic released the HVX-200, a high definition (HD) camcorder with P2 technology. Quickly adopted by Ty Evans, the HD camera was met with mixed emotions. No one completely understood the concept of how its footage would be used in the video. The HD footage was later cropped to a 4:3 aspect ratio to match the standard definition footage. Most of the HD footage was used for b-roll shots such as riders dropping their boards, fixing spots, getting kicked out, or portraits. Some shots also served as alternate angles of tricks. All of the HD footage would later be compiled on the Blu-Ray disc of The Final Flare (2008), shown in its proper format.

At first Ty would use it for filming like a little filler clip, personality clip. So when it came out to actually film a serious trick, you almost felt like 'shit, I'm trying this hard ass trick and it's a little filler clip?' Which clearly it wasn't, but you know at first we were thinking 'if it's getting serious, screw that death lens on there and get in there close.' It was just that old mentality of the good old days of how we filmed videos. We didn't take these HD cameras too seriously in the beginning. Obviously seeing it in the end, it is the way things are going to go. It's a much better product.

— Eric Koston

==== Release and reception ====
Fully Flared premiered at UCLA's Royce Hall on Friday, November 16, 2007, at 8:00pm. Along with the world premiere came an international tour of premieres, in Vancouver on the 17th, London on the 18th, Lyon on the 20th, and Tokyo on the 24th. The video received great feedback and won awards, including Best Video Award at the 10th Transworld Skateboarding Awards. Marc Johnson went on to win Thrasher's Skater of the Year. Guy Mariano won TWS Best Street Skater, Best Video Part, and the Readers' Choice Award. In Thrasher Magazine's 2007 T-Eddy Awards, Fully Flared was Video of the Year; Guy Mariano was awarded Best Comeback, Ever; and Mike Mo Capaldi was awarded AM of the Year.

=== The Flare (2017) ===
The Flare, Lakai's second full-length video was released in July 2017, ten years after their first video, Fully Flared. Filming officially began in February 2014 after a meeting at Spike's house in Los Angeles. Throughout the video, there was massive changes to the team, both on the inside, and outside. This video would heavily feature the newer squad of rising stars, with appearances from team veterans. At the time of release, the only riders left from Fully Flared were Rick Howard, Mike Carroll, Danny Brady, and Jesus Fernandez. Since Ty Evans left Girl Films in 2013 following Girl & Chocolate Skateboards' video Pretty Sweet, Federico Vitetta led the videography and was joined by Daniel Wheatley, Rye Beres, and John Marello.

The Flare premiered on June 13, 2017, at the Egyptian Theatre in Hollywood. At the premiere, the podcast The Nine Club with Chris Roberts interviewed riders and people associated with the brand.

== Team riders ==
The Lakai team consists of the following riders:

=== Professional ===
- Chris Joslin
- Bastien Salabanzi
- Roman Hager
- Gabryel Aguylar

=== Amateur ===
- Evon Martinez
- Coco Yoshizawa
- Jumpei Tsutsumi

=== Former ===
- Danny Garcia
- Scott Johnston
- JJ Rousseau
- Alex Olson
- Anthony Pappalardo
- Lucas Puig
- Eric Koston
- Mike Mo Capaldi
- Rob Welsh
- Cairo Foster
- Jeff Lenoce
- Karsten Kleppan
- Guy Mariano
- Brandon Biebel
- Marc Johnson (deceased)
- JB Gillet
- Daniel Espinoza
- Raven Tershy
- Nick Jensen
- Ronnie Sandoval
- Jon Sciano
- Sebo Walker
- Danny Brady
- Jesus Fernandez
- Rick McCrank
- Tony Hawk
- Mike Carroll
- Rick Howard
- Vincent Alvarez
- Stevie Perez
- Simon Bannerot
- Tyler "Manchild" Pacheco
- Griffin Gass
- James Capps
- Jimmy Wilkins
- Cody Chapman
- Nico Hiraga
- Greg Dehart
- Kyonosuke Yamashita

== Videography ==
- Australia/NZ Tour (2001)
- Beware Of The Flare (2002)
- Canada Eh? (2004)
- The Red Flare Tour (2006)
- EMB Carroll (2007)
- Fully Flared (2007)
- The Final Flare! (2008)
- Fully Trippin' in Malaga (2008)
- Voltage (2010)
- Am I Am (2010)
- 2010 Video Collection (2010)
- Transworld's Skate & Create "LAKAIromania" (2010)
- Getting Nordical Tour (2010)
- Stupor Tour (2014)
- Stay Flared (2015) (with Emerica Footwear)
- The Flare (2017)
- La Flareto Rico Tour (2019)
- No Rest in the Northwest Tour (2019)
- Flare Canada Tour (2019)
- Street Safari Tour (2019)
- Bubble (2023)
