= Girl Distribution Company =

American skateboarding distribution company

Crailtap is a skateboarding distribution company based in Torrance, California, United States. The distribution company is home to Girl Skateboards, Chocolate Skateboards, Royal Skateboard Trucks, and Fourstar Clothing.

== Girl Skateboards ==
=== History ===
Girl Skateboards, the inaugural brand of the company, originated in 1993 after a selection World Industries riders Mike Carroll and Rick Howard, along with Spike Jonze and Megan Baltimore, decided to found their own brand.

Howard explained in a 2000 interview:

Part of the reason we started Girl was so pro skateboarders would have a future. Take Royal, for instance. When Guy Mariano and Rudy Johnson's legs don't work anymore, at least what they've done for skateboarding and their ideas can continue with something they can fall back on. All the Girl Distribution companies are based around people who have helped Girl get to where it is today.

Howard and Carroll revealed in 2013 as part of the company's 20-year anniversary commemoration that the majority of the skateboard industry at the time was acrimonious towards the new enterprise. Carroll stated that a particular woodshop was threatened by another company and consequently severed ties with Girl, but that industry figure, Fausto Vitello, assisted Girl in numerous ways. Carroll explained that Vitello "...he always just, kinda, let us know that he had our back."

In addition to Howard and Carroll, the original Girl team consisted of Jovontae Turner, Eric Koston, Guy Mariano, Rudy Johnson, Tim Gavin, Tony Ferguson, Sean Sheffey, and Jeron Wilson. The company has evolved into a distribution company that distributes skateboard hard goods, skateboard videos and films, and soft goods. The Girl logo is similar to the symbol on women's bathrooms and was designed by Girl's in-house artist Andy Jenkins, who left the company to join Element Skateboards in October 2017. Named the "Art Dump," the design department of Girl was overseen by Jenkins and included contributions from artists such as Geoff McFetridge, Kevin Lyons, and Hershel Baltrotsky.

In the period leading up to the year 2000, Carroll and Howard were filming for the TransWorld SKATEboarding video Modus Operandi and their filmer, Ty Evans, invited a young unknown skateboarder named Brandon Biebel to accompany them on filming/skateboarding sessions. Biebel had moved from Chicago to California, US and had met Evans previously in Southern California. At the 2000 premiere of the video, Carroll asked Biebel to join the Lakai skate shoe team, followed by an offer to join Girl several months afterwards. Biebel was assigned professional status in 2002 and stated in a 2012 interview: "Girl, Lakai — that's a dream come true. I ain't never leaving that shit."

During the mid-2000s, Girl recruited new amateur riders Mike Mo Capaldi, Sean Malto, and Alex Olson, and established amateur Jereme Rogers was assigned professional status with the company in 2005. Rogers left the company in 2007 due to his dissatisfaction with his royalty payments, while Capaldi, Malto, and Olson were assigned professional status the following year.

Rogers later explained his issues with Girl in an October 2012 interview:

I was getting my cheque, just not my actual royalties. I got a three thousand dollar guarantee a month, which operated as a minimum; meaning I get that no matter what, but if I sell over the minimum, I get the extras - royalties kick in ... So what had happened was, they were letting my royalties fall back into the company to cover their overhead, which helped keep a boat afloat that had some leaks. For two years I apparently didn't break my three thousand dollar minimum ... Don't forget, we're talking about Girl here who sells all around the world ... So I inappropriately blurted out at Tampa 2007, after getting second to Koston, who had a flawed run, against mine which was flawless, that all I wanted was my royalties, when Rick Howard asked what I wanted after doing so well. The following month I got a six thousand dollar cheque ... The first time I broke my three thousand dollar minimum, "apparently", and on top of that, it was April; tax time. Coincidence ... Sure.

A statement from Girl was not released in response to Rogers's claims.

After winning the "Bang Yo' Self 2" contest, held by the Berrics website, in April 2009, Cory Kennedy was recruited by Girl and was assigned professional status in mid-2011. In regard to Kennedy's victory, the Berrics wrote: "Today, April 2nd, 2009, is the beginning of Cory Kennedy's tyranny over skateboarding. May God have mercy on our souls." Kennedy was unaware of his promotion, as he was deliberately informed by the company that a filming session was occurring at the North Hollywood skatepark; however, 20 of Kennedy's inaugural signature skateboard deck were given to random people at the park who skated on the decks, together with Girl team members who were also using the deck, while Kennedy remained unaware. After 20 minutes, Kennedy eventually realized that his name was written on the decks.

In May 2013, longtime Girl team riders Brian Anderson and Olson announced that they had parted ways with the company as a board sponsor. Anderson explained that he would be pursuing a creative venture of his own, while Olson did not disclose a subsequent sponsor and stated: "I wouldn't be where I am today without the help and motivation of Girl." Following the announcement of Anderson's own skateboard deck company "3D Skateboards" and the recruitment of Olson (who left to form his own brand shortly afterwards), the former Girl team member affirmed that his departure was not due to dissatisfaction:

There was absolutely nothing wrong with the way things were going with Girl. That's why it was hard to go through with everything because we're all really close friends and I love those guys so much. I just felt like I wanted to do something for myself, instead of in a few years realizing that I can't jump down stairs when I'm 45, and I kinda wanted to have my own thing started by the time that happens. I have a few Girl tattoos, and I'm happy I have them because it's great memories of fun trips and great years.

When asked to comment on the departure of team members in August 2013, Carroll stated, "When people quit for other companies for just more money, or something, that's stupid. But, if someone quits because they don't feel right on a team, or something, then, and for another company, that makes sense."

As of August 2013, the Girl brand has existed for 20 years and Howard explained his perspective on the longevity of Girl in an interview with Route One magazine:

We've grown up together doing this, so, yeah, we're just lucky to work with our friends, you know? And all share the same things in what we do here, so ... That's how we started and that's what we do to this day. This is up for everyone to have fun with, you know?

In 2015 Girl announced the departure of Koston and Mariano.

Through 2016 to 2018 Girl added four new amateurs to the team; Simon Bannerot, Tyler "Manchild" Pacheco, Griffin Gass, and Niels Bennett. They also welcomed Andrew Brophy to the team following the end of Cliché Skateboards. Girl released their first full-length video since Pretty Sweet in October 2018, titled, "Doll", which formally introduces Griffin and Niels to the team.

In 2019, Girl added the first ever girl to the team, Breana Geering, from Vancouver, Canada.

In 2020, Girl releases "Nervous Circus" and turn Griffin Gass and Niels Bennett pro.

=== Team Riders ===
Professional

- Mike Carroll
- Rick Howard
- Jeron Wilson
- Rick McCrank
- Sean Malto
- Cory Kennedy
- Tyler Pacheco
- Simon Bannerot
- Andrew Brophy
- Griffin Gass
- Niels Bennett
- Breana Geering
- Rowan Davis
- Deandre Thebpanya "Lil Dre"

Amateur

- Isaac Relis
- Matteo Vandeputte

Former

- Jovantae Turner
- Tim Gavin
- Sean Sheffey
- Rudy Johnson
- Colin McKay
- Paul Rodriguez
- Jereme Rogers
- Alex Olson
- Brian Anderson
- Guy Mariano
- Eric Koston
- Robbie McKinley
- Tony Ferguson
- Brandon Biebel
- Mike Mo Capaldi

=== Videography ===
- 1994: Goldfish
- 1996: Mouse
- 1999: Girl in South Africa
- 2000: Euro Blitz
- 2003: Harsh Euro Barge
- 2003: Yeah Right!
- 2004: High Fives Up The i-5
- 2005: Oi! Meets Girl!
- 2005: What Tour?
- 2006: Yes We CANada
- 2007: Badass Meets Dumbass (with Chocolate skateboards)
- 2007: We're OK EurOK (with Chocolate Skateboards)
- 2008: Beauty and the Beast (with Anti-Hero Skateboards)
- 2008: Yanks On Planks
- 2009: Beauty and the Beast 2 (with Anti-Hero Skateboards)
- 2010: Beauty and the Beast 3 (with Anti-Hero Skateboards)
- 2010: Der Bratwurst Tour Ever (with Chocolate skateboards)
- 2010: Outbackwards
- 2011: Unbeleafable (3D film)
- 2012: Pretty Sweet (with Chocolate skateboards)
- 2013: Pretty Sweet US Tour (with Chocolate Skateboards)
- 2014: Wet Dream: A Skateboard Tale
- 2015: Going Dumb Up The 101 (with Chocolate Skateboards)
- 2016: Girl & Chocolate in Mexico (with Chocolate Skateboards)
- 2016: Girl Skates Washington State
- 2017: When Nature Calls
- 2018: Chickity China (with Chocolate Skateboards)
- 2018: Don't Mess With Girl
- 2018: Out For A Rip
- 2018: Doll
- 2019: Bangers & Mash
- 2019: Melbourne Identity
- 2020: Nervous Circus
- 2020: Pretty Stoned (with Volcom)
- 2021: In Real Life
- 2022: Desesh Mode
- 2023: OntourOZ
- 2024: GRL-NYC-GMV
- 2025: Neverywhere

== Chocolate Skateboards ==
Chocolate Skateboards logo

=== History ===
In the year following the formation of Girl, the Chocolate brand was introduced, as the growth of Girl inspired the creation of another brand, with the recruitment of additional riders and personnel. Howard and Carroll explained in 2013 that they were compelled to start the brand after an experience in which they were forced to leave behind professional skateboarder Chico Brenes, a close friend at the time, as they embarked on a skateboard tour, as he was unable to fit into the tour van.

The original team consisted of Brenes, Daniel Castillo, Paulo Diaz, Richard Mulder, Shamil Randle, Gabriel Rodriguez, and Ben Sanchez. In 2009, a 15-year anniversary advertisement was published in which a portrait of the team was depicted — the two riders who were not present at the photo shoot, Anthony Pappalardo and Jesus Fernandez, were represented by framed portrait photographs. The Chocolate team made guest appearances in Girl videos, such as Goldfish and Yeah Right!, in addition to producing its own videos, Las Nueve Vidas De Paco (1995), The Chocolate Tour (1999), Se Habla Canuck (2004), and Hot Chocolate (2004), and A Little Chunk of Chocolate (2006).

On November 12, 2013, a video was published on the Crailtap YouTube channel, the official channel of the Girl Distribution Company, in which Jerry Hsu is officially revealed as the new professional for the Chocolate skateboard company. The video skit features Carroll, Marc Johnson, Stevie Perez, Chris Roberts, Elijah Berle, and Gino Ianucci. In the video, the skateboarders (minus Ianucci, who arrives at the end of the skit) discuss a new professional team member for the Chocolate brand in a Mexican restaurant. A list of criteria is articulated by the group's members—a list that is associated with Hsu's career thus far — and Hsu then appears as the waiter. Hsu and fellow Chocolate rider, Elijah Berle, left the company in 2017.

The Chocolate brand celebrated its 20th anniversary in August 2014 with an art show, held at the Art Share Gallery in Los Angeles, U.S. The Berrics website conducted interviews with artist Evan Hecox and Brenes at the event.

Following the release of Lakai Limited Footwear's "The Flare" video, Chocolate turned Yonnie Cruz pro in the summer of 2017. In 2019, Chocolate released the "T.O.N.Y. Tour" video, introducing amateurs Hakeem Ducksworth, James Capps, and Carl Aikens to the team.

In 2021, Chocolate turned James Capps and Carlisle Aikens pro, added Jordan Trahan to the team, and released their first full-length video since Pretty Sweet (2012), titled "Bunny Hop".

=== Team Riders ===
Professional

- Chris Roberts (skateboarder)
- Kenny Anderson
- Jesus Fernandez
- Vincent Alvarez
- Stevie Perez
- Raven Tershy
- James Capps
- Jordan Trahan
- Carlisle Aikens
- Erik Herrera
- Daewon Song

Amateur

- Dougie George
- Leo Bodelazzi

Former

- Keenan Milton
- Daniel Castillo
- Paulo Diaz
- Richard Mulder
- Shamil Randle
- Gabriel Rodriguez
- Ben Sanchez
- Ricardo Carvalho
- Mike York
- Stevie Williams
- Scott Johnston
- Devine Calloway
- Anthony Pappalardo
- Gino Iannucci
- Marc Johnson (deceased)
- Elijah Berle
- Jerry Hsu
- Hakeem Ducksworth
- Yonnie Cruz
- Justin Eldridge

=== Videography ===
- 1995: Las Nueve Vidas De Paco
- 1999: The Chocolate Tour
- 2004: Se Habla Canuck
- 2004: Hot Chocolate
- 2006: A Little Chunk of Chocolate
- 2006: Hittin' Britain & Oui Will Rock You
- 2007: Badass Meets Dumbass (with Girl Skateboards)
- 2007: We're OK EurOK (with Girl Skateboards)
- 2008: Felicità (trailer with Italian artist Bugo)
- 2010: Der Bratwurst Tour Ever
- 2012: Pretty Sweet
- 2013: Pretty Sweet US Tour (with Girl Skateboards)
- 2013: Trunk Boyz In Puerto Rico
- 2015: Going Dumb Up The 101 (with Girl Skateboards)
- 2016: Chocolate Skateboards in Miami
- 2016: Girl & Chocolate in Mexico (with Girl Skateboards)
- 2018: Chickity China (with Girl Skateboards)
- 2019: T.O.N.Y. Tour
- 2021: Bunny Hop
- 2022: Upper Cruster

== Fourstar Clothing ==
Founded by Eric Koston and Guy Mariano in April 1996, as the pair sought to move beyond cargo pants and T-shirts to create affordable clothing for skateboarders. Fourstar Clothing have not released a new collection since Holiday 2016.

=== Past Team Riders ===
- Eric Koston
- Guy Mariano
- Ishod Wair
- Tony Trujillo
- Rick Howard
- Mike Carroll
- Brian Anderson
- Keenan Milton
- Shane O' Neill
- Tyler Bledsoe
- Andrew Brophy
- Sean Malto
- Lucas Puig
- Frank Gerwer
- Max Schaaf
- Mark Gonzales
- Cory Kennedy
- Paul Rodriguez
- PJ Ladd
- Andrew Reynolds
- Colin McKay

=== Videography ===
- Fourstar Clothing Tradeshow Promo (1999)
- Super Champion Funzone (2005)
- Spring/Summer 2005 Catalog Shoot (2005)
- Fall/Winter 2005 Catalog Shoot (2005)
- North of Everything (2008)
- A Tribe Called Mapquest (2008)
- Gang of Fourstar (2009)
- Leisure Till You Seizure (2011)
- Hawaii Four-0 (2012)
- 4 Live Crew (2012)
- Crocodile Done Deal (2014)
- Obtuse Moments (2015)

== Lakai Limited Footwear ==
Lakai Limited Footwear is a skateboard footwear company based in Torrance, California, US, that was founded by Carroll and Howard in 1999.

=== Team Riders ===
Former

- Mike Carroll
- Rick Howard
- Vincent Alvarez
- Riley Hawk
- Stevie Perez
- Simon Bannerot
- Tyler "Manchild" Pacheco
- Griffin Gass
- Cody Chapman
- James Capps
- Jimmy Wilkins
- Nico Hiraga
- Greg DeHart
- Danny Garcia
- Scott Johnston
- JJ Rousseau
- Alex Olson
- Anthony Pappalardo
- Lucas Puig
- Eric Koston
- Mike Mo Capaldi
- Rob Welsh
- Cairo Foster
- Jeff Lenoce
- Karsten Kleppan
- Guy Mariano
- Brandon Biebel
- Marc Johnson
- JB Gillet
- Daniel Espinoza
- Raven Tershy
- Nick Jensen
- Ronnie Sandoval
- Jon Sciano
- Sebo Walker
- Danny Brady
- Jesus Fernandez
- Rick McCrank
- Tony Hawk
- Yonnie Cruz

=== Videography ===
- Australia/NZ Tour (2001)
- Beware Of The Flare (2002)
- Canada Eh? (2004)
- The Red Flare Tour (2006)
- EMB Carroll (2007)
- Fully Flared (2007)
- The Final Flare! (2008)
- Fully Trippin' in Malaga (2008)
- Voltage (2010)
- Am I Am (2010)
- 2010 Video Collection (2010)
- Transworld's Skate & Create "LAKAIromania" (2010)
- Getting Nordical Tour (2010)
- Stupor Tour (2014)
- Stay Flared (2015) (with Emerica Footwear)
- The Flare (2017)
- Flare Canada (2019)
- Street Safari (2019)
- Bubble (2023)

== Royal Trucks ==
Royal Skateboard Trucks logo

Royal Trucks is a company in Torrance, California that makes skateboard trucks, the axle-like structures to which a skateboard's wheels are attached, and apparel. According to Transworld Business and Chocolate Skateboards, the company was founded in 1999 by Rudy Johnson and Guy Mariano.

=== Team Riders ===
- Griffin Gass
- Vincent Alvarez
- Rowan Davis
- Zach Allen
- Stevie Perez
- Dougie George
- James Capps
- Leo Takayama
- Eddie Vargas
- Coles Bailey
- Chad Poore
- Mike Carroll
- Rick Howard
- Andrew Brophy
- Nico Hiraga
- Jeron Wilson
- Justin Eldridge
- Jesus Fernandez
- Kevin Taylor
- Josh Gomez
- Diego Johnson

== Girl Films & Chocolate Cinema ==
Girl Films has been the company name that has been used for all of the Girl Distribution video productions. In early 2013, longtime videographer/director/editor for Girl Films Ty Evans announced his departure from the company and Italian videographer/director Federico Vitetta has become more involved with film work for the company since Evans' departure. Evans was primarily responsible for the Yeah Right!, Hot Chocolate, Fully Flared, and Pretty Sweet productions.

=== Pretty Sweet ===
Both the Girl and Chocolate teams were involved with the filming of the Pretty Sweet video production — the world premiere of the video occurred on November 16, 2012, at the Orpheum Theater in Los Angeles, California, US (the commercial release date for the video is November 27, 2012). The video includes parts from the team members of both brands and was the first full-length Girl Distribution Company video to feature a part from Sean Malto.

Filming for Pretty Sweet occurred in numerous global locations, including Nicaragua, Costa Rica, Panama, China, Barcelona, and Berlin. Evans also explained that, due to commitments for his next feature film, Jonze's involvement was limited, but he conducted a week's worth of filming, contributed ideas, and participated in creative meetings for the production.

The video was a winner at the 15th Annual Transworld SKATEboarding Awards event, held at the Avalon Hollywood in Hollywood, California, US, and received the Best Video award over DGK's Parental Advisory and Transworld's The Cinematographer Project. In February 2013, Evans predicted that Pretty Sweet would surpass Lakai's Fully Flared as the best-selling skateboard video of all time. He explained that two months after the video's release it had achieved similar sales figures to the Lakai film, and that the video "was #1 in the Sports and Documentary categories on iTunes and overall out of all the films it was #2."

== Causes ==
In 2012, Girl was listed as a partner of the (RED) campaign, together with other brands such as Nike, American Express, and Converse. The campaign's mission is to prevent the transmission of HIV from mother to child by 2015 (the campaign's byline is "Fighting For An AIDS Free Generation").
