= Alex Olson =

American skateboarder

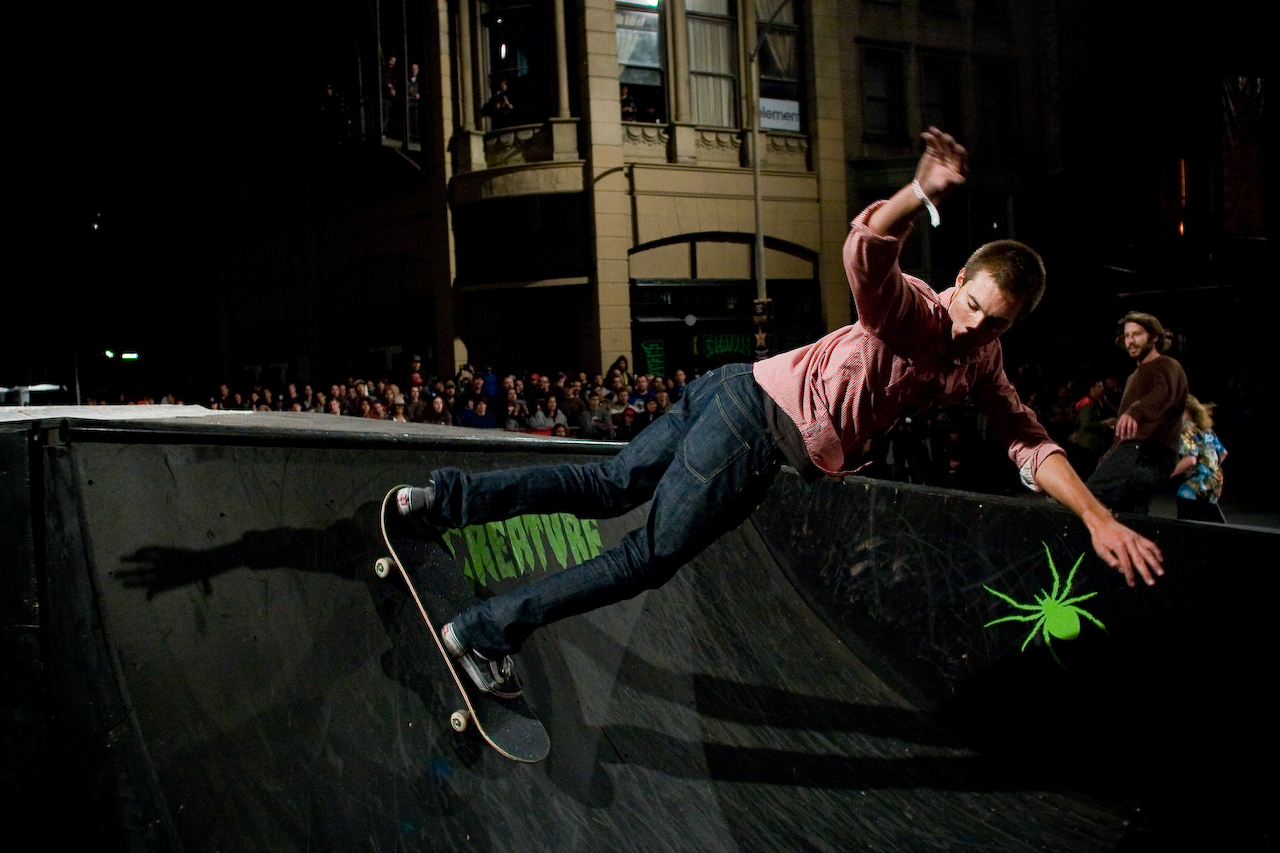
- Olson in 2008

Personal information
- Full name: Alex Olson
- Born: 1986 (age 39–40) Santa Monica, California, U.S.
- Website: olsonstuff.com

Sport
- Country: United States
- Sport: Skateboarding

Alex Olson (born 1986) is a goofy-footed American professional skateboarder, company owner, and entrepreneur. Olson runs the companies Call Me 917 and Bianca Chandon.

== Biography ==
=== Early life ===
Son of Steve Olson, Alex's first memory of skateboarding was of Christian Hosoi doing airs on a Half-pipe while talking on a wireless phone when he was six years old. Olson grew up in Santa Monica with his mother until the age of ten, when he moved to Malibu to live with his father, former-professional skateboarder Steve Olson. In Malibu he started skating. According to his father, he came home one day and made an announcement: “Yo, I'm a skateboarder.” His interest in skating reignited his father's interest.

Olson saw his first skate video, Toy Machine: Welcome to Hell, at a sleepover. His two favorite parts were Donny Barley and the fall section. At a young age, Olson found the artistic nature of Jason Dill's part in the Alien Workshop Photosynthesis video (2000) influential. As a young skater, he looked up to: Andrew Reynolds, Jim Greco, Erik Ellington.

=== New York City ===
Olson first visited New York in 2005 when Jason Dill, at the height of his career, bought Olson a ticket to NYC in response to a MySpace message: “Hey, I would love to come to New York.” Olson flew there and saw the New York skate and cultural scene first hand for the first time. The scene that Jason Dill was part of in 2005 was thriving, including the popular skateboarding-influenced artists like Dan Colen and Dash Snow. Olson decided to move to NYC from California. He would live with Jason Dill for a bit. Olson also lived with Mark Gonzales for two months. While living with the Gonz, Olson would feed the cats.

=== Creative Practice ===
In addition to skateboarding and running two companies; Olson designs for the companies, collects music, DJs, and practices meditation.

Olson has also modeled for the fashion label Eckhaus Latta, walking the runway for their Spring 2018 show. Olson included a clip of the runway walk in his skate part for The 917 Video, explaining the situation to The Bunt podcast:

"These young kids have this brand Eckhaus Latta, and the kids that are around the area that they use are in the scene, so they asked [my girlfriend] if I wanted to walk the show...I didn't want to...what's the point?...I don't need the fucking Slap message-board to be going off...I was telling Logan... [but] if we film it..and put it in my video part..it would be hilarious to throw that in your part...as a trick..it's ridiculous and kinda good at the same time...so I got the hammer.”

== Professional Skateboarding career ==
Alex Olson turned pro for Girl in 2007/2008.

“As a kid growing up, I never thought I would get sponsored by them because they were at such a higher level,”

Olson began skating for Girl through his friendship with Guy Mariano. During this period, he frequently skated with Mike Carroll at the Berrics while the Girl team was filming the Lakai video Fully Flared. Before joining Girl, Olson had also considered skating for Antihero.[5]

After Fully Flared came out, Olson quit the Lakai team and joined Vans. After Vans, Olson joined Nike SB.

After the Girl and Chocolate video Pretty Sweet came out, Olson felt disappointed and quit Girl. He wanted to start a company with a friend. He briefly planned to join Brian Anderson at 3D Skateboards before quitting before the company opened.

Olson wanted to start a company with longtime friend Dylan Rieder, they initially planned to collaborate but Dylan pulled out. Olson decided to start his own company.

In 2007, Olson got 2nd place at the Vans Downtown Showdown Real Sacto Rebate.

Olson is currently sponsored by:

- Call Me 917
- Ace Trucks
- Spitfire
- Supreme
- Nike SB

== Media ==
Olson was on the cover of the May 2015 issue of Transworld Skateboarding doing a backside 50 50.

Skate Video	Year
The 917 Video 2	2019
The 917 Video	2017
Sure	2015
Wet Dream	2014
Supreme- "cherry"	2014
Dece Vid	2013
Girl/Chocolate - Pretty Sweet	2012
Girl - Outbackwards	2010
Girl/Anti Hero - Beauty and The Beast 3	2010
Independent - 30th Anniversary Europe Tour	2009
Girl/Anti Hero - Beauty and The Beast 2	2009
Girl - Yanks on Planks	2008
Girl/Anti Hero - Beauty and The Beast	2008
Lakai - The Final Flare!	2008
Krooked - Gnar Gnar	2008
Girl/Chocolate - Badass Meets Dumbass	2007
Lakai - Fully Flared	2007
Chocolate - A Little Chunk of Chocolate	2006

== Companies ==
Olson founded Bianca Chandon and Call Me 917 unintentionally simultaneously. He started out by introducing Bianca Chandon via the number (917)692-2706 (sometimes written as 917-692-2706). If you would call the number you would get an answering machine that said hello you have reached Bianca Chandon. Once Olson started releasing Bianca Chandon unisex clothing, he abandoned the number because it had lost its function, and as of 2019 it simply says "leave a message". He released some boards, for himself and others, under the Bianca Chandon name but as the company was taking form he did decide he did not want it to become a skate company.

Olson did not envision a team for Bianca Chandon; however, he meet some kids he wanted to support them and start a team so he brought the number back and founded a separate company. Olson compares it to Polo:

...like how Ralph Lauren has the brand Ralph Lauren and he has Polo by Ralph Lauren. So 917 started to take shape slowly, it took some time for people to get to know the brand, understand the brand, and for us to build a team around it.

His two brands, Bianca Chandon and Call Me 917, have made him "a highly visible model of the self-taught skater-turned-entrepreneur."
