= Jonnie Craig =

British photographer

Jonnie Craig (born 13 July 1988) is a British photographer who first emerged in the 2008 annual Vice Magazine photo issue, a publication he continues to contribute to regularly. In February 2009, Craig had his first homonymous book published with Mörel Books. Alongside this, he released Nothing In Particular, a zine given away with the first 50 copies of the Jonnie Craig book.

Craig spent two years as the picture editor of HUH.Magazine,. In August 2010, Craig curated an exhibition at the Scion Gallery in Los Angeles including artists like Peter Sutherland, Jerry Hsu and Patrick O'Dell, among others.

April 2012 saw the release of Craig's first film work, entitled IKYITHWMEL, a short film about skateboarding which was first broadcast on UK terrestrial television station Channel 4. Shortly after the release of the film, Craig released his second book, I'll Kick You In The Head With My Energy Legs, through Dokument Press, a Swedish-based art book publisher. The book focusses on the lives of a group of skateboarders. It doesn't, however, cover the act of skateboarding itself. The series was first exhibited alongside fellow artists Ed Templeton, Jerry Hsu and Kevin Long at the Steinsland Berliner Gallery in Stockholm, Sweden in 2010.

== Exhibitions ==
- 2010 – Steinsland Berliner – Group Show – W / Ed Templeton, Jerry Hsu & Kevin Long - Stockholm
- 2010 – Scion Gallery- Group Show – W / Various artists – Los Angeles
- 2010 – Nada Art Fair – W / Mörel books – Miami
- 2009 – Space 15 Twenty – The Company Of People – Group Show – Los Angeles
- 2009 – Lieu Unique – Group Show – Paris
- 2009 – Roma Photo Festival – Group Show – I Thought I Was Alone
- 2009 – Claire De Rouen Gallery – Solo show/book launch – London
- 2009 – Galleri Hangups – Solo Show – Stockholm
- 2008 – Fallon Worldwide group show – Fallon Gallery London
- 2008 – Vice Photo Book Group show – The Jago gallery
- 2008 – I Thought I was alone – exhibition & ZINE launch – Jaguar shoes Gallery
- 2007 – Vice Photo issue gallery tour – June/July/August – Berlin, Hamburg, Munich, Frankfurt, Kassel.
- 2007 – Studio Apart – Group show – Amsterdam

== Publications ==
- IKYITHWMEL – Selected works. 2009, 2010, 2011 & 2012 – Limited 1000 copies – Published by Dokument Press May 2012 ISBN 978-9-185639-51-9
- Jonnie Craig – Selected works. 2007 & 2008 – Limited 750 copies – Published by Mörel Books February 2009 ISBN 978-1-907071-05-8
- Nothing In Particular – Selected works 2005 & 2006 – Limited 50 copies – Published by Mörel Books February 2009 ISBN 978-1-907071-06-5
- Nicholas – Selected works. 2009 – Limited 150 copies – Published by The Company of People
- I Thought I Was Alone – Exhibition Catalogue – Limited 500 copies – Published by ITIWA – 2008
- Untitled – Selected works. 2008 – hand made and numbered – Limited 5 copies – 2008
