= Breana Geering =

Canadian skateboarder (born 1998)

Breana Geering (born 1998) is a Canadian goofy-footed professional skateboarder.

== Skateboarding career ==
Geering is the first woman to ride for Girl Skateboards.

In 2018, Geering won 1st place in the Advanced category at the 4th Annual Stop, Drop, and Roll ladies' skate contest at Quilchena Park in Vancouver, Canada. Also in 2018, Geering placed 3rd at the Montreal-based EMPIRE Am Getting Paid contest. Geering is being discussed as a candidate to represent Canada in the 2020 Olympics in the women's Skateboard Street competition. In 2019, Geering participated in Skate Like A Girl's "Wheels of Fortune 10" event.

=== Skate video parts ===
- 2018: Out For A Rip – Girl skateboards
- 2019: Courtesy – Vans Canada
- 2020: Nervous Circus – Girl skateboards
- 2025: Splinter – Girl skateboards
