= Marc Johnson (skateboarder) =

American professional skateboarder (1977–2026)

Personal information
- Nickname: Chauncey Peppertooth
- Born: January 6, 1977 Winston-Salem, North Carolina, U.S.
- Died: May 26, 2026 (aged 49) San Jose, California, U.S.

Sport
- Country: United States
- Sport: Skateboarding

Marc Johnson (January 6, 1977 – May 26, 2026) was an American professional skateboarder. He was known for his creative and passionate approach to skateboarding and was awarded Thrasher Magazine's Skater of the Year in 2007.

== Skateboarding Career ==
=== Early Career ===
Marc Johnson moved from North Carolina to San Diego in 1994 , where he began riding for Maple Skateboards. He then moved to San Jose where he began skating with the crew of skateboarders that became known as the Tiltmode Army. During this time he also began riding for Emerica Shoes and appeared in their video Yellow, followed by two pro model shoes for the brand. Rodney Mullen added him to the A-Team skateboards brand. He had a Pro Files spotlight in 411 Video Magazine Issue 20 followed by a section in Best Of 411, Volume 4. Johnson then had the cover and opening section of the Transworld Skateboarding Video Modus Operandi. He then left Emerica to join Lakai Limited Footwear.

=== Enjoi Skateboards ===
Unsatisfied with the direction of A-Team skateboards, Johnson launched the board company Enjoi with support from Rodney Mullen. The company broke from skateboarding tradition by having humorous deck graphics and irreverent magazine ads that did not feature skateboarding, as well as a bright palette of blue, yellow, and orange. He brought on his Tiltmode Army friends Jerry Hsu and Louie Barletta from Maple to the team.

=== Chocolate Skateboards ===
Due to burnout from riding for and running Enjoi, as well as frustration with Dwindle distribution, Marc left Enjoi in the hands of Louie Barletta and Matt Eversole. From travelling with the Lakai team he received an offer to ride for the Chocolate Skateboards. He appeared as the first skater in the Chocolate Skateboards section in the Yeah Right! video. This was followed the Hot Chocolate Tour of the United States, which became a full-length tour video directed by Ty Evans and Spike Jonze. This was followed by his section in the Girl and Chocolate Skateboards joint venture Pretty Sweet.

=== Back Forty ===
The "Back Forty" project was launched in mid-2013/early 2014 and is a collaboration between Johnson, Kenny Anderson and Chris Roberts. Johnson asserted in a March 2014 interview that, while the project sells products, it is not a "company." On the "About" section of the Back Forty's Facebook page, the project is self-defined as a commitment to: "Becoming the voice for what skateboarding has to say for itself." Johnson further explained: "We have tons of ideas that don't belong anywhere else ... Back Forty's a home for all the ideas that we have that don't really vibe with anything else that we're involved in."

Johnson appeared on episode #36 of The Nine Club hosted by Chris Roberts. While technically unrelated to The Back Forty, The Nine Club podcast shows a clear vision of furthering the missions of the latter project and generating skateboarding culture, history, and business content by and for skateboarders.

=== Leaving Lakai Limited Footwear for Adidas Footwear and departure from Chocolate ===
Marc Johnson accepted an offer to ride for Adidas's skateboarding program in 2016. The public announcement came at the premiere for the Adidas full-length skate video Away Days. During an interview with Jenkem Magazine, Mike Carroll, co-owner of Lakai and Chocolate, claimed he knew of his impending departure but he and other riders were caught off-guard by Johnson's appearance in the video. Carroll subsequently removed Johnson from Chocolate Skateboards professional roster.

=== Business & Co ===
In 2018, Johnson started a skateboard company called Business & Company.

== Personal life and death ==
Johnson was born in Winston-Salem, North Carolina, on January 6, 1977. He stated that he had a rough upbringing as a child, and finding skateboarding changed his life. His mother and a neighbor gave him $80 to move to California.As of August 2012, Johnson's residence was in Crestline, California.

Johnson died on May 26, 2026, at the age of 49. No cause of death was announced. He is survived by his son, Avery.

== Legacy ==
In 2004 Marc Johnson was voted "Street Skater of the Year" at the sixth annual Transworld skateboarding awards by his fellow professional skateboarders. For his three-song part in Fully Flared Johnson was awarded Thrasher Skater of the Year in 2007.

Marc Johnson was known for offering intellectual opinions on the creative side of skateboarding. In a 2007 Thrasher interview, Johnson explained his inspiration in the following manner:

I've wondered about that. This is going to sound bizarre to most people, but ALL inspiration comes from something similar to the way a radio works. If you imagine that everything ever known or will be known exists between the lowest and the highest frequencies, we simply either stumble upon a brilliant song accidentally, or we spend our lives searching for great songs and find them where we may. Invention works like that. I think Tesla said something to that effect: We are simply filters for Divine Knowledge.

Professional skateboarder Paul Rodriguez included Johnson in his "top ten" list of favorite professional skateboarders in July 2013. Rodriguez praised Johnson as "a boss" with "incredible style" and "incredible technical capabilities." The list was published on Rodriguez's personal website and he concluded with the statement, "I think he is one of the all time greats for sure."

In a eulogy published in Closer Skateboarding Magazine, filmmaker Spike Jonze said:

"The first time I really got to hang out with Marc and get to know him was during the Hot Chocolate Tour. It was summer of 2003, and I went down to his house with Ty to interview him before we left. I don't know what I expected, but I didn't expect to meet someone who thought like he did. In the interview he said he thought of skateboarding as ideas put into motion; that skateboarding was mostly mental, and that if you could think of it, you could probably do it on a skateboard. I remember as soon as he said it, I thought this guy is not the average skater.

During that tour, I became fascinated with Marc. When we would skate, he was always goofing, playing, making jokes, doing characters, but then he would slowly home in on something he wanted to try and disappear into another place....

There was no one like Marc. No one who made me laugh like he did with his voices and characters. No one that skated like him. And no one who loved like him. He loved like he skated - with all of himself."

== Videography ==
- Maple: Rites of Passage (1994)
- Etnies: High 5 (1995)
- Maple: Promo (1995)
- Transworld: Uno (1996)
- Maple: Seven Steps To Heaven (1996)
- NC Board Shop: Montage (1996)
- 411VM: Best Of 411, Volume 4 (1997)
- 411VM: Issue 20 (1997)
- Emerica: Yellow (1997)
- Transworld: Modus Operandi (2000)
- Transworld: Anthology (2000)
- NC: Tilt Mode! (2000)
- ON Video: Spring 2001 (2001)
- ON Video: Summer 2001 (2001)
- Tilt Mode Army: Man Down (2001)
- Thrasher: Jaded (2002)
- Lakai: Beware Of The Flare (2002)
- 411VM: Issue 60 (2003)
- Girl: Yeah Right! (2003)
- Closure (2003) – independent Dan Wolfe production
- Chocolate: Hot Chocolate (2004)
- Chocolate: Se Habla Canuck (2004)
- Girl: What Tour? (2005)
- Lakai: The Red Flare Tour (2005)
- Elwood: 1st & Hope (2006)
- Matix: Grateful Shred Tour (2006)
- Lakai: Fully Flared (2007)
- Girl/Chocolate: Badass Meets Dumbass (2007)
- Lakai: The Final Flare! (2008)
- Lakai: 2010 Video Collection (2010)
- Lakai: Voltage (2010)
- Thrasher: King Of The Road 2011 (2011)
- Girl/Chocolate: Pretty Sweet (2012)
- Lakai: Lost & Lakai'd (2013)

Johnson stated in a 2012 interview that he has selected the music for all of his career video parts.
