= Jerry Hsu =

American skateboarder, photographer, and company owner

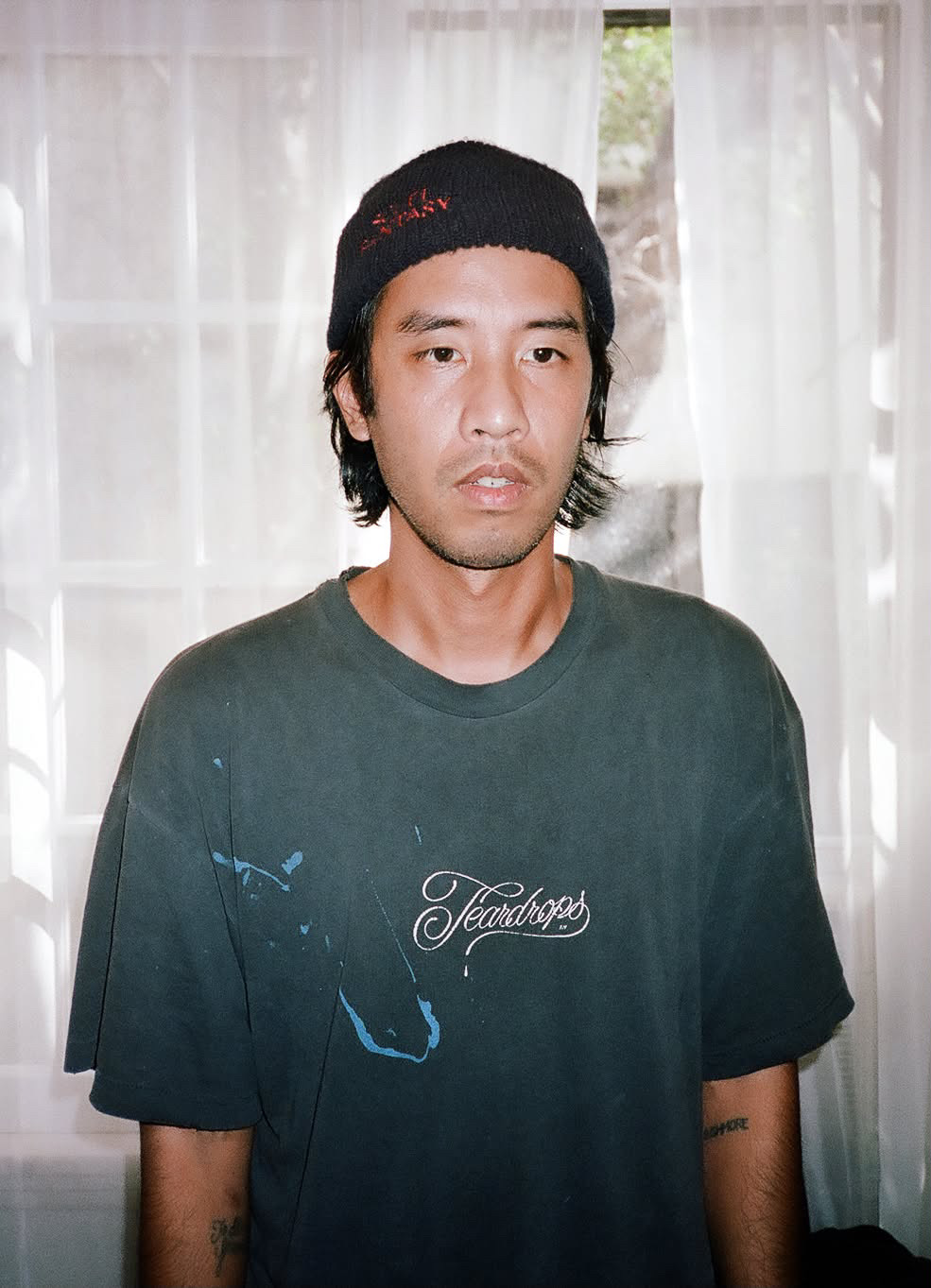

Personal information
- Nickname: The Asian Elvis
- Born: December 17, 1981 (age 44) San Jose, California, U.S.
- Height: 5 ft 7 in (170 cm)

Sport
- Country: United States
- Sport: Professional skateboarding

Jerry Hsu (born December 17, 1981) is a Taiwanese-American skateboarder, photographer and owner/operator of the skate company "Sci-Fi Fantasy".

== Early life ==
As of 2007, Hsu's family home remains located in San Jose, California, United States (U.S.). Hsu's family is originally from Taiwan, and his parents speak both English and Mandarin Chinese. Hsu explained in 2010 that his Chinese-language fluency is akin to a "third grader."

Hsu started skateboarding in the early 1990s and he explained what he was attracted by in a 2013 interview: "I remember the reason I started skating was because I saw these kids with green hair and big pants and they looked so stupid, and I wanted to be that." His mother brought home a discarded concrete parking block during his early period of skateboarding and he later regarded the gesture as "very thoughtful."

== Professional skateboarding ==
=== 1996–2001: Maple, The Storm and Tilt Mode Army ===
Hsu's first skateboard deck sponsor was Maple, where he was a team member alongside Marc Johnson (skateboarder), who facilitated his recruitment, Louie Barletta, Chad Bartie, and Chad Knight, among others. After he joined Maple, Hsu appeared in a promotional video for the northern California retail outlet NC Board Shop's clothing line, called "NC Clothing," alongside other sponsored riders, such as Gershon Mosely and Pancho Moler. Released in 1996, Montage runs for a duration of 30 minutes and also indicates that Hsu was sponsored by a brand named "Sutters" at the time.

The first Maple advertisement announcing Hsu's professional status with the brand was published in 1999, when he was 17 years old, and featured the tag line: "Not another brick in the wall." Hsu appeared in the 1999 Maple video Black Cat, which also featured Barletta. Around the same period, Hsu was first sponsored by the Osiris Shoes company, which had rebranded itself after it was first launched as "Evol Casuals" during the preceding two years.

Although he was not yet a professional for Osiris, Hsu appeared in the 1999 Osiris video The Storm. His video part garnered attention for a never-before-seen trick that became known as a "Storm flip”, in which the skateboarder performs a "nollie backside 180 kickflip”, and while still in midair, adds a "late front-foot kickflip" before landing on the ground (a nollie trick is executed at the front end of the skateboard). In a May 2013 interview, Hsu explained that he is still asked to perform the trick on a frequent basis, but he tries not to perform Storm flips, as they are "too busy" and he feels embarrassed. Hsu also said that he enjoyed this time period with Osiris, as he was able to constantly travel, including international trips, and participate in the benefits that the company was reaping from market success.

Hsu membership of the Tilt Mode Army was first revealed in 2000 with the release of the inaugural TMA video Tilt Mode!. Described as a group of skateboarder friends from the San Jose, California area, TMA's membership also consists of Johnson, Barletta, Matt Eversole, Steve Caballero, and Jose Rojo.

=== 2002–2006: enjoi and Bag Of Suck ===
Prior the dissolution of Maple, Hsu joined the enjoi company, which had been started by Johnson, who recruited both Barletta and Hsu, as they were all close friends at the time. Hsu explained that Johnson was primarily interested in Barletta to begin with, but Hsu was later included as part of a "package deal." Regarding Hsu's recruitment, Johnson said in a 2013 interview: "We stole the fuck out of this guy."

Commencement on the production of the inaugural full-length enjoi video commenced after Johnson's departure in 2003. Entitled Bag Of Suck, the video was released in 2006 and features a two-section part from Hsu as the conclusion. With a duration of just under eight minutes, the first section of the part is accompanied by Cass McCombs's "Sacred Heart", while Sonic Youth's cover version of The Carpenters' song "Superstar" is used for the second section. Hsu also joined the Ricta skateboard wheel team during the same year.

=== 2007–2012: Emerica, "Epicly Later'd" and Stay Gold ===
Following the notability and success from Bag Of Suck, Hsu underwent significant sponsorship changes, leaving WeSC clothing and Osiris for Emerica, which offered him both a shoe and apparel deal, in 2007—the tag line "GuessHsu?" was used in the promotional material. Hsu revealed in a September 2012 online interview, for the RIDE Channel's "Weekend Buzz" series, that he was offered a sponsorship deal with Nike, Inc. following the end of his contract with Osiris; however, Hsu declined the offer in favor of Emerica, due to the effect of a questionnaire that he was emailed as part of the recruitment process:

I was asked if I would want to … well, I was sent, like, a email questionnaire, that was like pre-written. Like it seemed just like it was this pre-written thing, towards … like it was totally impersonal. It was, ah, like, "What do you like about Nike? What do you think you can bring to Nike? What like, ah, blah, blah, blah, blah, bah. Like I don't even know if it was, like, a serious consideration that I could ride for them, but, yeah, when I read that thing, like, this was kinda, like, if this is their deal, then I don't really, I'm not really into it.

The Vice web video series "Epicly Later'd" published its "Jerry Hsu" episode in May 2007, which is hosted and created by Hsu's friend Patrick O'dell, who was previously a staff photographer at Thrasher Magazine. Hsu received attention after the episode was released, as Hsu shows O'dell his family home—including footage of his parents—and VHS footage of Hsu skateboarding at the age of 13 years, leading O'dell to use the description "child prodigy." Johnson is also interviewed by O'dell and his high regard for Hsu is obvious:

The way that Jerry [Hsu] lives his life is, like, he lives it on his own terms. He wears what he wants to wear, he sleeps when wants to sleep—he does whatever he wants to do. And, when you're in a "business" situation, they either don't like that because they can't do that, or, they don't like that because it's not marketable, or whatever. He's kind of like an "old soul" … He's the guy that's younger than you and you look up to him.

Hsu released his first signature shoe with Emerica, the "Hsu" (including a lowtop variation that was released at a later stage, named the "Hsu Low"), in 2008. Hsu was then sponsored by the MOB skateboard griptape brand in early 2010.

Hsu followed up his first Emerica shoe with the "Hsu 2 Fusion" in 2011, which is a mid-top design that incorporates the Sole Technology invention, "STI Fusion Technology" (Sole Technology is the parent company of Emerica). Hsu explained in a corresponding promotional video that he prefers the mid-top design because it provides him with ankle protection.

The fourth TMA video, Bonus Round, was released in 2009 and also featured other enjoi riders, such as Caswell Berry, Nestor Judkins and Clark Hassler. The following year, Hsu then appeared in his first-ever Emerica full-length video, Stay Gold, for which he skated solely in switch stance during a period in which he sustained significant injuries. Stay Gold filmer Jon Miner identified Hsu's part as one of the most difficult aspects of the video's production in a 2011 interview:

There were a number of challenges, the ones that came closer to the deadline stand out the most just because of the level of stress. Jerry Hsu's constant knee/ankle injuries and what direction to take his part in was a pretty heavy one. Jerry went through hell to film that part, He got ankle surgery and two or three knee surgeries. He skated switch because he didn't have the strength in his knee to skate regular. That's how good Jerry is; he filmed an amazing part on a bad knee going the wrong way.

=== 2013–2017: Leaves Enjoi and joins Chocolate ===
New York La La La, a fashion video directed by Aaron Rose and featuring Hsu, was published on the Nowness website on September 25, 2013. Alongside fellow professional skateboarders Austyn Gillette and Josh Harmony, Hsu was dressed in designer garments for the short film, and a portrait of the three was photographed by L'Officiel Hommes editor André Saraiva.

In September 2013, Hsu announced his departure from the enjoi brand. Hsu explained in an interview that was published on October 12, 2013, that his decision was spurred by the departure of longtime brand manager Eversole who, according to Hsu, grew tired of protecting the brand from the profit-driven demands of shareholders. Barletta will take Eversole's place as enjoi's brand manager and Hsu stated: "Louie understands what enjoi is all about, so I think they can still make something really great and I wish them the best." Hsu later clarified that he received "generous" paychecks while he was with enjoi and his teammates, whom he respects "very much," were not a factor in his decision, which took a long time to make. He also revealed that the discussions about his departure mostly involved just himself and Barletta, and those conversations were "emotional and shitty" for him.

On November 12, 2013, a video was published on the Crailtap YouTube channel, the official channel of the Girl Distribution Company, in which Hsu is officially revealed as the new professional for Chocolate Skateboards, a sub-brand of Girl. The video skit features Marc Johnson, Mike Carroll, Stevie Perez, Elijah Berle, and Chris Roberts. Hsu explained in an interview why he wanted to join the Chocolate team: "It’s a family. When I walk into Rick [Howard]’s office and there are printouts of graphics on the floor and he’s hand picking them, I know this is where I wanna be."

To commemorate Chocolate's 20th anniversary in 2014, O'dell filmed a four-part retrospective for "Epicly Later'd" and enlisted Hsu as a cohost. In the first episode, published in October 2014, O'dell filmed Hsu with Girl co-owners Carroll and Rick Howard, and also asked Hsu to explain what is important about the Chocolate brand for him:

You just feel an immediate cool, like: "Welcome!" So everyone's just like, "Welcome to the family"-type thing. And all of a sudden, you're just looking at Chocolate boards, and then you're looking at Chocolate boards with your name on it. It's like a dream come true … Your name's next to Marc Johnson, Gino Iannuci, Chico [Brenes]—your heros!

=== 2017–present: Starts Sci-Fi Fantasy, leaves Chocolate and Emerica ===
In the summer of 2017 Jerry started a clothing company, "Sci-Fi Fantasy," selling out multiple limited releases within hours in early 2018. According to him it is his primary source of income, as he has no sponsors for skateboarding since October 2018, when Hsu stepped away from traditional skateboarding sponsors.

Jerry left Chocolate Skateboards in September 2017. In March 2018 his long term shoe sponsor Emerica ended its business relationship with Hsu.

== Video games ==
Hsu is a playable character in the Skate video game franchise—Skate (2007), Skate 2 (2008) and Skate 3 (2010)—developed by the Electronic Arts (EA) and Black Box companies. Hsu was selected to film his own introduction for the first installment, and then appeared in the cinematic trailers for all three games.

== Photography ==
Hsu's photography career has gradually developed since the commencement of his professional skateboarding career. Hsu contributes work to Vice magazine and, in September 2010, he exhibited a body of photographic work at the Steinsland Berliner Gallery in Stockholm, Sweden under the title "Vatican Gold," alongside Ed Templeton, Kevin Long and Jonnie Craig.

Hsu's photography project "Table For One" was published as a zine of the same name in January 2013. Sold by San Jose's Seeing Things Gallery, the zine documents Hsu's obsession with people who eat by themselves and a corresponding Tumblr blog, also of the same name, remains online as of November 2014. Grape Magazine described the "Table For One" as Hsu's "ode to being alone."

The Killing Season, Hsu's first-ever photography book was released as a limited edition product (150 copies) in March 2013 by SPA, a publishing company owned by Hsu's friend. The book is based on a Vietnam skateboarding trip, in which a group traveled from the north to the south of the country on mopeds. A video of the trip was released on the SkateBoarder magazine website in mid-2012.

The opening of Hsu's solo photographic exhibition "The Observable Universe" occurred in Los Angeles, California, U.S. on July 2, 2013. The exhibition was held at the Family Bookstore and consisted of eleven curated photographs.

Emerica asked Hsu to curate a photography book for the DVD release of the 2013 video Made. Released in September 2013, the 80-page book features Hsu's own photographs, as well as those he obtained from other photographers, including Templeton, Mike Burnett and Brian Gaberman. Hsu then released a zine of photographs (limited to 300 copies) taken of the people who photograph him as a professional skateboarder, titled "Our Moment Together," in October 2013 through Deadbeat Club.

=== "Rolling Through the Shadows" ===
Leica Camera AG, a German camera, lens and optics manufacturer, initiated an interview series with skateboard journalist Mark Whiteley (former editor of SLAP magazine) in January 2013. The series was introduced through the company's blog and is entitled "Rolling Through the Shadows"—Whiteley explains in the introduction that he will interview a selection of skateboarders that "have gravitated towards Leica M equipment", including Hsu and others, such as Templeton and Arto Saari. However, as of November 2014, Hsu was not yet interviewed for the series.

== Awards and accolades ==
Hsu won the "Best Video Part" award at the 2007 Transworld Skateboarding awards, for his part in Bag Of Suck, in addition to the "Readers' Choice" award. Transworld writer Mackenzie Eisenhour described Hsu's award-winning part in a 2009 retrospective of the first 10 recipients of the Best Video Part award: "This is what Tiltmode looks like when the gloves come off. Jerry, like Heath [Kirchart], is one of the few guys who can finesse impact-heavy skating."

Professional skateboarder Jimmy Cao selected Hsu's Black Cat video part for Thrasher Magazine's "Classics" series. Cao introduced the video by saying: "I picked Jerry's part, because he's got good style, sick trick selection, and he's just fun to watch." The magazine called the part "gnarly."

== Personal life ==
Due to the physical toll of his skateboarding, Hsu identified photography as a vocation that he would like to eventually transition into. In 2013, Hsu explained that his body is "constantly thrashed" and admitted that he is "broken." In 2011, on "Epicly Later'd," Hsu's mother expressed her opinion of Hsu's skateboarding career: "Well I'm happy for him, as I said. This is his job, not mine; it's his life, not mine, so ..."
