= Sean Malto =

American professional skateboarder

Personal information
- Nationality: American
- Born: September 9, 1989 (age 37) Havre de Grace, Maryland, U.S.
- Height: 5 ft 9 in (1.75 m)

Sport
- Country: United States
- Sport: Skateboarding
Medal record
Men's street skateboarding
Representing the United States
World Championships
| Gold medal – first place | 2011 Newark | Street |
| Bronze medal – third place | 2010 | Street |
Summer X Games
| Silver medal – second place | 2013 | Foz do Iguaçu |
Street League Skateboarding
| Gold medal – first place | 2011 | Newark |

Sean Malto (born September 9, 1989) is an American professional skateboarder.

== Early life ==
Malto is from Lansing, Kansas. He is of Euro-American and Filipino descent. Malto started skateboarding at the age of 10 after being inspired by his older brothers Travis, Justin, and Chris. He explained in a 2013 video segment for the Skullcandy brand that the Escapist Skate Shop in Kansas City supported his skateboarding from an early age and has never ceased in this role.

== Professional skateboarding ==
Malto's first skateboard deck sponsor was Girl Skateboards, and, as of April 2018, he continues to be sponsored by the company. Malto's part in the 2012 Girl/Chocolate video Pretty Sweet was remixed by Girl and Ed Banger Records. Nearly ten minutes in length, the remixed part is edited to the Justice song "Brian Vision MMXIII" and "Secam" by Mr. Oizo.

At the finals of the Kansas City stop of the 2013 SLS competition, one of Malto's skateboarding trucks was dismantled during the performance of a trick, and he was subsequently eliminated as a contender.

In November 2013, Malto suffered an extreme ankle injury that sidelined him from the professional skateboarding circuit for almost 3 years. An in-depth documentary on his recovery was uploaded to YouTube in 2016. Malto's first video part since his return is 'Nike SB: Elite Squad' part, which was uploaded to YouTube, the Berrics, and the Nike SB website.

=== Sponsors ===
As of 2017, Sean Malto's sponsors are Girl, Nike SB, Spitfire Wheels, Thunder Trucks, Beats by Dre, Diamond Supply Co., Escapist Skateboarding, Bones Bearings, Grizzly Griptape, GoPro, and Mountain Dew.

== Awards ==
- Won: Transworld Skateboarding Magazine 2009 "Rookie of the Year"
- Nominated: Transworld Skateboarding Magazine 2010 "Reader's Choice"

== Business ==
Founded by Australian surfer Josh Kerr and professional US skateboarders Mikey Taylor and Paul Rodriguez, the Saint Archer Brewing Co. is a microbrewery that is co-owned by the brand's "Ambassadors," including Malto. The team of Ambassadors includes professional skateboarders Eric Koston, Brian "Slash" Hansen, and Bryan Herman, as well as professional and non-professional surfers Taylor Knox, Dusty Payne, Laura Enever, and Jeff Johnson; former professional snowboarder Todd Richards; photographer Atiba Jefferson; and surfboard shaper Chris Christenson.

== Contest results ==
- 2010 Cph Pro - 1st
- 2011 Street League Skateboarding Championships - Won
- 2013 Cph Pro - 3rd
- 2013 X Games Foz do Iguacu - 2nd

== Videography ==
- Rough Copy
- Through Being Nice
- Escapist: Fourteen Deep
- Etnies: Sangria Nights
- Transworld: And Now
- Street Dreams
- Gatorade: Go All Day with Chaz Ortiz
- Escapist: Red and Yellow (2012)
- Girl/AntiHero: Beauty and the Beast (1 and 3)
- Girl: Outbackwards
- Girl: Yanks on Planks
- Girl/Chocolate: Badass Meets Dumbass
- Girl: Yes We CANada
- Fourstar: We're OK EurOK
- Fourstar: Gang of Fourstar
- Fourstar: A Tribe Called Mapquest
- Etnies: Arizona (2009)
- Etnies: Etnies in Japan
- Etnies: Barcelona (2008)
- Etnies: Bratwurst Jam
- Transworld: Skate and Create (2009 and 2010).
- Girl and Chocolate: Der Bratwurst Tour Ever
- Girl/Chocolate: Pretty Sweet (2012)
- Chiefs Kingdom: Sean Malto (2013)
- Greenlabel: We Are Blood
- Nike Skateboarding: "Elite Squad" (2017)
- Chocolate Chip (2017)
- Doll (2018)
- Nike Skateboarding: "Trust Fall" (2019)
- Nike Skateboarding: "Constant" (2021)

== Video game appearances ==
Malto is a playable character in the 2010 video game Tony Hawk: Shred. Malto also voices the character Shingo in Skate (2025 video game).
