= Video Days =

- Directed by: Spike Jonze
- Produced by: Spike Jonze
- Starring: Mark Gonzales; Guy Mariano; Rudy Johnson; Jordan Richter; Jason Lee
- Edited by: Spike Jonze
- Distributed by: Blind Skateboards
- Release date: 1991
- Running time: 24 minutes
- Country: United States
- Language: English

Video Days is a skateboarding video by Blind Skateboards released in 1991, which is often credited as the most important skate video of all time.

Video Days is the second movie/video directed by Spike Jonze and stars Mark Gonzales, Guy Mariano, Rudy Johnson, Jordan Richter, and Jason Lee. Legendary professional skateboarder Danny Way was briefly on Blind Skateboards from 1990–1991 and shot some footage for Video Days. However, he soon quit Blind, returning to his original team H-Street Skateboards and his footage for Video Days was omitted. A brief shot of Way can be seen during Gonzales' part in this video.

== Synopsis ==
The film starts off with footage of all 5 skaters driving around in a Blue Oldsmobile Ninety-Eight Regency accompanied to the song "Low Rider" by War; this car becomes the central theme for the video. Each skater's name is introduced while riding in the car which is then followed by footage of them performing a trick. The car then drives along a road until out of frame which then reveals a sunset overlooking a forest.

Guy Mariano's name is displayed in white writing in front of a black background thus beginning his part. Then footage of Guy performing several tricks is shown before the accompanied song ("I Want You Back" by Jackson 5) starts playing. Guy Mariano continues to primarily skate in places such as schools, car parks and streets. His part ends with him sliding a rail and being in disbelief about it.

Jordan Richter's name is then displayed while the accompanying song ("My War" by Black Flag) starts playing. Jordan then proceeds to skate primarily half-pipes and vert-based skateparks (with some footage of him skating in car parks). His part ends abruptly after he performs a no handed air and the song ends.

Mark Gonzales' name is then displayed; then footage of the 1971 film Willy Wonka & the Chocolate Factory is shown with Willy Wonka (Gene Wilder) saying "We are the music makers and we are the dreamers of dreams". The accompanying song ("Traneing In" by John Coltrane and the Red Garland Trio) starts playing. Mark then proceeds to skate a wide variety of locations including car parks, streets, ditches, basketball courts, half pipes and plazas. Short and silent snippets of Willy Wonka & the Chocolate Factory do appear throughout this part. The part ends when Mark frontside boardslides a rail and then loses his board. Then footage of a young British girl saying "I hope you've enjoyed the skateboarding and everything else, that's all folks, goodbye. And this is from...", she then gives a confused look to someone off camera.

Then footage is shown of all five skaters riding in the Blue Oldsmobile Ninety-Eight Regency interacting with various "Support our troops" protesters on the sidewalk. Jason Lee yells to the protesters the infamous line "No War for Heavy Metal!".

Rudy Johnson's name is displayed while the accompanying song ("Just Like Heaven" performed by Dinosaur Jr.) starts playing. Rudy then skates such locations as streets, car parks, plazas and Embarcadero (in San Francisco). Rudy's part ends abruptly as he performs an Ollie one foot to lipslide on a rail and almost runs into the camera.

Jason Lee's name is displayed before he addresses the camera and says "You know I'll give you a hundred bucks and I'll take you out to Benihana's if you slide that 75 foot handrail". He then pulls a face at the camera and says "I'll give you 600 tries, I'll be back next week". Then he proceeds to skate when the accompanying song ("The Knife Song" by Milk) comes on. He skates various car parks, plazas, streets, schools etc. in his part. About 3/4 of the way through his part the song changes to "Real World" by Hüsker Dü. Then a newspaper reading "AMERICA GOES TO WAR: COMPLETE COVERAGE OF THE GULF CRISIS" is shown, then Jason Lee proceeds to sing a song that goes:

"There's a war outside of your window
It's destroying our world
So take the hand of a boy and a girl
And walk down the street and sing a happy song to make the make the world better
Peace on Earth
Environment
Religion and pray to God"

His part then fades to black.

Then a voice is heard which says "There's a liquor right there, dude, so pull over, it's a yellow sign". Then "Lowrider" by War is played again as several shots of all 5 skaters drinking alcoholic beverages while riding in their signature Blue Oldsmobile Ninety-Eight Regency. The car then drives onto a narrow dirt road where it slowly starts to lose control. The car then falls off the dirt road and rolls down a big hill where it then crashes into a pile of rocks.

The credits then roll, with each skater performing a trick in slow motion, with "Cancion mixteca" by Ry Cooder playing and with "(birthdate-1991)" under the name of each skater (except for Rudy Johnson which the number 1-900-810-3611 is displayed).

== Reception ==
Video Days has had a positive feedback from critics and is considered an important part in skateboarding history and culture.

Trashfilter.com has praised Video Days stating that " 'The best skate video of all time? Really?' When you take into a number of factors into account, then you soon realise that it's a deserving title. The story behind the first video from the Blind skateboard team back in 1991 is a much-fabled tale. But strip everything back to the raw skating within and it still holds its legendary status".

Thrasher has inducted 3 out of the 5 skateboarding parts (Jason Lee, Mark Gonzales and Guy Mariano) in Video Days into their "classics" video section. Thrasher has praised Video Days saying "The Blind guys didn't set out to make skate history in 1991, and that makes this video's legendary status even better."

Huck writer Jay Riggio both praised and described his history with Video Days stating "The video was almost too much to take in. From the mind-blowing skating to the documented personalities of my heroes, absorbing it in small intervals was my only option. I can’t go as far as to say that I recognized the genius of Video Days off the bat, nor can I say that I even placed much importance on Spike Jonze’s onscreen credit back then – I had only recognized his name from photo credits in skate mags. All I knew was that Video Days made me want to skate like never before. There was magic in it that to this day seems difficult to place."

SkimTheFat reviewer "Thrashathon" rated Video Days 5 stars (out of five), stating "Video Days has become a standard for skate videos for the last 10 years and will continue for the next 10. The street skating is amazing and still fires me up to this day. It features some of the all-time best skaters, and skating that is excellent even when compared with today's standards. Throughout the 360 flips, handrails, gaps, manual variations, and bluntslides, the eclectic soundtrack fully complements the video. I would highly recommend watching this video over all other videos."

Jason Lee's impromptu song at the end of his part caught the attention of Clerks director Kevin Smith, who would later cast Lee in Smith's follow-up film Mallrats, thus launching Lee's acting career.

Although the car crash at the end was not intended to be serious, at the time, many people thought the team had actually died..

== 20th anniversary reunion ==
For their February/March 2011 issue, Skateboarder Magazine organized a reunion photo shoot with all 5 skaters to celebrate the 20th Anniversary of Video Days.

Skateboarder Magazine's photographer John Bradford quoted on skateboardermag.com "To tell you the truth I was a little jealous of Jaime Owens when he told me he’d be shooting the Video Days guys for the article. He’s usually the one holding everything together down in the office while photographers like me and Mehring are out and about shooting what needs to be shot. Plus, I’m of an age where I grew up in the ’90′s (like Jaime), and can vividly remember the earth figuratively shaking when Video Days first dropped. I have a 2 decade old nervous tick of starting to whistle the John Coltrane song from Gonz’ part, which often reminds me of how many times I watched it before and after school, and on the weekends before I went skating… so I of course started drooling over the shoot when I first heard it was coming together. Anyway I digress. As the shoot happened I tagged along to be a fly on the wall (and to help out where I could) while these dudes all got together for the first time in many years to reminisce about how they innocently and unwhittingly (sic) changed skateboarding forever. My jealousy of Jaime instantly faded and the day became one of my favorite days of my career to date, just given who was in the room and what they were all collectively there to celebrate."

A 3 part "Behind the Scenes" video series was then uploaded onto skateboardermag.com, one of which had an interview with Guy Mariano about the early days of Blind Skateboards and Video Days.

== Soundtrack ==
The soundtrack includes many types of music, including rock, jazz, pop and punk.

(In order of appearance):

1. War: Low Rider
2. Jackson 5: I Want You Back
3. Black Flag: My War
4. John Coltrane and the Red Garland Trio: Traneing In (Credited as "Some damn good jazz")
5. Dinosaur Jr.: Just Like Heaven
6. Milk: The Knife Song
7. Hüsker Dü: Real World
8. Jason Lee: There's A War Outside Your Window
9. War: Low Rider (reprise)
10. Ry Cooder: Cancion Mixteca
