= Ben Sanchez (skateboarder) =

American skateboarder

Personal information
- Nickname: Burger Boy
- Nationality: American
- Born: Benjamin Sanchez; 1975 (age 49–50)

Sport
- Country: USA
- Sport: Skateboarding

Ben Sanchez is a regular-footed American skateboarder from San Francisco, California.

== Skateboarding ==
After skating the Embarcadero daily for years, Sanchez was sponsored briefly by Blind, before joining the Chocolate team in 1994.

=== Skate videos ===
Sanchez has appeared in several Girl Distribution skate films.

Skate Video Parts	Year
Los Nueves Videos Del Paco	1995
Mouse	1996

=== Sponsors ===
Life, Blind, Chocolate

== Post-Skateboarding ==
Sanchez had a short, but memorable, career. First sponsored in 1994, Sanchez retired from skating by 1997. He transitioned to a career as an auto mechanic, in order to better support his child.
