= Mark Gonzales =

American skateboarder (born 1968)

Personal information
- Born: June 1, 1968 (age 58) South Gate, California, U.S.
- Occupations: Skateboarder, artist, company owner

Mark Gonzales (born June 1, 1968), also known as "Gonz", "the Gonz", and "the Godfather", is an American professional skateboarder and artist. A pioneer in the development of modern street skating, he is considered one of the first street-style skateboarders alongside Natas Kaupas. Gonzales and Kaupas are also credited with the first known boardslides on a handrail. Gonzales' pioneering influence on skateboarding has caused him to be known as the "God Father" of modern street skateboarding, and he was named the "Most Influential Skateboarder of All Time" by Transworld Skateboarding magazine in December 2011, where Gonzales was placed ahead of Tony Hawk (2nd) and Rodney Mullen (3rd).

== Early life ==
Gonzales was born in South Gate, California, and is of Irish and Mexican descent. Gonzales's first time ever skating was with his cousin's board at the age of 8.

== Professional skateboarding ==
Gonzales entered the skateboarding scene at the age of thirteen in South Gate, California, U.S. At the age of fifteen, Gonzales would come in to contact with Tommy Guerrero and Natas Kaupas who were developing their own styles of progressive street skating. Gonzales began pioneering a modern, innovative approach to skateboarding in a street context (subsequently dubbed "street skateboarding") His street skating actives included taking freestyle and vert tricks and employing them in a street context, developments which would end up causing Gonzales to be credited as one of the inventors of street skateboarding. He was featured on the cover of Thrasher magazine's November 1984 issue riding a board from the Alva company, his board sponsor at the time, while performing a trick known as a "beanplant".

=== Vision, Blind and ATM Click ===
Shortly after his Thrasher magazine cover, Gonzales then joined the Vision skateboard team and entered his first contest as a professional in May 1985 at the 'Sacto Streetstyle Contest' held in Sacramento, California. Soon after turning pro, Gonzalez won the 1985 NSA Sure-Grip Beach Style contest held adjacent to the pier in Oceanside, California.

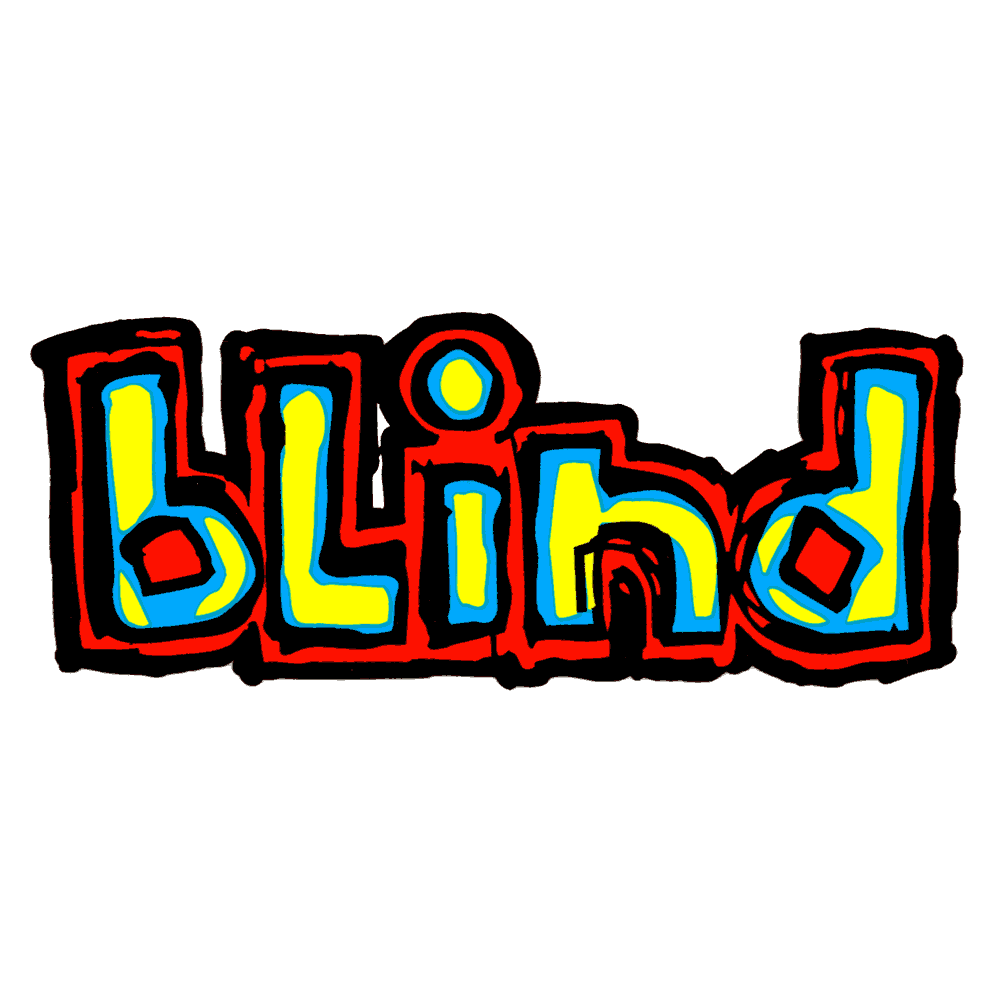
Blind Logo designed by Mark Gonzales

In 1989, Gonzales left Vision and co-founded Blind Skateboards with Steve Rocco. The company name was chosen as a slight on his former employer, Vision. Gonzales proceeded to further influence the progression of street skateboarding with the 1991 Blind Skateboards video Video Days Directed by Spike Jonze, Video Days is often credited as the most important skate video of all time. Starring Gonzales alongside Rudy Johnson, Jason Lee, Guy Mariano and Jordan Richter, Video Days paved the way for modern street skateboarding. Whilst at Blind, Gonzales also designed the original Blind Skateboards logo which is still used today. Gonzales would leave Blind in 1993, after experiencing frustrations that were similar to his time with Vision.

Gonzales then started another company called ATM Click and followed it with a venture with Ron Chatman called 60/40 who sponsored future Menace skaters Fabian Alomar and Joey Suriel. In 1993, Gonzales created controversy after he appropriated a Vision design that was used for one of his signature model boards for an ATM Click design; Gonzales then proceeded to also use the graphic for Real and Krooked signature skateboard models following his move to Deluxe Distribution.

=== Deluxe Distribution ===
Under the Deluxe Distribution company, Gonzales skated for Real Skateboards and appeared in three of the company's videos: Kicked Out of Everywhere, Non Fiction, and Real to Reel. In 2002, Gonzales then launched Krooked Skateboards in partnership with the Deluxe company and, as of February 2016, Krooked is an operational company that has released four full-length videos.

In 2007, Gonzales appeared in the skateboarding video game EA Skate and filmed a commercial to promote the game's release.

=== Sponsorship ===
As of 2013, Gonzales was sponsored by adidas, Krooked, Spitfire, Independent, and Supreme. In 2016, Gonzales joined the Pro-Tec skate team.

=== Influence ===
In the summer of 1986 Gonzales performed an ollie from one wall down to another platform at Embarcadero Plaza in San Francisco, U.S. and the obstacle had been known as the "Gonz Gap" since his completion of the trick; the trick also helped to popularize The Embarcadero as a location for skateboarding. Later that year, Gonzales - along with fellow progressive street skater Natas Kaupas - was the first person to skate handrails. Gonzales was also the first person to ollie the Wallenberg Set, a four-block, nineteen feet-long, four feet-tall gap in San Francisco, California, US.

In reference to the early era of street skateboarding, professional skateboarder Mike Vallely stated in a 2007 interview: "At the time, the best street skaters in the world were Mark Gonzales, Jesse Martinez, Tommy Guerrero, who all three were Mexican kids, and Natas Kaupas, who was a Lithuanian dude that lived at the beach in Santa Monica." In an interview for the Adidas website, Gonzales explained in reply to a question about his influence with the Blind company, "I wanted to work with my big brother doing construction—at the time I felt old, but had a young chick."

In 2006 Gonzales was awarded the Legend Award by Transworld Skateboarding, and the magazine selected him as the most influential skateboarder of all time (followed by Tony Hawk and Rodney Mullen) in December 2011.

== Art and writing ==
Mark Gonzales is an acclaimed and internationally exhibited artist. Having previously exhibited at many different galleries including; Gallery Target in Tokyo, Japan. Chandran Gallery, San Francisco, USA. Janet Borden gallery, New York, USA and the Stadtisches Museum, Abteiberg, Germany. He is currently represented by Parrasch Heijnen Galley In Los Angeles.

London-based art curator Emma Reeves has explained in an introduction that she wrote for Interview magazine: "He makes art all the time, and he has been making art in some form or another for almost as long as he has been skateboarding." In the same article Gonzales goes on to reveal that he likes creating "zines" the most, as "it is the most free thing to do. I can write anything and just put it in a zine, and then it's out there. It is like blogging but on paper.". Gonzales created over 145 zines (the exact number is unknown) which include: Non Stop Poetry: The Zines of Mark Gonzales, Dream Wheels Poems, We Know You Suck (split zine with Santa West) and Going to Love You (published by Nieves). In 2008, Drag City released a book called The Collected Fanzines that consists of reproductions of old zines that he created together with director Harmony Korine.

Gonzales was featured in the music video for the song "West Coast" by Jason Schwartzman's band, Coconut Records; the music video featured a sequence that was originally filmed in 1998 at the Stadtisches Museum, but was edited for the purpose of the music video with Gonzales' permission. Gonzales also directed and appears in the Coconut Records music video "Any Fun", alongside actress Chloë Sevigny and skateboarder Alex Olson.

Gonzales is also a published poet and author. His published body of work includes Social Problems, High Tech Poetry, Broken Dreams, and Broken Poems. Gonzales has revealed that he is constantly writing poetry.

In 2011, Gonzales designed and painted the London Flagship Supreme Store. Gonzales would send letters to the New York store entitled "Supream" during the early years of the brand. This led to many collaborations with Gonzales and Supreme, with the latest being in the S/S21 collection. Gonzales has designed sculptures and paintings for Supreme's retail locations in New York (Manhattan), San Francisco, London, Paris, Tokyo (Shibuya), Nagoya, and Osaka.

== Personal life ==
As of 2024, Gonzales resides in Paris and New York City, with his wife, Tia, and their two children.

== Filmography ==
The following is a list of films in which Gonzales appears:

- How They Get There (1992)
- Gummo (1997) – he appears in a scene in which he wrestles a chair
- Southlander (2003) Gonzales plays Vince, a good friend of the main character
- Beautiful Losers (2008) – a film about contemporary art and street culture (released on August 2, 2008)
- Jackass: Best and Last (2026) – he appears in a scene where Johnny Knoxville is electrocuted on an electric chair during a lie detector test. He can also be seen jumping over Zach Holmes with a skateboard off a ramp in the end credits. He also appears in the "Truth or Dare" bit, a deleted scene from the movie.

== Videography ==
- Sure -Grip Beach Style (1985)
- NSA 86' Vol. 4 (1986)
- Mondo Vision (1987)
- Thrasher: Savannah Slamma (1987)
- Psycho Skate (1987)
- Ohio Skateout (1988)
- All Pro Mini Ramp Jam Hawaiian Style (1989)
- Blind: Video Days (1991)
- Thrasher: The Truth Hurts (1993)
- Supreme: A Love Supreme (1995)
- Deluxe: Jim's Ramp Jam (1996)
- Real: Non-Fiction (1997)
- Deluxe: World Wide Distribution (1999)
- Real: Kicked Out of Everywhere (1999)
- Real: Real To Reel (2001)
- 411VM: Vancouver 2002 (2002)
- Streets: San Francisco (2003)
- Closure (2003)
- Thrasher: Rocket Science (2004)
- ON Video: Winter 2004 (2004)
- Fourstar: Super Champion Funzone (2005)
- Fourstar: Catalog Shoot (2005)
- Get Familiar (2006)
- McBeth - Mark Gonzales - The Journal (2006)
- Krooked: Kronichles (2006)
- Krooked: Gnar Gnar – the production was shot with an old VHS camcorder and was limited to 1000 VHS copies (2007)
- Adidas: A Five Day Excursion To Paris (2008)
- Krooked: Naughty (2008)
- Adidas: Diagonal (2009)
- Fourstar: Gang of Fourstar (2009)
- Krooked: Krook3D (2010)
- Poweredge: We Are Skateboarders (2012)
- Transworld: The Cinematographer Project (2012)
- Supreme (brand): Cherry (2014)
- Adidas : "Away Days" (2016)
- Krooked : "LSD:Let's Skate Dude" (2017)

Gonzales also appeared in the 29th part of the web series 7 Day Weekend, produced by professional skateboarder Dustin Dollin—in the episode the pair skateboard, drink beer and converse while in France.
