= Guy Mariano =

American professional skateboarder (born 1976)

- Born: March 31, 1976 (age 50); Los Angeles, California, U.S.
- Occupations: Professional skateboarder, company co-owner
- Partner: Gina Rizzo

Guy Mariano (born March 31, 1976) is an American professional skateboarder. He first gained recognition at the age of 14 for his video part in the Blind Skateboards video Video Days (1991).

== Early life ==
Mariano attended John Burroughs High School in Burbank, California.

== Professional skateboarding ==
Val Surf, a Californian retail outlet, was Mariano's first ever sponsor. Mariano's first skateboard deck sponsor was Powell Peralta and he appeared in the company's video "Ban This", alongside Paulo Diaz, Rudy Johnson, and Gabriel Rodriguez.

Together with Mark Gonzales, Jason Lee, Jordan Richter, and Rudy Johnson, Mariano appeared in the Blind video, Video Days, considered a classic achievement in skateboarding history. Skateboarder magazine brought together all of the video's members for a reunion article that celebrated twenty years since the video's release, while Gonzales has since been named the most influential skateboarder of all time by the Transworld Skateboarding magazine. Professional skateboarder, Paul Rodriguez explained in 2003 that he first saw Video Days in 1999 to better understand why his generation skated the way it did and also because the video inspired him to skateboard.

Mariano joined professional skateboarders Rodney Mullen, Jeron Wilson, Andrew Reynolds, Gershon Mosley, Ryan Wilburn, Heath Kirchart, and Mike York on a trip to Australia for the filming of a documentary entitled Canvas. The film was co-directed by Matt Hill, part owner of Globe.

Following Blind, Mariano joined the Girl Skateboards team and appeared in the video Mouse (1996). Since joining the Girl team, Mariano has appeared in every major Girl video production since the company's inception.

Following a hiatus related to illicit drug use, Mariano returned to professional skateboarding in 2005. Mariano contributed a part in Lakai Limited Footwear's skateboarding video Fully Flared and won the "Best Street", "Best Video Part", and "Readers Choice" awards at the 2008 awards event that is presented annually by the Transworld Skateboarding magazine—the video itself won the "Best Video" award. Mariano did not present a pre-written speech after receiving any of the awards and was quoted as stating, "I’m older than most of you so I’m going to cry." after his "Best Street" accolade and "I love everybody! I love skateboarding" following the announcement of the "Best Video Part" decision.

In 2012, Mariano appeared in Pretty Sweet, a collaborative video between the Girl and Chocolate brands, and received the closing video part, a symbol of a video part's excellence (often referred to as the video's "ender"). Initially, Mariano was merely going to be featured in a montage section, but after he was encouraged by the video's filmer, Ty Evans, to "focus more" on his "stuff", Mariano eventually assembled enough footage for a full video part that features a number of tricks that were filmed in China. Mariano revealed in a 2012 interview that the filming process for the video was very physically intensive and "ice baths, massage therapy and chiropractic adjustments" were factors in the completion of the part. Following his Pretty Sweet video part, a level of anticipation developed in regard to the awarding of the Skater of the Year (SOTY) trophy to Mariano by Thrasher magazine and Gary Rogers, from the Internet show, Skateline, was a significant contributor to this momentum—the award was eventually given to David González.

== Company owner ==
Mariano co-founded the Royal Trucks skateboard truck company with Rudy Johnson in 1999, and is also a part owner in the Fourstar clothing brand with Eric Koston.

== Awards and accolades ==
Following his return from an extended period of leave from professional skateboarding, Mariano received the awards for "Best Street Skater" and "Best Video Part" (for Fully Flared) at the 10th Annual Transworld SKATEboarding Awards.

Mariano received the Best Video Part award again at the 15th Transworld award event for his closing part in the Girl/Chocolate co-production Pretty Sweet.

Professional skateboarder Paul Rodriguez identified Mariano in his "top ten" list of favorite professional skateboarders in July 2013. Rodriguez stated: "He’s just one of those guys that did legendary things that people who were there witnessed and you would just hear about. Then taking such a long hiatus and coming back from that better than ever."

== Personal life ==
Mariano is Italian-American and has revealed that, at the age of 37, professional skateboarding has led to significant difficulties in his personal life:

"I made a lot of sacrifices—I missed my mom's birthdays, my girlfriend's birthdays, Thanksgiving, Christmas, because I was on skate trips. I have to put a lot of my life on hold to be a skateboarder at this age. A lot of people are moving on in life and having babies and families, but I'm still not around every weekend. It can get a little old for the people around you in your life, you know?"

He is in a long-time relationship with stylist Gina Rizzo, who was married to fellow skateboarder Justin Pierce until he died in 2000.
