= Eric Koston =

American professional skateboarder

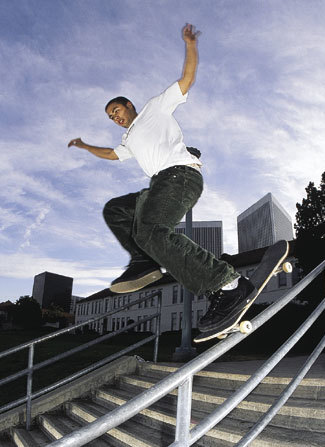

Personal information
- Nationality: American
- Born: April 29, 1975 (age 51) Bangkok, Thailand
- Occupations: Skateboarder; company owner
- Years active: 1992–present
- Height: 5 ft 10 in (1.78 m)
- Weight: 160 lb (73 kg)
- Spouse: Ashlee Gaston-Koston (m. 2007)
- Children: 1
- Website: theberrics.com

Sport
- Country: United States
- Sport: Skateboarding
- Turned pro: 1993

Eric Koston (born April 29, 1975) is a Thai-born American professional skateboarder and company owner. He has been featured in the Tony Hawk's video game series and the Electronic Arts (EA) video games Skate 2 and Skate 3. Eric Koston was named Thrasher Magazine's Skater of the Year (SOTY) in 1996

Koston co-owns both Fourstar Clothing (with Guy Mariano) and the skatepark/website "The Berrics" (with professional skateboarder Steve Berra).

== Early life ==
Eric Koston was born in Thailand, in the same hospital as fellow professional skateboarder Alphonzo Rawls (a shoe designer as of 2011). Koston was raised in San Bernardino, California, United States, and began skating in 1986. His parents are Americans.

== Professional skateboarding ==
One of Koston's first board sponsors was the H-Street company that was co-founded by Tony Magnusson and Mike Ternasky. During Koston's time with the company the team included Danny Way and Matt Hensley, but Koston sought a larger entity and later parted ways with the company. Following H-Street, in 1992, Koston joined 101 (a division of World Industries headed by Natas Kaupas) and in 1993 the Girl team and appeared in the videos Goldfish, Mouse, Yeah Right, and Pretty Sweet.

Koston was a leading team rider for the éS brand and an "Eric Koston éS Game of Skate" was held annually over numerous years. Koston also appeared in the éS video Menikmati in which he returns to his birthplace of Bangkok.

Following his departure from éS, Koston joined the Lakai roster and a video was published onto YouTube to announce the move. After joining the company in 2006, Koston filmed a part for the 2007 Lakai video Fully Flared. Koston's eventual departure for a place on the Nike SB team was accompanied by a YouTube video that parodied the George W. Bush shoe-throwing incident.

Nike SB immediately promoted Koston's recruitment to the brand's team with a signature shoe—the "Eric Koston 1" model—and a contest for consumers, entitled "Mr. Control It All".

A promotional campaign, identified by the hashtag "#thelegendgrows", was launched by Nike to coincide with release of Koston's second signature shoe model the "Eric Koston 2". An advertisement that included other Nike athletes, such as Tiger Woods, and Koston's Nike SB teammates was filmed and a behind-the-scenes video was also published on the brand's YouTube channel. Koston used the Eric Koston 2 design as a basis for a limited edition golf shoe, named the "Koston 2 IT", and a corresponding launch was held in London, UK at the 1948 Stadium store in Shoreditch. During the promotional campaign for the Eric Koston 2, Koston explained his overall experience working with Nike in comparison to the core skateboarding companies he has been sponsored by in the past:

Oh it's...it's crazy. It's completely different, I hate to say it, but it's so much better because of what...not only in the design aspect and the resources...cos I've copied so many Nike shoes, you know, I tried to mimic them as close as possible and using the best those companies, éS and Lakai could do. But we couldn't totally execute it...it was getting as good as I could get it, but it wasn't quite there. But with Nike, I get to use all those bits and pieces that I've always wanted to use, and I have access to a lot of great technology and a lot of, basically cutting-edge shit, that like, it's cool, you know. And I can really, truly, feel like I can innovate. So there's that, but not only that, they actually function; I guess from start to finish, even the marketing side of things it's above and beyond, it's crazy.

In 2016, Nike and Koston would release the "Nike SB Koston 3 Hyperfeel", taking inspiration from Nike's soccer line. This shoe would be one of the first skateboarding shoes to incorporate an ankle collar made of Flyknit material to provide support and stability. Upon the shoe's release, Koston claimed it to be "the most progressive SB [Nike Skateboarding] shoe to date".

In September 2022, Koston and Nike would drop the "Nike SB Blazer Mid" as the "Koston" edition to this line of shoes that was quickly growing in popularity in recent years. Eric took inspiration for these shoes from his more mellow family life now in his late 40's, with Nike stating "the Koston Blazer reflects his newfound passion for beachside time surfing with the fam."

As a sponsored rider for the Oakley sunglasses brand, Koston completed the "Fear and Loathing in Australia" video project that was filmed in early 2013. Accompanied by teammates, Rune Glifberg, Ryan Sheckler, and Curren Caples, Koston appears in a video that was published on June 5, 2013 and photographs that were shot by professional skateboarder Arto Saari. Koston revealed the injuries that he has sustained throughout his career on the micro-site for the project: "Nothing major. Few bad ankle sprains, dislocated finger, stitches and tendonitis in the knee. #minor."

=== Sponsors ===
As of September 2018, Koston is sponsored by the following companies: Nike SB, Skate Mental, Independent Truck Company, Spitfire Wheels, Fourstar, Diamond, Supreme, The Berrics, Oakley, Jessup, and Skullcandy. On Friday, February 20, 2015, he did a promotional spot on his Instagram account for the McDonald's Corporation, making him among the first popular professional skateboarders to advertise for the mega-chain.

=== Setup ===
In a 2009 video segment, Koston stated that his setup consisted of a Girl skateboard deck (8 and one-eighth-inch wide), Independent 139 trucks (high), 50 millimetres (2.0 in) Spitfire wheels, Bones Swiss bearings, and Bones yellow bushings (medium). Koston does not reveal the type of hardware or griptape that he used at the time, but, as of August 2012, he is sponsored by Diamond (hardware) and Jessup (griptape).

=== Departure from Girl Skateboards ===
On November 19, 2015, Girl Skateboards made the announcement that Koston, along with professional skateboarder Guy Mariano, would no longer ride for the company. The news was announced through Girl's Instagram page, captioned "Thanks for the memories". Both skaters were original team members of Girl, riding for the company for 22 years. On January 8, 2016, a picture was posted to Skate Mental's Instagram page of Koston's name on a deck. The picture was quickly deleted. Koston has stated in an interview that he will be riding Skate Mental and WKND boards while he and Guy Mariano work on their unnamed company. In December 2016, he announced the formation of Numbers Skateboards, a company with no apparent identity, but an incredibly talented team of top names and new talent.

=== EDGLRD ===
In August 2024, Koston joined EDGLRD's skateboarding team founded by Harmony Korine and led by Sean Pablo.

== Entrepreneur ==
Koston is the owner of Numbers edition skateboards along with his friend Guy Mariano. Along with friend and professional skateboarder Mariano, Koston cofounded the Fourstar clothing brand in 1996: "The year was 1996, Guy Mariano and I had no clothing sponsors, and at that point in our lives we had purchased enough Polo, Hilfiger and Nautica gear to think, hey, maybe we should start a clothing company." As of July 2013, Fourstar sponsors a team of thirteen skateboarders and has released four videos. Koston was also a part-owner of the Lakai shoe brand that, like Fourstar, is distributed by Crailtap.

The Berrics is a privately owned, indoor skatepark owned by Koston and Steven Berra. It is also a website that features content filmed in the skatepark, as well other skateboard-related media. The facility's name is a portmanteau of the owners' names (the "Ber" of Berra's surname and the "ric" of Koston's first name).

Founded by professional Australian surfer Josh Kerr and professional US skateboarders Mikey Taylor and Paul Rodriguez, the Saint Archer Brewing Co. is a microbrewery that is co-owned by the brand's "Ambassadors," including Koston. The team of Ambassadors includes professional skateboarders Sean Malto, Brian "Slash" Hansen, and Bryan Herman; professional and non-professional surfers Taylor Knox, Dusty Payne, Laura Enever, and Jeff Johnson; former professional snowboarder Todd Richards; photographer Atiba Jefferson; and surfboard shaper Chris Christenson.

== Influence ==
Koston has been described as the "Michael Jordan of skateboarding" by teammate and professional skateboarder Brandon Biebel. Paul Rodriguez has identified Koston as the person that he would most like to model his career after and explained Koston's significance in a July 2013 interview: "This guy to me is the end all, be all. You got to understand, this guy, he's my 100% role model in life. I studied everything he's ever done. You know, I love this guy, he's my favorite skater—period." Rodriguez also stated that his all-time favorite video parts are those of Koston.

== Video games ==
- Tony Hawk's Pro Skater 2 (2000)
- Tony Hawk's Pro Skater 3 (2001)
- Tony Hawk's Pro Skater 4 (2002)
- Tony Hawk's Underground (2003)
- Tony Hawk's Underground 2 (2004)
- Tony Hawk's Pro Skater HD (2012)
- Tony Hawk's Pro Skater 1 + 2 (2020)
- Tony Hawk's Pro Skater 3 + 4 (2025)
- Skate It (2008)
- Skate 2 (2009)
- Skate 3 (2010)

== Contest results ==
Event	1996	1997	2000	2001	2002	2003	2004	2005	2006	2007	2008
Summer X Games 1, "park"	1st										
Summer X Games 2, "park"		3rd									
Summer X Games 5, "park"			1st								
Summer X Games 6, "street"				1st							
Summer X Games 6, "park"				1st							
Summer X Games 6, "best trick"				1st							
Melbourne Global World Cup, "street"					1st						
Vancouver Slam City Jam, "street"					1st						
Cleveland Gravity Games, "street"					1st						
Summer X Games 7, "park"					1st						
Vancouver Slam City Jam/VTC#1, "street"						1st					
Boost Mobile Vegas Pro Invitational, "street"						1st					
Cleveland Gravity Games, "street"						4th					
X Games 8 Global, "park"						1st					
Summer X Games 8, "street"						1st					
Summer X Games 8, "park"						1st					
Summer X Games 8, "best trick"						1st					
Goofy VS Regular, "street"							2nd				
X Games 9, "street"							1st				
World Cup Season Ender, "street"								1st			
Dew Tour Season Ender, "street"								1st			
Dew Action Sports Tour, "park"								1st			
Van's Downtown Showdown, "stair set"								1st			
Van's Downtown Showdown, "bank to bank"								1st			
West 49 Canadian Open, "street"								1st			
West 49 Canadian Open, "rail"								1st			
Dew Tour, "park"									1st		
X Games 11, "street"									1st		
Tampa Pro, "street"										1st	
X Games 12, "street"										5th	
Event	1996	1997	2000	2001	2002	2003	2004	2005	2006	2007	2008

== Filmography ==
- crap (2001)
- Ultimate X: The Movie (2002)
- Jackass: The Movie (2002)
- Jackass 3D (2010)
- The Motivation (2013)

== Television ==
- Jackass Backyard BBQ (2002)
- MTV Cribs (1 episode, 2003)
- Rob Dyrdek's Fantasy Factory (three episodes, 2009, 2010)
- Maloof Money Cup (2008)
- The Aquabats! Super Show! (2013) (cameo appearance with Tony Hawk)
- Knife Fight (1 episode, 2013)
- Jablinski Games (1 episode, 2020)

== Videography ==
- Union: Right to Skate (1992)
- 101: WWII Report (1992)
- H-Street: Next Generation (1992)
- Girl: Goldfish (1993)
- 101: Falling Down (1993)
- 411VM: Issue 2 (1993)
- 411VM: Issue 3 (1993)
- 411VM: Best of 411, Volume 1 (1994)
- Etnies: High 5 (1995)
- Transworld: Uno (1996)
- Girl: Mouse (1996)
- Eastern Exposure: Zero (1996)
- Duck Cinema (1997)
- Chocolate: The Chocolate Tour (1999)
- 411VM - Brazilian Vacation (1999)
- 411VM - The First Step (1999)
- éS: Menikmati (2000)
- Big Brother: Crap (2001)
- Tony Hawk's Gigantic Skatepark Tour (2001)
- OP King of Skate (2002)
- Transworld: Chomp on This (2002)
- 411VM - Vancouver 2002 (2002)
- éS: Germany Tour 2002 (2002)
- Thrasher: King of the Road 2003 (2003)
- Girl: Yeah Right! (2003)
- Closure (2003)
- 411VM: Issue 60 (2003)
- Thrasher: S.O.T.Y. Video (2003)
- éS: Europe Tour 2003 (2003)
- Girl: Harsh Euro Barge (2003)
- Thrasher: King of the Road 2004 (2004)
- Fourstar: Catalog Shoot (2005)
- Fourstar: Super Champion Funzone (2005)
- Girl: What Tour? (2005)
- Globe: The Global Assault (2006)
- Girl: Yes We CANada (2006)
- Chocolate: Hittin' Britain & Oui Will Rock You (2006)
- Lakai: Fully Flared (2007)
- The Berrics: Battle Commander (2007)
- Girl/Chocolate: Badass Meets Dumbass (2007)
- Fourstar: A Tribe Called Mapquest (2008)
- Lakai: The Final Flare! (2008)
- Girl/Anti Hero: Beauty and The Beast (2008)
- Girl: Yanks on Planks (2008)
- Girl/Anti Hero: Beauty and the Beast 2 (2009)
- Nike SB: Don't Fear the Sweeper (2010)
- Thrasher: King of the Road 2010 (2010)
- Girl/Chocolate: Der Bratwurst Tour Ever (2010)
- Girl/Anti Hero: Beauty and the Beast 3 (2010)
- Girl: Outbackwards (2010)
- Thrasher: King of the Road 2011 (2011)
- Girl: Unbeleafable (2011)
- Girl/Chocolate: Pretty Sweet (2012)
- Supreme: cherry (2014)
- Nike SB: "Chronicles 3" (2016)
- Dime Glory Challenge (2022)
- Dranochugger III: Hell On Earth (2023)
