= Mike Carroll (skateboarder) =

American skateboarder (born 1975)

- Born: Michael Shawn Carroll; August 24, 1975 (age 50); San Francisco, California, U.S.
- Occupations: Professional skateboarder, company owner
- Known for: Girl Skateboards, Lakai Limited Footwear, EA Skate

Michael Shawn Carroll (born August 24, 1975) is a professional skateboarder from Daly City, California. He is the co-founder and vice-president of Girl Skateboards and the co-founder of Lakai Limited Footwear. He was also instrumental in the creation of the Chocolate Skateboards subdivision of Girl. Furthermore, Carroll is known for being in the vanguard of innovative, technical, and stylish street skateboarding in the early 1990s and beyond. The success of skateboarding videos like Hokus Pokus, Ban This!, and Video Days firmly ensconced street as the premier variation of skating (a position formerly held by vert skateboarding).

== Career ==
Carroll's first sponsors were H-Street skateboards, Concrete Jungle, and FTC skate shop in San Francisco. When Concrete Jungle closed in 1988, Carroll became a founding member of the FTC skate shop team along with brother Gregg Carroll, Jovontae Turner, and Rick Ibaseta. H-Street was a skateboard company founded by Tony Magnusson and Mike Ternasky. Carroll was featured in video parts on H-Street's Shackle Me Not (1988), Hokus Pokus (1989), and This Is Not The New H-Street Video (1990). In 1991, Carroll joined the prestigious Plan B team that Ternasky left H-Street to form. After the foreclosure of H-Street and the death of Plan B owner Mike Ternasky, Carroll started Girl Skateboards in 1993 with fellow Plan B rider Rick Howard. Carroll explained in 2013 that, at the time, Plan B was continually "retiring" team members and he experienced a decrease in stress in regard to his future following the decision to launch Girl.

Following his recruitment to the Vans skate shoe team in 1994, Carroll was often seen in his early team ads skating in Half Cabs. In 1996, Carroll released a signature model, a technically more advanced shoe based on the Half Cab with a modern internal looped lacing system, but left the company in 1997 and moved to DC Shoes. In 1998, DC Shoes released a Mike Carroll signature model shoe called the "Cosmo". Not long afterwards, Carroll left DC Shoes in 1999 along with Girl Skateboards team member and founder Rick Howard and they started the shoe company, Lakai.

Carroll is globally known for his skating at the Embarcadero plaza (also known as Justin Herman Plaza), in San Francisco, U.S. As of 2012, the area continues to be a popular location for skateboarders. Carroll has also been attributed to the discovery of another famous San Francisco skateboard landmark 3rd and Army.

=== Sponsors ===
As of July 2014, Carroll is sponsored by FTC, Fourstar Clothing, Girl, Lakai Limited Footwear, Diamond Supply Co., Royal Truck Company, Glassy Sunhaters, Grizzly Griptape, and Bones Bearings.

== Awards and honors ==
Carroll won Thrasher magazine's Skater of the Year award in 1994.

In December 2011, Carroll was selected as one of "The 30 Most Influential Skaters Of All Time" by Transworld Skateboarding. Carroll was number 16 in the list, following Jamie Thomas and preceding Guy Mariano. In the corresponding interview with Skin Phillips, uploaded in September 2012, Carroll listed Jason Lee and Julian Stranger as the two skateboarders who have been the most influential in his life.

In 2023, Carroll was inducted into the Skateboarding Hall of Fame.

== Videography ==
- H-Street: Shackle Me Not (1988)
- H-Street: Hokus Pokus (1989)
- Plan B: Questionable (1992)
- Plan B: Virtual Reality (1993)
- Girl: Gold Fish (1993)
- Girl: Mouse (1996)
- Chocolate Skateboards: "The Chocolate Tour" (1999)
- Transworld: Modus Operandi (2000)
- Girl: Yeah Right (2003)
- Lakai: Fully Flared (2007)
- Girl: Pretty Sweet (2012)

== Video game appearances ==
Carroll is a playable character in the Electronic Arts video games; Skate, Skate It, Skate 2, and Skate 3.
