= Rodney Mullen vs. Daewon Song =

1997–2004 skateboarding film series

Rodney Mullen vs. Daewon Song is a skateboarding video series that features influential skateboarders Rodney Mullen and Daewon Song. Three video installments were released under the titles Round 1, Round 2, and Round 3 (the third "round" was incorporated into the debut video for the Almost skateboard company that was cofounded by Mullen and Song).

== History ==
=== Round 1 (1997) ===
The first video shows Mullen "competing" against Song—the two are close friends outside of the video series. The video also features combined parts from the World Industries, A-Team, and Blind teams (as they were in 1997 when the video was released). Song and Mullen both appear in their own parts that are combined with small sections that feature members of their respective brands' teams.

=== Round 2 (1999) ===
Compared to the first video, Round 2 was produced in a slightly different format. As with Round 1, the video features individual parts from Mullen and Song, and there are also combined parts from the World Industries, A-Team, and Blind teams—some World team members had, by this time, formed the Deca brand. However, there are also short advertisement-like sections throughout the video for the other brands that were being distributed by Dwindle Distribution at the time, making the video similar to an issue of a video magazine.

=== Round 3 (2004) ===
The unofficial third installment is a full length video from Almost Skateboards, and is considerably different from the original two official installments. Almost: Round Three not only includes Song and Mullen, but features full-length parts from the Almost team of the time: Chris Haslam, Cooper Wilt, Greg Lutzka, Ryan Sheckler, and "William Patrick", who was really Tyrone Olson in a costume.

== See also ==
- Flip tricks
- Marc Johnson
- Ronnie Creager
