= Rick McCrank =

Canadian skateboarder

Personal information
- Nicknames: Crankers; McKrills
- Born: Richard McCrank; January 23, 1976 (age 50) Peterborough, Ontario, Canada
- Occupations: Professional skateboarder; business owner; television presenter
- Height: 5 ft 10 in (178 cm)
- Spouse: Lee Dolan (m. 2015)
- Website: www.antisocialshopworldwide.com

Sport
- Country: Canada
- Sport: Skateboarding
- Position: Regular

Richard McCrank (born January 23, 1976) is a Canadian professional skateboarder and skate shop owner.

== Early life ==
McCrank was born in Peterborough, Ontario, and grew up in Ottawa, Ontario.

== Professional skateboarding ==
McCrank's first deck sponsor was Cherry Bombs, a small Canadian brand. McCrank was discovered by professional skateboarder Colin McKay and invited to join Plan B Skateboards. After Plan B, McCrank briefly joined Birdhouse, appearing in the 1998 video The End. After Birdhouse, McCrank joined the Girl Distribution Company and is currently a team member of the Girl brand.

McCrank designed several signature skate shoe models for the éS brand, including the éS "Anti-Social" model. Following the announcement of the brand's hiatus, McCrank has been filmed wearing the Lakai brand. In 2019, McCrank announced he was leaving Lakai. In 2020, Rick was announced as a rider for the Vans skate team. McCrank is part owner of Momentum Wheels with ex-Bones Brigade pro Kevin Harris.

=== Contest history ===
McCrank competed in Street contests throughout his career. He was awarded one of the highest ever scores in a street skateboarding competition, scoring a 99.67 at ESPN's 2000 grand prix. In the Summer of 2001, McCrank got 1st place in the X-Games Skateboard Street Best Trick contest. Also in 2001, McCrank placed 2nd at the Gravity Games, hosted in Providence, Rhode Island. He won the Globe World Cup at Melbourne in 2002 and in 2003, McCrank placed 2nd at the 2003 Gravity Games behind Ryan Sheckler. In 2003, McCrank placed 2nd at the Slam City Jam. In 2004, he came second to Ronnie Creager at the Globe World Cup.

=== Awards ===
McCrank was voted "Best Street Skater" by Transworld SKATEboarding magazine in 2001.

== Other ventures ==
McCrank co-founded the Anti-Social Skateshop in Vancouver. He co-owns the Momentum brand, a skateboard wheel company.

McCrank has acted in the films Harvey Spannos (2006) and Machotaildrop (2009). He hosted the television series Abandoned, which premiered on the Viceland network in 2016. His most recent television project is Post Radical, which aired in 2018.

In 2019, McCrank was part of a group of skateboard industry veterans who spoke at the Pushing Boarders conference in Malmö, Sweden.

== Videography ==
- Sheep: Life of Leisure (1996)
- Church of Skatan: Santa Barbara (1996)
- Plan B: The Revolution (1997)
- Birdhouse: The End (1998)
- Transworld: The Reason (1999)
- 411VM: Brazilian Vacation (1999)
- The XYZ Video (1999)
- Powell: Bones Bearings Class of 2000 (2000)
- éS: éSpecial
- Dwindle: Rodney Mullen vs Daewon Song Round 2 (1999)
- éS: Menikmati (2002)
- Girl: Harsh Euro Barge (2002)
- Girl: Yeah Right! (2003)
- Stereo: Way Out East (2004)
- FuelTV: Riding the Long White Cloud (2009)
- Girl/Chocolate: Pretty Sweet (2012)
- Viceland TV: Abandoned – Skateboarder Rick McCrank explores abandoned places with the people who love them long after the lights have gone out (2016)
- Viceland TV: Post Radical - Rick McCrank takes viewers on an exploration of skateboarding's varied subcultures.
- Girl Skateboards "Doll" (2018)
