= Tensor Trucks =

American skateboarding truck company

Tensor Trucks logo

Tensor Trucks is an American skateboarding truck company founded and designed by professional skateboarder, Rodney Mullen, in 2000. Tensor's parent company is Dwindle Distribution. The brand offers trucks in three different heights (lo, mid, hi) that are tailored for different wheel diameters—the hi is designed for 58mm wheels and smaller; the mid for 54mm or smaller; and the lo for 52mm and smaller. Mullen holds US patent no. 6,443,471B1 for design features implemented in Tensors. Tensor's trucks are manufactured in China.

== History ==
Mullen explained the origin of the brand in a 2010 interview:

I didn’t feel it was legitimate to just build another truck like an Indy [Independent Truck Co.]. I thought, ‘How can I do it differently?’ The way I skate was flip tricks—setting up your feet and landing ... I wanted to build a truck that would help you do those kind of things better. I wanted to build a truck that doesn’t turn that well because that’s going to help me. If you want that other truck, it’s already there. I don’t feel I deserve a place by copying someone else. That is the value I’ve always got from skateboarding—to be part of something bigger.

== Key design features ==
=== Baseplate sliders ===
The most visible feature on a Tensor truck (not including the Response model) is the polymer baseplate slider. Trucks can wear out on the baseplates from nose and tail slides. The slider is replaceable and is touted to slide better than standard aluminum baseplates.

=== Interlocking bushings ===
Tensor bushings (or cushions) use a patented design that features a flange on the bottom bushing that connects to the top bushing to stabilize the truck.

=== Baseplate nibs ===
Tensor trucks feature four fangs on each baseplate, designed to dig into the board to prevent the truck from shifting when mounting hardware loosens.

=== Buttonhead kingpin ===
Tensor implemented a grade-8 buttonhead kingpin with machined splines on it to prevent it from spinning in the baseplate. The buttonhead is lighter than the hex kingpin, which was the then-industry standard. Independent, Thunder, Venture, Krux, Fury, and Destructo have since implemented buttonhead kingpins.

== Response ==
Tensor released a new truck called the "Response" in March 2007. It was an all-metal design, forgoing the plastic baseplate sliders of the original design, and was promoted as "the lightest truck". In 2008 Tensor released their lightest design yet using magnesium and touted to be 25% lighter than the industry average truck.

== Bearings ==
Tensor collaborated with Oust Bearings to produce a co-branded Oust/Tensor line of skateboard bearings. The two brands also developed experimental Tensor trucks that consisted of enhanced parts.

== Hollow components ==
Tensor trucks also have uniquely designed hardware. The axle and the kingpin bolt are both hollow in design to eliminate material weight, thus increasing overall lightness.

== Team ==
As of August 2014, the team roster for Tensor Trucks consists of:

- Ben Fisher
- Felipe Ortiz
- Cordell Studley
- Joey Brezinski
- Rodney Mullen
- Zered Bassett
- Manny Santiago
- Daewon Song
- Andrew Brophy
- TJ Rogers

Notable ex-team members include Chris Cole, Chris Haslam, Kanten Russell, Ronnie Creager, Enrique Lorenzo, founder, Gailea Momolu, Dave Mayhew, Ryan Sheckler, and Jake Duncombe.
