= Round 3 (disambiguation) =

Round 3 may refer to:

- Round 3, mini album by Kim Hyun-joong
- #ROUND3, Elise Estrada album
- Round 3 wind farm, a third generation of wind farm developments in the UK
- Fight Night Round 3, computer boxing game
- Almost: Round Three, a third skateboard video of the Rodney Mullen vs. Daewon Song series
