= Almost: Round Three =

- Directed by: Matt Hill
- Produced by: Brett J. Hardy; Joe Guglielmino
- Starring: Rodney Mullen; Daewon Song; Chris Haslam; Cooper Wilt; Ryan Sheckler; Tyrone Olson; Chris Casey; Greg Lutzka
- Edited by: Jean-Jacques Briquet
- Release date: November 10, 2004
- Running time: 34 minutes
- Country: United States

Almost: Round Three is a skateboarding video that was released in DVD format in 2004. The video is the inaugural full-length production of the Almost Skateboards company, which was cofounded by professional skateboarders Rodney Mullen and Daewon Song in the previous year.

== Overview ==
The video was produced as the third part of the Rodney Mullen vs. Daewon Song series, the first two of which are included on this DVD as hidden extras. Round Three also features individual parts by the Almost team of the time: Chris Haslam, Cooper Wilt, Ryan Sheckler, William Patrick (played by Tyrone Olson and Chris Casey), and Greg Lutzka. The video has also featured in various selections of 'best skate videos' over time.

== Soundtrack ==
- Opening - Journey - Any Way You Want It
- Chris Haslam - The Cardigans - My Favourite Game
- Cooper Wilt - Franz Ferdinand - Come On Home
- Ryan Sheckler - The Cure - Why Can't I Be You?
- William Patrick - The Mr. Move - Ghetto Whomper
- Greg Lutzka - The Jimi Hendrix Experience - All Along the Watchtower
- Rodney Mullen - The Clash - Train in Vain and Massive Attack - Teardrop
- Daewon Song - The Killers - All These Things That I've Done

== See also ==
- Dwindle Distribution
