= Greathouse (surname) =

Greathouse is an English surname. Notable people with the surname include:

- Clarence Ridgley Greathouse (1846–1899), American lawyer, journalist and diplomat
- Daniel Greathouse (c.1752 – 1775), American pioneer
- Ed Greathouse (1899–1954), American boxer
- Jaden Greathouse (born 2004), American football player
- Shiloh Greathouse, American skateboarder
- William M. Greathouse (1919–2011), American Nazarene minister and theologian
