= Ronnie Creager =

American skateboarder

- Born: Ronnie Aaron Creager; January 14, 1974 (age 52)
- Occupations: Professional skateboarder, company owner

Ronnie Aaron Creager (born January 14, 1974) is a "goofy-footed" American professional skateboarder from Orange, California.

== Early life ==
As Creager has explained in a 2011 interview, he commenced skateboarding at the age of three:

My neighbor Mike Skinner introduced skateboarding to me around the age of three. He basically brainwashed me as a small child by pushing me around on his board when my mind was just developing. My first real board was a Sure-Grip that belonged to my sister, but the one I remember the most from early on was a Ken Park. I had all the plastic accessories on it—plus Rip Grip and cut-up griptape in all different colors. But back then, the only things that mattered to me were the wheels. If I could roll, I was in business.

== Professional skateboarding ==
Creager specializes in technical street skating and for more than twenty years his professional skateboard footage has frequently featured ledge structures (Creager produced a ledge skateboarding instructional video segment for TransWorld SKATEboarding magazine in 2011).

Creager was a senior member of the Blind Skateboards team and stated that it felt unstable when he first joined the company:

It was scary. At one point, I was the only rider on the team. I was worried. I had lost a sponsor before and knew how it felt, but this time was different: it wasn’t about getting kicked off—it was that the company might fall apart.

In 2011, Creager revealed that he had been with the company for almost twenty years, stating that his entire skateboarding career has been devoted to the brand: "I’ve dedicated my whole skate career to Blind and stood behind the company in times of both good and bad but I’m confident that Blind will take care of me."

Creager was sponsored by Tensor, the skateboard truck brand founded by skateboard pioneer Rodney Mullen—Creager released signature truck models with the brand. As of September 2013, Creager is a team rider for the Theeve truck brand.

Since 2011, Creager has become increasingly involved with The Berrics website that is owned by professional skateboarders Steve Berra and Eric Koston. In addition to being sponsored by the Berrics brand, Creager is often featured in the website's video segments and on January 14, 2013, the website released a birthday video that featured Creager skating in the Berrics training facility.

The Blind company published a media release on March 13, 2014 stating that Creager had parted ways with the company. Creager's future plan for a board sponsor was not included as part of the announcement. Creager is described as "a one of a kind inspiration to all of us at Blind, the team, everyone at Dwindle and skaters worldwide," with "uncanny board control and effortless style," whose "parts are timeless and serve as inspiration for skaters of all ages from every corner of the globe." Speculation arose on the internet about whether Creager will join the Almost Skateboards team, as a photo of an Almost board is posted on Creager's Facebook page on March 6, 2014.

=== Sponsors ===
As of September 2013, Creager is sponsored by Es Footwear, Bones Wheels, GoPro, High School Dropout™, Etcetera Project, The Skateboard Club, Mob Grip and Keen Ramps.

== Company owner ==
Creager launched a skateboard accessories brand in 2011, entitled "Etcetera". According to the brand's publicity, the company "is committed to creating and innovating new products for skateboarding." As of September 2012, Etcetera produces the following accessories for the retail market: "Primo Insoles", "Ankle Stabiliser", "Lace Belt", and the "Wall Ride" skateboard deck-storage device. Creager explained the idea behind the brand in a 2011 interview:

It’s an accessories line designed to help keep skaters on their boards instead of nursing an injury. Ankle braces you can skate in, fully padded insoles and other products that I need to keep under wraps for a just little longer. It’s been in the works for a long time now. I just think it’s crazy that some of these ideas skaters come up with never get made, so that’s why we exist.

Etcetera also sponsors a team that consists of Lizard King, Jordan Hoffart, Manny Santiago, Ronnie Creager, Morgan Smith, Marc Johnson, and Chase Gabor (Johnson was added to the team in September 2012). Creager starred in a commercial for Etcetera, filmed at and near his home in California, US, and the production was published on the Internet in February 2012.

== Accolades ==
In July 2013, professional skateboarder Paul Rodriguez included Creager in his "top ten" list of favorite professional skateboarders. In addition to recommending Creager's 1996 Trilogy video part, Rodriguez explained the selection on his personal website:

I love that dude man. That guy, again.. style, creativity, technical abilities, precision. I would always be captivated by his skateboarding every time I would see anything from him. It seemed so easy and graceful when you would see him skate.

== Personal life ==
Creager currently resides in California, U.S., near Orange County.

== Video parts ==
- Foundation: Cocktails (1992)
- Foundation: Super Conductor Super Collider (1993)
- Foundation: Barbarians At The Gate (1994)
- 411VM - Issue 4 (1994)
- World Industries: 20 Shot Sequence (1995)
- World Industries/Blind/101: Trilogy (1996)
  - Rodney Mullen vs Daewon Song (1997)
- Pig: All Systems Go! (1998)
- Rodney Mullen vs Daewon Song: Round 2 (1999)
- 411VM - Issue 36 (1999)
- eS Footwear Menikmati (2000)
- TSA: Life In The Fast Lane (2001)
- 411VM - Best Of 411, Volume 7 (2001)
- 411VM - Vancouver (2002)
- Globe: World Cup Skateboarding (2005)
- Blind's What If? (2005)
- Etnies: Restless (2006)
- Globe: The Global Assault (2006)
- Thrasher: King Of The Road (2007)
- The Blind Video (2009)
- Blind: Blind Sunday Fundays (2010)
- Berrics "Battle Commander"

== See also ==
- Daewon Song
- Dwindle Distribution
- Flip tricks
