= Rodney Mullen =

American skateboarder (born 1966)

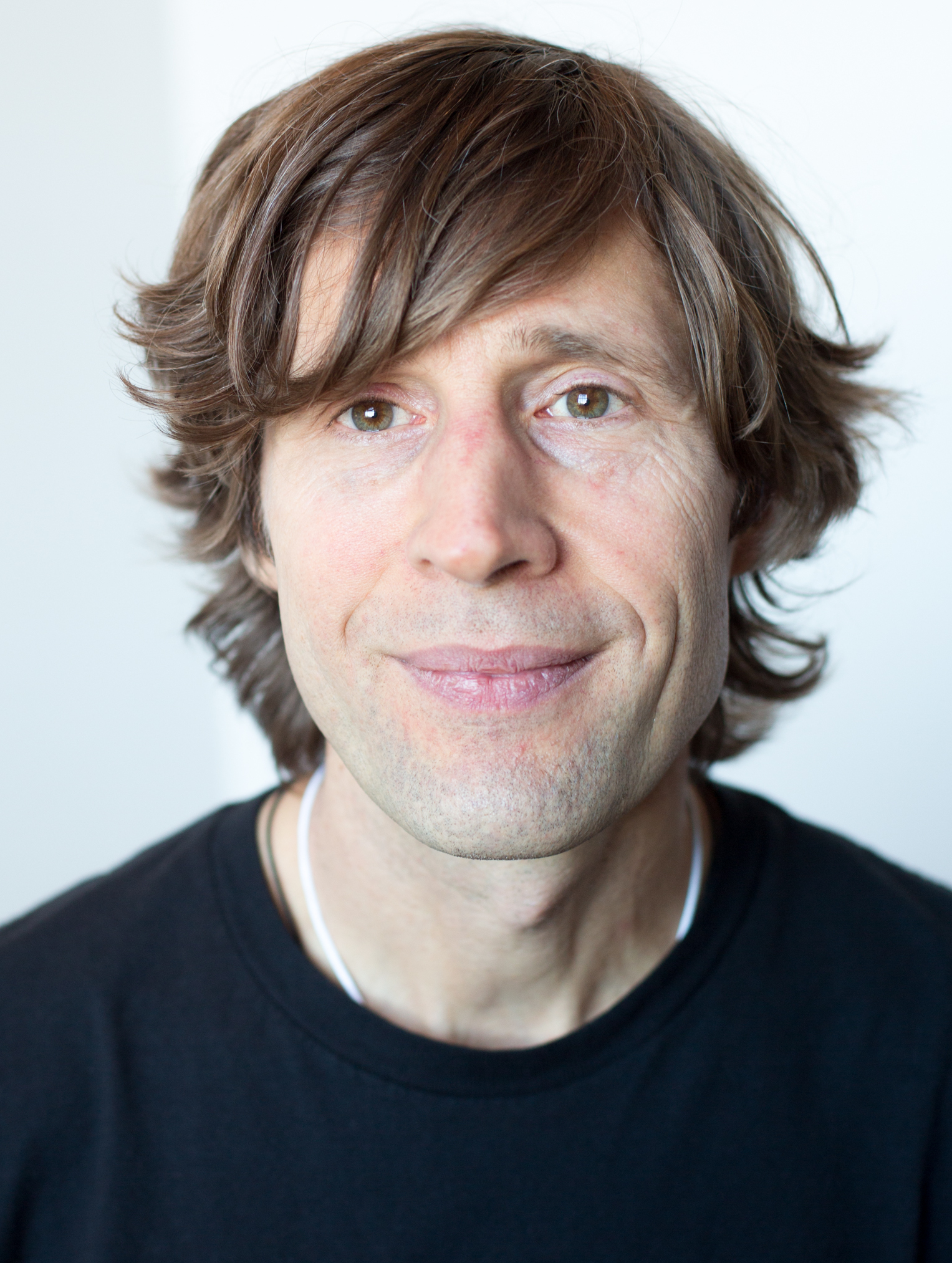
- Mullen in 2013

Personal information
- Born: John Rodney Mullen; August 17, 1966 (age 60) Gainesville, Florida, U.S.
- Occupation: Skateboarder
- Years active: 1978–present
- Website: rodneymullen.com

Sport
- Country: United States
- Sport: Skateboarding
- Turned pro: 1980

John Rodney Mullen (born August 17, 1966) is an American professional skateboarder who practices freestyle skateboarding and street skateboarding. He is considered one of the most influential skateboarders of all time. Mullen is credited for inventing numerous tricks, including the flatground ollie, kickflip, heelflip, impossible, and 360-kickflip. As a result, he has been called the "godfather of modern street skating".

Rodney Mullen won his first world freestyle skateboard championship at the age of 14; over the following decade, he won 34 out of 35 freestyle contests, thus establishing the most successful competitive run in the history of the sport. Over the following years, he transitioned from freestyle to street skateboarding, adapting his accumulated freestyle skills to street and inventing or expanding upon additional tricks in the process, such as primo slides, dark slides, and Casper slides.

Mullen has appeared in over 20 skateboarding videos and has co-authored an autobiography, entitled The Mutt: How to Skateboard and Not Kill Yourself, with writer Sean Mortimer.

== Early life ==
Mullen was born and raised in Gainesville, Florida. His father was a dentist and property developer while his mother was a child prodigy and accomplished pianist who graduated high school at the age of 14. He and his family lived on a farm. As a child, Mullen slept in boots designed to correct a severe pigeon-toe condition. Despite Mullen's condition, "He had an incredible dexterity with his feet," said Phil Chiocchio, former owner of the Florida skatepark, Sensation Basin.

Mullen began skateboarding at the age of ten, on New Year's Day of 1977, after a neighborhood friend introduced him to a skateboard. He promised his strict father that he would cease skateboarding the first time he became seriously injured:

My dad wouldn't let me have a skateboard. He thought I'd get hurt and never get good, and the culture was bums, and I'd turn into one. He was a dentist, but before that he was military, and there were times you'd call him, 'Sir.' New Year's Day he had a drink and felt better, and the skate shop was open. I learned to skate in our garage. We lived in the country in Florida, it was sort of farmish, and there was no cement anywhere else. Vert skating was the kind of skating that was done in pools, where you could get airborne and be weightless. The other style, which is what I did, was called freestyle, which was tricks you could do on flat ground.

Mullen practiced in the garage of the family home while wearing a comprehensive protective pads setup, a precaution that was part of the deal with his father. He also spent time with his sister's surfer friends who skated on weekdays. He became obsessed with the skateboard and practiced for many hours on a daily basis.

Mullen graduated from P. K. Yonge Developmental Research School where he had a 4.0 GPA and studied biomedical engineering at the University of Florida, where he majored in mathematics, although he later dropped out due to his daily schedule. Although talented, he was pathologically shy and suffered from anxiety as well as anorexia as a teenager; while on tour, he ran away from the Bones Brigade van during a rest stop in Maryland.

== Professional skateboarding ==
In 1978, even though he had only owned a skateboard for just over a year, Mullen placed fifth in the Boy's Freestyle category at the US Open Championships at Kona Skatepark in Jacksonville, Florida. Skateboard manufacturer Bruce Walker saw his performance and sponsored Mullen through Walker Skateboards from 1978 to 1980. Mullen's biggest influence in skateboarding at the time was a Walker professional skateboarder, Jim McCall, who was coached in his early years by Walker (Walker also coached a young Kelly Slater). Mullen was also influenced in a positive manner by professional skateboarders from Florida including Ed Womble, George McClellan, Clyde Rodgers, Tim Scroggs, and Kelly Lynn.

In later years, Mullen was coached by Barry Zaritsky (also known as "SIO Barry"), who owned a company called SiO Safety Shorts. When his family moved to a farm in a remote part of Florida, Mullen began perfecting his flat ground techniques in the family garage; he has said that the isolation and lack of terrain naturally guided him towards freestyle skateboarding. Mullen cites July 1979–August 1980 as his "most creative time", a time when he was predominantly a loner who counted the cows of the family farm as his best friends. Mullen then proceeded to win thirty successive amateur competitions in the late 1970s, mostly in his home state of Florida, culminating in a win at the Oceanside Nationals in June 1979.

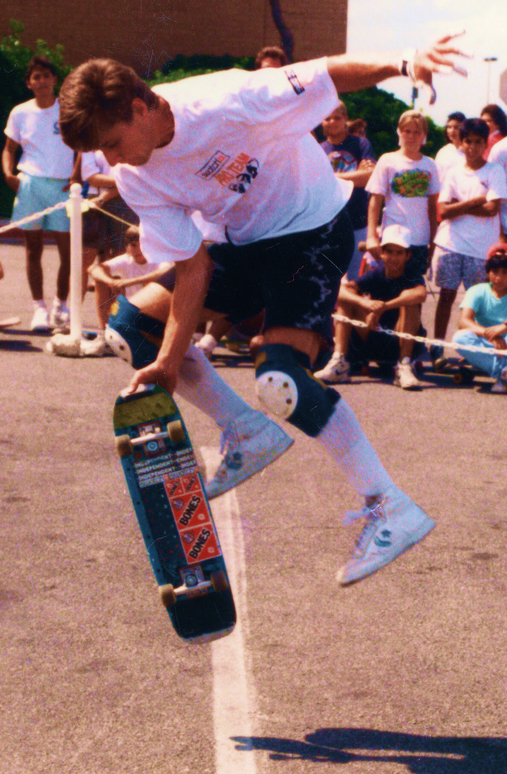
Rodney Mullen in 1988. "Innovation rarely comes by revolution; it develops by continual and gradual evolution." —Mullen

In 1980, the 14-year-old Mullen entered the Oasis Pro competition, defeating the world champion, Steve Rocco. At Oasis Skatepark Mullen also spotted a 12-year-old skater who "introduced himself as Tony Hawk." Recalled Mullen, "Before Tony was sponsored, before anybody knew anything about him, he made an impression on me," and the two would go on to become good friends.

=== Bones Brigade ===
Shortly thereafter, Mullen turned professional as a member of the renowned Bones Brigade team (the team was sponsored by the skateboard company Powell Peralta). Mullen was recommended to the Bones Brigade by skateboarder Tim Scroggs, who was a member of the team and a fellow Floridian. Scroggs specifically recommended Mullen to company co-founder Stacy Peralta, whom Mullen highly admired. Mullen competed voraciously throughout the 1980s, often frustrating competitors and judges with his consistency and progressive ability.

Like most skaters at the time, Mullen skated a mix of styles, including some vert, before skateboarding became more clearly delineated, as skaters who were more freestyle-oriented gravitated toward street and those who had skated more transition, bowls, and pools went into vert.

Mullen enrolled in the chemical engineering program at the University of Florida, leaving during his senior year prior to completing his degree in order to take over management of World Industries with fellow Bones Brigade team member and company co-founder Steve Rocco.

=== Invention of the flatground ollie ===
Among his most significant contributions to the evolution of modern skateboarding, Rodney Mullen adapted the ollie, first pioneered by Alan Gelfand on vert (where Gelfand would scoop off the back trucks to obtain more air off the wall, but without popping the tail of the skateboard in the process), to flat ground. This ability to pop the board off of the ground and drag it upward into the air, gaining significant altitude and air time, allowed ollieing onto rails and obstacles and opened the door to more complex flip tricks and other flat ground tricks. The invention of this trick alone, even apart from the numerous other tricks that he has invented and his design work, has ranked Mullen as one of the most important skateboarders of all time. In response to the praise that he has received for the flat ground ollie, Mullen stated in August 2012:

The origins of ollies—a guy named Alan Gelfand did it on vert...I had for a long time done a really simple movement, which was—it was just a transfer trick...and there are a ton of tricks where I needed to get to this side [demonstrates going from standing regular on his board to standing on the nose]. It's a transfer trick—I'd been doing that since the late seventies, so that I could, in turn, do things like this [demonstrates going from standing on the nose to a nose-stand and then landing back on his skateboard]. When I saw him [Gelfand] do it on the wall, I immediately—I'm thinking, the mechanics of it: how do you get your board off the ground—how would you get your board off the ground like he did off the wall, 'cause I'm stuck on flat ground, not weightless...[T]he first ones I did took about, I don't know, five, ten minutes...I realized, that's just the same motion I've been doing for years—it's a see-saw motion; that's how ollies work...it's just a punch and a little hop; and the real key to it was dragging your foot and leveling it out, which brings the board up...In a back-handed way, people credit me within the documentary, Stacy [Peralta]'s Bones Brigade documentary, credit me with the importance of the ollie that gave the foundation for street skating, which is just skateboarding today, all that; and to me it was like, "Yeah, but, it's not a big deal." Took me ten minutes, fifteen, half an hour, an hour; and the next thing you know, you're getting 'em this high, and that's what laid the foundation for everything else. So, in a sense, the biggest innovation for street skating, which is what they credit me for—it's not a big deal!

Throughout the 1980s, Mullen invented many of skating's flip tricks, including the kickflip, the heelflip, the 360-flip, among others. These freestyle tricks were adapted to street skating by skaters such as Mark Gonzales and Natas Kaupas. Mullen's tricks are now considered essential building blocks of both modern street skateboarding and vert skateboarding.

=== World Industries ===
In early 1989, Mullen left the Bones Brigade to join World Industries as a principal investor with longtime friend and former rival, Steve Rocco, in the formation of the very first skateboarder-owned company—professional skateboarder, Mike Vallely, later joined the company for a brief period of time. Mullen and Rocco had embarked on a very risky venture, as Powell Peralta was an established company and Rocco's upstart company had been struggling at the time. World Industries would later develop into the distribution company, Dwindle Distribution, which is the world's largest skateboard manufacturer in the 21st century.

=== Transition to street and Plan B ===
As the popularity of freestyle skateboarding declined, Mullen was urged to transform his style to join the street skating trend that was becoming increasingly popular at that time; however, Mullen was very reluctant due to a fear of compromising his integrity, whereby the foundation of his skateboarding would be "sold out". Such pressure is alluded to in the World Industries video, Rubbish Heap, in which Mullen's sequence ends with a team member, Jeremy Klein, deliberately breaking his freestyle skateboard (which is also the first recorded focus of a skateboard) and then handing him a note from Rocco, accompanied by a street skateboard deck, in which the end of freestyle is declared.

In 1991, Mullen joined the high-profile skateboarding team, Plan B Skateboards. Mike Ternasky, the owner of Plan B, influenced Mullen to transition from freestyle to street skating, and showcased his skills in the 1992 Plan B video, Questionable. His segment begins with traditional freestyle tricks executed on flat ground, but quickly transitions into Mullen skateboarding across public terrain to shift into street skating tricks and lines. Mullen's video part signified a major transformation in relation to both his career and his skateboarding. Ternasky filmed Mullen as he sequenced tricks and mixed flip tricks with grinds and boardslides, while he also negotiated obstacles. Mullen also introduced two newly invented tricks in Questionable, the kickflip underflip and the Casper slide.

Mullen's Questionable performance might have marked the beginning of a new era in street skateboarding. His reluctant transition from freestyle to street skateboarding was a symbol that legitimized the technical direction street skating had taken over the previous few years. Mullen focused on the progression of this transition in subsequent Plan B videos, including 1993's Virtual Reality, in which Mullen showcases the newly mastered trick, the darkslide. Mullen's participation in Plan B dissolved after Ternasky was killed in a car crash on May 17, 1994. Mullen later explained, "He was such a great person. He would lift you so high and that is why Plan B was what it was. And it was clear once Mike was gone that it was never the same."

=== A-Team and Enjoi ===
In 1997, Mullen started a company, the A-Team—along with Marc Johnson, Gershon Mosley, Dave Mayhew, and Chet Thomas—with the intention of forming a "super team". When A-Team folded in 2000, Mullen made the transition from company founder to company rider for Enjoi Skateboards. Former Maple rider, Marc Johnson, founded Enjoi Skateboards and also recruited riders Chris Cole and Bobby Puleo, with Jerry Hsu for the team.

=== Stance erasure ===
As a result of injuries accrued over many years riding in a fixed regular stance, from 2007 onward Mullen made a conscious effort to "erase" his riding stance, re-learning tricks (and in many cases learning new tricks he was unable to do previously riding regular) goofy and endeavoring to re-learn riding a skateboard neutrally in the absence of any preferential "natural stance". In an interview with Tony Hawk, Mullen explained that he had developed problems in his right hip joint, with scar tissue building up in his joint over years as a result of habitually hyper-extending his leg (e.g., doing the splits, a danger inherent in practicing riskier tricks such as darkslides) while skating. Mullen stated that through extensive stretching and the use of blunt objects he was able to break up the scar tissue in order to restore his range of motion.

Mullen further explained in an interview at Germany's Bright tradeshow in 2011:

For me, it was a grinding to a halt, until I could barely walk really... I took about a couple of years, a year-and-a-half of breaking myself apart; pretty medievally. And as I did so, I realized that that was helping me unravel my stance; and so now, I've just been investigating, or pushing myself to try to, to, take apart my stance so that I no longer have one. And so it's not just doing everything switch, because everybody does whatever switch. It's to have no stance at a physical level. And so even what you did in your regular, native stance, it feels...new.

=== 2014–present ===
The Almost company celebrated its 10th anniversary with an event at the Berrics indoor skate complex in early March 2014, and Mullen attended the venue for the first time. As part of the celebration, Mullen completed an interview with the Berrics that is titled "A Beautiful Mind," in which Mullen explained his current relationship with skateboarding: "Because we all have that fear of judgment...yeah, that's true. I'm like that—I'm afraid of being judged. I don't necessarily want to be seen in public sucking, getting older; but, what I keep inside, that joy of feeling what I do, rolling around, playing around—that's something I'm going to do as long as I can. That's who I am...who I am."

The first video footage of Mullen skateboarding in nine years was published on Tony Hawk's RIDE YouTube channel in July 2014. Mullen appears in the video skateboarding at musician Ben Harper's residence and Harper also performs a single trick at the video's conclusion. The part was filmed by Ben Fordham of the Gracias L.A. brand, which released the Gracias Skateboarding Volumen Uno video in 2014 that also features Mullen.

Together with other members of the Almost team, Mullen appeared in a June 2015 photo retrospective of the Almost brand that was shot and curated by skateboard photographer Seu Trinh. Mullen was part of the Globe brand's "EUTrippin'" 2015 European tour, alongside other team members including Mark Appleyard and Haslam.

== Other ventures ==
=== Rodney vs. Daewon ===
Around 1997, Mullen also initiated discussions with friend and fellow professional skateboarder, Daewon Song, to plan the video Rodney vs. Daewon, released in 1997, which featured the two skaters "competing" with their respective video parts. The concept developed into a series and, as of December 2012, three "rounds" have been produced.

=== Tensor ===
Around 2000, Mullen engaged in the development of his own skateboard truck design, a concept that would later become the foundation for the company Tensor. In 2000, Mullen filed for a United States Patent in support of his innovative work in the area and submitted the following abstract to the U.S. Patent and Trademark Office:

A skateboard having one or more truck assemblies configured to eliminate undesired ride characteristics such as hanger-jiggle and wheel bite, without sacrificing the skateboard's steering responsiveness. Each truck assembly includes an axle assembly with a ring-shaped hanger that is confined on a kingpin using a pair of bushings, at least one of which includes an annular flange that projects into an annular gap defined between the hanger and the kingpin. This prevents the hanger from moving laterally relative to the kingpin and thereby eliminates undesired ride characteristics such as hanger-jiggle and wheel bite. In a separate feature of the invention, the skateboard truck assembly further incorporates a low-friction slider plate that enhances the rider's performance of certain maneuvers and at the same time protects other components of the truck assembly from undue wear.

A subsequent advertisement was released, entitled "The Patented Tensor Design." Tensor recruited team riders such as Daewon Song, Chris Cole, Chris Haslam, Salman Agah, Ryan Sheckler, Kanten Russell, and Gailea Momolu. As of December 2012, the Tensor team consists of Mullen, along with Daewon Song, Ronnie Creager, Enrique Lorenzo, Manny Santiago, Zered Bassett, Felipe Ortiz, and Joey Brezinski.

=== Almost and Dwindle Distribution ===
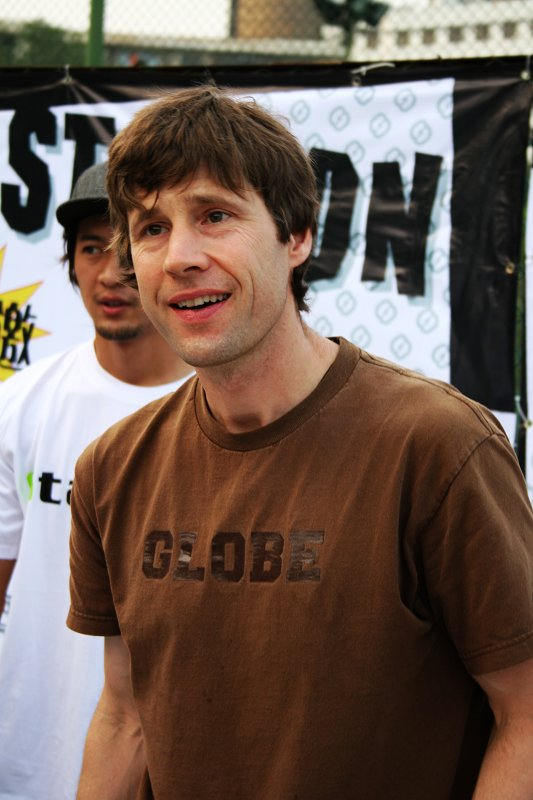
"The biggest obstacle to creativity is breaking through the barrier of disbelief." —Rodney Mullen, 2013

Mullen subsequently left Enjoi to co-found Almost Skateboards with Daewon Song, who had been unable to find success with the two preceding deck companies that he had founded, Deca and Artafact. Mullen and Song proceeded to recruit Cooper Wilt (a former Artafact rider), Chris Haslam (a former Deca and Artafact rider), Greg Lutzka, and Ryan Scheckler to form the initial basis of the company.

After years of success and controversy, Steve Rocco decided to sell World Industries. In 2002, World Industries, under the holding name "Kubic Marketing," was sold to Globe International for US$46 million. Its owner Rocco and Mullen, a principal investor, both became instant multimillionaires. Kubic's management remained intact, and Mullen began working for Globe under the Dwindle Distribution brand.

As of December 2012, Mullen remains the co-owner and a team rider for the Almost brand; his role at Almost also includes research and development on new designs and technologies, including Impact Support, Double Impact, and Uber Light. The Uber Light design was a collaborative effort between Mullen and the CL Composites company, utilizing a design that consists of "a deck inside a deck", whereby, "The internal carbon fiber foam deck is ultra-light and nearly as stiff as metal. It acts like rebar, or a skeleton embodied by a standard 7-ply layup. It also vastly improved the lateral rigidity. The deck wears, slides, and looks like a normal 7-ply, but it's lighter and has a supernatural pop that lasts far longer than any normal deck."

Mullen also contributes to the design of experimental and composite deck constructions for Dwindle's other brands, such as Blind and Darkstar.

=== Video game appearances ===
Mullen's popularity grew in 2000 when he made his first appearance in the Tony Hawk's video game series. Mullen has since appeared in various titles of the Tony Hawk's Pro Skater series including:

- Tony Hawk's Pro Skater 2
- Tony Hawk's Pro Skater 3
- Tony Hawk's Pro Skater 4
- Tony Hawk's Underground
- Tony Hawk's Underground 2
- Tony Hawk's American Wasteland
- Tony Hawk's Project 8
- Tony Hawk's Proving Ground
- Tony Hawk: Ride
- Tony Hawk's Pro Skater HD
- Tony Hawk's Pro Skater 1 + 2
- Tony Hawk's Pro Skater 3 + 4

In 2019, he also voiced and performed motion capture as Jace Skell in Tom Clancy's Ghost Recon Breakpoint, which marks his sole non-skating appearance in a video game to date. In 2022, he and his team released his first game called Rodney Mullen's Skatrix, an augmented reality mobile game for iOS and Android devices.

=== Books ===
In 2015, Mullen wrote the foreword to the Dwindle and Globe history book Unemployable: 30 Years of Hardcore, Skate and Street reflecting upon his twenty-year involvement with those companies. In 2003, Mullen wrote and released his autobiography, The Mutt: How to Skateboard and Not Kill Yourself.

=== Public speaking ===
Mullen has completed numerous public speaking engagements and has been invited to present on topics such as his personal life, skateboarding, innovation, creation, and the concept of community.

The Lemelson Center at MIT invited Mullen to visit the center, a part of the Smithsonian's National Museum of American History to discuss invention and innovation from within the context of American society. The Lemelson Center exchanged ideas and views with Mullen about skateboarding, in addition to the manner in which creativity and innovation can contribute to the development of an improved society.

Mullen was invited by the Sapling Foundation, as part of its TED (Technology, Entertainment and Design) public speaking series, to present at the University of Southern California (USC) in June 2012. Mullen's talk was entitled, "How Context Shapes Content", and featured his perspectives on the manner in which the street-based context of skateboarding influences his practice, in addition to his view of the skateboarding community, whereby he compared the community to the open source and hacking movements. Mullen also spoke about resilience and creativity in a talk entitled "Getting Back Up" at the Pop!Tech "Sparks of Brilliance" event in October 2013.

In the first half of 2014, Mullen was invited by the O'Reilly Media technology company to present at its "Strata" and "Velocity" conferences, both of which were held in Santa Clara, California. Mullen's Strata presentation in February 2014 was titled "The Art of Good Practice" and consisted of an analysis of the nuanced way in which skateboarders practice their craft. Mullen then presented the "Build on a Bedrock of Failure" keynote in June 2014, in which he spoke of the way that "failure, pain, injury, recovery" are "embedded in the very notion of what it is to be a skateboarder".

=== Film ===
In December 2010, Mullen stated in an interview that he was preparing to film a part for the upcoming Almost video, although he did not appear in the 2012 video, 5-Incher. In the 2011 Bright tradeshow interview, Mullen stated, "At first, I just wanted to be able to be alright and walk okay and run. And then it was like, okay, skate again and now it's like 'Yeah, I can do something new!'. So, if I can do that, then I'll film. If I can't, then I'll keep my skating private." Both the skateboard media and in responses from Almost indicate that a full part from Mullen is scheduled for release following 5-Incher—Mullen was in attendance at the premiere of 5-Incher.

| Year | Title | Role | Notes |
|---|---|---|---|
| 2022 | Tony Hawk: Until the Wheels Fall Off | Self | HBO Documentary |
| 2018 | Physics Girl | Self | Television Series, Episode: Why this Skateboarding Trick Should be Impossible |
| 2017 | Dryvrs | skateboarder | Television Short: Episode Transfer of Power |
| 2017 | Rodney Mullen: Liminal | self | Documentary Short |
| 2015 | Motivation 2: The Chris Cole Story | self | Documentary |
| 2014 | Gracias Skateboarding Volumen Uno | self | Documentary |
| 2013 | Secret Life of Walter Mitty | stunt skater | Stunt double for Ben Stiller |
| 2012 | Waiting for Lightning | self | Documentary |
| 2012 | Bones Brigade an Autobiography | self | Documentary |
| 2010 | United by Fate 6 | self | Television Short |
| 2009 | United by Fate 5 | self | Television Short |
| 2008 | D.O.P.E. Death or Prison Eventually | self | Documentary |
| 2008 | United by Fate 4 | self | Television Short |
| 2008 | United by Fate 3 | self | Television Short |
| 2007 | United by Fate 2 | self | Television Short |
| 2007 | The Man Who Souled the World | self | Documentary |
| 2007 | United by Fate | self | Television Short |
| 2007 | John from Cincinnati | stunt skater | Episode 10 |
| 2005 | Cut Masters | guest (self) | TV show |
| 2005 | The Globe World Cup Skateboarding | narrator | TV Sports Special |
| 2004 | Tony Hawk's Secret Skatepark Tour | self | Documentary |
| 2004 | Almost: Almost: Round Three | self | Sports/Documentary Short |
| 2004 | Hangin With...Rodney Mullen | self | Documentary |
| 2004 | Transworld: Show Me the Way: Darkslide | self | Educational short |
| 2002 | Rodney Mullen: From the Ground up | self | Documentary |
| 2001 | Opinion: To Each His Own | self | Documentary |
| 1999 | Rodney Mullen vs. Daewon Song: Round 2 | self | Sports/Documentary Short |
| 1998 | Canvas: The Skateboarding Documentary | self | Documentary Short |
| 1997 | Rodney Mullen vs. Daewon Song | self | Sports/Documentary Short, issued by World Industries |
| 1995 | Second Hand Smoke | self | Documentary Short, issue by Plan B |
| 1993 | Virtual Reality | self | Documentary Short, issued by Plan B |
| 1992 | The Questionable Video | self | Documentary Short, issued by Plan B |
| 1989 | Gleaming the Cube | stunt skater | Stunt double for actor Christian Slater |
| 1989 | Rubbish Heap | self | Documentary Short, issued by World Industries |
| 1988 | Public Domain | self | Documentary |
| 1988 | Hot Splash | cameo as self | |
| 1985 | Future Primitive: The Bones Brigade | self | Documentary |
| 1984 | The Bones Brigade Video Show | self | Sports Short |
| 1982 | Skateboarding in the Eighties | self | Sports Short |

== Awards, accolades and influence ==
... freestyle is directly responsible for street skating. Rodney Mullen figured out how to ollie on the flat ground, and street skating wouldn't exist without the ollie. Every time you ollie, you should get on your knees and thank Rodney or take him out to eat if you see him skating around Los Angeles. The vert tricks done now, like a heelflip frontside Cab, wouldn't be possible without the heelflip, which thanks to Rodney comes from freestyle. The kickflip Indy? Rodney invented the kickflip. Ollie Impossible? Rodney. Rodney, Rodney, Rodney.

— Tony Hawk in his autobiography, Hawk – Occupation: Skateboarder

In 2002, Mullen won the Transworld Skateboarding Readers' Choice Award for Skater of the Year. In 2003, he was voted as the all-time greatest action sports athlete on the Extreme Sports Channel's Legends of the Extreme countdown. Transworld also included Mullen in its "30 Most Influential Skaters of All Time" list, released in December 2011 and he was elected into the third position, behind Tony Hawk (second) and Mark Gonzales (first).

In May 2013, Mullen was an inductee of the Skateboarding Hall of Fame and was present at the award ceremony that was held in Anaheim, California. Fellow professional skateboarder Steve Caballero and musician Ben Harper shared their experiences of Mullen prior to the presentation of the award, and Caballero credited Mullen with changing the "face" of skateboarding.

Professional skateboarder Paul Rodriguez identified Mullen as one of his "top ten" professional skateboarders in July 2013. Rodriguez explained his selection on his personal website: If you really wanna know Gonz [Mark Gonzales] and Rodney Mullen pretty much innovated damn near everything in street skateboarding. Rodney has always had the most mind-boggling most difficult tricks on top of having invented 50, 60, who knows how many tricks. Just about every modern day flat ground trick that we are doing today he invented.

Transworld has characterized him as possibly the most significant skater of all time, "Rodney Mullen built the house skateboarding lives in. After inventing the flatground ollie—in itself perhaps the most influential trick ever—he went on to unveil kickflips, backside flips, heelflips, 360 flips, double flips, impossibles, darkslides, and onward. Without Rodney, skateboarding would still be in the dark ages." Anthony Pappalardo of The RIDE Channel unequivocally stated, "From almost singled-handedly creating the entire vocabulary of flip-based tricks to revolutionizing the boards below our feet, Rodney Mullen is the biggest influence on modern skateboarding." In Transworld Skateboarding's "Skater's Favorite Skater" video series, both Tony Hawk and Daewon Song have cited Rodney Mullen as their favorite skater.

=== Trick invention ===
Mullen has been credited with inventing the following tricks (years included):

- The flatground Ollie
- Godzilla rail flip (1979)
- 540 shove-it (1979)
- 50/50 Saran wrap (1979)
- 50/50 Casper (1980)
- Helipop (1980)
- Gazelle flip (1981)
- No-handed 50/50 (1981)
- No-handed 50/50 kickflip
- Kick flip (1982)
- Heel flip (1982)
- Double heelflip
- Impossible (1982)
- Sidewinder (1983)
- 360 flip (1983)
- Switch 360 flip
- 360 pressure flip (1983)
- Casper 360 flip (1983)
- Half-cab kickflip (1983)
- 50/50 sidewinder (1983)
- One-footed ollie (1984)
- Backside flip (Backside 180 Kickflip) (1984)
- Ollie Nosebone (1986)
- Ollie finger flip (1986)
- Ollie Airwalk (1986)
- Frontside heel flip shove-it (1988)
- Helipop heel flip (1990)
- Kickflip underflip (1992)
- Half-cab kickflip underflip (1992)
- Casper slide (1992)
- Darkslide
- Half flip darkslide
- Handstand flips

== Reflections and perspectives ==
Mullen has publicly stated that an identification of his favorite skateboarders is an "endless" task. However, he has provided examples such as Chris Haslam, Bryan Herman, Paul Rodriguez, Antwuan Dixon, and Eric Koston.

In 2010 Mullen stated that "skating is one of the greatest blessings I could have," but also expressed concern about the popularity of skateboarding "big stuff" due to the physical toll that it takes on the bodies of professional skateboarders: "So I think it is unhealthy and uncool... I see great skaters and their ankles and knees are ruined." Mullen expanded upon his perspective of skateboarding during his Lemelson Foundation interview:

Skateboarding is as much, or more, an art of mode of expression than it is a sport. What skateboarding has given me is precisely that: a form of expression that drew me to it, and, in so doing, I was able to express and be who I wanted to be through it, in a sense. And establish myself within a community that were all essentially outsiders like myself. And by doing that, it gave me a place, a sense of belonging and, in the end, I was able to contribute, at a foundational level, a lot of the tricks that the entire community uses to express themselves. Which, again, is one of the beauties of skateboarding, is that we all draw from the same pool, and give back; so that others can do the same and keep expounding. Very much like an open source community.

During his attendance at the Biarritz international skateboard festival, Mullen was interviewed in relation to a used Mike Carroll skateboard deck from Carroll's time with the Plan B company. Mullen reflected on the personal influence of Plan B founder Mike Ternasky during the interview: "I miss Mike. And the day Jacob called me and goes, "Mike's dead."—I replayed that so many times...and how instrumental that was in driving me forward in a way that kind of honoring what he gave me: A second chance. And how real that is. And it goes back to Stacy [Peralta]'s film—it's not what you do; it's what makes you do what you do, is the thing that has to be protected and nurtured. As long as that's there, intact...you can do anything."

In a June 2014 interview at O'Reilly Media's Velocity conference, Mullen stated that he does not believe that skateboarding can be categorized as a "sport". Mullen further explained that the self-expressive element of skateboarding shows that it is an art form, while the community element of skateboarding—whereby sharing of ideas occurs—distinguishes it as a "lifestyle" or "philosophy". Mullen also shared his perspective on goals and failure during the interview: "You focus so much on your failures and your weaknesses, it has a...paralyzing effect, where you're dwelling on stuff. For example, having goals: sometimes I have lofty goals, my friends do—we all do, we all have goals. But, if you fix yourself to that goal, and you don't see anything else on the horizon—which is natural, 'cos that what it takes, we all have that in our personality...but, sometimes, if you attach that to a goal that is out of your reach, and you continue to fail, it will just grind you into nothing. And if you dwell on that, it can end you."

Mullen says, "Just the enjoyment of doing what you want to do, all the way through—that's the beauty of skateboarding, that so many people actually never find their whole lives. And that's what skateboarding's given me: I can't wake up—I can't wait to wake up in the morning to try something new; a lot of times I can't sleep because I can't wait to try something new... and how many people never really experience that feeling, often; and that's why I skate."

== Personal life ==
As of 2013, Mullen resides in California with his girlfriend, Lori Guidroz. He describes himself as "juvenile" who prefers to skate during the night and on his own. He says, "Any eyes on me—a late-night street sweeper, some dude texting in his parked car, the homeless guy talking to himself—make me feel uncomfortable when I skate. Everyone expects me to do certain things. It puts a ceiling on your progress. You're blocked by your pride. To get good, you have to throw your board around and fall."

Aside from skateboarding, Mullen has been interested in mathematics, physics, biomedical engineering (which he majored in college), computer coding and music. He has been invited to several TEDX conferences. It has been publicly revealed that Mullen owns a pair of high-powered audio speakers, each weighing around 200 pounds (91 kg), through which he plays a diverse range of music, including Sabaton and Beethoven: "Me and my neighbors, we have an understanding...and so I sit perfect, you know, triangle at the front. You sit there with the remote and you turn it up, just when it starts to hurt, and hit one more and then go like [presses his hands to his ears] that, and then you just feel it in your whole body for a while, as long as you can take it. And then you 'arrgh!', and then you turn it off you know and [hold his hand to his heart and breathes heavily], and then I go skate [laughs]. It's awesome, but only if I'm really usually, like, just sometimes when you really need it, you know?" He has also learned Linux and has described himself as a hacker.

Mullen is a Director's Fellow at the MIT Media Lab and a Distinguished Research Scholar with the Smithsonian Institution. He has also addressed NASA's Jet Propulsion Lab and the Royal Society. Mullen is also a member of the scientific advisory board of the C4 Foundation.

In 2013 musicians Ben Harper and Lee Hartney revealed a close friendship with Mullen and described the skateboarder as a "brother". Mullen has also assisted Harper to learn skateboarding, as the musician has undertaken intensive practice in the fifth decade of his life.

Mullen has spoken publicly about his spiritual beliefs; while he thanked "My Lord, Jesus, for all He's done for me" in his autobiography and has studied the Bible, he explained in 2010: "The term religion bums me out. I can't go to church, I've got issues. I've got issues of non-conformity built into me...It's a personal thing and I get so scared about talking about it in public. This guy at HBO once said to me, 'Your skating is like a prayer.' That was the coolest thing anyone's ever said to me. That's what it is for me."
