= Daewon Song =

American skateboarder (born 1975)

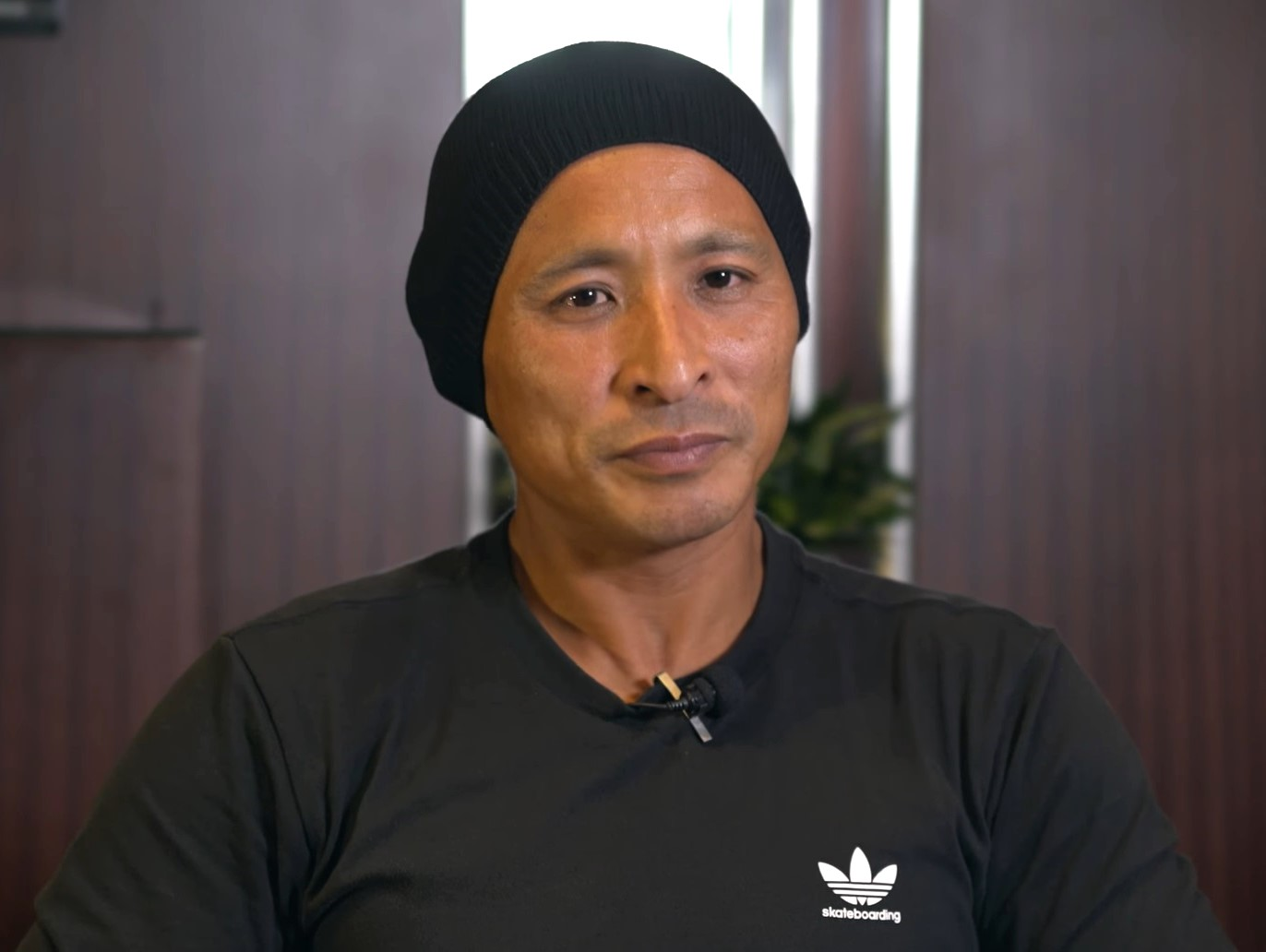
- Song interviewed in 2017

Personal information
- Born: David Daewon Song; February 19, 1975 (age 51) Seoul, South Korea
- Occupation: Professional skateboarder
- Years active: 1989–present
- Height: 5 ft 6 in (168 cm)
- Children: 1

Sport
- Country: United States
- Sport: Skateboarding
- Turned pro: 1991

David Daewon Song (Korean: 송대원; born February 19, 1975) is a Korean-American professional skateboarder. He is the co-founder and co-owner of Almost Skateboards and Thank You Skateboards. In October 2026, it was announced that Daewon was now a sponsored rider for Chocolate Skateboards. Song was named the 2006 "Skater of the Year" by Thrasher magazine, an award that is widely considered to be one of the most significant honors in skateboarding.

== Early life ==
Song was born in Seoul, South Korea, and grew up in Gardena, California, following a year spent with his grandmother in Hawaii. During the first half of his life, Song was raised by his older sister, who also raised Song's brother. Song revealed in a "Milestone" interview for The Skateboard Mag that both of his parents were perceived as "insane" by their neighbors due to their constant fighting—Song explained that, on occasion, he would need to telephone the police. Song's mother, who once shot her husband in the face, died in 1999, predeceasing Song's father.

When he was fourteen years of age, Song started skateboarding during a two-month period when his parents were separated—he was given his first skateboard by his mother and was later sponsored by a skateboard shop in the South Bay area of Los Angeles, California called Sporting Ideas. Prior to this, Song received attention for his artistic abilities, winning drawing contests and engaging in the commercial art field at a very young age. Song provided insight into his family life in a 2005 interview:

You know Asian parents, man; they're gnarly. They want you to become some lead pianist in an orchestra or, like every parent, they want you to become a doctor. I was really into art when I was a young kid, and I won a lot of awards, so my parents thought that's what I'd pursue. Then I got picked up in skateboarding and started getting free stuff. They were tripping, like, "Where are you getting all this free stuff?" They thought I was stealing money from them.

Song attended the 135th Street school in Gardena, known for its aggressive reputation, and has explained the challenges that were present while he was growing up in the area, where gang activity was prolific:

Around my neighborhood, skating was actually big for a time, like in the early '90s. Then it started to die out. There was a lot of gang banging going on in my old neighborhood in Gardena. I was seriously the only skateboarder left at my school. I just hung in there ... A lot of guys quit skating, one got killed, another guy was tagging on a freeway and got killed. I watched all these friends of mine getting into the stupidest things. And I was like, dude, I just need to stick with this skateboard thing. But I didn't stick with it as a career; I just thought it was something to do after school, y'know? Skateboarding's changed so much now. It's like kids skate just to get sponsored. Back then we skated the curb at Rally's burgers just for something to do.

Song has relayed that he sighted Rodney Mullen skateboarding at his school and that Mullen, in turn, had observed Song skateboarding there. Song explained in a 2012 interview that his friend at the time spoke with Mullen and the professional skateboarder revealed that he was impressed by Song's skills and wanted to send Song skateboard decks to ride as an introduction to Mullen's fledgling business. Song agreed to the proposal and the relationship between the two skateboarders, now co-owners of the Almost Skateboards company, commenced at that point in time. Mullen became a mentor figure to Song and the latter became a team rider for the Tensor company as the result of this relationship (as of July 2014, Song continues to be sponsored by Tensor).

== Career ==
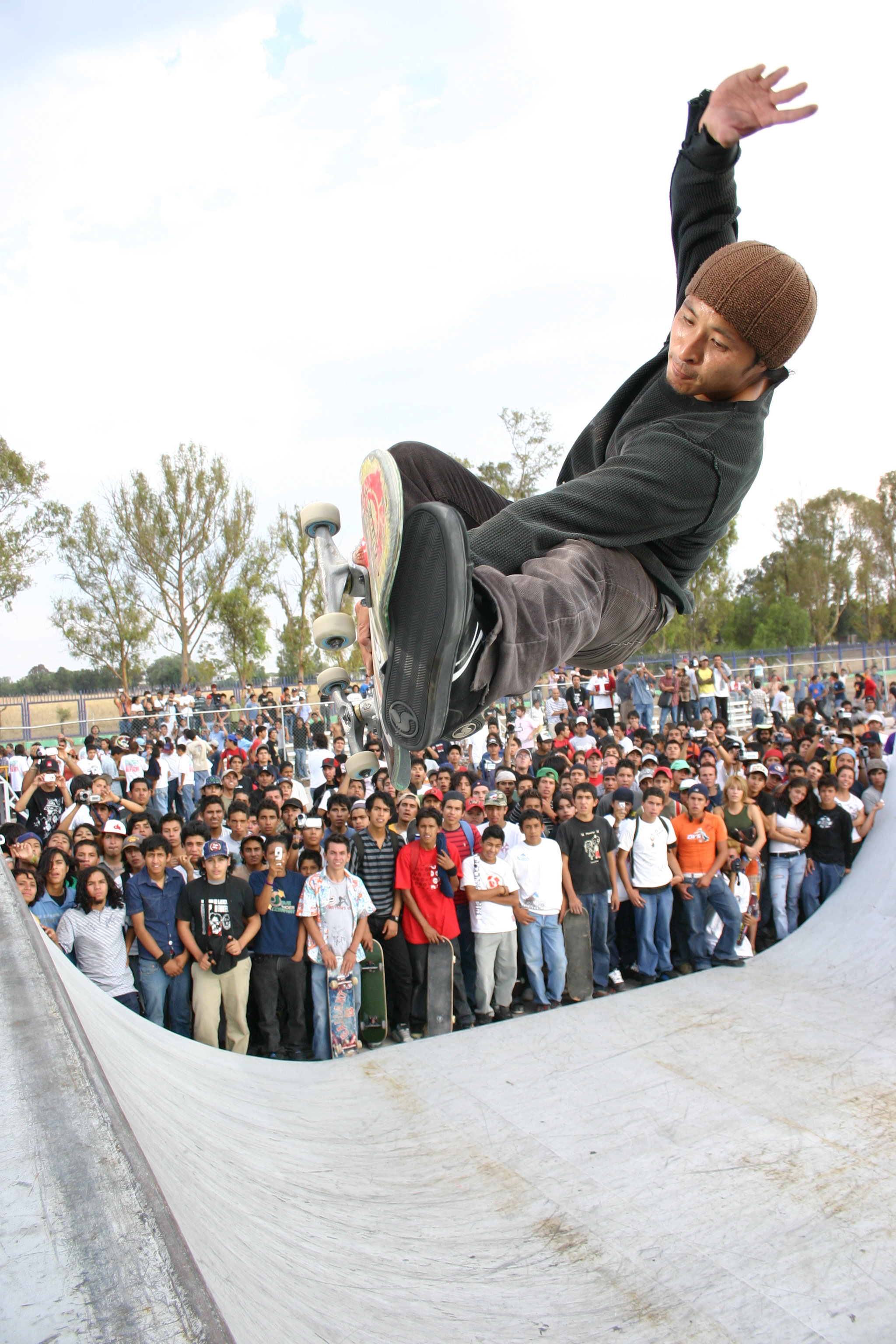
Song skateboarding in Guanajuato, Mexico in 2006

=== World Industries ===
Song became sponsored by World Industries at the age of sixteen years and appeared in numerous video productions for the company, including Love Child (1992). It is in Love Child that Song documented the first hardflip on film. Song has spoken about his time with World Industries in numerous interviews, particularly focusing on his time at the World Industries indoor skate park and being involved with a company that was overseen by Steve Rocco, the founder of World Industries and former business partner of Rodney Mullen—Mullen would later become a close friend and mentor to Song. Videographer, Socrates Leal, who filmed a large portion of the World Industries/Dwindle Distribution footage since the company's inception, released footage from the World Park as part of the "30 Shot" web-based project, including segments that feature Song. Leal has revealed during his narration for one of the segments that Song has always possessed a clear awareness of what aspects of his skateboarding he would like filmed and would often instruct the filmer while skateboarding.

Love Child was then followed up by New World Order (1993) and Song has explained that the skateboarding world had significantly changed in the one-year period between the videos:

Then in '93, with New World Order, things got more serious. More skaters started coming up, and if you were filming something and someone already did it, you'd have to come up with something better. From that point on, filming got a lot harder.

Song stated during his "Epicly Later'd" episode for Vice magazine's web channel that he misses his time at World Industries.

=== Ankle injury ===
In a July 2012 interview with the online magazine, Jenkem, Song revealed that he seriously contemplated ceasing skateboarding between the years 1996 and 1997, following an ankle injury that he sustained during the New World Order period. During this period, Song stated that he was predominantly located in the Long Beach area of Los Angeles while in a relationship with a girlfriend who was a member of the Bloods. Song considered a living modifying cars and eventually returned to skateboarding following a telephone call from his mentor, Rodney Mullen. Song had gone into further detail about this period of his life in a 2005 interview:

I lost touch with a lot of girls, and then I called Rodney and he wasn't doing too good. It was a wake-up call. At that moment I felt like I was a pathetic piece of trash. They did all this for me and I was going to give it up. It was almost as though Rodney brought me into this and had supported me, and now it was my turn to support him. I just woke up and started skating again and tried to make stuff happen again. Then Rodney and me started doing our projects, and everything from that point on has been working out great.

=== Matix Clothing ===
In 1998, Song founded the Matix Clothing apparel company with fellow professional skateboarder, Tim Gavin (retired), and distribution company, Podium Distribution (the Dunlap brothers, Kevin and Brian). In March 2013, Song explained the initial period of the brand's formation:

Gavin brought Rudy Johnson, Jeron Wilson and Sean Sheffey; and then for me, I brought Marc Johnson, Rodney Mullen and, ahh, JB Gillett. And that was our team—including me and Gavin; so there was eight. I remember when it first started—me, Kevin and Brian and Gavin ... just funny how all these things we talked about on the kitchen floor, having pizza, it actually went into motion, and it was, like, "Wow, here are the first samples!"

Song further explained that he was responsible for the origin of the Matix logo, after he drew a squiggle on a napkin that reminded him of someone pushing along on a skateboard. As of 2013, the brand had been existence for fifteen years and Song stated in March of that year, "we are still pushing strong".

The Transworld Business website announced on July 2, 2012, that Matix Clothing had been acquired by "technical apparel brand", Westlife Distribution; the deal included intellectual property, inventory and accounts receivable.

In a press release on September 4, 2012, Matix announced the re-signing of Daewon Song, Marc Johnson, and Mike Anderson to its team roster (notably absent was young and popular former rider, Torey Pudwill). The press release confirmed the relocation of the brand to Los Angeles, and company president, Brian Dunlap, stated, "I'm thrilled with the Westlife transition so far, and bringing these guys back onto the program was key. We have longstanding relationships and friendships that were important to keep intact, and the brand image will only grow stronger with such a good crew representing for us."

As of March 2013, the Matix skate team consisted of Song, Johnson, Mike Anderson, Zach Wallin, Auby Taylor, and Matt Berger—at this time, Song, Johnson, and Anderson all had signature clothing collections for sale. Together with 686, a snowboard company, the company relocated to a new premises in Compton, California, US in 2013. The Matix Fall 2014 catalog video, filmed in the Sierra Nevada region of California, US, was published on the brand's Vimeo channel.

A press release from the Sequential Brands Group, which acquired the shoe brand in mid-2012, revealed that Song had renewed his contract with the company for a further three years. The CEO of the licensing and branding company, Colin Dyne, explained in the press release that "It is critically important to us that the authenticity and integrity of the DVS brand remain in tact [sic]. By moving forward with Daewon, a legend in the skate arena, DVS is remaining true to its heritage". Song stated in the same document that "DVS has been family since 1997 and has always had my back 100% and I will always have their's [sic], 100%!!! Re-signing wasn't even a question! Just needed to make sure the damn pen worked!".

On August 28, 2012, Song revealed in a Twitter post that he had commenced work on a new DVS project.

Song received the cover of The Skateboard Mag, as part of a feature on the DVS Shoes tour to Detroit, US that occurred in late-2012—the photo is credited to Anthony Acosta, a close friend of Song. Song was previously featured on the cover of The Skateboard Mag, in a photo also taken by Acosta, skating a transitional structure that was tied to the back of a truck in Norwalk, California, US—Acosta has explained:

I found this sheet-metal halfpipe sitting on a truck bed about two miles from where I used to live. I knew Daewon was the guy to call for this natural miniramp. We shot a few things that day and ended up getting a cover of The Skateboard Mag with one of the photos.

The DVS Shoes Facebook profile published the advertisement for Song's thirteenth signature shoe model, part of the "Daewon Song Signature Series", named the "Daewon 13"—Song is photographed performing a trick on a rust-covered structure that is in a coastal location.

One-time DVS filmer, Colin Kennedy, released a video compilation that he had produced with the use of footage filmed during the Skate More period, entitled "Daewon vs H2O". The compilation shows various settings in which Song filmed skateboarding tricks in locations where water was a primary factor, including a metropolitan sculpture of a movie reel situated within a pool of water. Part of Kennedy's blurb for the video stated, "Daewon likes a challenge. Watch any of his video parts and you'll see what I mean ... You name it and he's skated it, or at least tried." The footage that is used in the video was shot between 2002 and 2005.

=== Deca ===
After nine years with World Industries, Song left the company in 1999 to found Deca Skateboards, with a team that included Chris Haslam, JB Gillet, Shiloh Greathouse, and Marcus McBride (Cooper Wilt was featured in two "hidden parts" in the second Deca video 2nd to None). After three years of operation, during which time two videos—Sneak Preview and 2nd to None—were produced, Deca ceased operations in 2002. Following the brand's demise, McBride moved onto establishing the DGK company with Stevie Williams, Greathouse rode for Stacy Lowery and Michael Sieben's Bueno brand, JB Gillet joined the Cliche team, while Wilt and Haslam remained with Song for his next board company Artafact.

=== Artafact ===
Following the cessation of Deca, Song launched a short-lived company entitled Artafact in 2002, with Haslam and Wilt included as team riders—the brand was dismantled in 2003 after eight to twelve months of operation. In a 2012 interview for the "Weekend Buzz" segment of the internet-based RIDE channel, Haslam provided a perspective on Artafact in relation to Deca: "I think I liked Artafact better—the layout of the ads was always sick. It was nice and clean and there was, like, possibilities to go there, but, you know, I guess it didn't really go anywhere, so we changed it."

Song released a video part on The Berrics in January 2011 that could be purchased for US$0.99. The downloadable part, entitled "New Year's Dae", was made available for sale on January 11—and was thus promoted as a "1.11.11" video part—the part featured a combination of street, park, and transition skateboarding.

The Almost video 5-Incher was released June 4, 2012, and Mullen is the only team member that is not featured. The film premiered at the Art Theater in Long Beach, California, on May 31, 2012. Song's section in 5-Incher is the penultimate part, with Haslam providing the video's "ender" (final section). On June 18, 2012, Song then released additional footage on the internet, entitled "Daewon 5 Incher B-Side Edit", free of charge.

Song was featured on the cover of the November 2012 issue of Transworld Skateboarding Japan—he is shown performing a trick from his 5-Incher video part. The issue also features a full interview with Song, entitled "Daewon Song Best of 2012", and was sold with a DVD that consisted of the 5-Incher video and the Song B-Sides edit, among other sections.

Video footage was published throughout 2013 of Song performing new tricks that had not been captured on film before. On June 25, 2013, Song filmed a transition trick that was later called a "bolt slapper", and on October 10, 2013, Song was filmed a performing a variation of the bolt slapper, the "360 shove it bolt slapper"—both tricks were filmed at the Crailtap skatepark in Torrance, California, US.

The Almost company celebrated its 10th anniversary with an event at the Berrics indoor skate complex in early March 2014, at which team member Youness Amrani was presented with his inaugural professional skateboard deck. Socrates Leal, a longtime videographer for Dwindle Distribution, created a video retrospective of the brand's growth since inception, entitled "10 Years of Almost." At the same time as the 10-year anniversary, the company released a collaborative series of skateboard decks with the DC Comics comic book brand—Song's deck features the Batman character. On October 26, 2018, Daewon Song left Almost. He and Torey Pudwill who left Plan B Skateboards made their own project called Thank You Skateboards.

=== New sponsors ===
In mid-December 2012, Song was added to the team of Brick Harbor, an online skateboard retailer that had been formed earlier in the same year. The announcement was made in the form of a brief video part, entitled "12 Dae's of Christmas", and a corresponding competition. Since the company's inception, Brick Harbor's team has predominantly consisted of professional skateboarders who had either originated from the East coast of the US, or who continue to be based on that side of the country—riders include Stevie Williams, Jake Johnson, Ishod Wair, Gino Iannucci, and PJ Ladd—and Song is the second West coast team rider to be added to the team, alongside Dennis Busenitz, whose hometown and city of residence is San Francisco, U.S. As of February 2017, though, the company is no longer in business.

During 2012, Song was recruited onto the teams of two new companies that had been founded by fellow professional skateboarders, one who had skated for a clothing company, Matix, that Song had cofounded many years earlier. Paul Rodriguez and Joey Brezinski's (Brezinski had signed a contract with Tensor Trucks, the brand that also sponsors Song, in mid-2010) new bearing company, Andale, was officially launched in 2012 and Song left his position on the Bones bearing team (prior to Bones, Song had released signature model bearings and filmed a video part for the FKD company that, as of February 2013, is within the Syndrome Distribution company). Daewon is featured on the team page holding up a selection of Andale stickers and has joined former Almost professional Ryan Sheckler and ex-Deca rider JB Gillett on the team.

Song is a featured as a sponsored rider on the Glassy Sunhaters sunglasses website and online store, co-owned/co-founded by professional skateboarder, Mike Mo Capaldi, and his brother, Vince. Shortly after the addition of Song, a signature sunglasses model, "The Daeviator", was released and promoted heavily on the relevant websites. The humorous line, "Daewon has personally blessed everyone single pair of these to give you a portion of his balance.....you're welcome." accompanied the product's page on the Glassy Store website.

Loud Headphones is a company that was founded by professional skateboarders, photographers, and videographers around 2012. The company states that its "main objective above all else is to start something that matters" and places an emphasis upon eco-friendly, low-cost packaging that allows more money to be spent on a worthwhile product and donations to its charitable partner the Let Them Hear Foundation. Song is one of the Loud-sponsored skateboarders, alongside other team members such as Sammy Baca and Fred Gall, and has released signature model earbud headphones.

Song was announced as a team member of the newly formed Knox Hardware brand in early October 2013, alongside Chris Cole. The brand was founded by Song's longtime friend and Matix collaborator Gavin, and will also release apparel collections. Gavin explained to TransWorld Business: "Knox's DNA and the story we want to tell is the Americana blue collar hard worker." As of February 2017, though, the brand in no longer active.

=== Setup ===
On January 5, 2013, Song participated in an interview with the Alli Sports website to explain the hardware that he uses for his skateboard. Notable aspects of the interview were: Song rode a 7.6 inches (19 cm) wide skateboard deck for over a decade and, in the period leading up to the interview, had followed through with a decision to transition to a 7.7 inches (20 cm) wide deck—Song stated, "not much of a huge jump, but ... makes a difference."; Song appreciates bright-colored skateboards for "something while it's flipping"—he cites red and black in the interview as preferred colors; Song tightens his trucks "fairly loose", with the back truck tighter than the front for stability—Song describes his front truck as "squirrelly", revealing that he strips down the components of the front truck so that there are only one bushing "below" the truck (between the deck and the truck) and two washers "above" the truck; and Song only rides 50 millimetres (2.0 in) diameter wheels—he states that he has tried to ride 51 millimetres (2.0 in) wheels, but the difference was too significant.

=== Sponsors ===
As of February 2019, Song is sponsored by Thank You skateboards, Matix Clothing, adidas Footwear, Tensor Trucks, Andale Bearings, Mob Griptape, Glassy, Spitfire Wheels, and Loud Headphones.

=== Video game appearances ===
Song has made several appearances as a playable character in video games such as Grind Session, Session: Skate Sim and the Tony Hawk series of games. He featured as a playable character in many iterations of the Tony Hawk series, starting with Tony Hawk's American Wasteland, and appears in every main game since, with the exception of Tony Hawk's Downhill Jam. He also appears in the game Tony Hawk: Ride.

Song participated in "Tony Hawk's Secret Skatepark Tour" of America, which was organized to promote one of Hawk's video games. Alongside other skateboarders who appeared in the video game, Song toured the U.S. with Hawk's entourage and performed at random skatepark locations. During the tour, Song revealed his perspective in a magazine interview: "It's pretty crazy. I'm just used to some team manager knocking on your door, like, "Dude, we gotta get up." On this one we have like schedules."

=== Contests ===
Since cofounding Almost, Song's participation in contests has been limited to the single-elimination tournament "X Games Real Street," in which sponsored skateboarders film a video part that they are judged on. Song competed in the 17th X Games contest in 2011. Alongside Chris Cole, Song was also nominated by Berrics viewers as the most-wanted contestant in the second edition, but failed to enter. Song later explained his reason for not entering contests such as Battle of the Berrics in a July 2013 interview:

Because I'm just the worst under pressure. When someone tells me that I am supposed to do something, you're not going to get it. I'm gonna slam. It has to be spontaneous for me. Every once in a while, I'll get a request and somehow end up doing it, but usually, I can't. Even if it's fairly easy, I won't be able to do it. With those contests, there are all these people watching who have such high expectations for me, I can only lose. I hate it. I don't want to let anybody down so I just shut down.

In early 2014, Song was informed that he was a competitor in the "2Up" manual contest that was held at the Berrics and sponsored by Matix. (A manual is a trick whereby the skateboarder only uses two wheels.) The contest was an invitational and Song competed against nine other skateboarders, and the winner was voted by the fans of the website. Song was declared the winner on March 4, 2014 and received a trophy in addition to US$10,000 cash.

Song was selected, again by the Berrics, for the "In Transition" contest that ran during October 2014. The Berrics "picked 10 of the most progressive skaters on the planet to choose one location each—any location in the world—and film a full part," and Song chose to film his part at Channel Street in Los Angeles, U.S.

=== Awards ===
In 2006, Song was awarded the "Skater of the Year (SOTY)" title by Thrasher magazine. His SOTY feature article appeared in the April 2007 edition of the magazine, for which he also appeared on the front cover.

After winning the Berrics' 2UP and In Transition contests during 2014, Song was voted as the most impactful skateboarder of the year in the Berrics' Populist poll. Song prevailed among a list of nominees that included Guy Mariano and Ben Raybourn, and received his trophy on January 27, 2015.

In 2017, Daewon was inducted into the Skateboarding Hall of Fame.

== Influence ==
Song was identified by Transworld Skateboarding as the twenty-ninth most influential skateboarder of all time in a list that was published on the magazine's digital platform in December 2011. As part of the Transworld series, Stevie Williams, founder and owner of DGK (Dirty Ghetto Kids), identifies Song, together with Mullen, as one of his top five most influential skateboarders, while the same occurred during Tom Penny's interview for the same "Most Influential" series—Penny, identified as the twenty-first most influential, especially commended Song on his manual combinations. Skateboard photographer Giovanni Reda stated in an Instagram post in January 2013: "Daewon Song will forever be the greatest of all time in my eyes!" Paul Rodriguez identified Song in a "top ten" list of favorite professional skateboarders in July 2013:

Daewon to me has the best board control I have ever seen anyone have. The things he can [do] with his skateboard.. technical abilities, the balance he has while going a million miles a hour [sic] is incredible. I've never seen anything like it. He still kills it, he's still ripping and he's been doing it also for 20 plus years at the highest level. He is consistently getting better, constantly pushing and reaching for [the] peak [of] his ability ... My favorite video part of his would be "Rodney vs. Daewon Round One"... When that video was out and Round 2 I remember watching those video parts countlessly. I may have seen those parts a million times, literally.

Long-time friend and professional skateboarder Daniel Castillo explained his relationship to Daewon in relation to skateboarding in an August 2013 interview:

He has the same enthusiasm as he did when we were like 14-15. And he's still learning new tricks, which is insane because the dude has enough tricks. He's insane & is always amped to skate. It could honestly be anything. He'd be amped to skate a little curb on the street. That's why I love skating with him because when I'm skating with him, it feels like I'm that age again. Like I'm 14. Anytime I hang out or skate with him, I have no care in the world except skating.

In a 2005 Skateboarder interview, Song listed Rodney Mullen, Natas Kaupas, Christian Hosoi, Chris Haslam, and Eric Dressen as his top five "timeless influences." In the same interview, Song listed his top five "Most underrated skaters" as Alan Peterson, Chany Jeanguenin, Cooper Wilt, Dan Drehobl, all pool skaters. After being named the twenty-ninth most influential skateboarder of all time by Transworld Skateboarding, Song listed his own top five all-time skateboarding influences: "Rodney Mullen. Christian Hosoi, just the way he flew—who else could make lycra shorts cool? Tommy Guerrero, Steve Caballero, and Natas Kaupas. Once he spun on that fire hydrant everyone was mesmerized, like going to their first magic show." Song also revealed that he was interested in the Z-Boys when he was a young skateboarder.

== Perspectives ==
In an interview with Juice magazine, Song explained his passion for skateboarding:

I like skateboarding for what it is. I like being able to do it by myself. You need another person to hit the ball. You need someone to pitch something at you or block for you to make a basket. With skateboarding, I just pick up my board and do exactly what I want to do. Some days I have a good day and some days I feel like a complete dip-shit; like I've never been skateboarding in my life. I love the experience of it. I love the fact that on one day I can do everything I've ever learned and the next day I feel like I've lost everything. That's skateboarding. It's amazing. I like the challenges. Skateboarding is one of the most challenging things.

Song has been vocal about the importance of fun in regard to skateboarding and the importance of individuality, in contrast to elitism and dogmatism in the sub-culture. In his appearance on Vice's Epicly Later'd program, Song inadvertently meets a fan at a public skate location that appeared in his video part for Love Child and shares an opinion with the teenage male: "Just keep skating. Don't even worry about ... don't ever sweat, like, 'is this good enough? Is that good enough?' Like, as long as you're happy with it, that's fine." Song expanded upon this sentiment in a voiceover segment for Thrasher magazine, in relation to Haslam's footage in Cheese and Crackers, stating:

Do whatever you want—go skate a mini-ramp; go skate a really mini-ramp; go skate a big ramp. Basically, just go skate; set up whatever you want and don't worry about what people say, like, 'Ah, that was stupid', or, 'That was ugly', or 'That's not cool'—it's, you know, who cares what's cool? You're the one who gets to do it. They're just–some people are just jealous 'cause they're not the ones who can do it, so, even if it is something that they consider, 'Oh, that's ugly', once they–if they can do it and they think it's ugly, then, you know, that's their opinion and that's cool, you know. But when people that don't even skate at all and they wanna sit there and go, 'That was lame', that's just, you know, that just sucks.

Song listed the following video parts as his all-time favorites in a 2011 interview with online magazine, Caught in the Crossfire: John Cardiel: Sight Unseen, Sean Sheffey: Life, and PJ Ladd: PJ Ladd's Wonderful, Horrible Life.

Song resides in San Pedro, Los Angeles, California, US.

=== Fatherhood ===
In 2005, Song provided the public with an insight into his role as a father:

It's crazy. He [son's name] brings a different perspective on the world. Having a kid is a lot of work, though. Holy shit! I'd be filming all day and get home sometimes at 12 or 1 in the morning, and he'd just get up—boom!—and wouldn't go to bed until 6 in the morning. This was seriously like every other day. I was just exhausted.

In a Twitter post and Pheed photo upload on January 1, 2013, Song featured an image of his son with a pet dog and the following blurb: "2013!!! it's amazing every time I get 2 see my son he teaches me something new, it's the small things i love about being a dad and am blessed to have such a great son !!"

== Filmography ==
- Almost: Round Three (2004)
- DVS: Skate More (2005)
- Almost: Cheese and Crackers (2006)
- DVS: Dudes Dudes Dudes (2008)
- Adidas: Mike & Daewon "DaeTrip" (2024)
