= Ryan Sheckler =

American professional skateboarder (born 1989)

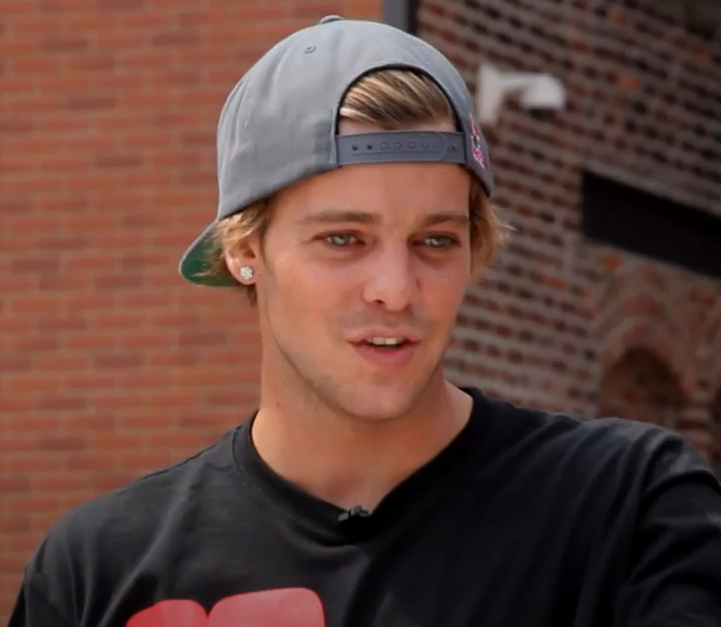
- Sheckler in 2012

Personal information
- Full name: Ryan Allen Sheckler
- Born: December 30, 1989 (age 36) San Clemente, California, U.S.
- Occupation: Professional skateboarder
- Years active: 1998–present
- Height: 5 ft 5 in (165 cm) – 5 ft 8 in (173 cm)
- Weight: 165 lb (75 kg)

Sport
- Country: United States
- Sport: Skateboarding
- Turned pro: 2003
Medal record
Summer X Games
Representing United States
Gold medal – first place	2003 Los Angeles	Park
Gold medal – first place	2008 Los Angeles	Street
Gold medal – first place	2010 Los Angeles	Street
Silver medal – second place	2006 Los Angeles	Street
Silver medal – second place	2012 Los Angeles	Street
Bronze medal – third place	2011 Los Angeles	Street
Bronze medal – third place	2015 Austin	Street

Ryan Allen Sheckler (born December 30, 1989) is an American professional skateboarder and entrepreneur, and the star of the MTV-produced reality television series Life of Ryan, which ran from 2007 to 2009. He also starred in four seasons of the short-format video series Sheckler Sessions on Red Bull TV. Sheckler was listed in Fox Weekly's "15 Most Influential Skateboarders of All-Time" article.

== Early life ==
Sheckler was raised in a family of three children—his two younger brothers are named Shane and Kane. Sheckler was introduced to skateboarding when he discovered his father's skateboard at the age of two. Sheckler's father provided encouragement by revealing that he had learned his first kickflip when he was approximately six years of age. In a 2012 interview for the internet-based channel Network A, Sheckler revealed that the San Clemente skate park is the location where he began skateboarding with his best friend Jered Marburger and that he was present at the opening of the park.

== Professional skateboarding ==
=== 1998–2006: First sponsors, Round Three ===
Sheckler's sponsors were the Etnies skate shoe company and Oakley, Inc., both of which made contact with Sheckler when he was around seven years old. Etnies invited both Sheckler and his brother Shane to the company's California headquarters, where he was given his first pair of Etnies shoes; however, his official relationship with the brand ended in 1998.

In 1999, Sheckler was featured on the cover of Big Brother magazine's controversial "Kids Issue". He was not allowed to read the issue by his parents due to the graphic material contained in it. Backlash of the publication resulted in lawsuits forcing the magazine being labeled as 'for adults only' due its inclusion of inappropriate interview questions of the teenage skateboard subjects, instructions on drug use, how to commit acts of self harm, and explicit photos throughout the magazine.

In 2003, professional skateboarders and entrepreneurs Rodney Mullen and Daewon Song founded the skateboard company Almost. Sheckler, together with Greg Lutzka, was a foundational member of this team and was promoted to professional status during his time with the company. Almost team member Chris Haslam explained in January 2012: "Almost is when Rodney [Mullen] came together with Daewon [Song] ... and Lutzka, and Sheckler."

Sheckler appeared in the inaugural Almost video Almost: Round Three alongside Cooper Wilt, Haslam, Lutzka, Mullen, and Song; Sheckler's video part is edited to the Cure song "Why Can't I Be You?"

=== 2007–2012: Plan B, Life of Ryan, Superfuture ===
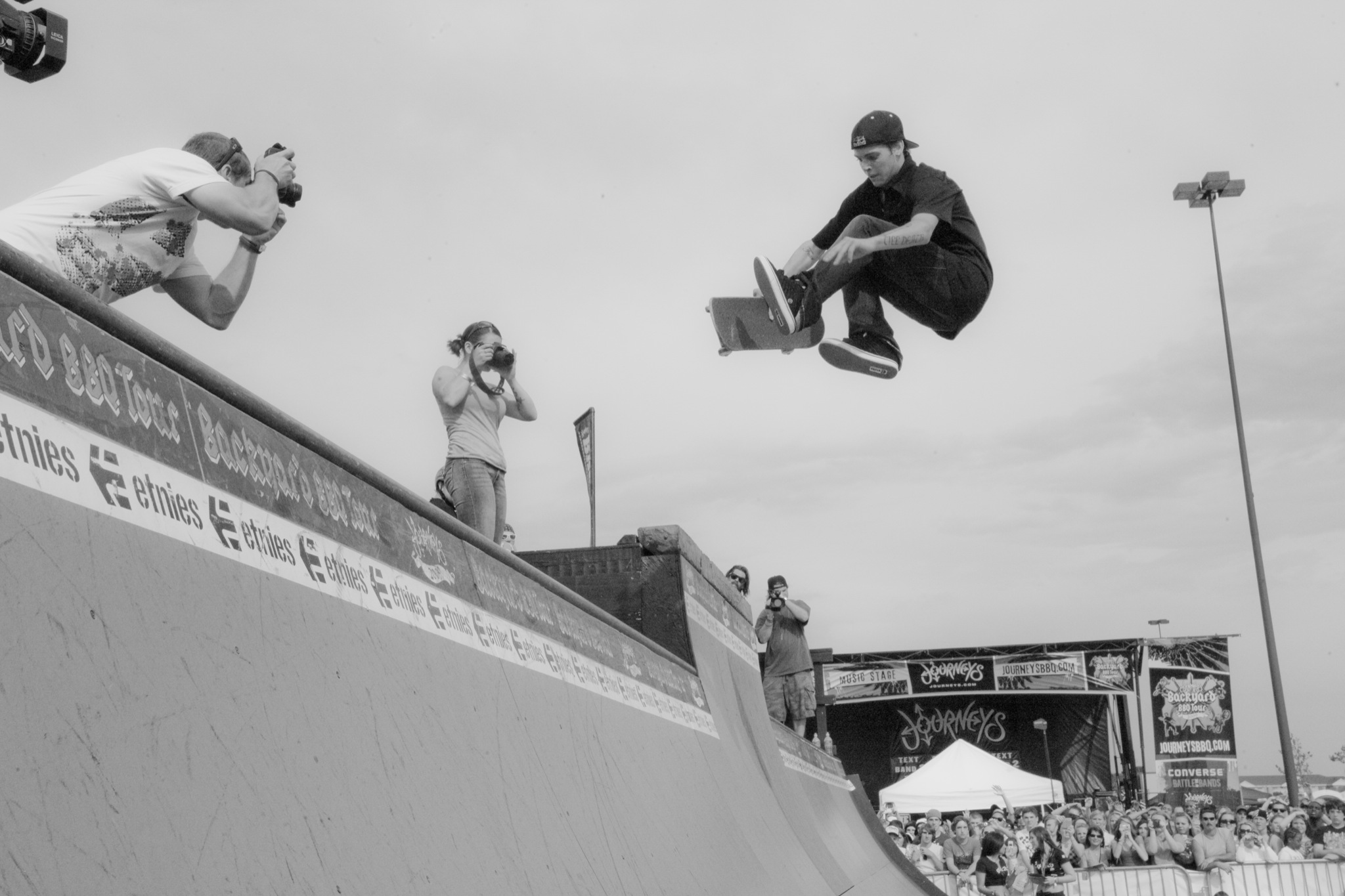
Sheckler skating in 2009

After appearing in Almost: Round Three, Sheckler resigned from the company to join the relaunched Plan B Skateboards deck and apparel company in 2007—at that time, the team consisted of Brian Wenning, Pat Duffy, Ryan Gallant, PJ Ladd, Paul Rodriguez, Colin McKay, and Danny Way. Sheckler's MTV reality series, Life of Ryan, premiered in August 2007. Jason Carbone and Sarah Kane were the show's executive producers, and both of Sheckler's brothers starred in the series, alongside his childhood friends Tony, Casey and Taylor.

Following his recruitment into the ranks of Plan B, Sheckler successfully cleared a 55 feet (17 m) gap on Bob Burnquist's Mega Ramp construction (a segmented ramp that typically consists of 50 feet (15 m), 60 feet (18 m), or 70 feet (21 m)-foot gaps, and a 27 feet (8.2 m)-tall "quarterpipe" ramp) in April 2008, with Way also in attendance. Sheckler appeared in the final section of Plan B's Superfuture promotional video, released in 2008, which also consisted of footage from Sheckler's Mega Ramp skateboarding.

The Superfuture part also featured a historic trick that Sheckler completed at a location known as the "Costco gap." Skateboard photographer Atiba Jefferson and filmer Ricki Bedenbaugh were present when Sheckler completed the trick, and both recalled in 2013 that they were very nervous due to the degree of difficulty involved. The trick was finalized on the fourth try and led to Sheckler appearing on the cover of The Skateboard Mag magazine, which Jefferson shot. Jefferson later described what he observed: "No hands down, no nothing. He just, like, once he caught it, he just ... set it down."

The Life of Ryan series concluded in 2009 after three seasons, with only half of the planned episodes completed in the final season. Sheckler later explained the decision to cease production, which was entirely his own:

When I started the show I said, "If it gets me away from my actual skateboarding fans and gets me away from skateboarding, then I'm not going to do the show anymore." That's why our third season was just six episodes; we cut it in half. I was, like, "I can't do it anymore! It's going to be more detrimental to my career than positive." We just quit. We stopped it.

The Red Bull online series "Sheckler Sessions" was launched in June 2012 and the first episode featured the Plan B team at the Zumiez "Couch Tour" event. In an online interview that was published in September 2012, Sheckler revealed that, at the time of the interview, he was in the process of building a new skateboard training facility.

=== 2013–present: Teasers, Dew Tour Streetstyle, True ===
By the beginning of 2013, discussion continued, among both skateboarding fans and the industry, regarding whether the relaunched Plan B team would release its first full-length video. Way confirmed that the production process was underway in a January 2013 interview for the online magazine Jenkem, during which time he mentioned Sheckler:

They [Plan B team] are doing the best tricks consistently with every variation of it down the biggest stuff. And it doesn't take them long, so they have a lot of it. For example when we went to China recently, Sheckler alone has more footage from his one trip than all of the Girl team from their China trips combined. I'm not trying to diss on Girl, just trying to put it in perspective, what I think his strengths are.

Sheckler then appeared in the second teaser for the inaugural full-length video, which was published online in February 2013. Sheckler is filmed performing a kickflip in a street-based setting, while teammates Torey Pudwill and Duffy are also present. A promotional video was released in May 2013, commemorating Sheckler's 15th year with the Etnies brand. Sheckler explains in the video that he received his first pair of free skate shoes from the company and skated in Etnies shoes ever since.

The final episode of the second season of the "Sheckler Sessions" online series was aired in November 2013 and signaled the conclusion of the entire show. Titled "Southern Comfort," the episode was filmed in the U.S. state of North Carolina, and featured fellow professional skateboarders Zered Bassett and Bobby Worrest.

The Volcom clothing and apparel company announced in January 2014 that Sheckler rejoined the brand's team of sponsored skateboarders after a period of sponsorship during the early part of Sheckler's career. The announcement was made in the form of a 15-second online video in which Sheckler signs the Volcom contract on January 21, 2014.

The first official trailer for the Plan B full-length video was published in July 2014, and served as the announcement of the video's title: "True." Following victories at the 2012 and 2013 Dew Tour Streetstyle events, Sheckler won the contest for the third consecutive time in August 2014. The Streetstyle event was a new downhill concept added to the tour in 2012 and spanned across four blocks above San Francisco's Bay Bridge. The event returned to San Francisco in 2013 and was held in Portland, Oregon, U.S., in 2014.

On January 10, 2022, Sheckler announced his departure from Plan B after 16 years of sponsorship.

== Video games ==
Sheckler is a playable character in Tony Hawk's Underground 2, Tony Hawk's American Wasteland, Tony Hawk's Project 8, Tony Hawk's Proving Ground.

== The Sheckler Foundation ==
In 2008, the Sheckler Foundation was created to assist children, and injured and recovering athletes—the Foundation presents its overall goal as the empowerment of "our community to "Be the Change!"." Two of the Foundation's major annual charity events are "Skate For A Cause" (the fourth event occurred in May 2013) and the "Ryan Sheckler X Games Celebrity Golf Tournament" (the fifth event occurred in 2012).

A November 12, 2013 press release introduced the foundation's inaugural "SkateBOARD" members. Consisting of professional skateboarders Greg Lutzka, Christian Hosoi, Fabrizio Santos, Filipe Gustavo, and Manny Santiago, the group will "help support and promote the Sheckler Foundation's projects", as the organization seeks to increase its exposure.

In May 2009, Sheckler launched the "RS" clothing line, but as of November 2013, the brand is not featured on Sheckler's personal website and an official website does not exist.

== Personal life ==
In a 2012 interview by Network A, Sheckler said that he enjoys surfing, relaxing, and spending time with his family when he is not skateboarding, adding that his priorities in life are: "Stay healthy, as much as I can; be a good brother; be a good son, to my parents; make sure I can do anything to keep my family safe; finish this Plan B part and just keep skating—keep filming video parts; be me, I guess—just be myself and not worry about what people think." However, Sheckler concluded by stating that his main priority is ensuring the health and safety of his family.

In late 2017, Sheckler stated that he had been an alcoholic for the last few years, until the point his addiction jeopardized his skateboarding career and was admitted into rehab. Sheckler stated in an interview with Graham Bensinger that he is a born-again Christian.

In November 2021, Sheckler proposed to his girlfriend Abigail Baloun of one and half years. On March 3, 2022, Sheckler and Baloun got married after a 90-day engagement. One year after getting married, Sheckler and his wife Abigail welcomed their daughter Olive Oleta born on March 3, 2023. Their second daughter Lilah Fox was born on July 8, 2024.

== Training ==
Sheckler has utilized plyometrics, Olympic weightlifting techniques and unilateral strength and stability exercises to target qualities of fitness and specific adaptation.

== Contests ==
Sheckler first participated as a competitor in a skateboarding contest in 2002.

=== 2003 ===
- Gravity Games: 1st (Street)
- Slam City Jam – Vancouver, Canada: 1st (Street)
- X Games: 1st (Park)
- United States Skateboarding Championships: 3rd (Street)
- Vans Triple Crown: 1st – overall (Street)
- World Cup of Skateboarding (WCS): 1st – overall (Street)

=== 2004 ===
- Gravity Games, third place (Street)
- United States Skateboarding Championships, first place (Street)
- Vans Triple Crown, Vancouver event; third place (Street)
- Vans Triple Crown, Cleveland event; third place (Street)
- World Cup of Skateboarding, overall second place (Street)

=== 2005 ===
- AST Dew Tour – Louisville, US: 1st (Park)
- AST Dew Tour – Denver, US: 1st (Park)
- AST Dew Tour – Portland, US: 2nd (Park)
- AST Dew Tour – San Jose, US: 1st (Park)
- AST Dew Tour – Orlando, US: 3rd (Park)
- AST Dew Tour: 1st – overall (Park)
- Globe World Cup, Melbourne event; second place (Street)
- World Championship of Skateboarding, third place (Street)

=== 2006 ===
- Tampa Pro: 5th (Street)
- AST Dew Tour – Louisville, US: 1st (Park)
- AST Dew Tour – Denver, US: 4th (Park)
- AST Dew Tour – Portland: 1st (Park)
- AST Dew Tour – San Jose, US: 1st (Park)
- AST Dew Tour – Orlando, US: 2nd (Park)
- AST Dew Tour: 1st – overall (Park)
- X Games XII (Los Angeles), US: 2nd (Park)
- Globe World Cup – Melbourne, Australia: 1st (Street)

=== 2008 ===
- Thrasher Magazine's "Bust or Bail": 1st
- X Games XIII: 1st (Street)

=== 2010 ===
- X Games XIV: 1st (Street)

=== 2011 ===
- X Games XVI: 3rd (Street)
- Simple Session: 1st (Street)

=== 2012 ===
- X Games XVII: 2nd (Street)
- Street League Skateboarding 3rd Series, 3rd Stop (Glendale, AZ): 3rd
- Dew Tour: 1st (Streetstyle)

=== 2013 ===
- Dew Tour: 1st (Streetstyle)

=== 2014 ===
- Dew Tour: 1st (Streetstyle)

== Filmography ==
Year	Title	Role	Notes
2001	MVP 2: Most Vertical Primate	Neil Nellis	
2003	Grind	Rod St. James	
2004	What's New, Scooby-Doo?	Himself	"The San Franpsycho" (season 2: episode 8)
2004	Almost: Round Three	Himself	Documentary
2005	Dishdogz	Himself	
2007–2009	Life of Ryan	Himself	Reality TV series
2008	Spy School	Himself	Cameo
2008	True Jackson, VP	Himself	"Ryan on Wheels" (season 1: episode 4)
2009	Rob Dyrdek's Fantasy Factory	Himself	"Dusty Monkey" (season 1: episode 12)
2009	Street Dreams	Eric Jones	
2010	Tooth Fairy	Mick Donnelly	

== Videography ==
- Digital: Everyday (2003)
- Tony Hawk's Secret Skatepark Tour (2004)
- Thrasher: King of the Road 2004 (2004)
- Almost: Almost: Round Three (2004)
- Volcom: Chichagof (2004)
- FuelTV: Firsthand: Ryan Sheckler (2005)
- Globe: World Cup Skateboarding 2005 (2005)
- Tony Hawk's Secret Skatepark Tour 2 (2006)
- Etnies: Restless (2006)
- Oakley: Our Life (2006)
- Globe: The Global Assault (2006)
- Plan B: Plan B in Dominican Republic (2008)
- Plan B: Superfuture (2008)
- Etnies: Sangria Nights (2009)
- Plan B: Plan B in Moscow, Russia (2009)
- Strange Notes: Wish You Were Here (2009)
- Thrasher: King of the Road 2010 (2010)
- Red Bull: Perspective (2013)
- Plan B: True (2014)
- Justin Bieber - What Do You Mean? (lyric video) (2015)
- Lifer - (2023)
- Rolling Away - (2023)

== See also ==
- Sole Technology
- Skate shoes
- Flip tricks
- Skateboarding
