= Online magazine =

Website-based magazine

An online magazine is a magazine published on the Internet, through bulletin board systems and other forms of public computer networks. One of the first magazines to convert from a print magazine format to an online only magazine was the computer magazine Datamation. Some online magazines distributed through the World Wide Web call themselves webzines. An ezine (also spelled e-zine) is a more specialized term appropriately used for small magazines and newsletters distributed by any electronic method, for example, by email.

Some social groups may use the terms cyberzine and hyperzine when referring to electronically distributed resources. Similarly, some online magazines may refer to themselves as "electronic magazines", "digital magazines", or "e-magazines" to reflect their readership demographics or to capture alternative terms and spellings in online searches. An online magazine shares some features with a blog and also with online newspapers, but can usually be distinguished by its approach to editorial control. Magazines typically have editors or editorial boards who review submissions and perform a quality control function to ensure that all material meets the expectations of the publishers (those investing time or money in its production) and the readership.

Many large print publishers now provide digital editions (digital reproductions of their print magazine titles) through various online services for a fee. These service providers also refer to their collections of these digital format products as online magazines, and sometimes as digital magazines. Online magazines representing matters of interest to specialists or societies for academic subjects, science, trade, or industry are typically referred to as online journals.

== Business model ==
It's amazing how inexpensive a publication can be if it doesn't need to pay for writing, editing, design, paper, ink, or postage.
—Mega 'Zines, Macworld (1995)

Many general interest online magazines provide free access to all aspects of their online content, although some publishers have opted to require a subscription fee to access premium online article and/or multimedia content. Online magazines may generate revenue based on targeted search ads to website visitors, banner ads (online display advertising), affiliations to retail web sites, classified advertisements, product-purchase capabilities, advertiser directory links, or alternative informational, commercial purpose.

Due to their low cost and initial non-mainstream targets, the original online magazines, e-zines and disk magazines (or diskmags), may be seen as a disruptive technology to traditional publishing houses. The high cost of print publication and large Web readership has encouraged these publishers to embrace the World Wide Web as a marketing and content delivery system and another medium for delivering their advertisers' messages.

== Growth ==
In the late 1990s, e-zine publishers began adapting to the interactive and informative qualities of the internet instead of simply duplicating print magazines on the web. Publishers of traditional print magazines and entrepreneurs with an eye to a potential readership in the millions started publishing online magazines. Salon.com, founded in July 1995 by David Talbot, was launched with considerable media exposure and today reports 5.8 million monthly unique visitors. In the 2000s, some webzines began appearing in a printed format to complement their online versions.

== See also ==
- Computer magazine
- Electronic journal
- List of online magazines
- Online newspaper
- Video magazine
