= The Mr. Move =

American rapper

- Born: Reggie Cunnigham; October 20, 1977 (age 48)
- Origin: Atlanta, Georgia
- Genres: Underground hip hop, dirty South, punk rock
- Occupation: MC
- Years active: 2002-present
- Labels: Blacken Records (2002-2006), Bootybomb Records (2006-present)
- Website: http://www.themrmove.com/

The Mr. Move (born Reggie Cunnigham) is a rapper born in Atlanta, Georgia, currently based in New York City. To date, he has released two full-length albums, one mix tape, and has contributed to one movie soundtrack. These releases have gained The Mr. Move a notably strong cult following. Frequent topics of his songs are his heavy drug use, the consequences of alcoholism and his hedonistic lifestyle.

== Career ==
The Mr. Move rose to prominence in 2002 after moving from Atlanta to New York City and performing at parties. His first EP on BMX rider Darryl Nau's Blacken Records helped put two of his songs, "Ghetto Whomper" and "Wine & Fried Chicken", on the worldwide released DVDs Almost Round 3 and Props Mega Tour 3. He released his debut album, Easy, on August 22, 2006. He released Abuse, his second album on February 10, 2009. Since 2006 The Mr. Move has released all of his albums on his own label, Bootybomb Records.

Artists that The Mr. Move has collaborated with include Trouble Andrew, Lil' Jon, and Spank Rock on the song "I'm Wasted" from The Trouble Gang Mixtape; Avenue D on the song "Cock Rock" from their album As Free As I Want To Be; and DJ Ben Brunnemer on The Mr. Move's latest mix tape Georgie the Peach. The Mr. Move has also collaborated with director Ti West twice; contributing the original song "I Raise Hell" to his 2005 horror film The Roost and co-starring in West's 2007 film Trigger Man.

As of 2010, The Mr. Move has become a regular performer at the New York City nightclub Santos Party House, which is owned by rocker Andrew W. K.

== Discography ==
=== Albums ===
- Easy (2006)
- Abuse (2009)

=== Mixtapes ===
- Georgie the Peach (2010)
- The Kenny Powers of Rap (TBA)

=== Singles ===
- "Bump Bump Bang Bang" (2008)

=== Appearances ===
- "Cock Rock" with Avenue D (2006)
- "I'm Wasted" with Lil' Jon, Spank Rock and Trouble Andrew (2010)
