= Almost Skateboards =

American skateboard company

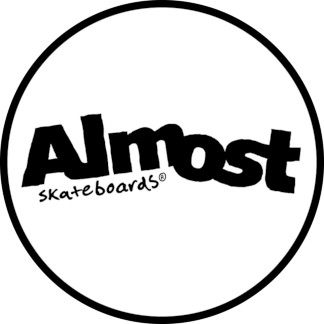
- Type: Private
- Founded: 2003; 23 years ago
- Headquarters: El Segundo, California, U.S.
- Key people: Rodney Mullen and Daewon Song
- Products: Skateboard decks, equipment, apparel, accessories
- Website: almostskateboards.com

Almost Skateboards is an American skateboard company founded by professional skateboarders and business partners Rodney Mullen and Daewon Song. The company manufactures skateboard decks using 7-ply, 8-ply, and carbon fiber constructions, while the decks are bound with resin epoxy glue. As of November 2014, the brand is distributed by Dwindle Distribution.

== History ==
=== 2003–2006: Formation, Round Three, Cheese & Crackers ===
Almost Skateboards was founded in 2003 by Mullen and Song after leaving their previous companies, enjoi and Artafact, respectively. Mullen explained in July 2014 that he knew in his "heart" that the founder of enjoi, Marc Johnson, wanted to leave the company. After he received the news from a friend of Johnson's, Mullen—who had been thinking about collaborating with Song prior to Johnson's departure, as the pair had been skateboarding together over a long period of time—called Song:

I wanted so badly to do something with Daewon [Song]—Daewon was my first call: "Oh man, I have bad news ... but I got some other news. I got this idea—you wanna do something together? Start something new?" And, I could hear the excitement in Daewon's voice. So, that's why it started: I'd been wanting to do it for so long! But, opportunity never really came up—until then.

The initial team also consisted of Cooper Wilt, Chris Haslam, Ryan Sheckler, Greg Lutzka. The Almost: Round Three video featured all of the brand's original team riders and was released in 2004 to launch the brand.

Lewis Marnell was introduced as the company's first amateur in 2006 through a bonus part included with the company's Cheese and Crackers video—the second Almost video release—that features Song and Haslam on a mini-ramp structure—Curtis Mayfield's "Move On Up" is the soundtrack to Marnell's part.

=== 2007–2013: New recruits, 5-Incher, Marnell's death ===
Sheckler left Almost to join the newly reformed Plan B Skateboards team in January 2007. Torey Pudwill was announced as the company's new amateur in 2007, and both he and Marnell were promoted to the professional ranks in 2008. For Marnell's professional inauguration, Song and videographer Socrates Leal filmed a spoof video part to welcome Marnell. The video, entitled "Almost Filmer Asshole", is shot through the lens of a "poacher" (someone who is attempting to film footage of another skateboarder—usually a professional skateboarder—when that person has not been given permission to do so) who throws Marnell's first professional Almost skateboard deck into the view of the camera, upon being caught by Song and Leal; the video was published on the Almost website and YouTube. Marnell's first board graphic featured a lion waving a Rastafarian flag.

Like Sheckler, Pudwill left Almost to join Plan B in March 2010 and Pudwill's personal friend, Justin Schulte, was eventually announced as the company's new amateur rider after a trial period to determine if he was a suitable fit. Schulte had previously been sponsored by Element Skateboards, but had also been in contact with Song, who asked Schulte to let him know about his progress. An introductory video was released to welcome Schulte in February 2010. Lutzka was the next team member to leave Almost, as he became sponsored by Darkstar in May 2010.

German amateur skateboarder Willow was announced as the new Almost team member in November 2010 and a welcome video was also published on the internet. Willow had previously been sponsored by Flip Skateboards.

The company released a short video in October 2012, in which Haslam surprises Willow with his first professional skateboard deck model at a signing in Germany. On November 26, 2012, "Willow's World", a full-length video part edited by Mike Manzoori (Sole Technology), was released on the Transworld Skateboarding website to commemorate the team rider's professional status. Youness Amrani was announced as the company's next amateur rider in April 2011.

The company premiered its third video production, 5-Incher, in June 2012 and used the release to introduce new amateur rider Mitchie Brusco, as well as a "flow" team consisting of Matty "Schmatty" Chaffin, CJ Tambornino, Michael Sommer, and Issey Yumiba. ("Flow" denotes the status of a team member prior to their announcement as an amateur and typically do not receive any financial remuneration.) The video featured parts from all of the Almost team—with the exception of Mullen, who was recovering from an injury—and the world premiere occurred in Long Beach, California, US. The company made no mention of Schulte's status and at the time of the premiere, he was no longer listed as a team member. The video was Marnell's final appearance in an Almost production, as he died in January 2013 from a diabetes-related complication.

In August 2013, Almost collaborated with Nike SB and TransWorld Skateboarding magazine on a feature for amateur rider Amrani. Entitled "Marrakesh Express", the project combined a print article with a video part that was launched on the TransWorld website on August 9, 2013. Videographer Chris Thiesson accompanied Amrani as he skated and traveled between "Casablanca and Marrakesh by way of Rabat, Kenitra, and Agadir" in Morocco. Amrani was born in Morocco, but grew up in Belgium.

=== 2013–present: "Almost Famous," 10th anniversary ===
The company commenced a series on Tony Hawk's RIDE channel, hosted on YouTube, in December 2013. Titled "Almost Famous," the series has featured skateboarder and artist Brian Lotti and a "craziest trick" contest.

The company celebrated its 10th anniversary with an event at the Berrics indoor skate complex in early March 2014, at which Amrani was presented with his inaugural professional skateboard deck. Leal, a longtime videographer for Dwindle Distribution, created a video retrospective of the brand's growth since inception, entitled "10 Years of Almost." At the same time as the 10-year anniversary, the company released a collaborative series of skateboard decks with the DC Comics comic book brand.

During 2014, Song won two contests held at and by the Berrics: "2 UP" in March and "In Transition" in October. The former was a manual (skateboarding with a full setup, but only using two wheels) contest that also involved the use of custom-made obstacles, and involved other professional competitors such as Brandon Biebel and Chris Cole. The In Transition contest was created through the selection of a list of skateboarders who were each invited to film a transition (also known as "vert skateboarding," whereby the skateboarder rides a skateboard on a skate ramp, or other incline, and transitions from the horizontal plane to the vertical plane to perform tricks) video part at a location of their choosing.

== Death of Lewis Marnell ==
An official announcement on January 20, 2013 revealed that Marnell had died in the 48 hours prior to the announcement, and details of the death were not provided. Marnell had released an Almost video part in the six months prior to his death—5-Incher.

Song stated on his Instagram profile, "@lewismarnell you are a true inspiration brotha and will be missed thank u for showing the world your amazing gifts, and thank u for being such a positive,kind and giving friend to all! RIP". Song then published another photograph on January 21, 2013, stating, "Shot this a while back!! reminded me of #lewismarnell 🙏 !! freedom is a gift and love and respect for each other makes for a better world !! #sorryboutpreaching".

Marnell's other teammates, Wilt and Haslam, also posted tributes on their respective Instagram profiles; Wilt wrote:

Today was rough one... Woke up to the news that Lewis Marnell had passed away. A great friend and teammate for the last 6 and a half years. Things just won't be the same without him--- he's gone too soon but I'm glad to know that he made the most of his life! He traveled nonstop, met and married a great girl, and got to skateboard for a living--- all with a huge smile on his face. Gonna miss him and remember him always, a true legend- Lewis Marnell!!

On January 20, 2013, Haslam posted a photo of Marnell seated on a purpose-built bicycle that Marnell had constructed, whereby a set of speakers is situated on a platform at the front of the bicycle. Luis Cruz, Almost's brand manager, posted the following tribute to the Almost Skateboards Instagram profile: "We are privileged to have had Lewis Marnell part of the Almost family. He will be loved and remembered for ever. RIP brother… you will be greatly missed."

The brand's product catalog for spring 2013 was released in mid-March and featured the full team lineup up until that point, including Marnell and corresponding signature boards. The final page of the catalog featured a photographic portrait of Marnell and the following statement: "LEWIS MARNELL NEVER FORGOTTEN 1982 – 2013". The inaugural episode of "Almost Famous" concluded with a trick from Marnell and the written statement: "NEVER FORGOTTEN," and the entire third episode, titled "Lewis Marnell Forever," was dedicated to Marnell.

As of November 2014, Marnell remains on the team page of the Almost website, while a Marnell signature skateboard deck was available as part of the brands "Holiday 2014" catalog that was released on September 15, 2014. The Holiday 2014 catalog blurb explains that "all proceeds from Lewis Marnell's boards go directly to his family."

== Carbon construction decks ==
- The Über Light is a 7-ply Resin deck with a carbon fiber inner layer that constitutes a foam core. The design creates a stronger, lighter and more rigid board in comparison to regular wood decks. Only 500 Über Light boards (named "Über Experimental") were made when the model was first produced, but, as of May 2012, the boards are regularly manufactured. The construction was created by Mullen and the latest version, the Super Uber Light V3, is featured in the Almost Skateboards "Spring 12" catalogue.
- The Impact Support is an 8-ply Resin deck that uses die-cut carbon fiber discs that are inserted in the 8th ply around the truck mounting areas; the discs prevent "pressure cracks" in the areas of a skateboard deck that typically break. The model is lighter and stronger than Almost Resin-7 and 8 decks, and are covered by a 30-day warranty.
- The Double Impact series was released in 2010. The model utilizes carbon fiber discs (such as Impact Support), with Resin-6 construction and a carbon fiber top sheet. The Double Impact design features all the benefits of the Impact Support model, but is lighter and stronger. Almost provides a 45-day warranty with the Double Impact model.

== Contests ==
The first installment of the Almost "Double Impact Contest Series was launched in 2011 as a collaborative event with the Liberty Boardshop. The inaugural contest was held at a public location called the "Brea 12 set" and was held in November 2011—the winning trick was a switch-stance 360-flip.

The second contest was held in August 2012 at the Springfield Skatepark "10-stair" in Oregon, United States, in collaboration with the Tactics skate shop. The prize was a new skateboard every month for the duration of a year. The winner of the Oregon contest was Scott Grady, who landed both a nollie backside heelflip and a switch varial heelflip.

In January 2013, the Europe Impact Tour commenced, featuring demonstration performances from Haslam, Amrani, and Wildgrube. Double Impact contests were incorporated into the tour and on January 16, 2013, the first tour stop occurred in Berlin, Germany at the Skatehalle-Berlin skate park venue. The winner of each round, as per the previous contests, wins a year worth of Almost skateboard decks—at the first stop in Berlin, the winner was photographed with a signature model "Willow" (Wildgrube) skateboard deck.

== Team (as of January 2023) ==
=== Professional ===
- Rodney Mullen
- Youness Amrani
- Yuri Facchini
- Max Geronzi
- Tyson Bowerbank

=== Former ===
- Ryan Sheckler (Zero Skateboards)
- Greg Lutzka (Darkstar Skateboards)
- Torey Pudwill (Plan B Skateboards)
- Lewis Marnell (deceased)
- Chris Haslam (Brainchild Skateboards)
- Daewon Song (Thank You Skateboards)
- John Dilo (Jacuzzi Unlimited)
- Sky Brown
- Mitchie Brusco

=== Amateur ===
- Fran Molina
- Aaron Kim
- Titi Gormit
- Mikel Vidal

=== Locals ===
Through the "Almost Famous" series, the brand introduced the "Almost Locals" for skateboarders who receive Almost skateboard decks to ride, but are not officially listed as team members—the traditional term for this status is "flow."

- Filipp Lepikhin
- Issey Yumiba
- CJ Tambornino
- Jean-Marc Johannes
- Daryl Dominguez
- Micky Mariano Papa
- Christopher Chann

Although Matty "Schmatty" Chaffin appeared in the "flow" section of 5-Incher, he has signed a deal with the DGK ("Dirty Ghetto Kids") skateboard company subsequent to the release of the film (this was publicly confirmed by James Craig, using the avatar "cliff", on the SLAP magazine message board in July 2012). Chaffin was confirmed as a "flow" rider for DGK in a video upload that was released on November 30, 2012, in which he shares apart with Ryan Guiso as they skate Da Playground, an indoor training facility, owned by DGK, that is located in Atlanta, U.S. Chaffin is riding for Mystery Skateboards as of June 30, 2016, where he has been assigned professional status.

=== Staff ===
- Luis Cruz – Brand Manager
- Eric Wollam – Designer
- James Craig – Team Manager

== Videos ==
- Almost: Round Three (2004)
- Almost Cheese & Crackers (2006)
- Almost 5-Incher (2012)

5-Incher was directed by Colin Kennedy (The Berrics) and produced by brand manager Cruz.
