= Video magazine =

Video magazines are a series of videos that follow the print magazine format in which the reader/viewer consumes an issue on a periodic basis. Video magazines differ from traditional online magazine or ezine because they are delivered in a video format and are consumed through viewing online or via home video rather than reading online material.

== History ==
The concept of the video magazine began in the 1980s with low-budget titles such as Flipside Video Fanzine, an adjoining video supplement to the punk fanzine Flipside. By the beginning of the 1990s, the concept had fully cohered and a number of titles were produced by major media organizations in both the United States and Britain. Notable productions were Slammin' Rap Video Magazine published by BMG in 1990, and the video game-orientated Click Video Magazine, produced and released in 1991.

A number of print magazines have mirrored their content on digital video platforms in recent years, and have produced online-only video content in addition to this. One example is WIRED's Autocomplete Interviews.

== Different formats ==
=== Pure video magazines ===
These magazines exist purely in video format and only online, without a print counterpart to support it.

The first magazine to launch in this format was "The I Love Comedy Video Magazine" created by Jack Bensinger, which is currently published through YouTube, launching in July 2016. This was followed with the launch of music lifestyle magazine EWE Zine, in March 2017.

=== Augmented reality video magazines ===
Augmented reality video magazines have a print counterpart to support it. Using apps such as layar and that blends the offline with the online. The first example of this was GUAP magazine which started life a crowd funding project. The magazines uses an app called Layar to make their content interactive, linking to video content elsewhere.

The Exposed is similar to GUAP but instead of using a third-party app to link to its video content, The Exposed has its own native app under the same name. This app blends the offline with the online.

== See also ==
- Online magazines
- Online newspaper
