= Greg Lutzka =

American skateboarder (born 1985)

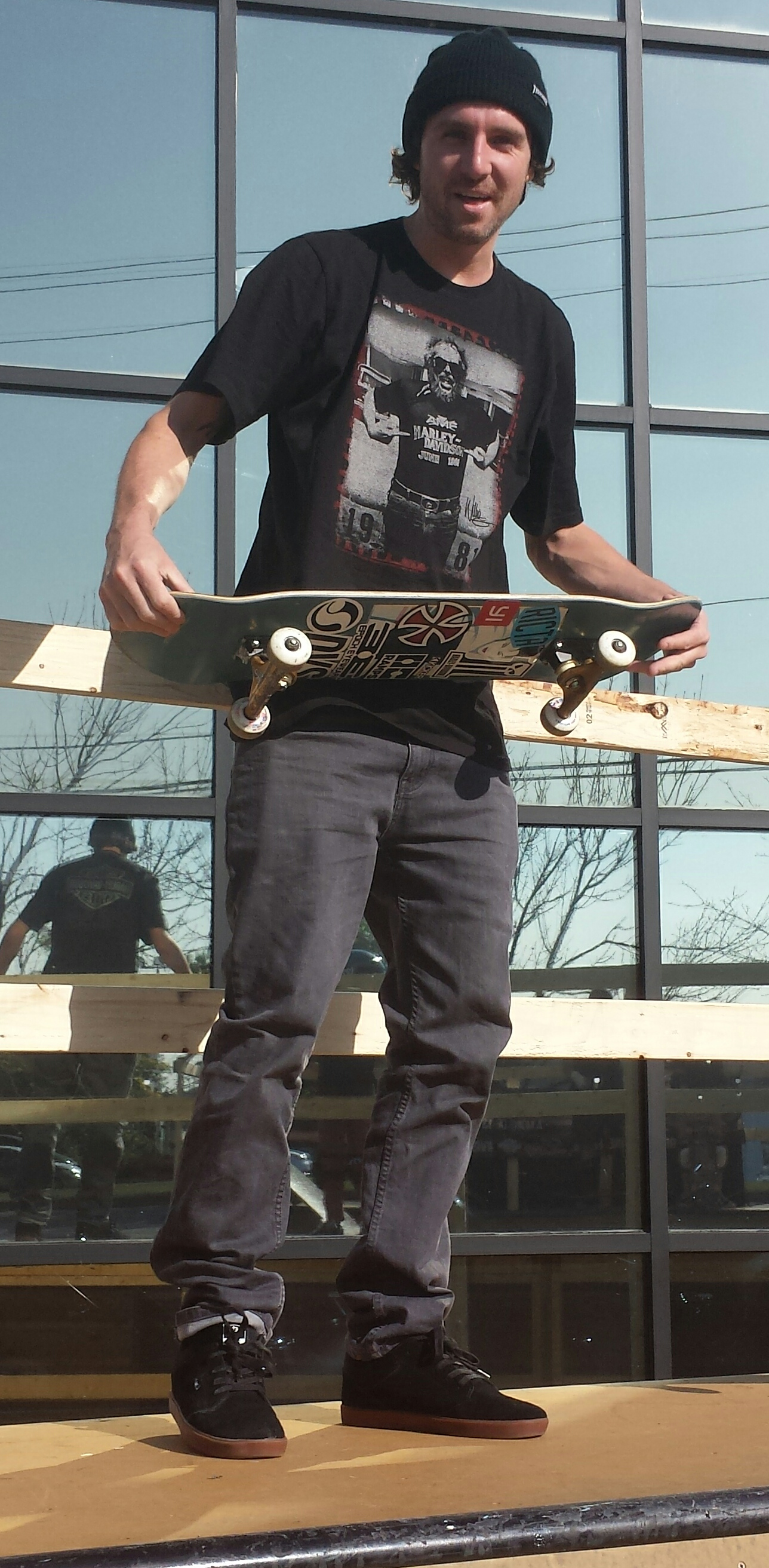
- Lutzka in 2018

Personal information
- Born: Gregory Lutzka; April 20, 1985 (age 40) Milwaukee, Wisconsin, U.S.
- Height: 6 ft 0 in (1.83 m)
- Weight: 140 lb (64 kg)

Sport
- Country: United States
- Sport: Skateboarding
- Position: Goofy

Gregory Lutzka (born April 20, 1985) is an American professional skateboarder.

== Early life ==
Lutzka was born in Milwaukee, Wisconsin, on April 20, 1985. Lutzka explained in 2014 that he "grew up on skates," and first tried ice skating at the age of two before playing ice hockey in high school.

Lutzka commenced skateboarding at the age of nine after discovering it through his peers in the ice hockey team. Skateboarding was initially an activity that he enjoyed as an aside to ice hockey, but three years later, Lutzka replaced ice hockey with skateboarding because he "loved it so much."

== Professional skateboarding ==
Lutzka was first sponsored at the age of 15 and he explained in 2014 that, upon attaining sponsorship, he realized that professional skateboarding was a feasible option for him. Volcom and Oakley were two of the brands that supported Lutzka, while he was connected with established skateboarders like Rodney Mullen and Tony Hawk. Lutzka relocated to California, U.S., at the request of his sponsors.

Lutzka was one of the original team members of the Almost skateboard deck brand that was cofounded by Mullen and Daewon Song.

Luztka is a former team member of the Globe shoe company team and released one signature shoe model with the brand, named the "Culprit" (also released in a "high-top" model, whereby the length of the shoe is extended to cover the lower shin). A full-length Lutzka video part appears in the United By Fate series of short episodic films that were released by Globe between 2007 and 2009—Lutzka's part, edited to the Justice song "D.A.N.C.E.", is the feature section of the fourth episode.

Following the completion of his contract with Globe, Lutzka negotiated a skate shoe contract with tennis shoe company K-Swiss in 2009 and, as of August 2012, continues to develop the company's skateboard area. In an August 2012 interview with the internet-based Jenkem publication, Lutzka explained:

They’re building up the program but the economy kind of took a hit right now so like every company is cutting back. Actually I don’t think they’re cutting back that much as they are just taking time to think about the decisions we make. My shoe is pretty much done it just comes down to when they want to release it.

In addition to changing shoe sponsors, Lutzka left Almost to join the Darkstar company (both brands are part of the same distribution house, Dwindle Distribution). Lutzka explained his decision to change sponsors in an interview with Poweredge Magazine:

Now it’s [Almost] just a lot different than it was then; it’s just a different program now than when I was on there. When I was on there it was me [Ryan] Sheckler and Torey Pudwill. Obviously none of us are there now but to me being on a skateboard company is about who you hang out with and who you vibe with and I vibe with those dudes really well, but I was skating with Ryan Decenzo a lot and we travel a lot together because of the Maloof Cup and the Dew Tour. We also skate street a lot together and film with the same dudes. It was a good fit for me with Darkstar because I hang out with Decenzo and I’ve known Chet [Thomas] because he’s helped me with my career since the beginning, so it was a really good fit. Pierre [PLG] was always at all the events and I’m really good friends with Pierre so at the end of the day I hang out with those dudes more than anybody else in skateboarding, so it works.

An August 12, 2014, edition of Thrasher Magazine's "Skateline" program announced that Lutzka had parted ways with K-Swiss and joined the Osiris Shoes company. While an official announcement from either Osiris or K-Swiss was not published, the Osiris blog first featured Lutzka on June 22, 2014.

In a September 2014 interview, Lutzka offered advice to young skateboarders:

Skateboarding is all about having fun and having fun with your friends; it’s always been that way, and it’ll always be that way. I think that is number one. Some kids just want to get sponsored and become a pro skater, but most of the pros didn’t ever look at it that way. They just did it because they loved it, got really good at it and opportunities just came from that. Number one, to me, is just enjoying skateboarding because you love it.

=== Sponsors ===
As of October 2014, Lutzka is sponsored by Darkstar Skateboards, Kurb Socks, Independent Truck Company, Ricta Wheels, FKD bearings, Osiris Shoes, Rockstar, Kicker, Daphine, Footprint Insoles and OC Ramps.

== Media appearances ==
=== Commercials ===
- Ryan Sheckler AXE Commercial - Double Pits to Chesty

=== Music videos ===
- Far East Movement - Rocketeer ft. Ryan Tedder (views - 33,815,642)
- Shwayze & Cisco - Drunk Off Your Love ft. Sky Blu from LMFAO (views - 626,300)
- Snoop Dogg Ft. The Dream - "Gangsta Luv" (views - 1,487,892)

=== Television ===
- The X-Life
- Life of Ryan
- Discovery Channel Time Warp!: Episode 4 – "Fuel Girls"
- The Price is Right Season 45 Episode 148*
- Wipeout

=== Film ===
- Accepted (2006)

== Entrepreneur ==
Following his move to Osiris Shoes, Lutzka said that he would like to be a sales representative for skateboard brands that he believes in after his skateboarding career ends. Lutzka then revealed in September 2014 that he had started a yet-unnamed clothing company, following advice from sponsors, and was also interested in real estate.

Lutzka partnered with Walmart to create “Learn with Lutzka" skateboards. An affordable entry level complete skateboard for kids looking to get into skateboarding.

== Personal life ==
Lutzka resides in Mission Viejo, California. He moved there in 2004, after living in Milwaukee, Wisconsin, with his mother Lori, father, Jeff, and brother Andy. He explained in 2014 that he enjoys snowboarding and playing guitar when he is not skateboarding. Lutzka concluded his 2014 interview with the statement: "I want to continue to be a good role model. Finally, just enjoy life— people don’t realize how important that is."

== Contest results ==
Following his selection in the initial round of contracts that were offered by the Street League Skateboarding (SLS) skateboard contest company, Lutzka later negotiated a release from SLS as the contract required participants to compete exclusively in SLS events. Following Lutzka's departure, SLS founder Rob Dyrdek stated: "Despite being signed to a three-year agreement we understood that the companies that are willing to pay Greg expect him to win contests. It was clear after the first year that would never happen in Street League, so when Greg asked us to release him we decided it was the right thing to do."

- 2023 - Thrasher Magazine Gangsta of Da Year award - 1st Place
- 2011 - Maloof Money Cup - 1st
- 2008 - Mexico City X Games - 1st / Gold
- 2008 - AST Dew Tour, Portland, OR - 3rd
- 2008 - X Games 14, Los Angeles, CA - Bronze
- 2008 - Tampa Pro, Tampa, FL - Street - 1st
- 2008 - Slaughter at the Opera, Sydney, Australia - Street - 1st
- 2007 - LG Action Sports World Championships, Dallas, TX - Street - Bronze
- 2007 - AST Dew Tour Overall Standing - 2nd
- 2007 - AST Dew Tour, Orlando, FL - Park - 1st
- 2007 - X-Games Mexico, Mexico City - Street - 1st / Gold
- 2007 - AST Dew Tour, Portland, OR - Park - 1st
- 2007 - X Games, Los Angeles, CA - Street - Silver
- 2007 - AST Dew Tour, Baltimore, MD - Park - 2nd
- 2007 - Rockstar MASA Pro, Fayetteville, NC - 1st
- 2006 - AST Dew Tour, San Jose, CA - Street - 2nd
- 2006 - Tampa Pro, Tampa, FL- Street - 1st
- 2005 - AST Dew Action Sports Tour Standing - 3rd
- 2005 - West 49 Canadian Open - 1st
- 2005 - X Games XI - Street - Silver
- 2004 - Street Year-End Ranking (World) - 3rd
- 2004 - Vans Triple Crown Ranking (Street) - 2nd
- 2004 - Gravity Games Street - Silver
- 2004 - Slam City Jam Street - 1st
- 2003 - West 49 Canadian Open Street - 1st
- 2003 - Globe World Championships - Gold

== Videography ==
- 411VM: Issue 49 (2001)
- Digital: Invasion (2002)
- Digital: All Stars (2003)
- Thrasher: King Of The Road 2004 (2004)
- Almost: Round Three (2004)
- Globe: World Cup Skateboarding 2005 (2005)
- Vicious Cycle (2005)
- Streets: Melbourne (2005)
- FKD: FKD Video (2005)
- Red Bull: Seek & Destroy II (2005)
- Oakley: Our Life (2006)
- Globe: The Global Assault (2006)
- 411VM: Volume 14, Issue 1 (2006)
- Strange Notes: The Deuce (2007)
- Thrasher: Money For Blood (2007)
- Globe: United By Fate (2007–2009)
- Streets: LA (2007)
- Transworld: Skate & Create (2008)
- FKD: Park Project Finale (2010)
- Darkstar: Forward Slash (2012)
