= Shiloh Greathouse =

American skateboarder

Shiloh Greathouse is a professional skateboarder based in Los Angeles, California, United States.

== Skateboarding career ==
Greathouse gained prominence in the 1990s skating for World Industries, appearing in the 1993 New World Order skate video. He appeared in many World Industries videos in the early-mid 1990s. Greathouse adorned the cover of the inaugural 1992 issue of Big Brother, a skateboarding magazine. Greathouse made a resurgence with the release of the Transworld Skateboarding video "First Love". His "First Love" video footage was widely considered to be among the best released in 2005.

Greathouse is known for his style and innovation.

Greathouse was formerly employed by Lossa Engineering building custom motorcycles. He lives in the city of Long Beach California, where he now works as a financial advisor and continues to skateboard.
