= Chris Haslam (skateboarder) =

Canadian professional skateboarder (born 1980)

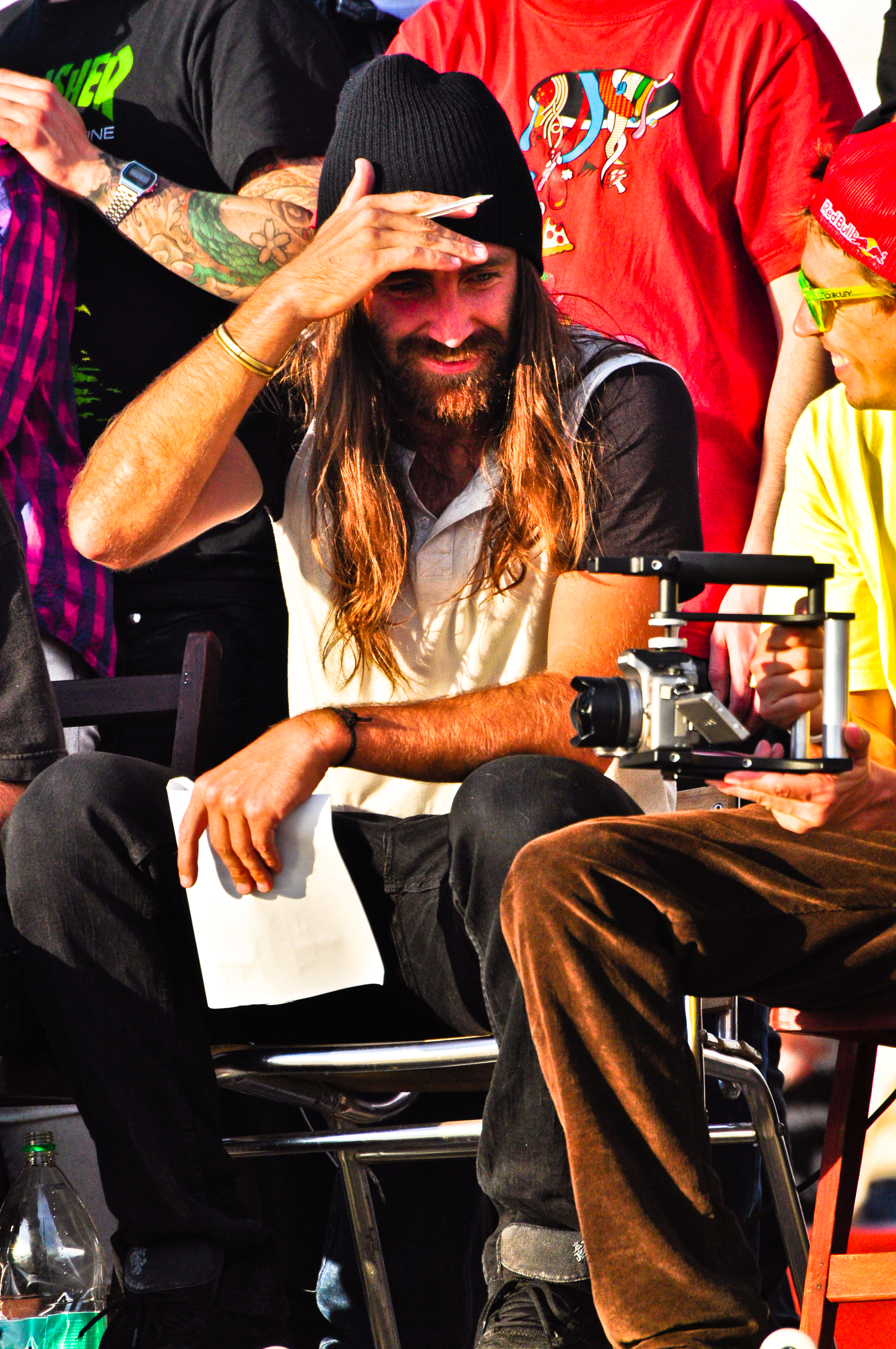
- Chris Haslam in 2011

Personal information
- Born: Chris Haslam; December 19, 1980 (age 45) Niagara Falls, Ontario, Canada

Sport
- Country: Canada
- Sport: Skateboarding

Chris Haslam (born December 19, 1980) is a Canadian professional skateboarder whose natural stance is right foot forward, or 'Goofy'. He is recognized as an innovative skateboarder whose skateboarding is defined by creativity and progression.

== Early life ==
When he was 11 years of age, Haslam relocated to Singapore with his parents. Haslam's family returned to Canada for a year in 1996, living in Komoka, and Haslam attended St. Thomas Aquinas Catholic Secondary School (London, Ontario).

Haslam's interest in skateboarding began in November 1993, prior to his thirteenth birthday, and his first skateboard deck was from the Santa Cruz company. The first skateboard trick that Haslam learned was a kickflip.

While residing in Singapore, Haslam entered his first skateboard contest alongside his brother. The contest was a mini-ramp contest and Haslam eventually achieved fourth place after initially tying for third place with his brother. Haslam explained in an interview: "I think they couldn’t give the trophy out to two dudes though, so I guess they put me in fourth place, so I ended up with that."

== Career ==
Haslam's first ever magazine cover photograph was for the publication, Concrete Powder—the photograph was taken at the University of British Columbia (UBC). Haslam's head was shaved in the image, and he is executing an ollie, a trick in which the skateboard is elevated by manipulating the skateboard deck with the feet only.

Following his promotion to professional status, Haslam received his first signature skateboard model and described the design process in a magazine interview with the SBC Skateboard magazine:

I had two at the same time. One was the rocker dude, who was all white, with pink and blue and had spandex pants on and Van Halen tee ... Then there was another one—the Grizzly Haslam. My friend Mark Anderson wrote up this whole thing on why, for my first graphic, is should be the Grizzly Haslam. He made his own little graphic of this man with a bear and had all these photos of Grizzly Adams and a bear. We weren’t really feeling the board graphic on either of them so we just took one of the photos that he sent us, and it was five or 10 minutes before we had to send it in, so it was like "Shit, what are we going to do?" So we just put it on there, and we had this crazy photo of my face that we shot on there and it looked Photoshopy. I think that was one of my best boards that I ever had, it was pretty sick.

By 1998, Haslam rode for the Boarding House, a skate shop in Vancouver BC run by strong skating locals John Raimondo and Jeff Logan.

After it opened in October 1998, Chris trained extensively at the Richmond skatepark, located near Vancouver International Airport YVR. The park became his primary training location and he quickly became one of its most prominent skaters, known for his skill across both street and transition section of the park.

In 2001, Haslam won Best Trick at Vancouver's Slam City Jam (SCJ) contests at least once, with a one-footed BS Smith grind down a rail in 2001.

Haslam was a team rider for Daewon Song's Deca brand (under the Dwindle Distribution company), and it was with this company that he photographed his first ad, in which he was executing a '360-flip' (similar to a kickflip, but the board spins on two axes) on the loading dock of a warehouse. Haslam was a flow rider for the DC Shoe Company at the time.

Following the demise of Deca, Haslam, alongside Cooper Wilt, was asked by Song to join Song's short-lived, subsequent board company, Artafact (it existed between 2002 and 2003).

Around 2003 he joined Almost Skateboards along with fellow pro skaters, Song (Thrasher magazine's 2006 Skater of the Year), Mullen and Wilt. Soon after joining the new company, Haslam appeared in an "Either/Or" feature for Skateboarder magazine, in which he is photographed by the editor of the publication, Jaime Owens, from mirror-image angles while performing the same trick (the skateboarder was therefore required to perform the trick in both regular and switch stance). Haslam performed a trick called a "Salad grind" on the same handrail that was used by Guy Mariano and Jason Lee in the Blind video, Video Days.

Haslam gained attention and popularity after the debut of the Almost: Round Three video. This was followed in 2006 by the video Cheese and Crackers, in which Haslam and Song showcase their miniramp skills in an abandoned Long Beach, US, warehouse that was formerly a methamphetamine laboratory. It also features Haslam and his teammate Cooper Wilt skating an offroad skateboard. Song stated in 2011 that during the filming of the video, Haslam performed tricks that he had not yet seen (at that time) on a miniramp.

Haslam joined the Globe shoes team in 2006 and was also the star of Globe's United By Fate Part 2 episodic video in August 2007. As of October 2012, Haslam has released two signature shoe models with Globe, "The Sabaton" and "The Odin".

Together with Brandon Biebel and Jose Rojo, among others, Haslam joined the team of the Momentum skateboard wheel company. Professional skateboarder, Rick McCrank, is the owner of the brand, in addition to being a team member. Momentum is distributed by Blitz Distribution (Hook-Ups, Life Extension, Sk8 Mafia). In April 2007, Haslam had a video part in the Momentum wheel company's debut video Un Momentum (Por Favor). While on a 2008 Almost tour in Tasmania, Australia, Haslam was featured in an article in the Sunday Tasmanian newspaper, under the headline, "World's Most Unlikely Hero".

In December 2011, Haslam left Momentum to join the Bones wheel team and a brief video segment was published on the Internet to coincide with the sponsor change—the video depicts Haslam first setting up his board, with the use of his first Bones signature wheels, and then Haslam is shown performing a series of tricks in street environments. Since being sponsored by Bones, Haslam's signature wheels have featured a comic-style caveman design, a chainsaw, and a "lagoon monster".

Haslam received the final part in the 2012 Almost video 5 Incher; the concluding trick in the part is a "rock-to-kickflip-to-fakie" ("fakie" is when the skateboarder rides out of a trick backwards) on a transitional structure. Haslam filmed a video part that is featured in the second Bones full-length video New Ground that was released in February 2013 and featured other team members, such as Moose, Matt Berger, Kevin Romar, and Jordan Hoffart.

Haslam is a playable character in Electronic Art (EA)'s skateboarding video game series skate.

=== Sponsors ===
As of August 2013, Haslam's sponsors are Almost, Independent Trucks, Bones Wheels, Bones Bearings, Turbokolor, Vestal, Dakine, Leftover Hardware, glassy sun haters and Globe.

In April 2017, Haslam announced on his Facebook page he was parting ways with Almost Skateboards and Globe Shoes, saying:

″It has come that time when I must part ways with my comrades at Almost Skateboards and Globe shoes. Can't really put 16 years of thank you's into a measly IG(Instagram) post but....thanks for all the sweet adventures over the years friends✌🏻✌🏻here's to new beginnings″

=== Setup ===
Haslam revealed the skateboard hardware that he utilizes in a December 2012 interview:

- 8.25-inch Almost Double Impact skateboard deck ("It's hard for me to go back to normal plys after this, by the way.")
- Gypsy grip ("... just a small griptape company that me and my buddy started.")
- Leftover hardware ("My buddy started a hardware company called "Leftover Hardware".)
- 149 Independent trucks ("It doesn't matter about the forged baseplate or hollowed axle, kingpin, or any of that stuff—as long as they're high, 149 Independents, then they work for me.")
- Bones bushings ("I use the bones bushing; I think they're medium—whatever the yellow ones are. I use those, they seem to ... work in nicely.")
- 52mm Bones Street Tech Formula (STF) wheels ("The Jeremy Wray ones right now. And on the back heel edge, I usually put a different-colored wheel, just for flair points, but flair points that I can't see; otherwise, it would drive me nuts, you know?")
- Bones Swiss bearings ("I think these are Labyrinths, though, I think ... but, I don't know, Swiss, usually; and they seem to work okay. I don't really change them a lot—I try not to change anything very much.")

== Company owner ==
In July 2012, Haslam released an online video commercial for Leftover Hardware, a company that his close friend founded. Haslam revealed in a December 2012 segment for Alli Sports that he has co-founded a griptape brand with a close friend, entitled "Gypsy Grip".

Haslam announced on his Facebook fan page that Leftover Hardware will release his signature hardware product in September 2013. Entitled "Haslam's Hardware", the product is packaged in a cardboard box and features a drawn image of Haslam in a Viking helmet eating skateboard hardware like breakfast cereal.

Haslam started a deck company named 'Brainchild' in 2019, which donates part of the proceeds from board and shirt sales to Project Semicolon, and the Ben Raemers foundation to help with mental health and suicide prevention. Haslam had started this company partially due to the sad events of Ben Raemers' suicide in May 2019.

== Awards and praise ==
Haslam won the Reader's Choice Award at the 7th Annual Transworld Skateboarding Awards in 2005. In August 2006, he was voted the winner of the Vs 411VM competition.

Song has stated in a voiceover for a "Classics" segment, produced by Thrasher magazine, in which Haslam's footage from the Cheese and Crackers mini-ramp video is featured:

Chris is definitely one of the craziest mini-ramp skaters; I mean, one of the craziest skaters, is just as well ... Chris, always has just been, you know, skatin' with him all the time, just sometimes can't believe the things that he does. And we were skatin' ramps and stuff, so it was pretty fun to just do a project like this with him, 'cause I knew that he was definitely going to do some crazy stuff. Ah, it's weird too, 'cause he would, ah, he would have to leave and go to, like, different places ... I mean he would have to, like, go on trips and then go back home [Vancouver, Canada] for a while and he'd come back, so, he hammered out a lot of this stuff pretty quick. He had so much footage; he got so much stuff so fast ... ah, I don't know if it's, what it is out, people from out that way just seem to be able to do everything—and, ah, Chris is definitely one of those guys. So, like I said, it was insane. And it was fun ...

== Musical projects ==
In 2008 Haslam joined the metal band Kobra Triangle as a bass guitar player, but the band later disbanded (date unknown). Professional skateboarder Jose Rojo revealed in an online interview that, as of July 2012, he is a member of a band that includes Haslam.

== Videography ==
- Skate Canada 6 (Unknown)
- Deca: Second to None (2001)
- Digital - Fajsha (2003)
- Thrasher: King Of The Road 2004 (2004)
- BARRIER KULT : HORDE I "2004" *
- Almost: Almost: Round Three (2004)
- 411VM: Volume 13, Issue 2 (2005)
- 411VM: Volume 14, Issue 4 (2006)
- Almost: Cheese and Crackers (2006)
- Strange Notes: Ozfest (2006)
- Strange Notes: NY To Shanghai (2006)
- Globe: United By Fate (UBF) (2007)
- Momentum: Uno Momentum Por Pavor (2007)
- Thrasher: Money For Blood (2007)
- Momentum: Japan Tour (2008)
- Transworld: Skate & Create (2008)
- Independent: 30th Anniversary Tour (2008)
- Fuel TV: Riding the Long White Cloud (2009)
- Dakine: Tiki Tour (2009)
- Independent: Euro Tour (2009)
- Momentum: Yo Llama! Llama! (2011)
- Thrasher: Double Rock: Almost (2011)
- Thrasher: Double Rock: Globe (2012)
- Almost: 5-Incher (2012)
