= Dwindle Distribution =

American skateboard distributor

- Industry: Skateboarding
- Founders: Steve Rocco; Rodney Mullen
- Headquarters: El Segundo, California, United States
- Products: Skateboards
- Parent: Transom Capital Group
- Website: dwindle.com

Dwindle Distribution is an American skateboarding distributor based in El Segundo, California. It is a component of Transom Capital Group Limited. The company was founded by Steve Rocco and Rodney Mullen. Its formation is recognized as a key event in the creation of a skateboard company owned by people actively involved in the skateboarding lifestyle.

== History ==
While professional skateboarder Rodney Mullen was still a sponsored rider for the Powell-Peralta "Bones Brigade" team, Steve Rocco convinced Mullen to join him in the further development of what would become the first skater-owned skateboard company, World Industries. Mullen was forced to leave his place at Powell-Peralta as a result. He was also persuaded to continue professional skateboarding in the face of the declining popularity of his foundational discipline, freestyle skateboarding. Rocco has stated in an online documentary: "To me a business partner was anybody that, you know, just had excess cash, gullibility, and, ah, absenteeism—Rodney had all of those, and, ah, he bought out John Lucero for six thousand dollars and became a partner."

Globe International operates its own factory to manufacture the skateboards and trucks that it distributes under Dwindle. The DSM (Douglas Street Manufacturing) Premium Woodshop is located in Shenzhen, China, with Rodney Mullen closely involved in production practices from its inception. DSM imports maple logs from Canada's Great Lakes region for the production of wooden skate decks. A 2013 TransWorld SKATEboarding article likened DSM's approach to the sourcing and treatment of wood: “as the sandwich shop that prepares all of their meat from the whole animal versus others who order their cuts from a wholesaler, DSM has the in-house butcher.”

DSM was first publicly announced in 2003 and caused a widespread surprised reaction in the skateboard industry, as production had previously been solely based in North America; concern was raised about job losses. Globe International CEO Matt Hill stated at the time: "When you get down to the labor issues, if we sell a lot more boards, then we'll create jobs here (in the U.S.A.), it'll open a lot more doors.”

In 2015, Dwindle and Globe published the book Unemployable: 30 Years of Hardcore, Skate and Street which included a chapter on Dwindle's history. Launches were held in Melbourne and Los Angeles.

== Black Box Distribution ==
In 2014, skateboard distributor Black Box Distribution, owned by skateboarder Jamie Thomas, was dissolved and some of its brands were transferred to Dwindle. In a June 2014 interview with the Jenkem online publication, Thomas explained that Dwindle would take over "the sales, finance, production and distribution aspects" of the Zero Skateboards and Fallen Footwear brands. Thomas further explained that the brands' employees would remain independent and focus on "the team, marketing and creative aspects" of the brands.

== Management ==
As of April 2014, Hugh "Bod" Boyle is the president of Dwindle Distribution, and Steve Douglas is the vice president—both are former professional skateboarders. Globe International sold Dwindle in 2019.

== Brands ==
Current

As of April 2021, the company distributes the following skateboard brands:

- Almost
- Enjoi
- Daylight
- Tensor Trucks
- Blind
- Darkstar
- Dusters
- Madness
- New Deal
- 101 Heritage
- Andalé Bearings

Former

- A-Team (founded by Rodney Mullen)
- Deca (founded by Daewon Song)
- City Stars (founded by Kareem Campbell)
- World Industries
- Fallen Footwear
