= Steve Berra =

American skateboarder

- Born: May 10, 1973 (age 53); Omaha, Nebraska, U.S.
- Occupations: Skateboarder, film director, screenwriter, actor
- Spouse: Juliette Lewis (m. 1999; div. 2003)
- Children: 2
- Website: theberrics.com

Steve Berra (born May 10, 1973) is an American professional skateboarder and director, and is also the cofounder/co-owner of the skateboarding website The Berrics.

== Early life ==
Berra grew up in both Nebraska and Missouri and he explained in 2007 that his family was poor: "I was considered poor when I was growing up. I didn't have a phone." Berra was bullied at school for skateboarding and struggled as a student, with Berra stating that he "was the kid who everybody assumed was a complete lost cause." It was at the age of 14 years that the isolated Berra, who had a small number of friends at the time, decided that a professional skateboarding career was his aspiration.

== Skateboarding career ==
In pursuit of his skateboarding career, Berra relocated to southern California, US when he was 18 years old and lived with skateboarding legend Tony Hawk. Hawk provided guidance to Berra regarding the skateboarding industry and advised, "You have to look at skating as fun. But it's not a career," due to the subculture's marginal status at the time.

Berra's first sponsor was Blockhead, which led to his experience with the "Blockhead House", where he met fellow skateboarder Jason Dill. He then moved onto the 101 skateboard brand, owned by Natas Kaupas, and he has since stated that "I didn't have a good time on 101". Before Kaupas could assign Berra the status of a "professional" team rider, Berra quit 101 and joined Tony Hawk's Birdhouse company. While with Birdhouse, the 23-year-old Hawk was a mentor figure to Berra, leading to Berra's initial forays into acting. In 1992, Berra left Birdhouse and since admitted that his departure was due to being "young, misunderstood, and silly". Several months later, Berra joined the Foundation team, skating in the company's 1993 video Super Conductor Super Collider.

In 1998 Berra returned to Birdhouse to create the skateboarding video The End. In one of the notable scenes in the movie, Berra's death is simulated in a decapitation scene (filmed with the aid of a dummy).

Shortly after the release of The End Berra once again left Birdhouse and joined Alien Workshop, alongside Dill and professionals such as Josh Kalis and Rob Dyrdek.

In 2003 Berra struggled with severe ankle pain that prevented him from skating for most of the year and he underwent reconstructive surgery in January 2004. Footage of Berra entering ankle surgery is featured in the DVS Shoes (formerly DVS Shoe Co.) video, Skate More, a production that he managed to film a full part for.

Berra has been featured in MTV shows Rob & Big and Rob Dyrdek's Fantasy Factory. Season 2, Episode 6 of Rob & Big revolves around the Tampa Pro professional skateboarding contest, whereby Berra and Dyrdek engage in a US$5,000 bet to "up the ante" of the competition. In Season 2, Episode 8 of Rob Dyrdek's Fantasy Factory, entitled "The Berrics vs. Fantasy Factory", Dyrdek's Fantasy Factory skate park crew competes against The Berrics crew.

As of 2013, Berra regularly appears on the website venture The Berrics that is co-owned with professional skateboarder Eric Koston. As of March 2013, Berra is no longer a member of the Alien Workshop team and his sponsors are DC Shoes, Grizzly Griptape, Skullcandy, and The Berrics.

== The Berrics ==
The Berrics concept was primarily conceived by Berra, who enlisted close friend, Koston, to invest in the premises that contains the training facility. Located in Los Angeles, U.S., the facility's name is an amalgamation of the pair's individual names: Berra + Eric = Berrics. In 2009, skateboarding journalist, Chris Nieratko, gained entrance to the skate park and its cardinal rule: "You have to film while you're skating The Berrics." The footage is later posted on The Berrics website, TheBerrics.com. TheBerrics.com grew to become one of skateboarding's most popular websites in only several months: "In January, the site had more unique visitors than sites for all of the major skateboarding magazines, and ESPN.com's action sports page, according to comScore, a market research firm."

The website features a range of weekly, regular, and special features, including "Weekendtage", "Bangin'", "Battle at the Berrics", "Field Ops", and "Off the Grid". Berra has also used the website to feature colleagues and friends from the fields of film, advertising, and music.

== Perspectives on skateboarding ==
Berra is well known for his public opinions on skateboarding, and in a February 2013 interview with Jenkem magazine he explained his view on the status of the skateboarding industry at the commencement of the second decade of the 21st century:

The economy is a huge challenge. There is only so much money in our industry and it is a very, very, very small industry. Skateboarding may mean everything to you and I and whoever is reading this but we are a small industry with a few examples of companies that have breached into the "real" world and sometimes give us the impression that we are bigger than what we are. There is a vast difference between the sales of Element and the sales of Expedition. The Berrics obstacles have been trying to get people to understand that things have changed, the world has changed, the skater and the consumer have changed. So… it was either we start it, Eric and I, or Google does.

Berra also explained the manner in which the industry is often misperceived and how the economic conditions in the U.S.—at the time of the Jenkem interview—have affected the culture of skateboarding:

We're all squirrels fighting for the same nuts in the worst economy in 100 years and everyone has it tough right now. I don't think people outside the industry understand that. I think a lot of these people who criticize the industry definitely don't understand that. They see these pillars of the skateboarding world and they equate them to the pillars of other worlds that are much bigger than ours not knowing that some are one bad month from closing their doors. Skateboarding companies are skin and bones operations. Popularity does not mean wealth in this industry.

== Directing ==
In the winter of 2006, Berra began his role as director of The Good Life, a film that he also wrote the screenplay for. Starring Mark Webber, Zooey Deschanel, Bill Paxton, Harry Dean Stanton, Chris Klein, Patrick Fugit, Drea de Matteo and Donal Logue, The Good Life was described by Berra in the following manner: "... it had been my ‘other woman’ for many years, but because of my commitments as a professional skateboarder I couldn't pursue it 100%." The film, described as "a coming-of-age tale set in Lincoln, Nebraska, portrayed as a grim town of vacant lots, shuttered buildings, sidewalk drug dealers and deep poverty, all accented by overcast skies", premiered at the 2007 Sundance Film Festival and garnered a positive reception.

Following the commencement of a new chapter of the Berrics project in early 2013, whereby a new premises was officially opened and the website was reconstructed, Berra has collaborated with professional skateboarder Paul Rodriguez on numerous projects, such as the Network A series "LIFE" and a Mountain Dew commercial entitled "Progression".

== Acting ==
Berra has maintained an interest in acting since the age of 18. He was a series regular on the short-lived Fox drama 413 Hope St., portraying Quentin Jefferson, a young man infected with HIV. Berra has also held brief roles in the television shows Felicity and Nash Bridges, as well as a minor role in the 1999 film Anywhere but Here.

Since the age of 18, Berra has juggled his interests in skateboarding and acting, although he maintains that skateboarding has always been his primary passion.

== Personal life ==
Prior to the launch of the Berrics website, Berra explained the impact of Scientology upon his life:

Well, it's just helped me as an individual. I understand life much better and when you understand life, you have an easier time understanding other aspects of it, skateboarding included. I don't claim to be perfect, far from it in fact, but I at least have the self awareness to know that and see upon where I can improve, see where I've been the architect of my doom. Scientology has enabled me to really look at who I am, what I am doing and put myself in check if it I get too crazed. The best way I can further help people understand it is by telling them to actually go and buy a book. It's what I did.

As of August 15, 2013, Berra has not been filmed with his two children on the Berrics, or any other media, but he responded to a fatherhood question in 2009 in the following manner:

It's tough [being a father] sometimes because you go through a lot of heartbreak as a kid and then when you think you've grown out of it, you have a child of your own and you go through it all over again. You also have expectations that are sometimes unrealistic, you have heartache with them not liking you, you have heartache as a result of their heartache, but on the flipside you have this indescribable joy and connection with another person that you just don't have with anyone else and you have a real sense of achievement and pride when they turn out to be an extraordinary individual.

Steve Berra claims to have never drunk alcohol, smoked cigarettes or taken other recreational drugs.

== Filmography ==
- Blockhead: Adventures In Cheese (1990)
- Blockhead: Splendid Eye Torture (1990)
- Tracker: Stacked (1991)
- Birdhouse Projects: Feasters (1992)
- 411VM: Issue 1 (1993)
- 411VM: Issue 5 (1994)
- Airwalk Skateboard Video (1996)
- Transworld: 4 Wheel Drive (1996)
- 411VM: Europe 1996 (1996)
- Transworld: Interface (1997)
- Transworld: Cinematographer (1997)
- Birdhouse: The End (1998)
- 411VM: Issue 41 (2000)
- Transworld: Anthology (2000)
- 411VM: Tampa 2000 (2000)
- Tony Hawk's Gigantic Skatepark Tour (2001)
- 411VM: Issue 48 (2001)
- Transworld: Starting Point 3 (2001)
- 411VM: Best Of 411, Volume 7 (2001)
- Chomp On This (2002)
- 411VM: Issue 50 (2002)
- 411VM: Around The World (2002)
- Habitat: Mosaic (2003)
- DVS: Skate More (2005)
- DVS: Dudes Dudes Dudes (2008)
- Alien Workshop: Mind Field (2009)
