= The Berrics =

Private indoor skatepark

- Type: Skatepark, website
- Founded: December 7, 2007
- Founder: Steve Berra, Eric Koston
- Headquarters: 2535 East 12th Street; Los Angeles, California, United States
- Website: theberrics.com

The Berrics is a private indoor skatepark owned by the professional skateboarders Steve Berra and Eric Koston. It is also a website providing content filmed in the skatepark, as well other skateboard-related media. The facility's name is a portmanteau of the owners' names (the "Ber" of Berra's surname and the "ric" of Koston's first name).

== History ==
=== Establishment: 2007–2011 ===
In an interview with Pop magazine, Berra revealed that prior to the launch of The Berrics, he had been offered a million-dollar deal to direct a film based on a screenplay that he had written. Due to filming commitments for his skateboard deck sponsor, Alien Workshop, Berra declined the offer and later commenced work on The Berrics concept following a period of reflection:

All I wanted to do is I knew we have this hook because there were a lot of kids that always would ask Eric and I about our building. “Someday I'll come to your skate park,” everywhere, all over the world.

That was minimal exposure of it. I realized we were on to something, like a Studio 54, and I was sitting there one day as I was skating and I think it was Andrew Reynolds that I'd seen do a heel flip backside tailslide on the ledge. It was so perfect and awesome. I never left Nebraska mentally to a degree, like I'm still a fan of anyone who skates incredible, ends up just skating.

So if a kid from Nebraska could see how being on this side of the baker's window, if he could see what goes on here and how we make the bread, and what temperature we cook the bread at, they would be psyched. I just started coming up with ideas of what we could do.

Berra and Koston both purchased a building for the skateboarding facility with their own funds; one of the key initial goals for the Berrics facility was to provide a setting where skateboarders could practice their tricks to avoid spending that time in street-based environments in California, where skateboarding is illegal in most spaces.

Following the website's inception in late 2007, it quickly grew and, according to The Wall Street Journal, in January 2009, the Berrics attracted more unique visitors than the websites of every major skateboard magazine, as well as ESPN.com's action sports section.

Rob Dyrdek's Fantasy Factory was inspired by the Berrics and, in 2012, Dyrdek challenged the Berrics crew and lost, thus having to erect a statue that portrayed the inspiration that he had derived from the Berrics facility.

First address:
684 S. Myers street
Los Angeles, CA

=== La Jolla Group partnership: 2011–2012 ===
On February 11, 2011, a press release announced a partnership between the La Jolla Group (LJG) and The Berrics. The Berrics was the first skate category for the LJG, as the company had previously only worked with surf and moto brands. Berra stated in the press release:

With the resources that have been available to us so far, our own pocketbooks, I think we’ve done a fantastic job. When given the opportunity to partner with someone like La Jolla Group, take advantage of their infrastructure, still retain full control and ownership of our company, not have to worry about them having skate brands that compete with our advertisers AND get the job done was something we couldn't pass on. We want to see skateboarding and the people who make it happen, from top to bottom, do better, especially in these tumultuous times.

However, as of November 2013, the Berrics is no longer featured on the LJG website as a licensed brand.

=== New premises: 2012 onward ===
On December 7, 2012, the website was closed and a temporary page was displayed to visitors—the headline was "RIP The Berrics (12/7/07–12/7/12)" and instead of the standard "Enter The Berrics" option, visitors could instead click on a button that read "Exit the Berrics". The page also featured a short video segment of several skateboarders, including Billy Marks, performing tricks in the facility, followed by a firecracker explosion at the base of one of the stair sets. When the "Exit the Berrics" button was clicked on, a second video appeared, featuring professional skateboarder, Felipe Gustavo, performing a series of tricks on one of the ledges in the park.

Prior to December 7, 2012, a series of brief video segments, entitled "Disclosure", were presented on the website over a period of approximately two months. All of the videos were deliberately blurry and, while the name of the skateboarder in the video was revealed, it was difficult for the viewer to properly see where the skateboarder was performing the one or two tricks that would appear. Featured skateboarders included Daewon Song, Nyjah Huston, Kenny Hoyle, Ishod Wair, Matt Miller, and Kelly Hart.

On December 8, 2012, The Berrics was relaunched and the "RIP" page was replaced by a page featuring helmet camera footage from professional skateboarder, Chad Muska, who reveals that he is inside a new Berrics facility—beneath the video frame was a button that read "Enter The New Berrics". Upon entering the new website, the producers of The Berrics revealed that a new facility had been built and a video segment was featured, in which Koston introduces the new Berrics with the assistance of other skateboarders, such as Shane O'Neill, Ronnie Creager, Derrick Wilson, Danny Montoya, Josh Murphy, Marquise Henry, and Clint Peterson.

In the days following, another video segment was uploaded to the website, revealing that the new facility had been built by the California Skateparks company and that Berra had taken photos of actual street/city-based locations that he would like to replicate inside the new facility during the design stage. A video entitled "Full Disclosure" was also released around the same time and featured a compilation of the previous "Disclosure" clips, but without the blurred effect, and with the inclusion of additional footage.

Veteran skateboard photographer Grant J. Brittain confirmed on October 7, 2014, that the Skateboard Mag publication, of which he is a photo editor for, has reached a collaborative agreement with the Berrics. Brittain published the announcement on his Instagram account: "We started a new endeavor, the Skateboard Mag is under The Berrics skateboarding umbrella."

== Segments ==
Since inception, the website has developed a range of features consisting of regularly uploaded episodes that are featured in a section entitled "Daily Ops" (the equivalent of a "News" section for most websites). New episodes of some features are uploaded weekly, while others are uploaded as they are completed.

=== Weekly ===
- "Yoonivision"
- "Gram Yo Selfie" (formerly "Text Yo'self Before You Wreck Yo'Self")
- "Bangin'"
- "Mikey Days"
- "Wednesdays with Reda"
- "First Try Fridays"
- "Instagrams of the Week (IOTW)"
- "VHS (Visual History Selection)"

A segment entitled "VHS (Visual History Selection)" was launched on November 18, 2012 and featured Koston's video part in the Chocolate video, The Chocolate Tour, from 1999. Since inception, the segment has featured video parts from skateboarding history that the website considers significant.

On January 22, 2013, a new segment, "Instagrams of the Week (IOTW)", was launched by Berra as a replacement for an earlier segment; Berra wrote in his introduction:

This is the new version of EOTW [Emails of the Week], only better. Every week we are going to pick our favorite Instagram photos with #berrics and feature them on the site. So, ask questions, make statements, show us a skate spot or a trick we've never seen. Is there a sunset that's just so beautiful you can't possibly imagine the Berrics and everyone that goes on it not seeing it? Then show us.

=== Regular ===
- "Off the Grid"
- "For the Record"
- "Field Ops"
- "Est."

=== Special ===
- "YOUnited Nations"
- "Shoot All Skaters"
- "Battle Commander"
- "Recruit"
- "Weekendtage"
- "Interrogated"

In the lead-up to the official publication of a Battle Commander by Jamie Thomas, the website launched a new type of special segment, entitled "Interrogation". On January 29, 2013, visitors of the website were asked to "send him any questions and/or comments you want". Paul Rodriguez was the second interview subject for the segment.

== Maintenance ==
The skatepark has undergone a significant level of maintenance and rejuvenation during the life of its existence. Berra provided an explanation of a renovation plan as part of a series of short video segments, filmed for the DVS Shoe company four years after the launch of the website:

The park has taken a beating over the last four years, with the amount of people that have skated here ... So, we are getting ready to tear out all the concrete, to the dirt, and redo it so that there's no more cracks. When we originally bought the building, it had a real rough surface; so, when I talked to a bunch of concrete guys, you know, they suggested tearing it out and another guy suggested, "Why don't we pour a slab right on top?" So Eric [Koston] and I paid a whole lot of money to pour this slab on top, 'cause we thought it'd be the easiest and we thought it would be durable. We were wrong.

== Contests ==
=== Battle at the Berrics ===
==== Battle at the Berrics ====
In 2008, skateboard brand, DVS Shoe Company (now DVS Shoes), sponsored the inaugural Battle at the Berrics contest. Consisting of a professional game of S.K.A.T.E., the competition involved thirty-two skaters competing in a bracket-style tournament. The competitors included Steve Berra, Eric Koston, Rob Dyrdek, Andrew Reynolds, Mike Carroll, Marc Johnson, Erik Ellington, PJ Ladd, Danny Montoya, Chris Roberts, Donovan Strain, and Sean Malto.

First place was attained by Mike Mo Capaldi, with second and third place given to Benny Fairfax and Billy Marks, respectively.

==== Battle at the Berrics 2 ====
Battle at the Berrics 2, the second installment of Battle at the Berrics, allowed the Berrics' viewership to vote for thirty-two of more than 150 skateboarders, with the most popular invited to fill the tournament's 32 competitor slots; the two most popular selections were Chris Cole and Daewon Song. Competitors included Kelly Hart, Chris Haslam, Torey Pudwill, Jimmy Carlin, Greg Lutzka, Stefan Janoski, David Gonzalez, Kenny Anderson, Lucas Puig, Heath Kirchart, Jerry Hsu, Dennis Busenitz, Peter Ramondetta, and Mike Vallely, among others.

Battle at the Berrics 2 was won by Chris Cole, who defeated Paul Rodriguez, with Cory Kennedy achieving third place.

==== Battle at the Berrics 3 ====
Battle at the Berrics 3 commenced in 2010 and was sponsored by the DC Shoes company. The competition followed the same format as the previous versions and opened with a match between Cole and Joey Brezinski. The list of competitors included Danny Garcia, Johnny Layton, Gilbert Crockett, Caesar Fernandez, Benny Fairfax, Josiah Gatlyn, Brandon Biebel, Mark Appleyard, Shane O'Neill, and Marty Murawski.

Battle at the Berrics 3 was won by Rodriguez, after defeating Ladd, and O'Neill finished in third place. In a match that lasted nearly seven minutes, Rodriguez managed to win the series after making a considerable comeback effort; the final match was judged by Tony Hawk.

==== Battle at the Berrics IV ====
Battle at the Berrics IV, the fourth installment in the series, was launched in 2011 and was subtitled "U.S. vs. THEM,"—the theme of the competition stipulated that American skateboarders would compete against riders from the rest of the world. The first round of the competition involved sixteen skateboarders from the United States (US) competing against sixteen skateboarders from foreign countries, such as Brazil (Rodrigo Tx, Luan Oliveira, Danillo Cerezini, Felipe Gustavo), the United Kingdom (Fairfax), Canada (Morgan Smith, Wade Desarmo, Mark Appleyard), Colombia (David Gonzalez), Germany (Willow, Alex Mizurov, Lem Villemin), Sweden (Albert Nyberg), Australia (Shane O'Neill), Spain (Enrique Lorenzo), and the Netherlands (Sewa Kroetkov).

Battle at the Berrics IV was won by Morgan Smith (Canada), after he defeated Ladd (U.S.), with Davis Torgerson (U.S.) in third place.

==== Battle at the Berrics V ====
Battle at the Berrics V, the fifth installment in the series, was subtitled "Team Berra vs Team Koston" and was launched in February 2012—sixteen skateboarders were selected to compete as part of Berra and Koston's respective teams. The selection of the teams was released in a video segment published on the Berrics website that featured Berrics host, Steezus Christ, overseeing Berra and Koston as they selected names according to turn. The teams for Battle at the Berrics V were as follows:

Team Koston: Paul Rodriguez, Davis Torgeson, Tom Asta, Marquise Henry, PJ Ladd, Manny Santiago, Sean Malto, Trent McClung, Ishod Wair, Felipe Gustavo, Keelan Dadd, Tommy Fynn, Torey Pudwill, Evan Smith, Morgan Smith, and Moose.

Team Berra: Chris Cole, Shane O'Neill, Billy Marks, Ryan Decenzo, Jimmy Carlin, Sebo Walker, Ryan Pearce, Boo Johnson, Corey Kennedy, Matt Miller, Nyjah Huston, Ronnie Creager, Kevin Romar, Nick Tucker, Mikemo Capaldi, and Theotis Beasley.

Battle at The Berrics 5 was won by Ladd, after he defeated Capaldi, with O'Neill placing third.

==== Battle at the Berrics 6 ====
Battle at the Berrics 6, the sixth installment in the series, will be played according to the theme of "goofy versus regular", a reference to the stance of a skateboarder—that is, "goofy" is the name given to riders who place their right foot at the front of the board while skateboarding, and "regular" is the opposite stance. A promotional video was published on the Berrics website on January 9, 2013, featuring Koston, Johan Stuckey, and Jamie Thomas—the video commences with a spoof skit, in which Koston and Stuckey compete is a joke version of the sixth Battle, and then ends with the official announcement, whereby Thomas and Koston are seemingly the contestants in the first round.

On January 12, 2013, a video entitled, "Battle at the Berrics 6: Regular vs Goofy", was uploaded to the Berrics website—the question, "Who do you want to see at the Battle of the Berrics 6?", featured at the beginning of the segment and skateboarders, both sponsored and unsponsored, provided their responses to the question. The video concluded with the statement: "Check back on Monday to see who made it in".

On January 14, 2013, a video was published on the Berrics, revealing the contestants in the sixth installment of Battle at the Berrics. Presented by Berra, the video revealed that "thousands" of people across Southern California, US had been asked about who they would like to see in the competition during the two weeks prior to the announcement. The final selection of skateboarders was then shown, with corresponding footage for each individual—the skateboarder's board sponsor appears in parentheses:

- Team Regular: Chaz Ortiz (Zoo York), Brad Cromer (Krooked), Moose (Deathwish), Bastien Salabanzi (Drool), Keelan Dadd (DGK), Billy Marks (Toy Machine), Tom Asta (Mystery), Johnny Layton (Toy Machine), Carlos Ribeiro (Chocolate), PJ Ladd (Plan B), Nick Tucker (Expedition), Torey Pudwill (Plan B), Chris Cole (Zero), Keels (Toy Machine), Cory Kennedy (Girl), Mike Mo Capaldi (Girl), and Austyn Gillette (Habitat)
- Team Goofy: Shane O'neill (Skate Mental), Jereme Rogers (Selfish), Nyjah Huston (Element), Trent McClung (Element), Davis Torgerson (Real), Morgan Smith (Blind), Eric Koston (Girl), Dennis Busenitz (Real), Ishod Wair (Real), Wes Kremer (Sk8 Mafia), Manny Santiago (AMMO), Sewa Kroetkov (Blind), Felipe Gustavo (Plan B), David Gonzalez (Flip), Matt Miller (Expedition), and Paul Rodriguez (Plan B)

The final four competitors were O'neill, Capaldi, Rodriguez, and Ladd, with the latter two qualifying for the grand final. Ladd defeated Rodriguez in the championship battle and won the competition for a second successive year. As of June 1, 2013, the Wall Street Journal was the only mainstream media outlet to cover the finals event.

==== Battle At The Berrics 7 ====
'Pros VS Joes' was the name of the 7th installment of BATB. 16 amateur skateboarders were chosen and on March 15, 2014, the first battle of Round 1 had begun. Fox Weekly has released its predictions for BATB7 stating that the final Joe 'will be between Cody Cepeda, Nick Holt or Will Fyock'.

The Grand Final, between Luan Oliveira (Pro) and Cody Cepeda (Joe), was won by Cepeda, who did not acquire a single letter in the Championship Battle. Eric Koston defeated Sewa Kroetkov in the battle for third place.

==== Battle At The Berrics 8 ====
The eighth installment of the Battle at the Berrics concluded with Tom Asta, Sewa Kroetkov, Shane O'Neill, and Cody Cepeda competing on Finals Night. The final match was between Kroetkov and O'Neill. Kroetkov won the Roshambo and never failed a trick, winning with a rarely-seen Hardflip Late Frontside 180 and securing his first Battle at the Berrics victory.

==== Battle at the Berrics 9 ====
The ninth installment of the Battle at the Berrics was entitled "New Blood" and included a roster of skaters that had never previously skated in the contest. Diego Najera, Michael Sommer, Micky Papa and Youness Amrani ended up making it to Finals Night, with Najera and Papa making it to the final match. Najera won the final battle on a switch front side 360 kickflip, while Amrani finished in third place.

==== Battle at the Berrics X ====
Battle at the Berrics X was entitled "Best of the Best," and included a roster of the "best" skaters from previous years' battles. Chris Joslin met BATB8 champion Sewa Kroetkov in the finals. Controversy ensued when Kroetkov called a do-over on his own Frontside Double Flip after a minor toe-drag and subsequently missed his second attempt, putting Joslin on offense. In a close battle, Joslin won with a Switch Frontside Shove-It Late Flip to take the championship, with Joslin and the audience commending Kroetkov on his sportsmanship. Shane O'Neill defeated Nick Tucker in the third place match.

==== Battle at the Berrics 11 ====
Battle at the Berrics 11 introduced a new rule: each skater was given one challenge they could use if they disagreed with a call by the referee. Before the battle, Mike Mo Capaldi and Chris Roberts picked teams, and the battle was loosely structured as a fight between the two teams. On finals night, Luan Oliveira defeated Sewa Kroetkov and Chris Joslin defeated Tom Asta in the semifinals. Kroetkov won the third place match, defeating Asta. Luan Oliveira (a member of team 'Crob') defeated Joslin in the finals, and was crowned champion at Battle at the Berrics 11.

==== WBATB - Women's Battle at the Berrics ====
On September 29, 2019 the first WBATB was announced. The brackets will consist of female pros/ams along with skaters hand picked from Instagram clips using the hash tag #whoisinwbatb.

==== Battle at the Berrics 12 ====
Battle at the Berrics 12 was announced on June 14, 2021 and for the first time will double the size of the bracket from 32 skaters, to 64. The theme includes 4 segments. Pros - Joes - Influencers - Icons. The finals night was held on 21 June 2022, with Sewa Kroetkov (Pro), Tyler Peterson (Joe), Jamie Griffin (Influencer) & Paul Rodriguez (Icon) being the finalists. Before the finals, Rodriguez tested positive for COVID-19 and was replaced by Chris Cole. Griffin won the tournament by defeating Peterson in the finals, with Kroetkov placing third, and Cole placing fourth.

==== Battle at the Berrics 13 ====
Battle at the Berrics 13:Freedom took place in 2023 and was the last BATB held in the current building. Jamie Griffin won for a second year in a row, something that had not been done since PJ Ladd's victories. Nick Holt took second place and Chris Cole took fourth for the second year in a row.

==== Year-by-year results ====
Year	1st Place	2nd Place	3rd Place	Finals night
2008 (BATB)	Mike Mo Capaldi (USA)	Benny Fairfax (GBR)	Billy Marks (USA)	PJ Ladd (USA)
2009 (BATB 2)	Chris Cole (USA)	Paul Rodriguez (USA)	Cory Kennedy (USA)	Torey Pudwill (USA)
2010 (BATB 3)	Paul Rodriguez (USA)	PJ Ladd (USA)	Shane O'Neill (AUS)	Torey Pudwill (USA)
2011 (BATB IV)	Morgan Smith (CAN)	PJ Ladd (USA)	Davis Torgerson (USA)	Mike Mo Capaldi (USA)
2012 (BATB V)	PJ Ladd (USA)	Mike Mo Capaldi (USA)	Shane O'Neill (AUS)	Ishod Wair (USA)
2013 (BATB 6)	PJ Ladd (USA)	Paul Rodriguez (USA)	Shane O'Neill (AUS)	Mike Mo Capaldi (USA)
2014 (BATB 7)	Cody Cepeda (USA)	Luan Oliveira (BRA)	Eric Koston (USA)	Sewa Kroetkov (NED)
2015 (BATB 8)	Sewa Kroetkov (NED)	Shane O'Neill (AUS)	Cody Cepeda (USA)	Tom Asta (USA)
2016 (BATB 9)	Diego Najera (USA)	Micky Papa (CAN)	Youness Amrani (BEL)	Michael Sommer (NOR)
2017 (BATB X)	Chris Joslin (USA)	Sewa Kroetkov (NED)	Shane O'Neill (AUS)	Nick Tucker (USA)
2018 (BATB 11)	Luan Oliveira (BRA)	Chris Joslin (USA)	Sewa Kroetkov (NED)	Tom Asta (USA)
2019 (WBATB)	Monica Torres (BRA)	Alexis Sablone (USA)	Lacey Baker (USA)	Samarria Brevard (USA)
2020 (BATQ)	Sierra Fellers (USA)	TJ Rogers (CAN)	none	none
2021- 2022 (BATB 12)	Jamie Griffin (IRE)	Tyler Peterson (USA)	Sewa Kroetkov (NED)	Chris Cole (USA)
2023 (BATB 13)	Jamie Griffin (IRE)	Nick Holt (USA)	Tyler Peterson (USA)	Chris Cole (USA)
2025 (BATB JPN SE)	Cody Cepeda (USA)	PJ Ladd (USA)	none	none

=== Run & Gun ===
A new contest entitled "Run & Gun" was launched in July 2013, and involves invited competitors conceiving of and filming a 60-second sequence of tricks within a 24-hour period inside the Berrics facility. Each competitor's time inside the Berrics is exclusive and is not shared with any of the other competitors. As of August 11, 2013, the competitors are Shane O'neill, Curren Caples, David Gonzalez, Billy Marks, Manny Santiago, Madars Apse, Felipe Gustavo, Evan Smith, Ishod Wair, Andrew Reynolds, Wes Kremer, Dennis Busenitz, and Torey Pudwill.

Viewers are responsible for voting for each of the 60-second runs and the winner received US$25,000. A Berrics panel of judges will also award US$1,000 to the competitor who performs the best trick during their run.

On October 21, 2013, Felipe Gustavo was revealed as the winner of the Run & Gun contest and Madars Apse won the best trick award for a "wallie jam 50-50 on the handrail".

=== 2Up ===
The Berrics commissioned the CA Ramp Works company to construct five modular blocks and 10 skateboarders were invited to film a segment, using the blocks and incorporating the manual trick (skateboarding only on two wheels). Skateboarders included Joey Brezinski, Koston, Cole, Song, and Youness Amrani, and the winner was voted by the fans of the website. Song was declared the winner on March 4, 2014 and received a trophy in addition to US$10,000 cash.

=== In Transition ===
The "In Transition" contest ran during October 2014. The Berrics "picked 10 of the most progressive skaters on the planet to choose one location each—any location in the world—and film a full part," and viewers will vote for the winner.

== Perspectives ==
A multitude of opinions and perspectives have emerged since the success of the Berrics. In February 2013, US east coast skateboard photographer Ryan Gee explained his view:

I do think what the Berrics is doing is great. I know some may disagree, but it's 2013. Gotta supply the kids with some great content from the Pro's and that site really keeps you up to date with cool video segments. One problem that may already be happening is that kids will grow up with only that and not expand their skating to the streets. Some may think putting out a video part at a park will get them sponsored.

Also in February 2013, Berra himself provided a perspective of the Berrics in relation to the other web-based skateboarding film media channels—Tony Hawk's RIDEChannel on YouTube, Red Bull, Network A (responsible for Rodriguez's Berra-directed LIFE series), and Allisports—that have been established in the US for a worldwide audience: "All making, in my opinion, subpar content that I don't think helps the “industry” more than it's helping YouTube sell commercials for cars and insurance companies."
