= Paul Rodriguez (skateboarder) =

American skateboarder (born 1984)

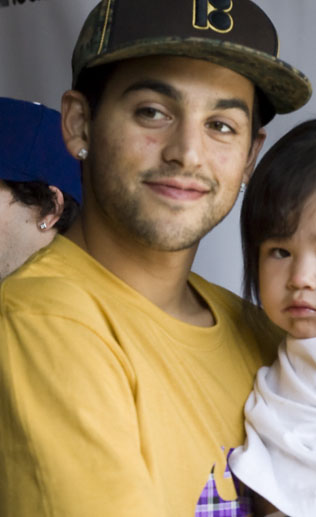
- Rodriguez in 2008

Personal information
- Full name: Paul Martin Rodriguez
- Nickname: P-Rod
- Born: December 31, 1984 (age 41) Los Angeles, California, U.S.
- Occupations: Professional skateboarder; actor; rapper
- Years active: 1995–present
- Height: 5 ft 8 in (1.73 m)
- Weight: 162 lb (73 kg)

Sport
- Country: United States
- Sport: Skateboarding
- Turned pro: 2002
Medal record
Summer X Games
Representing United States
Gold medal – first place	2012 Los Angeles	Street
Gold medal – first place	2009 Los Angeles	Street
Gold medal – first place	2005 Los Angeles	Street
Gold medal – first place	2004 Los Angeles	Street
Silver medal – second place	2008 Los Angeles	Street
Silver medal – second place	2013 Barcelona	Street
Silver medal – second place	2013 Munich	Street
Bronze medal – third place	2003 Los Angeles	Street

Paul Martin Rodriguez (born December 31, 1984), also known by his nickname P-Rod, is an American professional street skateboarder and actor. Rodriguez has won a total of eight medals at the X Games, four of them gold, with the most recent first-place victory occurring in Los Angeles, California, in July 2012.

== Early life, family and education ==
Rodriguez was born in Tarzana, Los Angeles, California. His father is actor and comedian Paul Rodriguez, and his mother is Laura Martinez. He also has an older sister Nikole and a younger brother Lucas. As a child, Rodriguez occasionally met celebrities through his father. He recounted one such memory:

I'll tell you a good story about Mr. T. I believe it was 1988, every year there was a Christmas Day parade in Pasadena [California, US]; I was probably about three-and-a-half, four years-old—I loved Mr. T. He had the cartoon out at the time and all that.... I had to go to the bathroom, my dad was getting interviewed, and, like, I tried to tell him; Mr. T was just standing there, chilling, 'cause they were just talking, and Mr. T goes, "I'll take you". And he throws me up on his shoulders, and I'm sitting up on top of all his gold chains.

Rodriguez's nickname "P-Rod" was given to him by his classmates when he was around eleven years old. When he was twelve, Rodriguez received his first skateboard as a Christmas gift from his parents. Rodriguez had seen a group of skateboarders at his new school and was immediately fascinated by "how they kept their board to their feet and how they could flip it." Rodriguez recalled,"I got money, got myself a board, and it was game over." Rodriguez stated in a July 2013 interview that he slept with new skateboard products as a child due to his passion for skateboarding, and admitted that he slept with his first Street League Skateboarding (SLS) trophy.

Rodriguez attended Birmingham High School in Van Nuys, California.

== Career ==
Rodriguez was initially recruited to the team of a local skateboard shop named "One Eighteen", managed by an Andy Netkin, who was 19 years old at the time, while Rodriguez had just become 14 years old. As he was too shy at the time, Rodriguez asked a friend to submit his "Sponsor me" video tape to Netkin, who was immediately impressed and asked the friend to bring Rodriguez into the store. Netkin then offered Rodriguez a place on the store team the following day at their first meeting—Netkin explained in 2014 that, at the time, he had a strong sense of Rodriguez's future as a "superstar." DNA Skateboards was Rodriguez's first company sponsor and he appeared in the 1999 video Microanalysis. Former professional skateboarder Anthony Pappalardo stated in a June 24, 2014 online radio show—hosted by professional skateboarder Alex Olsen—that he encouraged Joe Castrucci, cofounder of the Habitat skateboard brand, to recruit Rodriguez before he was officially sponsored, but Castrucci declined.

=== City Stars ===
At age sixteen, Rodriguez then rode for City Stars, a company co-founded by professional skateboarder Kareem Campbell in Los Angeles, U.S. Despite being an amateur at the time, Rodriguez earned the last part in the video Street Cinema, which is an honor typically bestowed to an esteemed professional of the team. Rodriguez explained in 2014 that he was initially opposed to Campbell's use of the Jackson 5 song "I Want You Back" for the first half of his part, as it had been used for Guy Mariano's part in the Blind Skateboards video Video Days, but conceded that at the time he "was oblivious to the statement he [Campbell] was trying to make by choosing that song."

Alongside Mikey Taylor, Justin Case, Devine Calloway and Kevin "Spanky" Long, Rodriguez was an amateur team member, while the professional team included Lee Smith, Joey Suriel, Ryan Denman and Eric Pupecki. Rodriguez developed his interest in jewelry during this period, as Campbell was a collector and purchased Rodriguez a diamond bracelet. The period also influenced Rodriguez's musical taste, as he commenced listening to artists like Jay-Z and Nas due to the time spent with Campbell.

City Stars had planned to release a signature skateboard deck design, featuring Rodriguez's name on the grille of a Mercedes-Benz (Rodriguez's first car), but Rodriguez's departure from the company resulted in the product's cancellation. Rodriguez explained in February 2013: "I specifically remember that I knew I wanted to quit and I felt like I could at least show enough respect and tell them before they spent all that money to print up my boards. I didn't want to leave them with an inventory of boards they couldn't sell so I made sure to quit well before they went into production." In 2014 Rodriguez described his time at the brand as "the most magical," with a team that possessed "enthusiasm and passion" that was "contagious."

=== Girl ===
Rodriguez was featured in Transworld Skateboarding's 2002 video, In Bloom. This video showcased a segment of sponsored, talented skaters who were at the start of their respective careers. Following the video's release, Rodriguez commenced riding for Girl Skateboards and achieved professional status in September 2002. Rodriguez explained in a 2013 interview that he was asked to join the Girl team by Eric Koston, whom he called his all-time favorite skateboarder. Rodriguez said that it was the most significant event in his skateboarding career, as it was, "the moment that my dream happened." Rodriguez was sponsored by Girl from the age of seventeen to nineteen, and appears in the Girl Skateboards film Yeah Right. During this period, he shared a house with professional skateboarder and rap artist Jereme Rogers.

In February 2013, Rodriguez identified his debut professional signature skateboard with Girl as his favorite deck graphic of all time. The deck, released in 2002, featured the original Girl logo, Rodriguez's name (written in English), and the Spanish word "Muchachita", meaning "girl", instead of the usual "Girl" brand name. Rodriguez stated that "That was my first pro board and to have it on a company like Girl was awesome." In April 2013 Rodriguez explained that he "loved" his time with the Girl company and, prior to receiving contact from Danny Way—who asked him to join the relaunched Plan B company—he considered Girl a lifelong sponsor.

=== Plan B ===
Following Girl, Rodriguez joined the relaunched Plan B skateboard deck brand that was under the ownership and guidance of original riders Danny Way and Colin McKay, who continue to own the brand as of March 2014.

Rodriguez released a solo Plan B video part, entitled Me, Myself, and I, in 2010. The inaugural Plan B full-length video has been a topic of discussion among the global skateboarding community for a prolonged duration of time, as promotional footage has been released and the company has been in existence for a significant period of time, with a renowned team established during this time period. A late November episode of the internet-based, weekly program, Skateline, broadcast on the RIDE Channel, showed footage of company co-owner and team rider, Danny Way, stating that the video would be made according to a schedule determined by the company regardless of external pressure.

Seven out of Rodriguez's top ten skateboard graphics of all time are Plan B Rodriguez signature designs, according to an interview that was published in February 2013. A collaboration between Plan B and Nike SB is Rodriguez's second favorite graphic, while a Bruce Lee "Fury" deck ("Needless to say, Bruce Lee is my number one influence other than Jesus Christ ... it also shows the three scrapes he had on his face from Enter The Dragon. I love this one.") and a Muhammad Ali deck were also included in the list.

In a July 2013 radio interview with Big Boi on Los Angeles' Power 106, Rodriguez confirmed his departure, which had already been widely speculated. During his winning performance at Stop 5 of the 2013 Street League Skateboarding contest in Portland, Oregon, U.S., Rodriguez rode a skateboard deck with the Plan B logo painted over and the company's logo was removed from his personal website as of July 16, 2013. Rodriguez explained in the interview that he is seeking to "own a little bit more of myself."

=== Post-Plan B ===
In June 2014, following the launch of his own skateboard deck company, Primitive Skateboarding, and his eighth signature shoe with Nike, Rodriguez explained his perspective on the future:

It got to a point where I wanted to get my name on a board and did that, wanted my name on a shoe and did that, wanted other endorsements, awards, and to win certain competitions, and did those, too ... Now it's back to just wanting to get better. I want to keep improving my abilities.

The design for his Nike signature shoe was first leaked onto the Internet at the beginning of the year, leading to an intense degree of discussion among consumers, described by the Ripped Laces website as "hate/skepticism." The corresponding advertisement featured Nike SB team member, Theotis Beasley, and was produced by the Wieden + Kennedy agency.

In a promotional day-in-the-life photo diary for the Hypebeast website, published on December 16, 2014, Rodriguez revealed that his personal skateboarding park is scheduled for a remodeling process. He also stated that his daily caffeine fix brings "happiness," and that the only time his mind is clear is while he is skateboarding.

At the beginning of 2015, Rodriguez joined the Glassy Sunhaters sunglasses brand, co-owned by fellow professional skateboarder Mike Mo Capaldi. His signature sunglasses model was released in February 2015.

== Primitive Skateboarding ==
In 2008, Rodriguez launched Primitive Skateboarding.

== Sponsors ==
As of January 19, 2016, Rodriguez is sponsored by Primitive Skateboarding, Nike Skateboarding, Target, Nixon Watches, Incase Designs, Primitive Skateshop, Glassy Sunhaters, Markisa, Venture, Andalé Bearings As of June 2014, Rodriguez is managed by Circe Wallace.

=== Nike sponsorship ===
Rodriguez is a senior team rider for the Nike skateboarding division, having released his eighth skate shoe model in May 2014, and was responsible for welcoming Luan Oliviera to Nike in September 2012. Rodriguez released his first signature Nike shoe in 2005 following his departure from skate shoe brand, éS Footwear. Rodriguez explained in a 2012 interview for the "Footnotes" segment on the Berrics website:

The transition from éS to Nike was—after I got through making the phone call—I had to call Koston; I had to call, you know, Tony at éS; had to call a few people 'cause we were close; we were good family over there. So, after I got through that hard part, and I could just, and I was free of that burden, then when I got on Nike, it was just, like, the world was opened up—it was insane.

Rodriguez was one of the early riders to be approached by Nike following its second attempt to succeed in the skateboarding market and sub-culture. Rodriguez has explained:

Um, my thoughts on Nike when they first approached me were cool. I mean, like, I did get some criticisms, selling out, this and that ... and I've never really been too worried 'bout that criticism. So my thoughts were just like, I look at it like this, like: My first pair of shoes were the baby Jordans [basketball player, Michael Jordan], you know what I mean, so, like, I had Nikes all my life growing up, and even at the time that I was on éS, any time that I was not skating, I wearing some white-on-white Air Force Ones, or Cortezs—I had a whole flock of Nike anyway ... the way I looked at it, was like, I've been a Nike supporter since birth. So me, I was just stoked, I was just hyped to get on Nike.

Rodriguez released his seventh signature model shoe, entitled the "Paul Rodriguez 7," with Nike in mid-2013. It was designed with Shawn Carboy, who Rodriguez first started working with during the design of his fifth signature model. Rodriguez prioritized the functionality of the shoe, and impact protection is its primary feature.

The "P-ROD 8", Rodriguez's eighth signature shoe was released in May 2014. On May 25, 2014, Rodriguez, alongside fellow Nike team member and skateboarding veteran, Lance Mountain, promoted the model in a video interview, whereby the history of the Nike shoe in skateboarding culture forms the foundation of the segment—Mountain explained that prior to the official launch of the Nike brand onto the skateboarding market, skateboarders said, "This [Nike] is our shoe". Rodriguez described himself as a "Jordan baby", growing up during the peak of Michael Jordan's career, and explained that his eighth Nike shoe model is an "homage to all those things I grew up loving—even before I met skateboarding. And now it's intertwined." The P-ROD 8 features three of Nike's shoe technology developments: "Lunarlon", "Flywire" and "Hyperscreen". (Rodriguez explained in the video with Mountain that the Flywire grips around the foot in the event of a significant fall during the act of skateboarding.)

Following the release of the P-ROD 8, Rodriguez was informed by a Nike executive that he is one of only four Nike athletes to have produced eight signature shoe models—the other being Michael Jordan, Kobe Bryant and LeBron James. In 2014, having been sponsored by Nike for ten years, Rodriguez stated: "it feels like I've also grown with them. I’ve become intertwined with Nike. Our stories are together — at least with Nike SB. The process of making a shoe, at this point, is like a well-oiled machine."

=== Target sponsorship ===
On August 13, 2010, the Target corporation announced in a press release that Rodriguez had joined its sponsorship ranks. He became the second professional skateboarder to have a sponsorship deal with Target, the first being Shaun White, though White is better known for snowboarding. A Target representative stated in the press release, "Paul is an amazing competitor and is the perfect personality to add to our program. With so many accomplishments and a promising future ahead of him, Paul is a natural fit for Target and we’re proud to have our brand represented on his skateboard." Rodriguez was also quoted in the press release: "I grew up right across the street from a Target and have many memories of skating over to the store as a kid. I’ve always loved their brand and am excited about the relationship and potential of what we can do together."

=== AT&T competition ===
In 2012 Rodriguez participated in a competition with AT&T that allowed the winner to participate in the filming of a promotional video featuring Rodriguez. The final video also featured professional skateboarder, Manny Santiago, and was directed by Nigel Alexander, a long-time friend of Rodriguez.

== Private training facility ==
Rodriguez owns a private skateboard park in the Canoga Park, California. that features design elements from his sponsors Mountain Dew, Nike SB, and Target. He designed the park with skateboard park builder Mike Roebke, who used a computer program to blend his own ideas with drawings from Rodriguez. Rodriguez has stated, "I enjoy skating there and I'm blessed to have that type of place at my fingertips."

== LIFE series ==
In collaboration with the Network A media company, Rodriguez is featured in a six-part internet-based series about himself entitled LIFE. The series, produced and directed by professional skateboarder Steve Berra, was released on a weekly basis on the company's YouTube channel.

The first episode "Family First" follows Rodriguez as he revisits his grandmother's home following her cancer diagnosis (Rodriguez foregoes competing at the notable Tampa Pro contest to undertake the visit). Rodriguez explained in 2013 that Berra was the only other person to accompany him during his visit to his grandmother's home, as Rodriguez trusted Berra to be present. In the second episode, entitled "mASTA of disASTA", Rodriguez prepares to compete against Tom Asta in the Battle of the Berrics competition.

In the third episode, "Street League Matters", Rodriguez is filmed in Kansas City, U.S., as he prepares for the qualifying round of one of the stops of the Street League competition. The episode shows Rodriguez as he finishes in fourth place. The fourth episode of LIFE follows Rodriguez, together with close friends Heath Brinkley (photographer and filmer), Justine Schulte, and Carlos Zarazua, as he visits New Orleans, U.S. for the opening of hip hop artist Lil' Wayne's skate park in the wake of Hurricane Katrina—the skate park is called the "Truckstop" and is located in the Lower Ninth Ward area.

In "The Other Half", the fifth episode of LIFE, the camera follows Rodriguez as he competes in the Dew Tour contest and discusses the role of contests in relation to the more fundamental aspects of a professional street skateboarder's life—video footage and street skateboarding.

== Influence ==
Transworld SKATEboarding selected Rodriguez for the thirtieth position of its "30 Most Influential Skaters of All Time" list, released in December 2011. In response to the selection, Rodriguez revealed that Koston and Andrew Reynolds are two professional skateboarders who he considers as influential in a career sense, due to their "longevity", "the impacts they've had", and the degree of respect they have garnered. In an April 2013 interview, Rodriguez added Tom Penny to his "most influential" list and stated, "Him [Penny], Koston and Reynolds. That's my combo right there.".

In regard to Rodriguez, professional skateboarder Nyjah Huston explained in December 2013:

He is such a good dude, on and off the [skate]board. He's such a professional person. He's an amazing street skater, and just as good of a contest skater. So, he's a pretty ideal professional skateboarder, that's for sure.

== Company owner ==
As of June 2014, Rodriguez is the owner of, or an investor in, the skateboard brands Primitive (retail outlet, apparel and skateboard deck company), Markisa (wallets and accessories) and Andale (skateboard bearings), the latter in partnership with fellow professional skateboarder Joey Brezinski. In relation to Andale, Brezinski explained:

Originally I was working on the idea and I went through all the legal stuff. I quit my bearing sponsor at the time and I started talking to Paul about it because he had recently quit Silver at that point. I didn't know if he had plans with FKD or not, but I presented Andale to him as something we could do together. He was down and I proceeded to move forward. It took about two years to get to this point, doing a lot of work and a lot of planning.

The Primitive company consists of a retail store in Los Angeles that specializes in footwear, an apparel line, and a skateboard deck brand. Rodriguez established the business in around 2005–2006 with three partners, including two friends whom he has known since childhood. In April 2014, Rodriguez was identified as the president of the company, while Netkin is the CEO and founder, and Jubal Jones is the creative director—Netkin and Jones were the original store employees and handled US$300 in sales on the opening day. Netkin describes the Primitive store, which officially opened on July 27, 2008, as a "cross-genre" retail outlet that also sells products, which skateboarders can relate to, outside of the skateboarding subculture.

Following the eventual success of the retail outlet, the company commenced its apparel brand, which was a part of the founders' original plan. The popularity of the apparel brand grew rapidly and in April 2014, Jones stated that he solely focuses on the brand, while new employees are constantly hired. In 2014 Primitive Apparel is available in 11 countries and the company consists of 25 people.

The Primitive brand was expanded into a skateboard deck company called "Primitive Skateboarding" in April 2014.

Together with action sports filmmaker Josh Landon and professional US skateboarder Mikey Taylor, Rodriguez cofounded the Saint Archer Brewing Co., a microbrewery that is co-owned by people who are also the brand's "Ambassadors." The team of Ambassadors includes professional skateboarders Eric Koston, Brian "Slash" Hansen, and Bryan Herman; professional and non-professional surfers Josh Kerr, Taylor Knox, Dusty Payne, Laura Enever, and Jeff Johnson; former professional snowboarder Todd Richards; photographer Atiba Jefferson; and surfboard shaper Chris Christenson. Together with Saint Archer's other Ambassadors, Rodriguez has participated in "Tasting Room" nights that are held at the brewery, in which the Ambassadors pour and serve beers.

In a June 2014 interview, Rodriguez asserted that he is a "young, beginning entrepreneur who's learning the ropes of the game," before revealing the philosophy that has benefited him over the course of his career: "find people that are just as passionate at what they do as you are about what you do."

== Personal life ==
As of November 2013, Rodriguez resides in Northridge, California.

As of August 2010, his partner was Rainbow Alexander and the pair are the parents of daughter Heaven Love. They shared the parenting of Heaven Love while dating Rachel Metz before calling it quits in May 2020. In an April 2013 interview, Rodriguez described himself as a "certified workaholic", and stated that skateboarding and fatherhood are his primary concerns in life. In regard to his Mexican American heritage, Rodriguez has explained:

It's my roots. It's where I come from; it's my genetics, my DNA, my body, my build. All from my heritage. My ancestors all before me contributed to the blessings I'm living now. It's where you come from. You can never be ignorant to where you come from because they're responsible for what you are now.

Rodriguez has stated in an interview with the NetworkA media channel that he holds aspirations for a serious acting career following his time with professional skateboarding—he revealed that he admires the work of Johnny Depp, Christian Bale, and Edward Norton. In addition to Bruce Lee, Alexander the Great, and Jesus Christ, Rodriguez is also influenced by rapper Tupac Shakur, and revealed in February 2013 that a skateboard deck graphic featuring Shakur would be a worthwhile design: "I'd like to get that photo of Tupac standing on the wall with his shirt off and he's got the Thug Life tattoo and the glock in his waist band and a blunt in his hand. That would be sick."

== Awards ==
Rodriguez received the 2002 "Rookie of the Year" award from the Transworld SKATEboarding publication.

== Filmography ==
Film
Year	Title	Role	Notes
2008	Vicious Circle	R.J.	Lead role
2009	Street Dreams	Derrick Cabrera	Lead role
2013	The Motivation	Himself	Documentary
2019	The Curse of La Llorona	Officer Claro	Horror

Television
Year	Title	Role	Notes
2002	The Brothers García	Cortez	Guest role "School Daze" (season 3: episode 1)
2009	Rob Dyrdek's Fantasy Factory	Himself	Recurring role "This is Not Mom Certified" (season 1: episode 6) "Dusty Monkey" (season 1: episode 12) "Making Moves" (season 2: episode 9)
2020	Selena: The Series	Roger Garcia	Recurring role

== Video game appearances ==
Video games
Year	Title	Role	Notes
2003	Tony Hawk's Underground	Himself	
2005	Tony Hawk's American Wasteland	Himself	
2006	Tony Hawk's Project 8	Himself	
2007	Skate	Himself	
2009	Tony Hawk: Ride	Himself	

== Videography ==
Skateboarding videos
Year	Title	Role	Notes
1999	Micro Analysis	Himself	DNA Skateboards video
2000	Logic – Issue 06	Himself	Logic video magazine
2001	Project of a Lifetime	Himself	Monkey Business
2001	Logic – Issue 09	Himself	Logic video magazine
2001	Street Cinema	Himself	City Stars video
2001	In Bloom	Himself	Transworld Skateboarding video
2001	Fourstar - Catalog Shoot	Himself	Fourstar promotional video
2002	411VM - Vancouver 2002	Himself	411VM video magazine
2002	éS - Germany Tour 2002	Himself	éS tour video
2002	411VM - Issue 50	Himself	411VM video magazine
2002	411VM – Issue 51	Himself	411 video magazine
2002	411VM – Issue 58	Himself	411VM video magazine
2002	16 Below Volume 1, First Born	Himself	Independent video
2003	Yeah Right	Himself	Girl: Yeah Right video
2003	Thrasher - King Of The Road 2003	Himself	Thrasher magazine video
2004	411VM - Issue 63	Himself	411VM video magazine
2004	Nike SB - On Tap	Himself	Nike SB promotional video
2005	FKD Video	Himself	FKD video
2005	Girl - Oi! Meets Girl!	Himself	Girl tour video
2005	Forecast	Himself	Independent video (produced by Rodriguez)
2006	Transworld - A Time To Shine	Himself	Transworld Skateboarding video
2006	Plan B - Live After Death	Himself	Plan B promotional video
2006	Elwood - 1st & Hope	Himself	Elwood video (directed by professional skateboarder, Brian Lotti)
2007	Nike SB - Nothing But The Truth	Himself	Nike SB video
2007	Thrasher - Money For Blood	Himself	Thrasher magazine contest video
2007	Streets: LA	Himself	Productions video
2008	Plan B - Superfuture	Himself	Plan B promotional video
2008	Silver In Barcelona	Himself	Silver tour video
2008	Plan B In Dominican Republic	Himself	Plan B tour video
2009	Proof	Himself	Independent video (produced by Rodriguez)
2009	Gift/Nike SB China - It's A Wrap	Himself	Girl/Nike SB tour video
2009	Plan B In Arizona	Himself	Plan B tour video
2010	Me, Myself & I	Himself	Plan B solo video
2010	Slap - One In A Million 7	Himself	Slap magazine contest video
2010	FKD - Park Project Finale	Himself	FKD web video
2010	Nike SB - Don't Fear The Sweeper	Himself	Nike SB tour video
2010	Battle Commander	Himself	The Berrics video
2010	Plan B United	Himself	The Berrics video
2011	Plan B North East Tour	Himself	Plan B tour video
2012	Mountain Dew SXSW	Himself	Mountain Dew tour video
2013	Pain Is Beauty	Himself	Primitive video

We are Blood 2015

== Contest history ==
=== X Games (Street) ===
Bronze: 2003 Los Angeles

- Gold: 2004 Los Angeles
- Gold: 2005 Los Angeles
- Silver: 2008 Los Angeles
- Gold: 2009 Los Angeles
- Gold: 2012 Los Angeles
- Silver: 2013 Barcelona (Street League Skateboarding (SLS) partnership event)
- Silver: 2013 Munich (SLS partnership event)

=== Dew Action Sports Tour ===
- Fourth place: 2005
- Second place: 2008
- Second place: 2011
- Third place: 2013

=== Tampa Pro (Street) ===
- Fifth place: 2002
- Third place: 2007
- Second place: 2009
- First place: 2010

=== Street League Skateboarding ===
- Won: 2012 Street League Skateboarding – Stop 3, Glendale, Arizona, U.S.
- Silver: 2013 Barcelona Street League Skateboarding
- Won: 2013 Street League Skateboarding – Stop 5, Portland, Oregon, U.S.
- Won: 2016 Street League Skateboarding Munich, Germany

=== Battle at the Berrics ===
- Won: 2010 Battle at the Berrics 3 (second place, PJ Ladd; third place, Shane O'Neill)
- Second place: 2009 (first place: Chris Cole)
- Second place: 2013 (first place: pj ladd)
