= Manny Santiago =

Puerto Rican skateboarder

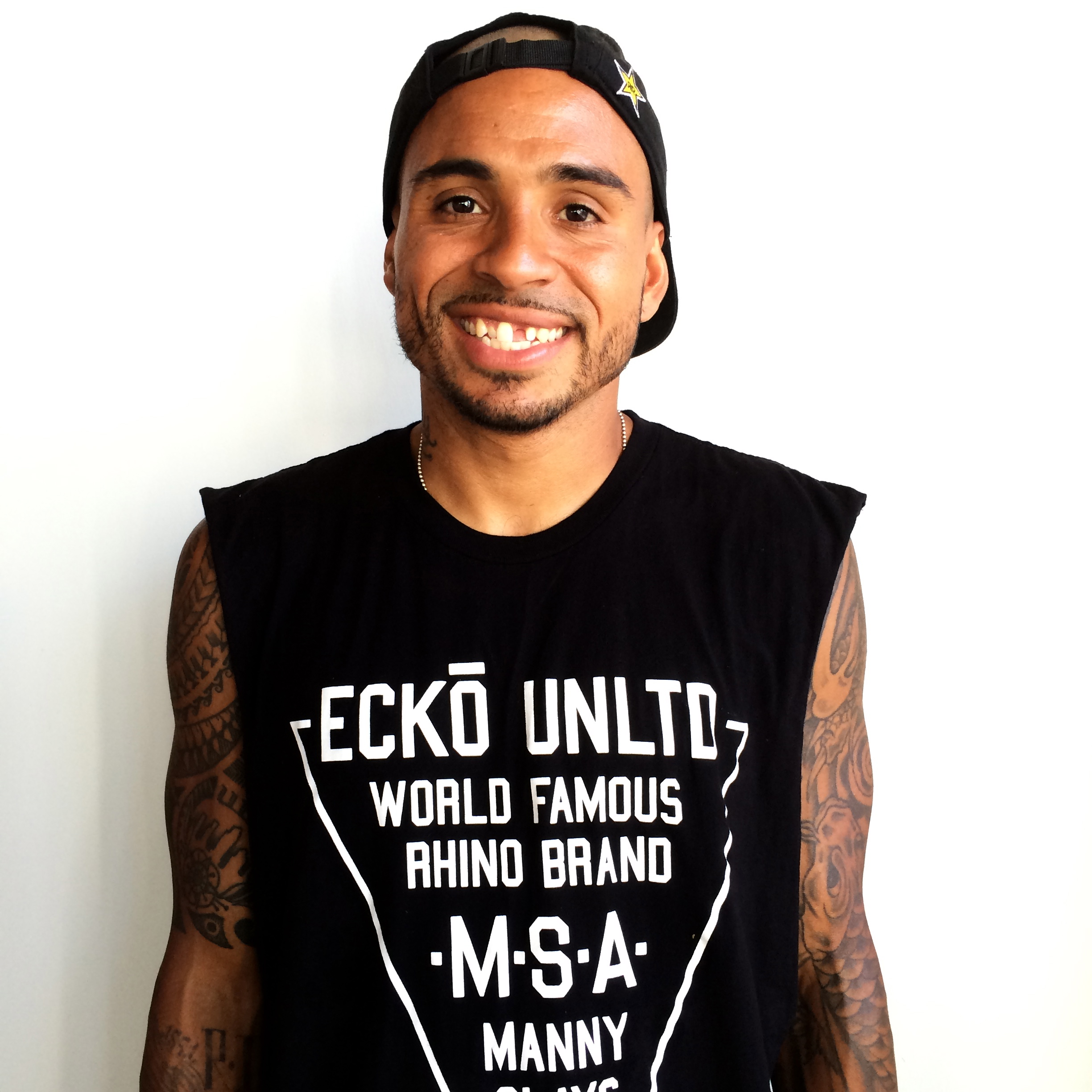
- Santiago in 2014

Personal information
- Full name: Emanuel Santiago
- Nickname: "Manny Slays All"
- Nationality: Puerto Rican
- Born: September 10, 1985 (age 41) Cayey, Puerto Rico
- Height: 5 ft 7 in (170 cm)
- Weight: 150 lb (68 kg)

Sport
- Sport: Skateboarding
- Turned pro: 2010

Emanuel "Manny" Santiago (born September 10, 1985), nicknamed "Manny Slays All", is a professional skateboarder from Cayey, Puerto Rico. Santiago is the first Puerto Rican skateboarder to be in the Street League Skateboarding (SLS) "premier competitive series". In 2013, Santiago won two consecutive stops in the first ever "Select Series" at SLS Brazil and Barcelona. As an amateur, Santiago won 1st place for Best Trick at the Black Box Crossroads Contest amongst professional skateboarders like Nyjah Huston, Chris Cole, Torey Pudwill, and Ryan Sheckler. In 2012, he became the first Puerto Rican street skateboarder to place in the top three in the X Games after coming in 3rd place at the finals in Barcelona. He is famously recognized for his missing tooth, ear-to-ear smile, and endlessly positive demeanor.

== Early life ==
Santiago was born in Cayey, Puerto Rico, and raised in Lowell, Massachusetts. As a kid, Santiago attended the local Boys & Girls Club near the Roberto Clemente Skate Park. He began skateboarding at the age of 14. Skateboarding served as an oasis from the growing gang culture in Lowell for Santiago. In 2012 during an interview with Vice Magazine, Santiago stated:

"Lowell ended up building some skate parks, and one happened to be near the Boys' Club where I went. A few of my good friends started skating, so I tried it. The moment I stepped on a board I was hooked, and I haven't stopped."

Santiago also revealed in a 2014 interview with Eckō Unltd. that growing up in an underprivileged environment made him who he is today.

== Amateur career ==
Santiago participated in several national and international amateur contests. During the 2006 Damn Am Contest in Minneapolis, Minnesota, Santiago earned a golden ticket by placing 1st in qualifiers and finished in 1st place with tricks including kickflip backside 50-50, bigspin backside boardslide, and varial heelflip backside boardslide. Santiago competed in the 2009 Zoo York's AM Getting Paid Contest in Montreal, Quebec, Canada where he placed 2nd with tricks including kickflip backside crooked grind, laser heel, 360 shuvit lipslide.

Crossroads

Early in his career Santiago won 1st place for "Best Trick" in the Black Box Crossroads Best Trick Contest alongside professional skateboarders like Nyjah Huston, Chris Cole, Torey Pudwill, Ryan Sheckler, et al. Shortly after, Santiago became a professional skateboarder.

== Professional career ==
In 2010, Santiago left Think Skateboards and had his professional board graphic made by AMMO skateboards, a skateboard company owned by professional skateboarder and skateboarding personality, Felix Arguelles.

=== Dew Tour ===
In 2011, Santiago won Alli Sport's Ball Park Rookie of The Year at Dew Tour.

When is being called a "rookie" a good thing? When you're called Ball Park's Rookie of the Year. The highest tour rookie in both skateboarding and BMX

=== Street League (SLS) ===
In 2013, Santiago finished in 1st place during Street League Skateboarding (SLS) Contests located in Brazil and Barcelona. Both wins made him the first ever Street League Skateboarding (SLS) "Select Series Champion" and first ever "Select Series Winner" to advance to the finals and the podium.

Qualifying for SLS in 2013, [Manny Santiago] has showed us he can keep up with the best of them in 2014. Manny's loving and positive energy makes him one seriously entertaining skater to watch.

== Manny Slays All ==
Santiago has branded a series of hats, shirts, stickers and accessories with the first of letter in each word of his "Manny Slays All" brand, making "MSA" a prominent signature logo. The Manny Slays All line has branched out into collaborations with other companies such as Rastaclat, Grizzly Griptape, Famous Stars and Straps, and Eckō Unltd. Santiago later added a machete alongside the letters: MSA as his logo. This current logo is watermarked on all of his photographs and videos posted on social media. Santiago's fan base continues to rapidly spike with daily updates on his skateboarding lifestyle. "Beyond dropping sick videos and skating [competitions], Manny runs one of the best skate/ lifestyle blogs on the internet."

== Sponsors ==
As of April 2, 2019, Santiago is sponsored by Fortune Skateboards, Eckō Unltd., Grizzly Griptape, Diamond Supply Co., Krux Trucks, Andale Bearings, Funbox Monthly,, SK8HOP and Black Plague Brewing.

== Philanthropy ==
Prince of Puerto Rico

In 2011, Santiago organized his first Prince of Puerto Rico skateboarding contest.

"With his Rookie of the Year winnings from the 2011 Dew Tour, Manny gives back to his friends and teammates in order to best appreciate how skating has affected his life. What started out as a small trip grew into a full tour equipped with multiple teams, demos and a contest for the kids."

Santiago and fellow professional skateboarder Dave Bachinsky helped local skaters repair a skatepark in Naguabo, Puerto Rico, ahead of the Prince of Puerto Rico contest.

== SK8HOP ==
In 2012, Santiago began a skateboarding distribution with Fico Rodriguez called SK8HOP in Puerto Rico. In 2014, Santiago opened his first skateboard shop, SK8HOP with Fico Rodriguez in Mayaguez, Puerto Rico.

== Videography ==
9-10-11

On Santiago's 26th birthday he published a street skateboarding video part titled, 9-10-11. With constant published teasers, Santiago managed to build up much anticipation from his fan base. Soon after the release of 9-10-11, it became an Internet sensation within the skateboarding community.

Salt N' Pepper

Santiago and childhood friend and professional skateboarder, Dave Bachinksky teamed up in a video part that features street skateboarding on the West Coast of the United States as well as the island Puerto Rico. The video premiered at The Berrics.

Live & Learn Series

In 2013, Santiago began filming an internet-based series about his life through skateboarding entitled LIVE&LEARN. The series gives insight to Santiago's everyday life. The first episode "Stoner Park" follows Santiago as he gathers a group of close friends and professional skateboarders as they head to "Stoner Park" for a day of skating. The episode features the likes of Dave Bachinsky, Terell Robinson, Paul Rodriguez, and Shane O'neill to name a few. After the skate park, the group eventually heads to Santiago's home to administer some tattoos. In the second episode, entitled "San Francisco Mission", Santiago and friends head to San Francisco, CA to film street skateboarding for his upcoming video project 'Salt n' Pepper'. The third episode of LIVE&LEARN follows Santiago to meet up with professional skateboarder and celebrity, Ryan Sheckler in San Clemente, CA to skate his private warehouse.

In the fourth episode of LIVE&LEARN, "Prince of Puerto Rico", the camera follows Santiago to his country of origin, Puerto Rico. Santiago rides through the city streets and eventually leads his group to a demo for the local kids. "A Day for the Sponsors" is the fifth installment of the series and consists of Santiago visiting some of his sponsors, as well as a trip to his doctor to examine his injured knee. The sixth episode, "Bon Voyage Bastien", features Santiago bidding a farewell to friend and professional skateboarder Bastian Salabanzi as he heads home to France. In LIVE&LEARN episode seven, "Street League Pro Open", Santiago prepares to compete in the Street League Skateboarding competition at the Nike skate park 6th and Mill in Los Angeles.

Pound for Pound

On 11/20/2014, Thrasher Magazine presented to the world - Manny's "Pound for Pound" skate part in conjunction with Eckō Unltd. The premier was held in Hollywood, CA by his sponsor Rockstar Energy.

== Missing Tooth ==
In 2009, Santiago chipped his tooth in a skateboarding accident while practicing for the Costa Mesa Damn AM Contest. Santiago eventually needed the entire tooth extracted for health reasons. Due to complications, Santiago ultimately decided to not replace the tooth. The remainder of Santiago's tooth is dipped in white gold with a diamond and worn by him daily as a necklace charm.

After Santiago's tooth extraction, he continued to work to represent a positive attitude despite the procedure. Santiago's missing tooth and smile became a recognizable trademark for Manny Slays All, aka MSA. Santiago's fans commonly reference MSA when chipping or losing teeth in skateboard accidents. Santiago's missing tooth has thus become a trend and a part of his branding image.

== Personal life ==
Santiago is a strict vegetarian and actively promotes healthy dieting alongside routine fitness. In an interview with Focus Magazine Santiago stated, "My diet is a simple one: no muscle tissue in my stomach. I try and cut bread and cheese out as well." Santiago lives in Los Angeles, California with professional skateboarder Chaz Ortiz. Santiago has a son, Ocean Santiago born in 2012. Santiago was also in a relationship with pro skater Christiana Means.

== Contest History ==
2005

- K.R.3.A.M. AM AM Best Trick - 4th

2006

- Damn AM Minnesota - 1st

2008

- Damn AM Minneapolis Street Semi Finals - 5th

2010

- Crossroads Best Trick Contest - 1st

2011

- Maloof Money Cup DC Pro Semi-Finals - 5th
- Maloof Money Cup DC Pro Finals Brackets - 4th
- Red Bull Triple Set Best Trick Contest - 2nd
- Dew Tour Portland - 3rd
- Dew Tour "Rookie Of the Year"

2012

- Skateboarding Gives Back at The Berrics - 3rd
- X Games, Street - 6th
- MMC South Africa Pro/Open Street - 3rd
- Red Bull Triple Set Best Trick Contest - 1st

2013

- Street League Select Series, Brazil - 1st
- Street League Select Series, Barcelona - 1st
- Street League Finals, Barcelona - 3rd
- Kia World Games, Street - 2nd

2019

- FISE World "Battle Of The Champions", Saudi Arabia - 1st
- Puerto Rico "Skateboarding Olympic Team" Qualifier - 1st
