= Cory Kennedy =

Kory or Cory Kennedy may refer to:

- Cory Kennedy (model) (born 1990), American Internet celebrity
- Cory Kennedy (skateboarder) (born 1990), American professional skateboarder
- Kory Kennedy (born 1993), Canadian ice hockey player in 2013–14 OJHL season
