= Donovan Strain =

American stand-up comedian and skateboarder

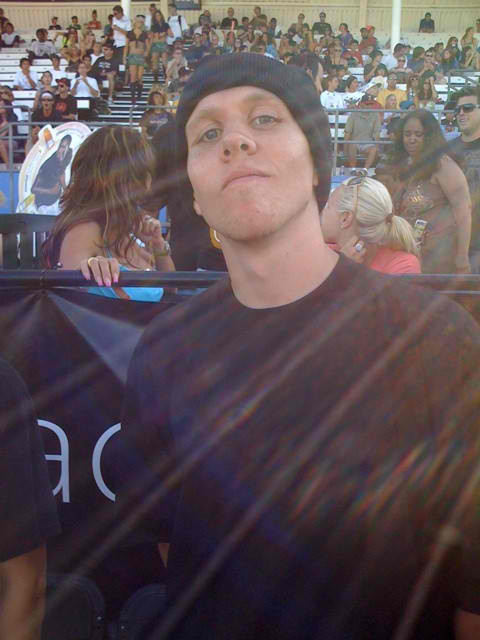
- Strain at Maloof Money Cup in 2009
- Born: November 22, 1985 (age 40); Camarillo, California, U.S.

Comedy career
- Years active: 2013-present
- Medium: Stand-up
- Subject: Observational
- Website: Twitter.com/DonovanStrain

Donovan Strain (born November 22, 1985) is a stand-up comedian and skateboarder living in Los Angeles, California.

== Biography ==
=== Skateboarding ===
Strain started the skateboarding-based comedy segment titled "Buttery Ass Mondays" on The Berrics, where he was credited for inventing the skateboarding tricks Grape Flip, and Double Grape Flip. The series ran until 2010 when it was cancelled and removed from the archives. In October 2013, Strain's "Buttery Ass Mondays" returned to The Berrics' archive, suggesting new episodes of the series would be made for 2014. On April 1, 2014, Donovan's series made a return to The Berrics with the newly titled series "The Donovan Strain Show".

In 2008, Strain participated in his first professional skateboard contest for the original "Battle at the Berrics" where he won his first round match against Sean Malto, only to be knocked out of the contest in the second round by Eric Koston.

He received his first signature skateboard with the brand Sk8mafia in 2008 before a split with the brand and receiving his next signature skateboard with City Skateboards in 2009.

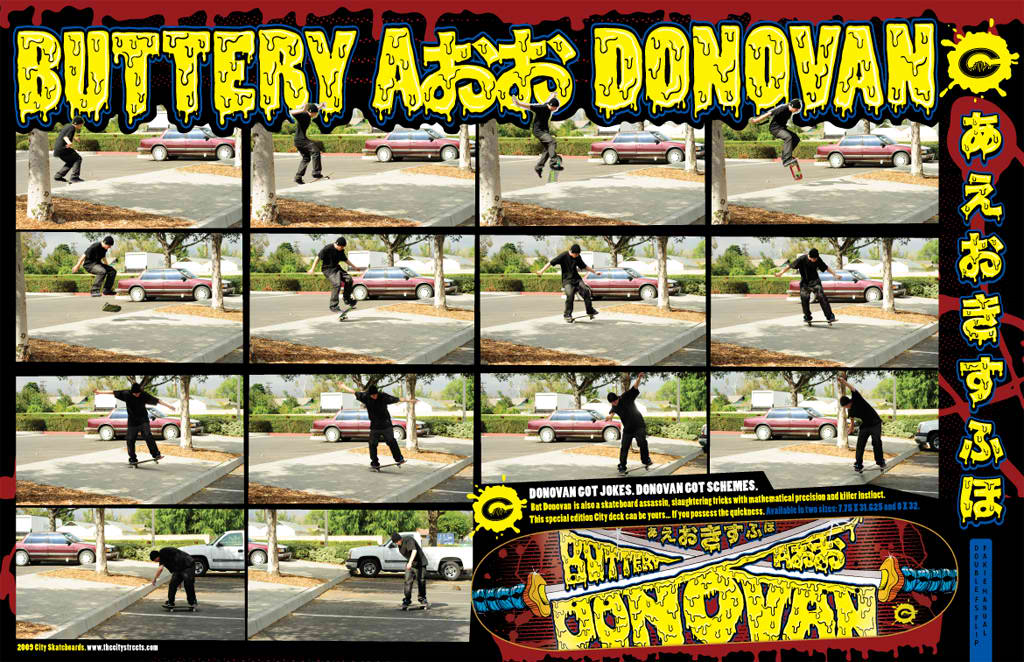
Donovan Strain skating in City Skateboards advertisement featured in Thrasher Magazine's January 2010 issue for his 2nd signature board

In 2010 Donovan got involved with the Make-A-Wish foundation when he was able to help grant a wish for a kid from Florida named Alex that requested to meet him.

In 2010, he moved to New York City, where he hosted a video series on his own site MurkAvenue.com

=== "It Was a Good Day" ===
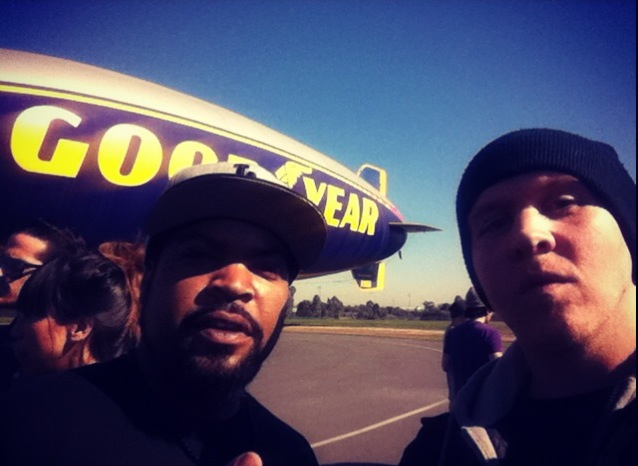
Ice Cube and Donovan Strain at the Goodyear Blimp Airport 2014 event

In 2012, Strain wrote a post on the website Tumblr breaking down the lyrics to Ice Cube's 1993 classic "It Was a Good Day" deducing that everything in the song actually happened on the date January 20, 1992. This was picked up by news outlets including CNN, Daily News (New York), and Late Night with Jimmy Fallon where Ice Cube commented "It doesn't make any sense at all, but it's cool". On January 20, 2014 Goodyear invited both Ice Cube and Donovan Strain to their Goodyear Blimp airport for a charity event to witness the blimp fly over south central Los Angeles reading "Ice Cube Says Today Was A Good Day".

=== Stand-up comedy ===
Donovan Strain performing stand-up at Flappers Comedy Club in Burbank, CA 2013

Strain started performing stand-up comedy in 2013 at Flappers Comedy Club located in Burbank, CA.
