= Cory Kennedy (skateboarder) =

American skateboarder (born 1990)

- Born: October 4, 1990 (age 36); Lake Stevens, Washington, U.S.
- Occupation: Professional skateboarder
- Conviction: Vehicular homicide
- Penalty: 4 years' in prison, but released after 2.5 yrs

Cory Kennedy (born October 4, 1990) is an American professional skateboarder.

== Skateboarding ==
Kennedy first came to prominence after winning the amateur competition "Bang Yo'self 2", for which contestants were required to submit video parts to the judges from The Berrics website. In 2009, Kennedy finished in third place at "The Battle at the Berrics 2" contest, losing to Paul Rodriguez in the finals round.

In October 2009, the trailer for the full-length skateboard video Beware of Sasquatch was released, in which Kennedy appears in a part spanning just under 10 minutes, alongside skateboarders such as David Gravette and Vince de Valle. Brandon Jensen, who filmed and edited the video, published Kennedy's part on his YouTube channel in May 2010.

In 2010, Kennedy named a switch front-foot impossible 180, a trick that he landed down the Berrics seven-stair with masterfully, the "Merlin Twist". In a subsequent interview, Kennedy attempted to explain the trick: "Your back foot is in the switch bigspin position. And you put your front foot pretty much on the nose. Then just scoop it really hard. Then, I don't know, dip your front foot down to whip the board around and then kinda hope you land it [laughs]. I'm not very good at explaining."

In 2010 Kennedy won the MVP award for Thrasher magazine's "King of the Road" contest. One year later, he won the "Bob Gnar" award at King of the Road 2011.

In 2011 Kennedy attained professional status with Girl Skateboards and appears in the 2012 Girl/Chocolate video Pretty Sweet.

Formerly sponsored by the RVCA apparel company, Kennedy accompanied the Fourstar Clothing team on an Australian tour in February 2014. A video narrated by the brand's cofounder, Eric Koston, was then published in March 2014 announcing Kennedy's recruitment to the Fourstar skateboard team. Koston explained:

He was chasing us with his camera; he was always in the way; eating shit; last to the bus; last off the bus; fought nasty; rode the worst board; stole our hats; hung his shit everywhere; never put down the "jam box;" was a "cop magnet;" ruined our grip; ruined our bearings; didn't take skating seriously; thought he was the coolest; bleeding all the time; slammed right on top of me; and we put him on the team anyway. Welcome to Fourstar Cory ... you dipshit.

Alongside professional skateboarders Vincent Alvarez, Stevie Perez, Elijah Berle, and Raven Tershy, Kennedy is a member of the "Trunk Boys" crew. Fellow professional skateboarder and company owner Guy Mariano explained his perspective in relation to the crew: "Their energy may look really wild, but they are all good kids with solid heads on their shoulders. I love Vince’s heart, passion and speed, Raven’s transition skills, Eli’s fearlessness, Cory’s natural ability to progress, and Stevie’s style and grace."

As of April 2014, Kennedy was sponsored professionally by Fourstar, Girl, Royal Trucks, Glassy Sunhaters, Jessup Griptape, Nike SB, and Spitfire.

=== Videography ===
- Thrasher: King Of The Road 2010 (2010)
- Girl/Chocolate: Der Bratwurst Tour Ever (2010)
- RVCA: Dick Moves (2010)
- Girl: Outbackwards (2010)
- Cory Kennedy Slice of Life (2010)
- Nike SB: Don't Fear The Sweeper (2010)
- Beware of the Sasquatch (2010)
- Thrasher: King Of The Road 2011 (2011)
- Girl: Unbeleafable (2011)
- Sk8 Rats DVD Collection Volume #1 (2011)
- Sk8rats DVD Collection Volume #2 (2012)
- Pretty Sweet (2012)
- Sk8rats: Rat Poison (2014)
- Nike SB: Chronicles 3 (2015)
- Sk8rats: Pump On This (2019)

== Incarceration ==
On February 8, 2018, Kennedy was charged with vehicular homicide as a result of his involvement in a single-vehicle collision on August 30, 2017, when Kennedy was driving over the speed limit while under the influence, on his native Vashon Island, Washington. Kennedy lost control of the car, skidded off the road, and slammed passenger side-first into a tree, instantly killing its front-seat passenger, 45-year-old Preston "P-Stone" Maigetter, a married father of two sons and a popular videographer for Thrasher magazine. Another passenger suffered a fractured foot.

Kennedy was uninjured; his blood alcohol level was approximately 0.10 at the time of the crash — over the state's legal limit of 0.08. Subsequent results from a blood draw also indicated the presence of marijuana, and prosecutors concluded that "impairing substances may have played a role in the crash." Kennedy pleaded guilty to the charge of vehicular homicide, as well as vehicular assault, reckless driving, and driving under influence. He faced eight to twelve years in prison.

However, an outpouring of support from friends and family, including the victims' friends and family, testified to Kennedy's inherently good character and caused his sentence to be reduced to four years in prison. Maigetter's mother wrote of her son and Kennedy's close friendship, and advocated on Maigetter's behalf that Kennedy should not serve any prison time: "Preston would have wanted that his friend and colleague, Cory, never be imprisoned for his actions but, as an alternative, for Cory to take responsibility and to give back to the community."

Kennedy was initially held at Coyote Ridge Corrections Center, a medium security prison in Connell, Washington. He was moved to Cedar Creek Corrections Center, a minimum security prison in Littlerock, Washington, in 2019, a little over a year into his sentence. He was released on parole on April 19, 2021.
