= Primitive Skateboarding =

American skateboard company

Primitive Skateboarding is a skateboard company created by professional skateboarder Paul Rodriguez, Executive Vice President Heath Brinkley, CEO Andy Netkin, and Jubal Jones. Primitive is headquartered in Los Angeles, California.

== History ==
In 2008, Paul Rodriguez, Heath Brinkley, Andy Netkin, Jay Partow, and Jubal Jones founded "Primitive", a skateboard and clothing store in Encino, CA. Paul Rodriguez had been sponsored by Plan B Skateboards, but quit the team out of a desire to have more ownership and control over his career. After Paul's departure from Plan B, he printed and sold a limited run of 500 gold-foil Primitive decks (which just so happened to make a couple extra sales, with a full run of 516 decks), and due to the strong response, that was the push for the group to decide to launch an ongoing skateboard company, with the help of Andy and Jubal.

Ten months after Paul Rodriguez's departure from Plan B, Primitive Skateboarding was officially announced on April 10, 2014. The original team was Paul Rodriguez as a pro, with Carlos Ribeiro and Nick Tucker as amateurs. To this day in 2026, Paul still actively rides as a pro for his company, even though he has taken a more hands on approach to managing it.

== Collaborations ==
Primitive has featured a number of collaborations that featured rappers like Tupac Shakur and Notorious B.I.G. along with various anime and cartoon programs such as Dragon Ball Z, Rick and Morty, Naruto, and Sailor Moon.

== Team ==
=== Professional ===
- Paul Rodriguez
- Carlos Ribeiro
- Miles Silvas
- Spencer Hamilton
- Trent McClung
- Wade Desarmo
- Tiago Lemos
- Giovanni Vianna
- Tre Williams
- Kyonosuke Yamashita
- Filipe Mota
- Tre Williams

=== Amateur ===
- Johnny Hernandez
- Aimu Yamazuki

=== Former ===
- Shane O’Neill
- Franky Villani
- Devine Calloway
- Nick Tucker
- Bastien Salabanzi
- Robert Niel
- Diego Najera
- JB Gillet
- Marek Zaprazny
- Brian Peacock
