= Torey Pudwill =

American skateboarder (born 1990)

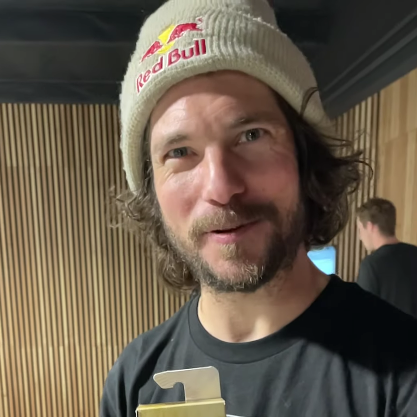
- Pudwill in 2023

Personal information
- Born: May 2, 1990 (age 36) Simi Valley, California, U.S.
- Height: 5 ft 9 in (1.75 m)
- Weight: 135 lb (61 kg)

Sport
- Country: United States
- Sport: Skateboarding
Medal record
Men's street skateboarding
Representing the United States
World Championships
Silver medal – second place	2014 Newark	Street
Summer X Games
Bronze medal – third place	2013 Foz do Iguaçu	Street

Torey Jamieson Pudwill (born May 2, 1990), also known by his nicknames "T-Puds and The Worm", is an American professional street skateboarder.

== Early life ==
Pudwill was born in Simi Valley, California, United States. In a February 2013 online interview, Pudwill explained that Justin Schulte (also a sponsored skateboarder as of March 2013) was the friend that he would mostly skateboard with during his early adolescence.

As a teenager, Pudwill would spend his time skateboarding with his friend Arturo at the Skatelab in Simi Valley, California. Five years after the facility opened, Pudwill was featured in the Skatelab "all-time accident report" and owner Todd Huber explained in 2009: "Torey had 117 accidents—more than anyone else on there and he was only thirteen." It was during his teenage years that Pudwill originated the Grizzly Griptape brand.

== Professional skateboarding ==
Pudwill was around 14 years of age when his part appeared in the 2005 Shorty's video How To Go Pro. Shorty's was Pudwill's first board sponsor and following the demise of the brand, he was a flow rider for Alien Workshop for "at least a year".

Pudwill was then invited to join the Almost team by company co-owner Daewon Song—who had first made contact after the cessation of Shorty's—during the pair's time as DVS team riders (as of December 2014, Pudwill and Song remain DVS teammates). Pudwill explained in 2010:

After Alien [Workshop], I floated around, getting boards from Chocolate [Skateboards] for a couple months and then Daewon [Song] hit me up. He hit me up before that, around the time I left Shorty’s, but I had something lined up with Alien, so I wanted to stay loyal—not hop around. It didn’t work out the way I saw it in my head though.

Pudwill accepted Song's offer and achieved professional status in August 2008 during his tenure at Almost. Following the announcement that Pudwill had decided to join the Plan B team, Schulte was announced as a new Almost rider and a short video part accompanied the announcement.

An official announcement was released in March 2010, stating that Pudwill had joined the Plan B Skateboards team, alongside skateboarders such as Danny Way, Colin McKay, Ryan Sheckler, PJ Ladd and Paul Rodriguez. A welcome video that was published on the Internet also accompanied the announcement.

Following his change to Plan B, Pudwill used some of the footage he had filmed while at Almost for his first-ever video part in a TransWorld SKATEboarding magazine production. The video, Hallelujah, was released to the public on July 28, 2010, and also featured professional skateboarders Ryan Decenzo, Pete Eldridge, Taylor Bingaman, and Tyler Bledsoe.

Pudwill's first full video part for Plan B, "Torey Pudwill's Big Bang!," was released on July 4, 2014, as a free DVD with an issue of Thrasher. The video was also released on the Thrasher website and YouTube channel, and as of December 2, 2014, the latter received over four million views.

On January 4, 2012, a teaser video was released, featuring Pudwill performing an upward tailslide to backside 270 flip out on a ledge, stating that the Plan B video is due for release in summer of 2013. The video is the first in a series of teasers that will be released during the period leading up to the video release date.

In October 2012, the DVS Shoe Company published a press release stating that Pudwill had signed a three-year contract. The press release revealed that the two signature shoes that Pudwill has released with the company have been among the brand's most popular. As of the press release date, Pudwill's third shoe model was in the process of being designed. Pudwill explained in a May 2013 interview:

I’ve been with DVS for a long time and it’s definitely part of my roots in skateboarding. DVS is a big part of me and we have a solid team and family there. We’re all really close and as a team we’re all really hyped on each other. I recently re-signed with them and we’re rebuilding with a solid crew especially with guys like Daewon and Chico. We’re all working tough towards new goals for the brand. It’s shoes and skateboarding, man. It’s sick.

Pudwill's part for the inaugural Plan B full-length video, True, was used as the concluding section. The video premiered on November 23, 2014, at the Ricardo Montalbán Theatre in Hollywood, California.

=== Sponsors ===
Pudwill's sponsors are: Plan B, Thank You Skate Co, Diamond Supply Co, Bones Bearings, Venture Trucks, Ghetto Child Wheels, Grizzly Grip, Happy Hour, Loud, Red Bull, Nike SB and Nixon Watches.

Pudwill's former sponsors are Shorty's, Plan B, Alien Workshop (flow), Chocolate (flow), Force Trucks, DVS Shoes, Almost, CCS, and Matix.

On January 2, 2016 Pudwill announced that he no longer rides for DVS Shoes leaving his 10 year venture with the company, now he rides for Diamond Footwear.

On October 19, 2018 Pudwill and Plan B announced his departure via Instagram. On May 5, 2026 Pudwill joined Plan B again, as it was published on Youtube.

== Contest history ==
Pudwill won the "Best Trick" title (while also finishing third in the overall ranking) at the 2011 Tampa Pro contest—held at the Skatepark of Tampa in Tampa, Florida, US—and finished in fifth position at the Seattle, US stop of the Street League Skateboarding competition of the same year. Pudwill then placed first at the 2012 Tampa Pro contest.

== Entrepreneur ==
Torey is the owner of Grizzly Griptape, which is distributed through Diamond Supply Company as of August 2012. He started the brand as a teenager, using a baking mold as the original inspiration for the logo design. As of March 2013, the company also manufactures apparel and accessories.

== Awards ==
In 2011, Pudwill received the "Street Skater of the Year" award from Transworld Skateboarding magazine. Following the announcement of the award, Transworld elaborated on the decision with a video segment that was published on its website—entitled "Why We Picked ...", the segment features interviews with Transworld staff members and other professional skateboarders.

== Influence ==
Following Pudwill's selection as Street Skater of the Year in 2011, professional skateboarder and entrepreneur Jeron Wilson stated: "I don't think you can say anything bad about Torey. He's one of those guys that's just, hands down, one of, like, the greatest skateboarders and the coolest dude. He's obviously an awesome skateboarder, but he's also an awesome human." Wilson's comments were compiled as part of the "Why We Picked ..." segment that was published on the Transworld website and editor of Transworld Kevin Duffel also contributed to the video:

I actually just read a bit online of someone saying that they're gonna call this era [2010s] the "Torey Pudwill Era". And, I mean, it's kind of funny when you think about it, but, at the same time, it's pretty true. It's, like, this dude is really changing the game for a lot of people. The amount of tech skill he has is definitely unmatched.

In terms of his own influences, Pudwill has spoken of Plan B cofounder and co-owner Danny Way in interviews and in 2013 explained: "Danny is tight. He’s awesome to kick it with and he can pretty much do whatever he wants. He’s Danny Way. He’s got that all access pass. Just to see the motivation and dedication he has to film for this video makes me want to never give up and film my part as if my life depended on it."

== Videography ==
- DVS: Skate More (2005)
- Shorty's: How To Go Pro (2005)
- DVS: European Vacation (2006)
- Jereme Rogers' Neighborhood (2006)
- Tampa Am Experience 2006 (2006)
- DVS: East Infection Tour (2007)
- DVS: Boyz N The Hood (2007)
- DVS: City of Dogs (2007)
- Matix: Ams Going Green Tour (2007)
- DVS: Summer Bailout Package (2008)
- Transworld: Skate & Create (2008)
- DVS: Dudes Dudes Dudes (2008)
- Proof (2009)
- Thrasher: Double Rock (2009)
- DVS: Videography Collection (2010)
- Transworld: Hallelujah (2010)
- Plan B: Torey Pudwill's Big Bang! (2011)
- DVS: Ill in Brazil (2013)
- Primitive: Pain Is Beauty (2013)
- Plan B: True
- DVS: Supernova (2014)
- DVS: Planes, Trains, And Automobiles Episode 3 (2014)
- We Are Blood (2015)
- iDabbleVM - Issue #1 (2021)
