= Game of Skate =

Skateboarding tricks game

SKATE, also known as the Game of Skate, is a skateboarding game where skaters attempt to perform each other's tricks in succession until all but one player is eliminated. It uses rules based upon the H.O.R.S.E. game played by basketball players. SKATE was first played in the 1970s by vertical skateboarders Lance Mountain, Neil Blender and John Lucero, and was then adopted by street skaters in the 1980s. In January, 2003 Eric Koston's éS Game of SKATE a professional invitational event, was held, and was the first tournament-style, head-to-head format event of its kind. Not long after, K5 Boardshop was the first organized amateur tournament for SKATE. The éS Game of SKATE tournament expanded globally in 2004 and has both professional and amateur divisions.

== Rules ==
One player sets a trick by doing a particular skateboarding trick of their choice. If the trick is not landed, or the board did not fully rotate, another player attempts to set a trick. Once a trick has been set (landed exactly), if the offensive player lands a trick in a line, the other player cannot do another trick within the line, the other player(s) must respond by doing the same trick in their first try. If they make it the game continues; If every one gets the trick the player who set it gets a point. If they miss it, they get a letter, starting with S, and so on, until they have missed five tricks, spelling SKATE, and they are out or the game is over. No trick may be set more than once in the same game and a skater defending on their last letter may receive two attempts at that trick. If the player lands the trick they have gained the lead and set the trick.

The last man standing is declared the winner and if they themselves did not receive a letter, then they are said to have "blanked, or "skunk'd" their opponent. When "Skater B" does not have the opportunity to set a single trick and does not match a single trick, "Skater A" is said to have committed a "Perfect Whitewash".

== Rules in Battle at the Berrics ==
Battle at the Berrics has a slightly altered version of the Game of SKATE rules used during battles held at the Berrics in Los Angeles, CA. As of Battle at the Berrics 13, their rules are:

Flat ground only, but, that does not mean everything on flat ground counts. No feet on the ground. That means no No Complys, no Handplants, no Bonelesses, no grabs, and no "Malto manual shit". No doing tricks that slide on the ground if your opponent popped their trick. If your opponent wraps their Impossible, you too must wrap your Impossible. Each skater gets one challenge flag. Last letter gets two tries. Offensive toe drag gets one do over. Defensive toe drag has a bigger margin of error, but will ultimately be decided by the referee.

== Team S.K.A.T.E. ==
"Team S.K.A.T.E", also called "Legion of Doom" is when there is one team of skateboarders competing against another team of skateboarders. One person from one team will set a trick. After that team fails to perform one of their tricks, the opposing team sets a trick. Once someone on Team A has set, when it is Team A's turn again a different person must set. Additionally, instead of individual people receiving letters, the team as a whole receives a letter.

== GOS from Skate Tricks. ==
In 2018, the Skate Tricks app adds the GOS game mode, the acronym for Game Of Skate. All you have to do is choose a number of players (from two), and then enter the first names of each skater. Once it's done, the app draws up a table with the names of each skateboarder, and the letters assigned to them. At the top, you can enter the current trick. If a player does not perform his trick correctly, it is possible to ask him to do it again with the whistle button.
