= Skatepark of Tampa =

Coordinates: 27°57′58.44″N 82°24′37.42″W

- Interactive map of Skatepark of Tampa
- Location: Tampa, Florida, United States
- Opened: December 28, 1992
- Website: spottampa.com

The Skatepark of Tampa is a skatepark in Tampa, Florida, United States. It is considered one of the top skateboarding venues on the East Coast of the United States. The name is often abbreviated as SPoT, and it is well known for its annual Tampa Am and Tampa Pro competitions.

== History ==
On December 28, 1992, SPoT was opened only to employees, and on January 2, 1993 the park officially opened to the public. The first pro contest was held April 1 & 2, 1995 and won by Mike Vallely.

On April 1, 2012, SPoT announced on its website that the park had been purchased (for US$9.3 million) by rapper Lil Wayne. It was revealed shortly afterwards that the fake press release was an April Fool's joke.

== Obstacles ==
The skatepark includes a terrain park-style "pro course", offering a pyramid, rails and transitions. Outside, there is a concrete transition course with a pizza oven. The "beginner's course" features many smaller rails and ramps to expand skateboarding skills and also includes the famous bowl.

The street skateboarding course is redesigned every year for the Tampa Pro and Tampa Am contest.

== Tampa Pro ==
Tampa Pro is an annual professional skateboard competition associated with the skatepark. Past winners of Tampa Pro are:

Year	Winner
1995	Mike Vallely
1996	Eric Koston
1997	Andrew Reynolds
1998	Andrew Reynolds
1999	Gershon Mosley
2000	Kerry Getz
2001	Kyle Berard
2002	Eric Koston
2003	Tony Trujillo
2004	Bastien Salabanzi
2005	Dennis Busenitz
2006	Greg Lutzka
2007	Eric Koston
2008	Greg Lutzka
2009	Greg Lutzka
2010	Paul Rodriguez
2011	Dennis Busenitz
2012	Torey Pudwill
2013	Luan Oliveira
2014	Nyjah Huston
2015	Luan Oliveira
2016	Shane O'Neill
2017	Louie Lopez
2018	Jagger Eaton
2019	Carlos Ribeiro
2020	Nyjah Huston
2021	Shane O'Neill
2022	Jamie Foy
2023	Yuto Horigome
2024	Yuto Horigome
2025	Sora Shirai
2026	Jagger Eaton

== Team ==
=== Skateboarding ===
Notable members include:

- Elissa Steamer
- Peter Kryger

== Music venue ==
The skatepark also doubles as a popular music venue. In 2012, SPoT hosted its 20-year anniversary event with performances from Souls of Mischief and Killer Mike.

The venue also hosts the Transitions Art Gallery music venue on its premises. TAG has served as a springboard for acoustic artists and other musicians. In December 2012, the owner of the Gallery announced he was stepping down and that the venue would be under new management from January 2013. The venue's new owners subsequently announced that the name of the venue would change to Epic Problem. Epic Problem hosts many shows from many post-hardcore bands and one annual show from the nonprofit high school (mainly from Hillsborough High School) sketch comedy troupe On The Brink.

In July 2016, Epic Problem held its last show and passed the torch to King State coffee, owned by Tim McTague, of Underoath and Nate Young, of Anberlin, who use the space for brewing.

In March 2017, the SPoT Snack Bar was expanded and reconstructed into a full-fledged music venue and renamed "Transitions". It is complete with stage, lighting, sound system and newly rebuilt bar. Transitions held its first show during the 23rd Annual Tampa Pro contest that featured the music of Ray Barbee.

== Popular culture ==
The skatepark is a major feature in the Tony Hawk's Underground video game, and SPoT employees appear as competitors in the street and vertical contests. The skatepark also served as an exclusive competition level in Tony Hawk's Pro Skater 2x.

SPoT appeared on the MTV series Rob & Big that featured professional skateboarder and entrepreneur Rob Dyrdek.

In August 2011, Lil Wayne stopped by SPoT for a private after hours session. He has attended every Tampa Pro contest since, often spectating from the judges' booth.

In May 2004, comedian Dave Chappelle set up an after hours session with some of his friends while on tour in Tampa.
