= Colin McKay =

Canadian professional skateboarder (born 1975)

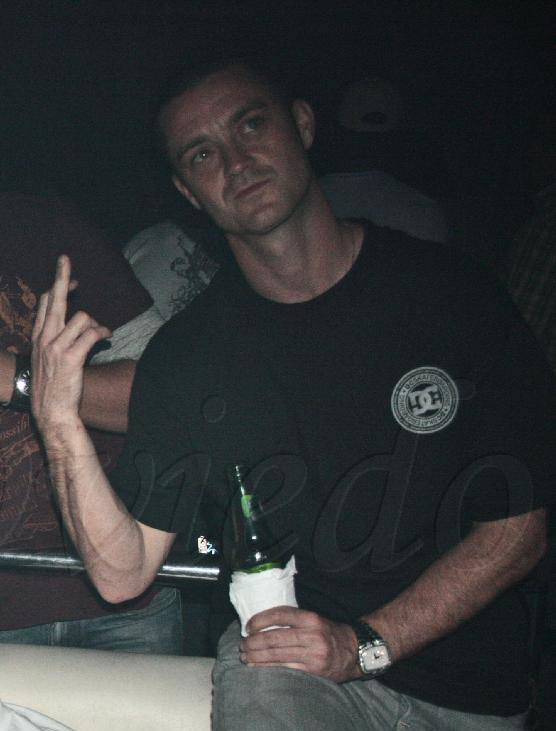
- McKay in 2007

Personal information
- Full name: Colin McKay
- Nickname: Col
- Born: August 29, 1975 (age 51) Saskatoon, Saskatchewan, Canada

Sport
- Sport: Skateboarding
- Event: Vert
- Turned pro: 1992

Colin McKay (born August 29, 1975) is a Canadian professional skateboarder who is widely recognized for his involvement with the original Plan B Skateboards "superteam" as well as the subsequent relaunch of the brand in 2005.

== Early life ==
McKay was born in Saskatoon, Saskatchewan, and was raised in North Vancouver, British Columbia. He attended Cleveland Elementary School then on to Handsworth Secondary School.

== Professional skateboarding ==
=== Plan B ===
Along with close colleague, Danny Way, McKay was a member of the original Plan B skateboarding team, formed in 1991. He stayed with the group until their disbandment in 1998.

After several years with Girl Skateboards, McKay revived Plan B in 2005. At that point, McKay and Way became the leaders of the brand.

=== Girl ===
Following the eventual dissolution of the original incarnation of Plan B, McKay subsequently joined the Girl skateboard team in 1998. McKay explained to Canadian skateboard magazine SBC, in 2011, "it just so happened that a lot of those guys on Girl were my friends; guys I've been around through my existence in skateboarding. I had just gotten on Girl around '98, when I was about 21. It was cool to be a part of one of the Girl/Chocolate videos ... To me, those videos are a big part of skateboarding, and it would've been rad to be around and take part in the skits and stuff that they do." McKay appeared in the Chocolate video, The Chocolate Tour, shortly after his arrival on the team and pre-existing footage was used for the part. In 2001, Colin went on tour with Tony Hawk on his Gigantic Skatepark Tour which was broadcast on the ESPN networks.

=== Seek ===
After leaving Girl, McKay joined a company that was formed under DNA Distribution called "Seek"—founded by Rob Dyrdek and Josh Kalis, McKay rode alongside other skateboarders, such as Florentine Marfaing, Alex Carolino, Mike Taylor, and Greg Myers, during his time with Seek. Colin was featured in the video game Evolution Skateboarding.

=== Relaunch of Plan B ===
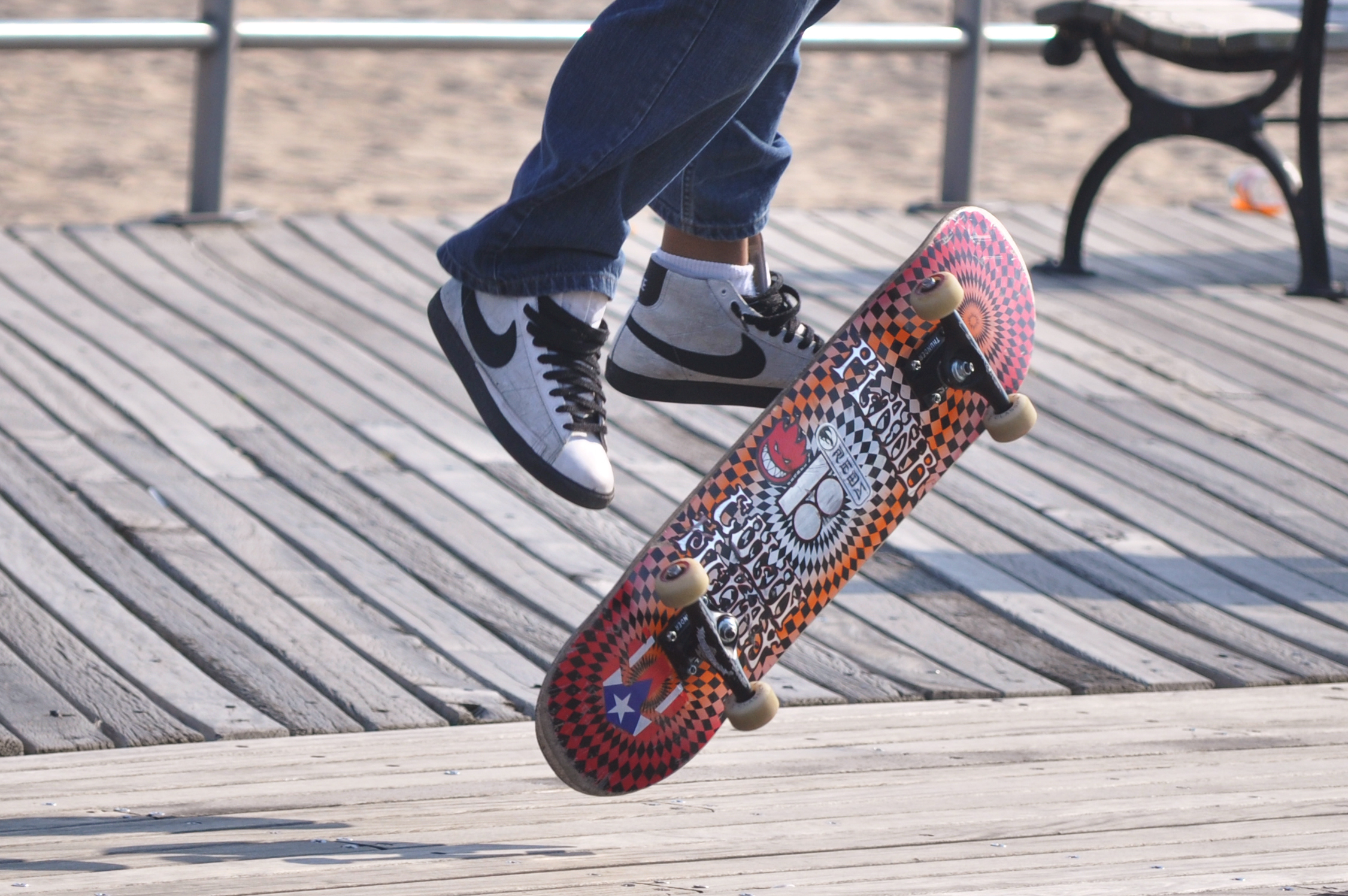
Plan B Skateboards's McKay signature board.

Around the year 2005, rumours had emerged regarding the resurrection and relaunch of Plan B by both Way and McKay. Second-phase team member, Paul Rodriguez, has referred to this period as a time when Way and McKay were talking about "bringing back the dream; awakening the giant." Fellow recruit, and professional skateboarder for Plan B, PJ Ladd, has stated, "I had heard about it. That there was like a rumor that Plan B was maybe gonna come back and I think it had gotten around how much a fan of it I was as a kid."

In 2005, with the financial backing of Syndrome Distribution, Way and McKay reformed Plan B Skateboards, maintaining their roles as company co-owners, as well as professional skaters. Way has explained, "For the sake of what we were a part of, I think Colin and I, you know, didn't want to let go of the formula that gave us the motivation that pumped out all of those videos and stuff that we were able to pump out." Way has revealed that, while he and McKay are the co-owners of the relaunched company, they have adopted the business model that they learnt of from Ternasky during his time running the first phase of the company.

On January 4, 2012, a teaser video was released, featuring Plan B team member, Torey Pudwill, performing a back tailslide-to-kick flip-out up a stair ledge, stating that the Plan B video is due for release in summer of 2013. The video is the first in a series of teasers that will be released during the period leading up to the video release date.

In 2021, McKay launched a new skateboard design that paid homage to his Vancouver roots, taken from the "Flying-V" Canucks jerseys of the late-70's.

== Influence and recognition ==
During a tour of Australia, McKay performed a trick known as a "backside tailslide" at the Pizzey skate park in the state of Queensland—John Cardiel stated in a 2011 interview with Australian skateboarding magazine SLAM, "That was the sickest thing I had ever seen at Pizzey".

== Red Dragons ==
Together with Moses Itkonen and Robert "Sluggo" Boyce, McKay formed the Red Dragons skateboard crew.

== Videography ==
- Powell Peralta: Public Domain (1988)
- Powell Perlata: Ban This (1989)
- Powell Peralta: Propaganda (1990)
- Powell: Eight (1991)
- Powell: Celebrity Tropical Fish (1991)
- Plan B: Questionable (1992)
- Plan B: Virtual Reality (1993)
- 411VM: Issue 5 (1994)
- Plan B: Second Hand Smoke (1994)
- Las Vegas Pro Vert '96 (1996)
- Plan B: The Revolution (1997)
- Transworld: The Reason (1999)
- Chocolate: The Chocolate Tour (1999)
- Tony Hawk's Gigantic Skatepark Tour (2001)
- Red Dragon: RDS/FSU/2002 (2002)
- DC: The DC Video (2003)
- Transworld: Show Me The Way (2004)
- Skull Skates: Resist Control (2004)
- Red Dragon: Skateboard Party (2005)
- Plan B: Live After Death (2006)
- DC: King of Barcelona (2007)
- DC: King of New York (2007)
- Plan B: Plan B In Dominican Republic (2008)
- DC: Live From Europe (2008)
- Plan B: SuperFuture (2008)
- Plan B: Plan B In Moscow, Russia (2009)
- Plan B: Plan B In Arizona (2009)

== Video game appearances ==
McKay is a playable character in the Electronic Arts video games: Skate, Skate 2 and Skate 3. He also appeared in Evolution Skateboarding and MTV Sports: Skateboarding Featuring Andy Macdonald.
