= DVS Shoes =

American footwear and clothing company

- Industry: Footwear
- Founded: 1995; 31 years ago
- Founder: Kevin Dunlap; Winston Dunlap
- Fate: Acquired by Elan-Polo International, Inc. in 2021
- Headquarters: United States
- Products: Sneakers, t-shirts, hats
- Parent: Elan-Polo International, Inc.
- Website: www.dvsshoes.com

DVS Shoes is an American footwear and clothing company that specialises in products for skateboarding, moto, bmx, mtb and snowboarding. The company defines itself as "... driven from the pursuit of building product that embodies the sports the company athletes breathe every day. With roots deeply embedded in skate, the company has the platform to develop truly technological products that bring the riders personalities to life."

== History ==
DVS was founded in 1995 by Kevin Dunlap, his father Winston and soon joined by brothers Brian, Mike and Tim Gavin —The distribution company called Podium Distribution was formed once the Lakai Limited Footwear and Matix clothing brand were created.

=== 2012 onwards ===
From October 2012, DVS continued to expand its skateboarding team, signing amateur skater Zack Wallin, and embarked on a tour of Detroit, US. A photograph captured during the Detroit tour appeared as the cover for The Skateboard Mag in early 2013—the photograph features Song executing a trick on a non-typical industrial structure.

In the first half of 2013, the company launched an upgraded website that features an online store. During this period the skateboard team toured Brazil, South America and Dallas, US while Song released his thirteenth signature shoe model with the brand.

Jon Nguyen was officially welcomed to the skate team on July 2, 2013 and a welcome video was published on the company's Vimeo channel in late June 2013. Nguyen's introduction also served as the inaugural promotion of a new technology for the brand called "Vaporcell", featured in a new "Vapor" skate shoe model.

A review by the "Ripped Laces" website, published in September 2013, ranked the Vaporcell technology highly for its comfort, board feel and durability, concluding: " It’s a stylish shoe with some great impact technology & stability." Using 20 hours of skateboarding as a guide for its review, the foremost concern that arose for Ripped Laces was the fading of the shoe sole's grip after a two-week period. The New Zealand skateboard magazine Manual published a review in October 2013 and also commended the Vaporcell model: "The Vapor fits well and offers great support, there’s no sloppy side walls so your feet definitely wont be sliding around inside of these."

In the second half of 2013, the DVS skate team completed tours of Canada, and New York City, US. In early 2014, the skate team completed a tour of Peru, South America where they were invited to Hensley's Bar, an alcohol venue that housed a skateboard ramp and skateboard memorabilia.

The skate shoe department continued to develop further in early 2014, with a preview by Pudwill of his third signature shoe model on social media. Pudwill explained that the "Pudwill 3" will be available at the time of the Plan B Skateboards debut video premiere in November 2014. He stated on April 23, 2014: "Putting in work in the #torey3s for the #planbvideo coming in Nov! You ready?"

Also in April 2014, DVS released the "Wee Man" signature colorway of the "Jarvis" model, designed by Jason "Wee Man" Acuña—Acuna appeared in the 1990s skate magazine Big Brother and starred in the magazine's video Shit; he then garnered further public attention in the Jackass productions. In its promotion for the shoe, which was accompanied by a video directed by former Big Brother photo editor Rick Kosick, the brand explained:

Wee Man has been with DVS for over 10 years, and we're honored to release his second signature colorway. Inspired by his 1962 Impala, the suede Jarvis is full of details that Wee Man personally selected for style and functionality.

A collaboration with the Cliché Skateboards company was launched in July 2014, with a skate shoe/skateboard deck capsule for professional team rider Flo Mirtain—the "Jarvis" model was redesigned for the capsule. A video part of Mirtain skateboarding in Europe was also released to commemorate the collaboration. Also in July 2014, the DVS skateboard team embarked on the "Planes, Trains and Automobiles" European tour, with Pudwill, Song, Tolentino, Murawski, Nguyen, Wallin, Mirtain, Shier, Louis Taubert and Adrien Coillard in attendance.

=== Chapter 11 filing ===
In May 2012, DVS Shoes filed bankruptcy, citing increased costs in China (where the brand's products are manufactured) and the general downturn in retail sales due to the 2008 financial crisis as the reasons for the filing. Shortly afterwards in 2013, DVS was acquired by the Sequential Brands Group and resumed normal operations, signing new sponsorship agreements with motocross rider Brian Deegan and professional skateboarders Torey Pudwill and Song. On August 31, 2021, DVS' parent company, Sequential Brands, filed for Chapter 11 bankruptcy protection, marking DVS’ second bankruptcy filing in less than 10 years. In 2021, DVS Shoes was sold to Elan-Polo International, Inc..

== Videography ==
- 2005: Skate More
- 2006: European Vacation
- 2007: East Infection Tour
- 2007: Boyz N The Hood
- 2007: City of Dogs
- 2007: Catching Up With Keith
- 2008: Summer Bailout Package
- 2008: Dudes Dudes Dudes
- 2010: Videography Collection
- 2011: Total Eclipse Of The Heartland (with Matix)
- 2011: New Year's Dae (with Almost)
- 2013: DVS Does Detroit
- 2013: Ill In Brazil
- 2013: DVS Does Dallas
