= Shane O'Neill (skateboarder) =

Australian skateboarder (born 1990)

Personal information
- Full name: Shane O'Neill
- Born: 3 January 1990 (age 36) Werribee, Victoria, Australia
- Height: 5 ft 10 in (178 cm)
- Weight: 170 lb (77 kg)

Sport
- Country: Australia
- Sport: Skateboarding
Medal record
Men's street skateboarding
Representing Australia
World Championships
Gold medal – first place	2016 Los Angeles	Street
Silver medal – second place	2010	Street
Silver medal – second place	2017 Los Angeles	Street

Shane O'Neill aka Nugget (born 3 January 1990) is an Australian professional skateboarder from Melbourne, Victoria. Shane is a member of the SLS "9 Club" meaning he has landed a trick in the Street League competition that judges scored an average of 9 or better. Shane's trick was a switch 360 double kickflip. Shane is one of only few skateboarders to win gold in all four major skateboarding contests the X Games, Street League Skateboarding, Tampa Pro (skateboard competition) and World Skateboarding Championship. His normal stance is Goofy.

Shane O’Neill began his skateboarding journey at the age of 10, and by the age of 13, he had secured his first professional sponsorships. He is recognized for his remarkable technical skills, a trait that has consistently placed him in the finals of skateboarding competitions around the globe.

In 2021, O'Neill qualified for the 2020 Tokyo Summer Olympics in the street skateboarding competition. He competed in the men's street event at the 2020 Tokyo Olympics. He was ranked sixteenth in the Preliminary Heats and therefore did not compete in the finals. Full details are in Australia at the 2020 Summer Olympics.

== Sponsors ==
Shane O'Neill has been sponsored since the age of 14. He is currently sponsored by April Skateboards, Nike SB, Thunder Trucks, Villager, Diamond Supply & Co. and Spitfire Wheels. O'Neill was previously sponsored by Primitive Skateboarding, and Skate Mental.

== April Skateboards ==
On the 8th of June 2018, O'Neill announced via his Instagram that he would be leaving Primitive to start his own skateboard company. On the 5th of May 2019, O'Neill announced via Instagram that his new company was called April Skateboards.

As of 2024, the team consists of Shane O'Neill, Guy Mariano, Yuto Horigome, Ish Cepeda, Rayssa Leal, Noah Nayef, Ronnie Kessner, Kai Kishi, Chloe Cavell and Dashawn Jordan.

== Notable tricks ==
In Shane's 2015 "Shane Goes Skate Mental" video part, Shane performed a nollie backside heelflip down the steps at Wallenberg. This is one of the most difficult tricks a skateboarder has done at this location.
