= Plan B Skateboards =

Skateboard company

- Industry: Skateboarding
- Founded: 1991
- Headquarters: San Diego California
- Website: www.planbskateboards.com

Plan B Skateboards is a skateboarding company based in San Diego, California, United States, founded by Mike Ternasky, Danny Way and Colin McKay. Plan B has been manufacturing and selling premium skateboard hard goods and apparel since 1991.

== History ==
=== 1991–1993: Formation, Ternasky's "super team", Questionable ===
The original Plan B Skateboarding team was founded in 1991 by Mike Ternasky who had departed from the H-Street company that he had formerly managed with Tony Magnusson. Ternasky, to the dismay of Magnusson, also managed to convince numerous team riders to assist with the development of the new brand. The company was formed as part of the Dwindle Distribution company, at that time overseen by Steve Rocco and Rodney Mullen, and Mike's intention was to create a "super team", with riders such as Way, McKay, Mullen, Mike Carroll, Matt Hensley, and Rick Howard.

Rocco explained in a 2012 interview that "The story of Plan B is a difficult one to tell. Everybody, you know, had a different idea of what Plan B was, or was to become, depending on, you know, Mike's vision that he was giving you at the time." Ternasky's intentions have been compared to the "Dream Team" concept that came to fruition in the American professional basketball league, the NBA. At that time, riders were progressing at such a rapid pace that Mike was able to draw upon a pioneering movement to fulfill his aspirations. For example, Way quit his position on the Powell-Peralta team, a decision for a professional skateboarder at the time due to the reputation of the company, due to the inability of the company to support his rate of development. Ternasky was dissatisfied with the skateboarding industry at the time, an industry primarily composed of older business owners who were no longer directly involved with skateboarding, and proceeded to initiate a "rebirth" of the industry, providing the team riders in his new company with a level of freedom that had not been witnessed up until the formation of Plan B. Rocco further explained, "People just wanted to be a part of it because it was so rad."

After forming the foundations of the Plan B company, Ternasky proceeded to exert a potent influence upon the team riders, with Mullen's relationship with Ternasky of particular significance. At the time, the origins and defining core of Mullen's skateboarding, freestyle skateboarding, was losing popularity at a rapid rate and Mullen was forced to seriously consider the viability of his future as a professional skateboarder. Both Stacy Peralta and Rocco had attempted to persuade Mullen to adapt to street-style skateboarding, but he was initially resistant; however, Ternasky expressed to Rocco that he believed that he could facilitate the transition, but Rocco replied, "Yeah right! You'll never get him to be able to do that stuff." However, a strong bond developed between the two and photographer, Jacob Rosenberg, explains, "So, what happened with Mike and Rodney was that he saw something in Rodney, and he made a couple of comments, and I think he saw like, "Holy shit, he could really do this if he committed to it.'" Mullen subsequently filmed street-style parts for three videos, Questionable (1992), Second Hand Smoke (1993), and Virtual Reality (premiered June 11, 1993 at La Jolla Museum of Contemporary arts), while Ternasky was at the helm of the company. Mullen also introduced two newly invented tricks in Questionable, the kickflip underflip and the casper slide. Rocco expressed the belief that Ternasky's work with Mullen was "just flat-out amazing" and "changed everything".

Former team rider Sean Sheffey has described his relationship with Ternasky in the following manner: If there was something that we were having a problem with, you know, sit down and speak with us about these things and "Why isn't this going on?", or "What's the problem here?", or "You need to get this out of your life". It's like a real steady father-figure, boss, big brother, you know, really great man. Professional skateboarder Pat Duffy who, like McKay and Way, was a member of the original team and has continued on as a Plan B rider for the company's second phase has maintained Ternasky's influence throughout his entire career, stating:

I was always, like, nervous, like, what if, what do people think of me? Look at all these people look at me, I can't, I couldn't deal with it, you know? You know, he would like take me aside and calm me down, and "Listen man, all you gotta do is just go do what you do. Don't worry about, you know?" And it was just like, you know, I've held onto that for years, you know, for a long time.

At the time of the release of the Questionable video in 1992, the Plan B team consisted of Rodney Mullen, Danny Way, Colin McKay, Rick Howard, Mike Carroll, Matt Hensley, Pat Duffy, Ryan Fabry, Sean Sheffey, and Sal Barbier. Upon the release of Virtual Reality in the following year, Tony Ferguson and Aaron Artis were added to the team. Second Hand Smoke, the final video of the Ternasky era, saw the addition of Jeremy Wray, Pat Channita, and Ronnie Bertino to the team, following the departure of Howard, Carroll, Sheffey, and Hensley.

=== 1994–1997: Ternasky's death, Revolution ===
In 1994 Ternasky was killed in a car accident, leaving the ownership of the company mainly in the hands of Johnson with some of the ownership going to Way, McKay, and Michael Ternasky's wife. The group decided to temporarily shelve both the company and the team in 1998 following a period of gradual dissolution. McKay has explained, "That was just the end of that Plan B right there. Everything that happened after that, until it was, like, laid to rest for just a minute, was, to me, just doesn't really count. It just wasn't the same, trying to run Plan B, skate at the same time, and, be that young. It was just, you know, it was a tough thing."

Ternasky's death was an incredibly significant event for both the skateboarding community and those people who were intensively involved with the Plan B brand; Danny Way stated in a December 2012 interview, "Mike was always like a brother to me. He definitely instilled in me a lot of stuff that will be permanently in my mind. When I'm really pushing myself sometimes, I have to remember sometimes, like, you know, I really will bring him up in my head and remember certain things he used to say to me and, and, that's, you know, sometimes how I get shit done." Mullen has also spoken publicly about his relationship with Ternasky and explained in a 2002 interview, "He was such a great person. He would lift you so high and that is why Plan B was what it was. And it was clear once Mike was gone that it was never the same."

A fourth Plan B video was produced in 1997, entitled The Revolution, featuring Johnson, Way, McKay, and Mullen, but this was the final video project associated with the first phase of the company. The team roster for The Revolution video was: Rodney Mullen, Danny Way, Colin McKay, Rick McCrank, Brian Emmers, Matt Hensley, Pat Channita, Pat Duffy, and Jeremy Wray.

=== 2005–2010: Relaunch, Billabong deal ===
Around the year 2005, rumors had emerged regarding the resurrection and relaunch of Plan B by both Way and McKay. Second-phase team member Paul Rodriguez has referred to this period as a time when Way and McKay were talking about "bringing back the dream; awakening the giant." Fellow recruit, and professional skateboarder for Plan B, PJ Ladd, has stated, "I had heard about it. That there was like a rumor that Plan B was maybe gonna come back and I think it had gotten around how much a fan of it I was as a kid."

In 2005, with the financial backing of Syndrome Distribution, Way and McKay reformed Plan B Skateboards, maintaining their roles as company co-owners, as well as professional skaters. Way has explained, "For the sake of what we were a part of, I think Colin and I, you know, didn't want to let go of the formula that gave us the motivation that pumped out all of those videos and stuff that we were able to pump out." Way has revealed that, while he and McKay are the co-owners of the relaunched company, they have adopted the business model that they learnt of from Ternasky during his time running the first phase of the company.

Following the re-recruiting of original team rider Duffy, Rodriguez, Ladd, and Ryan Gallant were the recruited riders from the contemporary skateboarding generation. Rodriguez has explained: "The way I looked at it, Danny Way himself called me and asked me to ride for this company that he spent his career and put his hobby on the line for ... He's putting trust in me to continue that legacy. That's huge. That's an honor. I don't even know what I could compare that to. That's the highest compliment someone could receive. For me, it just felt right."

Ryan Sheckler, who has referred to Way as a "legend in every aspect of skateboarding, and one of the main dudes I look up to in my life.", was then recruited, followed by Brian Wenning. The initial amateur rider who was recruited was Ronson Lambert; following Lambert's departure, Felipe Gustavo, a then-unknown skateboarder from Brazil, and Scott Decenzo were recruited in 2010. In November 2012, in response to a question asking whether he has been surprised by the relaunch, Rocco replied: "Am I surprised that Plan B got resurrected? No, not at all. I mean, the potential, it's, you, know, it's always been there; it's just, you know, how do you harness it, and focus it, and then move it forward. And hopefully they can, you know, carry on, like, Mike's legacy for him."

Torey Pudwill, at that time, was with Almost Skateboards, the company that he had achieved professional status with. He was recruited to the professional ranks of the re-launched company in 2010, following the departure of professional riders Wenning and Gallant. As of December 2012, Wenning co-owns and rides for Lockdown Skateboards and Gallant is a professional rider for Expedition Skateboards.

On March 5, 2010, Billabong International Limited confirmed an exclusive ten-year licensing agreement with Plan B. Paul Naude who at the time was President of Billabong North America, stated, "Plan B is an authentic, progressive brand and this arrangement will allow its management to focus on its core capabilities while leveraging the global infrastructure of the Billabong group". At the core of the deal was the unification of the Element and Plan B brands under the Branch Distribution company, but after an initial website launch, the company did not develop further in the public realm and a website did not exist at the beginning of 2014. In late March 2010, the brand also announced a partnership with the Paul Schmitt Stix Factory for the manufacturing of its skateboard decks.

=== 2010 onward: New ownership, Rodriguez's departure, Branch distribution, True ===
In March 2012, Brian Johnson gave part of the Plan B Skateboard company to his son, Morgan Johnson. After about a year of success, Morgan brought his friends, Ramy and Mark Farah into the company and in recent years, the company has developed new headquarters in Landover, Maryland. In early 2013, a bidding process for Billabong continued following the company's collapse during the 2008 financial crisis and a failed expansion into the retail industry. As of April 10, 2013, a AUD287 million offer from a consortium was under consideration by the owners of Billabong, but the proposal remained conditional.

The inaugural Plan B full-length video has been a topic of discussion among the global skateboarding community for a prolonged duration of time, as promotional footage has been released (entitled Superfuture) and the company has been in existence for a significant period of time, with a renowned team established during this time period. A late-November episode of the internet-based, weekly program, Skateline, broadcast on the Thrasher Magazinechannel, showed footage of company co-owner and team rider, Danny Way, stating that the video would be made according to a schedule determined by the company regardless of external pressure. Way is filmed speaking directly to the camera, in response to Gary Rogers, the host of the program: "Gary, you need to chill out man. Gary, you need to chill the fuck out. We're gonna drop this video when we say we're gonna drop it."

Veteran professional skateboarder, Chris Miller, has stated: "They're filming a video part every time they go out on the weekend to a contest. Now you gotta go out and do it in the street. Now you gotta go out and do it on a level that, like, way above and beyond that. So it's gotta be tough; it's gotta be, it's gotta be really hard. But I think that this is the crew to do it." In regard to the Plan B team (as of December 2012) and the filming of the video, McKay has stated: "They're just so self-motivated man. Like, if we're together, great, we'll all do our thing and go somewhere and film; and like, if they're on their own, everyone has their own program that they're on. You just know that everyone's handling business wherever they are."

Way explained in December 2012:

With the history, or the legacy, of our prior videos, and being Questionable, our first video, we haven't had a full-length video with our team and I think our team is a team that would mirror the team we had originally when we launched Plan B, but in a modern-day way. I might be crazy, but I think we do have the formula to make a video that should be historical like the original Plan B video was.

On January 4, 2013, a teaser video was released, featuring Pudwill performing an upward tailslide-to-kick flip-out on a ledge, stating that the Plan B video is due for release in summer of 2013. The video is the first in a series of teasers that will be released during the period leading up to the video release date.

In late February 2014, Sheckler posted a picture on Instagram of the whole team standing together captioned: "Vid coming out Nov 2014". Director of the video, Erik Bragg, participated in an interview with Red Bull on July 18, 2014 and confirmed the completion of the video: "We’re almost done, I promise. Nobody wants this video out faster than we do, trust me. The good news is we've never stopped working hard. The deadline moved, and we just kept stacking tricks." Bragg also stated that the team has filmed in every continent except for Africa and Antarctica.

As a guest on the radio show "Big Boi is in the Neighborhood", broadcast on Los Angeles' Power 106FM, Rodriguez confirmed his departure from Plan B in an interview that was published on the Internet on July 30, 2013. Prior to the confirmation, widespread speculation emerged in regard to Rodriguez's departure. During his winning performance at Stop 5 of the 2013 Street League Skateboarding contest in Portland, Oregon, U.S., Rodriguez rode a skateboard deck with the Plan B logo painted over and the company's logo was removed from his personal website as of July 16, 2013. Rodriguez explained in the interview that he is seeking to "own a little bit more of myself."

Johnny Schillereff, founder of the Element brand, announced the revival of the Branch distribution company in April 2014, stating:

The Branch will offer premium brands such while also curating exclusive, limited collaborations and collections ... Our entire campus - exterior and interior - is built for skaters by skaters, with carefully considered, reclaimed and recycled ingredients. Truly conscious by nature in our choice of materials and those that construct it.

The image that was published with the announcement featured the logos of Element, Plan B and the Grizzly griptape brand owned by Pudwill. Branch's premises will be located in Costa Mesa, California, US and at the time of the announcement on April 14, a website was not launched.

The trailer and official title for the long-awaited second-phase Plan B video was published online on July 10, 2014. Titled True, the video's trailer was accompanied by the hashtag "PlanBTRUE."

As of October 14, 2014, the official release date for the Plan B True video was announced as December 2, 2014, on Pudwill's Instagram account. Thrasher Magazine's Instagram account then relayed Pudwill's picture, in which he is holding a skateboard deck that reads "B True" with "12-2-14" on the bottom in permanent marker. The theater premiere of the film was held at the Ricardo Montalban Theater in California, U.S., on November 23, 2014, with Ternasky's daughter, Michaela Holland, in attendance. Way explained to the media that new rider Chris Joslin will be the "most talked-about skateboarder in skateboarding, immediately" after the general release of the video in December.

September 10, 2015 Plan B announced that Chris Joslin is on the professional team.

In January 2013, Way provided his perspective on the company's team in an interview for the online magazine, Jenkem:

"They are doing the best tricks consistently with every variation of it down the biggest stuff. And it doesn’t take them long, so they have a lot of it. For example when we went to China recently, Sheckler alone has more footage from his 1 trip than all of the Girl team from their China trips combined. I’m not trying to diss on Girl, just trying to put it in perspective, what I think his strengths are. Torey same thing."

== Team ==
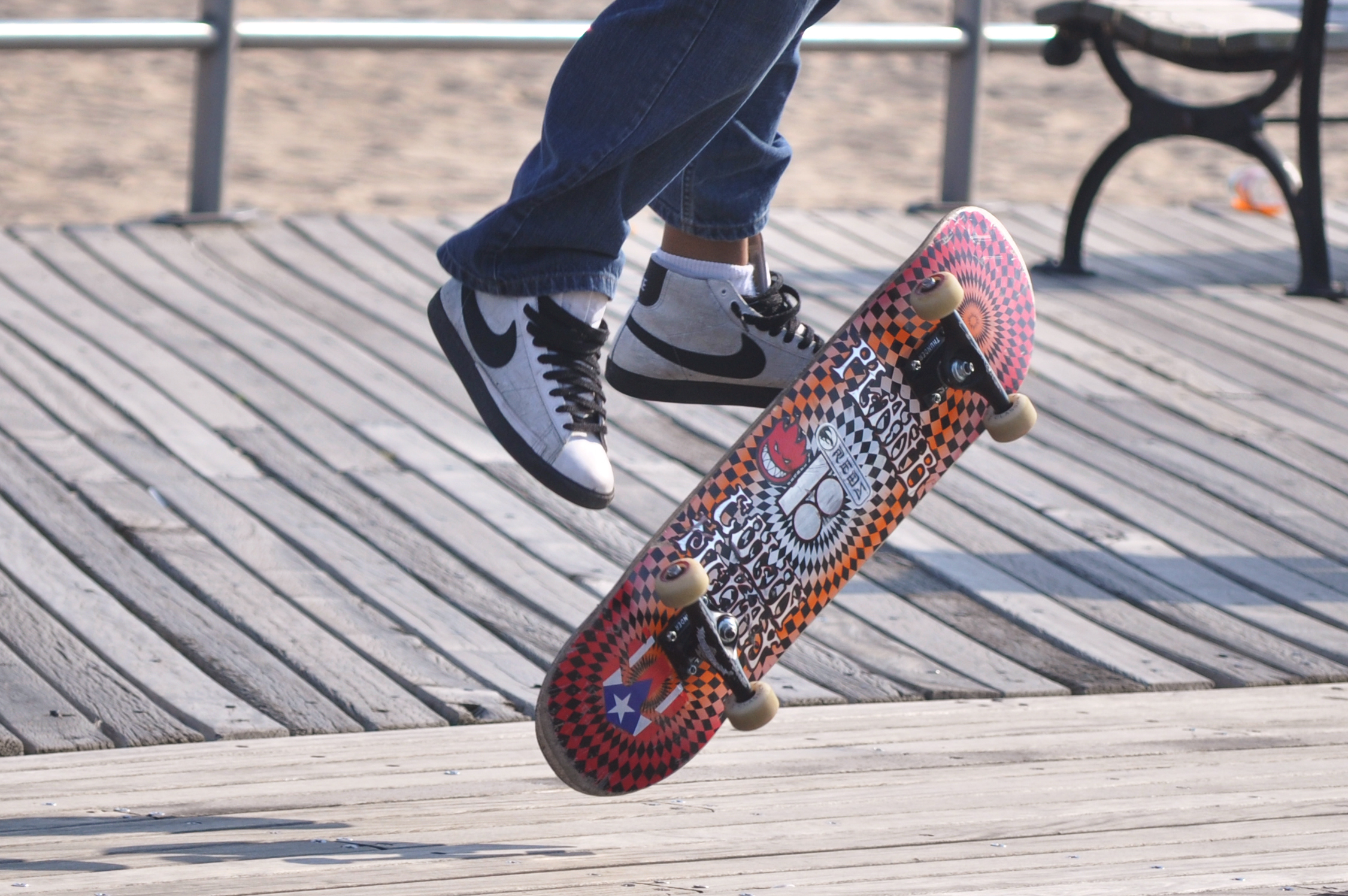
Plan B's Colin McKay signature skateboard.

=== Professional ===
- Danny Way
- PJ Ladd
- Felipe Gustavo
- Colin McKay
- Pat Duffy
- Sean Sheffey
- Chris Joslin
- Trevor McClung
- Aurélien Giraud
- Tommy Fynn
- Torey Pudwill

=== Amateur ===
- Kristion Jordan
- Santana Saldana
- Noe Solis
- Brandon Snider

=== Former ===
- Rick McCrank
- Caine Gayle
- Ryan Gallant
- Jereme Rogers
- Paul Rodriguez (skateboarder)
- Rodney Mullen
- Ryan Sheckler
- Darrell Stanton
- Chris Cole
- Leticia Bufoni
- Rick Howard
- Mike Carroll (skateboarder)
- Sal Barbier
- Tony Ferguson (skateboarder)
- Jeremy Wray
- Brian Wenning
- Brian Emmers
- Pat Channita
- Matt Hensley
- Ryan Fabry
- Ronnie Bertino
- Scott Decenzo
