= PJ Ladd =

American skateboarder (born 1983)

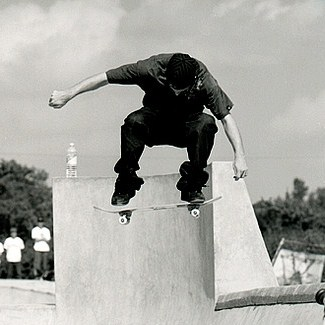
- Ladd in June 2007 in Saffron Walden, England for the Plan B demo
- Born: Patrick John Ladd; January 11, 1983 (age 43); Rockland, Massachusetts
- Occupation: Skateboarder

Patrick John Ladd, now known as Antanjeet Singh (born January 11, 1983), is an American professional skateboarder whose stance is regular. Ladd was labelled an "east coast legend" by fellow professional skateboarder and team manager John Rattray in May 2013.

== Early life ==
Ladd was born in Rockland, Massachusetts and grew up in Boston. Ladd revealed in a 2013 interview that skateboarding was a prominent aspect of his childhood in Boston: "I would skate my box and flatbar in the warehouse next to my father's auto parts store and then take the train into downtown to skate. Before that I skated this concrete stage in the high school parking lot. And before that, just in front of my house. It was good." Also in the 2013 interview, Ladd explained that his upbringing strengthened his character and stated that he is "grateful" for his upbringing, even though it was difficult, "because it made me [Ladd] who I am."

Although Ladd was well known in the local Boston skateboarding scene before he headlined the Coliseum Skateshop's video PJ Ladd's Wonderful Horrible Life, it was his part in the 2002 shop video that catapulted him to the attention of the skateboard industry.

== Professional skateboarding ==
Before he joined the Flip Skateboards brand, where he became a professional rider, Ladd was an amateur for Element Skateboards through the assistance of professional skateboarder Donny Barley. In Flip's second film of the Sorry trilogy Really Sorry, Ladd's video part does not feature an accompanying soundtrack and a title card that reads "Silence is Golden" prefaces the part.

Alongside professional skateboarders such as Paul Rodriguez, Ryan Gallant, and Pat Duffy, Ladd joined the reformed Plan B Skateboards company. Ladd can be seen in the Plan B promotional video Superfuture.

In addition to professional skateboarders Arto Saari, Levi Brown, and Tom Karangelov, Ladd is a team member of the inaugural "NB#" ("New Balance Numeric") skateboard team that is owned by the New Balance shoe company. With American origins in the capital city of Boston, Massachusetts, New Balance was considered an appropriate fit for Ladd, as he is a native of the state. Ladd stated following the announcement of the brand's team: "I believe in New Balance being a no bullshit shoe brand from Boston that successful and makes great shoes. I think it has a lot to add."

Ladd was a competitor in the 2013 Munich, Germany X Games "Real Street" event, in which the competitors' tailored video parts are voted on by the public. Ladd's opponent in the opening round was Austyn Gillette and his video part consists of tricks performed on benches, ledges, and picnic tables.

=== Sponsors ===
- Bones Wheels
- Venture
- Jessup Griptape
- Bones Bearings

== Video game appearances ==
Ladd appears in the Electronic Arts video games Skate, Skate 2, and Skate 3.

== Contest history ==
Ladd won the Battle at the Berrics V competition after defeating Mike Mo Capaldi in the championship round. For the sixth BATB contest, Ladd qualified for the championship battle against Paul Rodriguez and won the competition for a second successive year.

== Personal life ==
As of May 2013, Ladd divides his time between his home state of Massachusetts and Los Angeles, California, U.S. During his time away from skateboarding, Ladd reads and engages in "recharge time."

By 2024, he had converted to Sikhism and changed his name to Antanjeet Singh.

== Videography ==
- The Coliseum Video (1999)
- 411VM Issue #37 (1999)
- Digital Skateboarding #2 (2000)
- Zoo York: E.S.T. (2000)
- Logic #4 (2000)
- 411VM Issue #40 (2000)
- 411VM Issue #44 (2001)
- 411VM Issue #45 (2001)
- 411VM Best of #8 (2001)
- Big Brother: Crap (2001)
- ON Video Magazine: Spring (2001)
- Monkey Business: Project of a Lifetime (2001)
- Coliseum: PJ Ladd's Wonderful Horrible Life (2002)
- éS: Germany Tour (2002)
- Thrasher: King Of The Road 2003 (2003)
- Flip: Really Sorry (2003)
- éS: Europe Tour (2003)
- Thrasher: King of the Road 2003 (2003)
- Coliseum: Boston Massacre (2004)
- Red Bull: Seek & Destroy I (2004)
- Digital Skateboarding #12 Divercity (2005)
- Fourstar: Super Champion Funzone (2005)
- Fourstar: Catalog Shoot (2005)
- Elwood: First & Hope (2006)
- Plan B: Live After Death (2006)
- Sex, Hood, Skate, and Videotape (2006)
- éS: eSpecial (2007)
- DC: Live From Europe (2008)
- Plan B: Superfuture (2008)
- The Berrics: Battle Commander (2009)
- Plan B: Plan B In Moscow, Russia (2008)
- Plan B: Plan B In Arizona (2009)
