= Nixon (company) =

American apparel and accessories company

Nixon Inc.
- Founded: 1997; 29 years ago
- Founder: Andy Laats and Chad DiNenna
- Headquarters: Carlsbad, California, United States
- Products: Wristwatches, Accessories, Apparel
- Website: www.nixon.com

Nixon is an American watches and accessories brand, founded in 1997 in Encinitas, California, United States by Andy Laats and Chad DiNenna. In the past, Nixon had operated stand-alone retail stores in Berkeley, California, as well as Bondi and Melbourne, Australia, and Kuta, Bali. As of April 2025, Nixon no longer operates standalone stores, and instead works with retail partners and an online store to sell watches. The watch brand has a global presence with sales in over 90 countries worldwide.

== History ==
Nixon was founded in 1997 by Andy Laats and Chad DiNenna in Encinitas, California.

Both Laats and DiNenna worked in the action sports industry prior to founding Nixon. Laats, a former snowboard product manager at Burton with an engineering degree from Cornell University, was in the process of earning his Master of Business Administration (MBA) from Stanford University when he and DiNenna met to discuss the startup of Nixon. DiNenna, originally from Southern California, had studied communications at California State University, Long Beach and previously worked in publishing at TransWorld Media for five years prior to the launch of Nixon.

Laats and DiNenna raised nearly US$1 million from venture capitalists to start Nixon and, in 1997, the debut catalog was released; seven models were released through 200 retailers. Nixon opened a subsidiary in France in 2000, and by 2005 had 90 models, and 60 employees, with sales growing by 55 percent annually.

As of April 2025, Nixon no longer operates standalone retail stores. Nixon watches can be found in retail partners like Tilley's and Macy's, and purchased online through the Nixon website. In addition to their Carlsbad, California headquarters, Nixon maintains a global presence with offices in France and Australia.

== Purchase ==
In December 2006, Nixon was acquired by Billabong International for approximately US$55 million and a deferred payment of approximately US$76 million in FY 2012.

During the spring of 2012, after six years under the Billabong umbrella of brands, Nixon once again became an independent brand. Nixon established an agreement with Trilantic Capital Partners ("TCP") and Billabong, each of which now owns a 48.5% stake in the brand, with the balance 3% held by Nixon management, including Laats and DiNenna. The resulting transaction values Nixon at approximately US$464 million, representing a multiple of approximately 9.2x LTM EBITDA.

== Products ==
=== Watches ===
Nixon sells many models of wristwatches, digital and analog, for men and women, with movements from Japan and Switzerland. The brand has several watch models that are considered "collector's items" amongst the many fans of the brand. These models, including the Nixon Time Teller and the Nixon 51-30 Chrono, are regularly updated with new colors and materials.

Nixon offers customers the opportunity to personalize watch purchases, depending on where the watch is purchased from. Customers located in the United States and Canada are able to build custom watches. This process involves selecting the watch case, dial, chronograph hand and watch band. Customers within the United States are able to add a custom engraved message to the back of select watch styles, including popular models like the Time Teller and 51-30 Chrono.

Nixon often works with other brands to create collaborative watch collections. Collaboration partners have come from various industries, such as:

- Film & TV: Including Disney properties like Star Wars
- Music: Including popular bands and artists like Metallica, Grateful Dead, 2PAC and Nirvana
- Art: Including artists such as Hannah Eddy
- Action Sports: Including brands such as Santa Cruz, Independent and Spitfire

Though they previously made a smartwatch, Nixon no longer offers connected watches.

Today, the most popular watches from the Nixon catalog include the Nixon 51-30 Chrono, the Nixon Sentry, and the Nixon Time Teller. These models are often refreshed in seasonal capsules, including collaborations and new colors. Each of these Nixon watches are analog.

The Nixon Heat, an ultra-thin 10 ATM digital sports watch, is one of the brand's most popular and iconic digital watches.

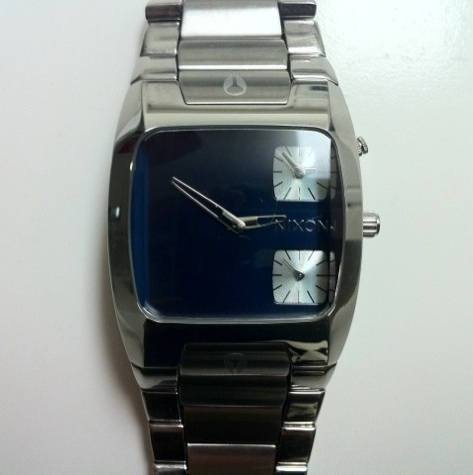
Nixon's "The Banks" watch. It features a dial that keeps the seconds, and a third dial to have the time in another time zone.

=== Clothing & Accessories ===
In addition to men's and women's watches, Nixon offers a line of clothing and accessories. Items include shirts, sweatshirts, bags, hats, wallets and belts.

=== Audio ===
In 2009, Nixon released its first audio products with a line of headphones and has since expanded to include portable speakers. At the time of this writing, Nixon no longer sold any audio products.

=== Locking Looper Patent ===
Nixon holds the patent for the watch band closure system known as the "Locking Looper". The mechanism uses a looped band construction that threads through itself and locks in place, providing a secure and adjustable fit without traditional pin-and-buckle hardware. The design was developed with active sports use in mind, addressing the limitations of conventional watch band closures for surfers, skateboarders, and snowboarders. The Locking Looper has been incorporated into multiple Nixon watch lines since its introduction and remains a feature of the brand's surf and tide watch category.

== Events ==
=== Nixon Surf Challenge ===
The Nixon Surf Challenge started out as a group of Nixon team riders and has since developed into an annual invite-only event.

Since 2000, Nixon has hosted the Surf Challenge near the Spanish/French border in San Sebastián, Spain and has featured a €10,000 prize purse. For its ten-year anniversary, the event was brought to Lofoten Islands, Norway. In 2012, the contest was brought to La Graciosa in the Canary Islands of Spain.

=== Nixon Jibfest ===
Jibbing is the snowboarding term for performing skateboarding-inspired tricks, like sliding on obstacles. Conversations to create the event first came to Nixon via Jeremy Jones, JP Walker, and Dave Downing in the late 90s ultimately resulting in the creation of the Nixon JibFest.

In 2011, after an eight-year hiatus, the Nixon JibFest returned. The revitalized contest featured a new custom course, new riders and a new jibbers playground. It was documented for a web series that launched on vice.com

=== Best Time Award ===
At various surf, skateboarding and snowboarding competitions where Nixon sponsorship is present, Nixon is known for giving out what is called the "Best Time Award". This award is given to the competitor who displays the most enthusiasm, personality and crowd engagement. Technical scores don't matter to be the winner of the Nixon Best Time Award.

Winners of this special Nixon award receive a custom-engraved and gold-toned Nixon watch as a wearable trophy. The Best Time Award has been given out at a variety of high profile events including the Rockstar Energy Open and Tampa Pro. Past winners include Greyson Fletcher, DIllon Henricksen and Wyatt Hammond.

The Best Time Award evolved from an earlier Nixon tradition called "Winner Take All", originally developed by the Nixon team, journalist Pat Bridges and SLUSH Snowboarding Magazine for the inaugural World Quarters snowboarding event at Mammoth Mountain.

== Notable customers ==
Throughout the years, many high profile people have been spotted wearing Nixon watches and hats. Actors such as Adam Scott, Ryan Reynolds, Milo Ventimiglia, Tom Hardy and Tom Holland have all been photographed wearing gear from the California brand, as has rapper Kendrick Lamar, singer Justin Bieber and musician Dave Grohl.

Nixon watches have also been prominently featured in Film & TV, including:

- Michiel Huisman in a Nixon Regulus for Echo 3
- Linda Hamilton in a Nixon Regulus for Terminator: Dark Fate
- Sam Rockwell in a Nixon Fader for The Way, Way Back
- Mason Gooding in a Nixon Never too Late for Heart Eyes
