= H-Street =

American skateboard company

H-Street Skateboards
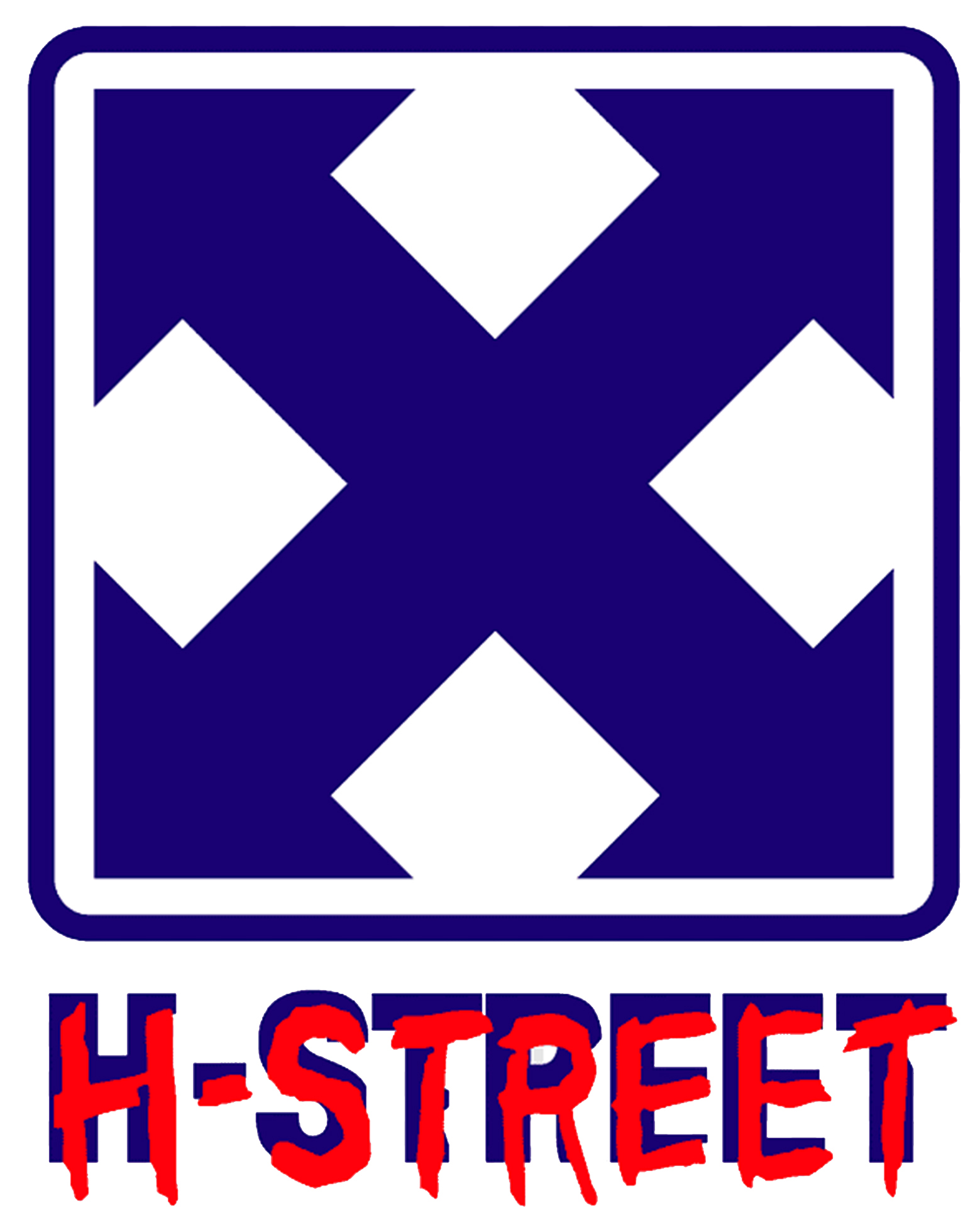
- Industry: Skateboarding
- Founded: 1986
- Founders: Tony Magnusson, Mike Ternasky
- Headquarters: San Diego California
- Website: www.h-street.com

H-Street Skateboards is a California-based skateboard company created by professional (semi-retired) skateboarder Tony Magnusson (T-Mag) and Mike Ternasky in 1986. H-Street garnered worldwide popularity through their innovative team and groundbreaking DIY skate videos.

== History ==
In late 1986, after transitioning from Uncle Wiggley Skateboards and Magnusson Designs, T-Mag and Ternasky met with industry leader George Abuhamad to pitch the idea for H-Street Skateboards. Abuhamad supported the proposal and funded the venture while overseeing manufacturing and production. Friend and professional skater Dave Andrecht conducted initial sales and provided office oversight. The company name H-Street was envisioned as an inclusive, relatable Anytown USA concept but specifically named after a Chula Vista, California street and early skate spot.

According to Magnusson and H-Street logo creator/artist Francesco "Jekill" Albertini; "The H-Street Mark logo ancient origin is based on the H-Street patron Saint Andrew the Apostle, who was martyred on a heraldic Crux Decussate, also known as a Saltire Cross and generally known as Saint Andrew's Cross. The Mark logo represents skateboarding as a universal and expanding cultural phenomena for those who ride everything; ramps, bowls, pools, slalom, downhill, freestyle and street skating; Skate Everything. Skateboarding Lives Forever. Skateboarders Bringing Peace and Friendship to the World through Skateboarding."

Magnusson introduced many early board design concepts including Hell Concave, a significant increase in overall tip-to-tail concave designed for total board control. Early H-Street logos, artwork and graphic design were created by legendary artists Francesco "Jekill" Albertini, Jeff Klindt, Art Godoy, Scott Obradovich, and Carl Hyndman. In 1990 T-Mag also explored the bourgeoning skate-influenced snowboard scene, producing a prototype halfpipe model for team rider Noah Salasnek and later a limited snowboard line.

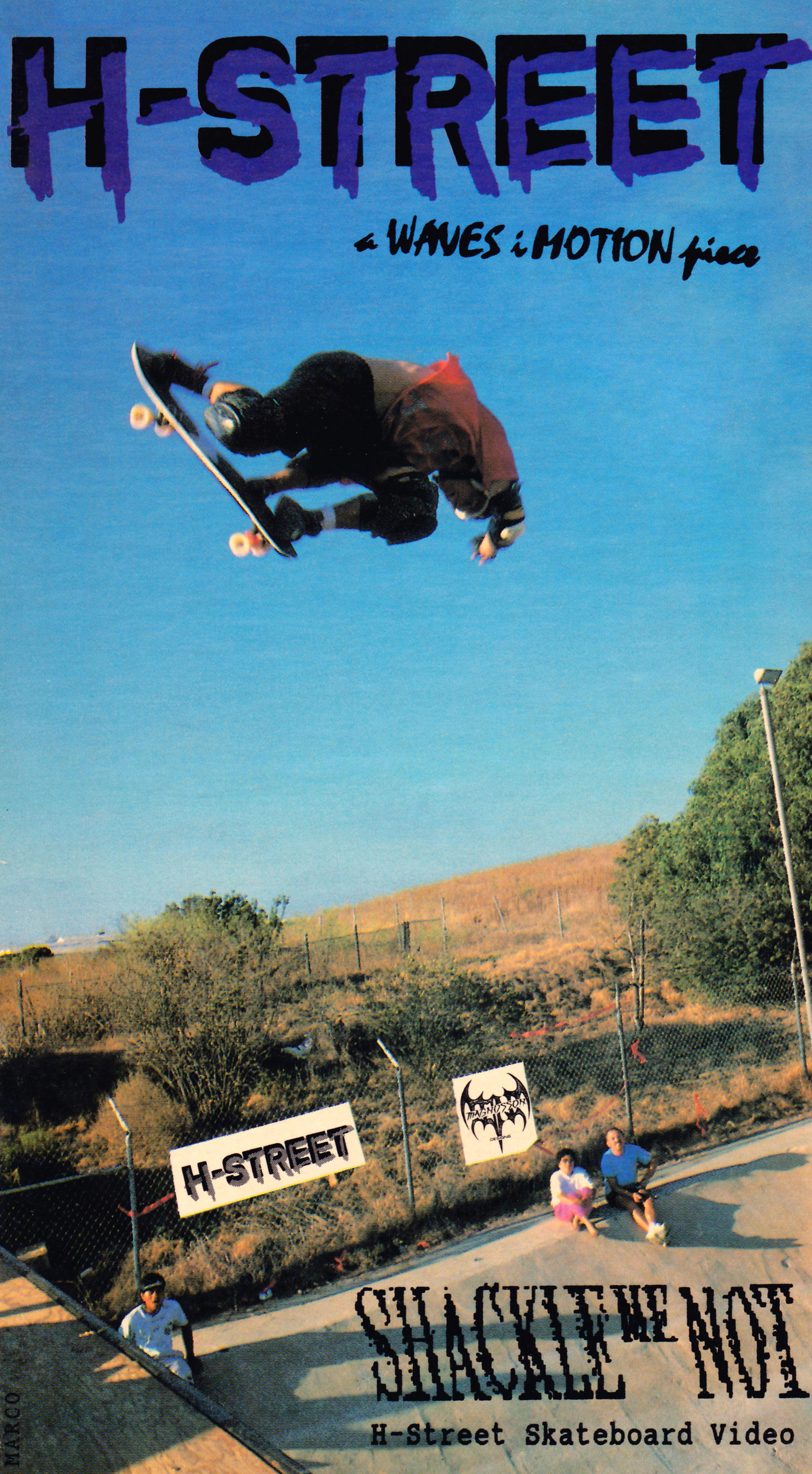
Shackle Me Not VHS 1988

From the inception of H-Street, both T-Mag and Ternasky shared a common vision to create a rider-owned company and to democratize the future of skate videos and trick progression by utilizing budget VHS cameras, freeform home VCR editing, local underground music with innovative up-and-coming skaters. The 1988 creation of Shackle Me Not marked a pivotal moment in the production of DIY skateboard videos as it presented relatable homegrown skaters in a raw, unfiltered environment while upending the formal big-budget film standard set by industry giants Powell Peralta and others. Later in 1989, the groundbreaking Hokus Pokus was released and further revolutionized the skateboard scene with a revered underground soundtrack while showcasing legends Matt Hensley, Ron Allen, Danny Way, Sal Barbier, Colby Carter, Alphonzo Rawls, Mike Carroll and many others. Both videos quickly rose to become two of the most viewed, sought-after and influential VHS skate films ever. Ternasky and T-Mag went on to edit and/or release six additional films under the H-Street umbrella, Not The New H-Street Video (1991), Summer Tour (1991), Life: A Soldier's Story (1991), Planet Earth: Now 'N' Later (1991), Next Generation (1992) and Lick (1993).

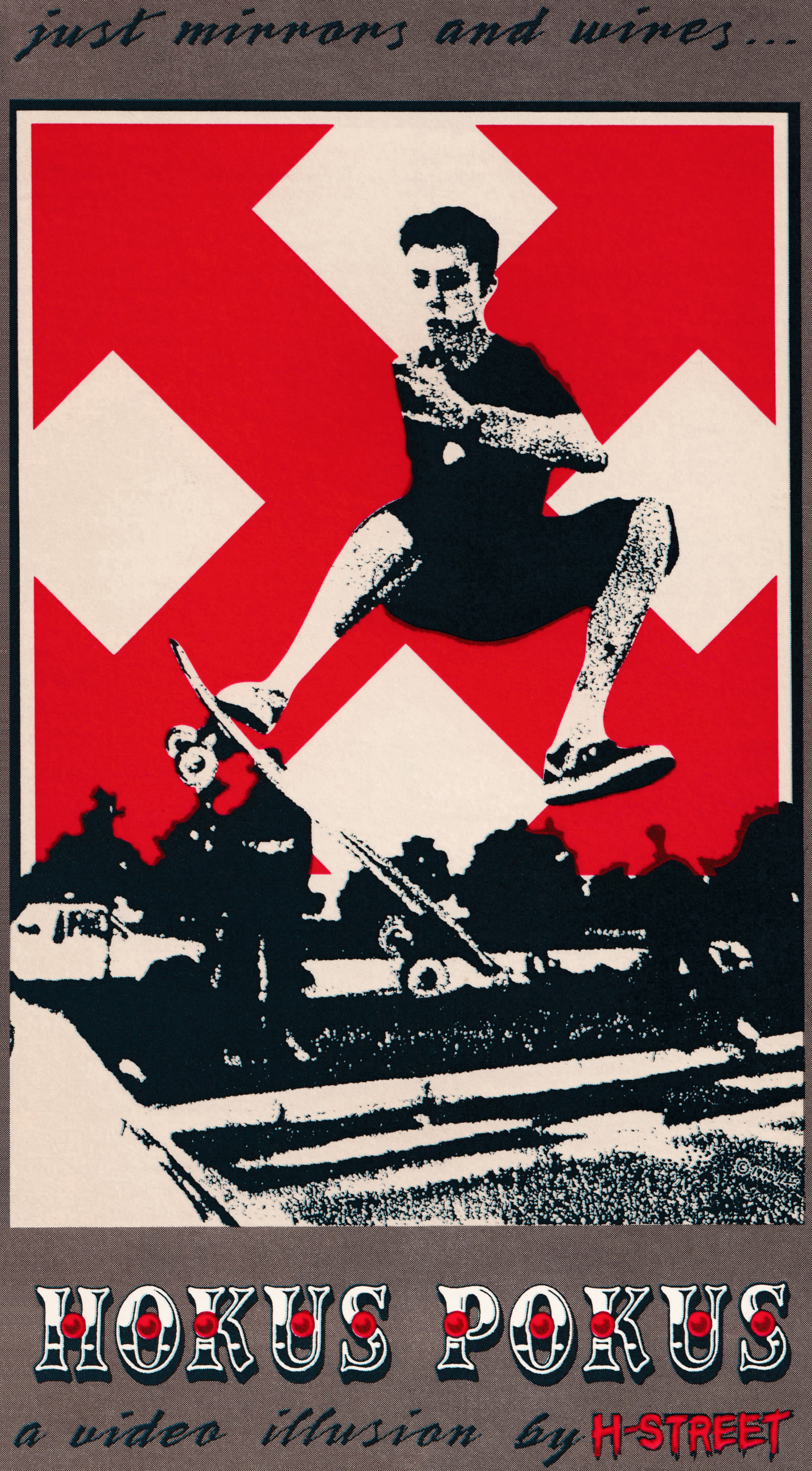
Hocus Pocus VHS 1989

In late 1990, T-Mag and Ternasky diverged team talent to create Ron Allen's subsidiary company Life Skateboards showcasing Sean Sheffey, Noah Salasnek, Jesse Neuhaus, John Reeves, Dave Donelson, Kien Lieu, Brennand Schoeffel and Kit Erickson. H-Street also assisted in the early 1991 creation and distribution of Planet Earth Skateboards with Chris Miller and his team; Brian Lotti, Buster Halterman, Trent Gaines, Felix Arguelles, Jason Ellis, Eric Jueden, Jovontae Turner, Mark Roach and others.

In late 1991, Ternasky abruptly left H-Street to create Plan B Skateboards with World Industries, recruiting numerous top H-Street riders in the process. This exodus left Magnusson with a decimated team and substantial financial burden. Despite rebuilding his roster with team members Eric Koston, Jason Rogers, Dan Peterka, Ocean Howell, Chad Vogt, Damian Carabajal, Charlie Thomas and others, the changing industry landscape combined with the untimely death of Ternasky in a car accident in early 1994 prompted T-Mag to formally shutter H-Street and pursue other ventures including Evol Skateboards and later Osiris Shoes.

After years of requests and consideration, Magnusson along with partner/wife Monica Magnusson and Abuhamad resurrected the H-Street brand in 2013. At the forefront of the relaunch was honoring the H-Street legacy, history and soul of the team riders, of which the company was based on. T-Mag in collaboration with the original team artists and skaters, continues to create new designs as well as graphic Original Re-Issues with unique colorways in original sizes and limited numbered sequence, all hand silk screened and handmade in the USA.

=== Riders ===
Past & Present: Matt Hensley, Ron Allen, John Schultes, Eddie Elguera, Art & Steve Godoy, Danny Way, John Sonner, Dave Nielson, Sal Barbier, Steve Ortega, Sean Sheffey, Eric Koston, Mike Carroll, Noah Salasnek, Jason Rogers, Colby Carter, Alphonzo Rawls, Ray Simmonds, John Deago, Kien Lieu, Ryan Monihan, Chris Livingston, Chad Vogt, Brian Lotti, Ben Job, Brennand Schoeffel, Darin Jenkins, John Reeves, Aaron Vincent, Jeremy Allyn, Jeff Pettit, Chris Borst, Kit Erikson, Dave Sornson, Jeff Klindt, Brian Tucci, Mike Kepper, Fred Olande, Josh Swindell, Mario Rubalcaba, Dave Donelson, Tim Gavin, Trent Gaines, Dan Peterka, Ocean Howell, Damian Carabajal, Danny Mayer, Chad Minton, Cara-Beth Burnside, Jeff Partain, Darrin Kimura, Carl Hyndman, Richard Ezekiel, Niko Achtipes, Dave Andrecht, Dave Crabb and Tony Magnusson.
