= Alphonzo Rawls =

American skateboarder

Alphonzo Rawls, also known as Alf, is a goofy-footed American professional skateboarder and footwear designer.

== Early life ==
Rawls grew up skating at the Del Mar Skate Ranch. As a child, Rawls makes appearance in the background of the film Animal Chin, attending Del Mar the day the film shot at the skatepark. Rawls skating progressed when McGill's skatepark opened up, featuring ramps of all sizes up to vert.

== Skateboarding career ==
After being courted but never signed by both Powell-Peralta and Dogtown, Rawl's first sponsor was H-Street. Rawls makes an additional cameo in the background of the H-Street video Shackle Me Not. While Tony Magnusson is doing a fakie rock on the mini-ramp at McGill’s, Rawls is doing a 540 over the spine in the background. Rawls coined the term "big-spin", a trick invented by Brian Lotti. Rawls has appeared in many skateboard videos.

Rawls is an accomplished vert and street skater, being the first skater to perform a backside tailslide and a kickflip-indy on vert. Rawls was on the cover of the November 1992 issue of Thrasher magazine doing a backside smith grind. After H-Street, Rawls rode for Bitch Skateboards, a company founded by Steve Rocco's brother, Sal.

== Footwear design ==
Alphonzo Rawls is a footwear designer, working for a number of skate and non-skate brands.
