= Film and television in Hawaii =

The U.S. state of Hawaii is referenced extensively in popular media, supported by efforts of the state government.

== Hawaii Film Office ==
The Hawaii Film Office is an agency of the U.S. state of Hawaii through the Department of Business, Economic Development and Tourism. The agency facilitates all in-state film and television productions and photography shoots, whether they are small, local, or independent projects or large commercial projects.

Each county also has its own film commission that works in concert with the state-run Hawaii Film Office. These county offices coordinate relations between media producers and the specific counties within which they film — Big Island Film Office, Honolulu Film Office, Kauai Film Commission and Maui Film Office. Each film commission is led by a film commissioner, appointed by respective county mayors, that acts as a liaison with the Governor of Hawaii and the Hawaii State Legislature in consideration of tax incentives and other benefits granted for filming in Hawaii.

Among the first film studios owned by the Hawaii Film Office was the Hawaii Film Studio, located on the island of Oahu

== Partial list of movies filmed in Hawaii ==
- Finding 'Ohana (2021)
- Strange Frame (2012)
- The Descendants (2011)
- Just Go with It (2011)
- Soul Surfer (2010)
- Princess Kaiʻulani (2009)
- A Perfect Getaway (2009)
- Forgetting Sarah Marshall (2008)
- 50 First Dates (2004)
- The Big Bounce (2004)
- Punch-Drunk Love (2003)
- Blue Crush (2002)
- Pearl Harbor (2001)
- Lani Loa (1998)
- Race the Sun (1996)
- Picture Bride (1995)
- Honeymoon in Vegas (1991)
- North Shore (1987)
- Tora! Tora! Tora! (1970)
- Hawaii (1966)
- Blue Hawaii (1961)
- South Pacific (1958)
- From Here to Eternity (1953)

=== Set, but not produced, in Hawaii ===
- Lilo & Stitch franchise (2002–06)
  - Lilo & Stitch (2002)
  - Stitch! The Movie (2003)
  - Lilo & Stitch 2: Stitch Has a Glitch (2005)
  - Leroy & Stitch (2006)

=== Produced, but not set, in Hawaii ===
- Strange Frame (2012)
- Pirates of the Caribbean: On Stranger Tides (2011)
- The Tempest (2010)
- Avatar (2009)
- Tropic Thunder (2008)
- The Rundown (2003)
- Windtalkers (2002)
- Final Fantasy: The Spirits Within (2001)
- Jurassic Park 3 (2001)
- To End All Wars (2001)
- Six Days Seven Nights (1998)
- Waterworld (1995)
- Jurassic Park (1993)
- Uncommon Valor (1983)
- Raiders of the Lost Ark (1980)
- King Kong (1976 remake)

== Television projects ==
- Magnum, P.I. (2018–present): CBS series
- Hawaii Five-0 (2010-2020): CBS series
- Living Lahaina (2007): MTV Series
- Maui Fever (2007): MTV series
- North Shore (2004-2005): Fox series
- Endurance: Hawaii (2004): Discovery Kids reality series
- Hawaii (2004): NBC series
- Dog the Bounty Hunter (2004–present): A&E series
- Celebrity Mole Hawaii (2003): ABC series
- Baywatch: Hawaii (1999-2001): NBC series
- The Real World: Hawaii (1999): MTV series
- Marker (1995): UPN series
- One West Waikiki (1994-1996): CBS series
- Byrds of Paradise (1994): ABC series
- Jake and the Fatman (1988-1990): CBS series
- Raven (1992) : CBS series
- War and Remembrance (1988): ABC mini-series
- The Thorn Birds (1982): ABC mini-series
- Magnum, P.I. (1980-1988): CBS series
- Fantasy Island (1988): ABC series
- Big Hawaii (1977): NBC series
- The Don Ho Show (1976-1977): ABC series
- Aloha from Hawaii (1973): NBC special featuring Elvis Presley
- Little People (1972-1974): CBS series
- Hawaii Five-O (1968-1980): CBS series
- Gilligan's Island (1964): CBS series
- Adventures in Paradise (1959-1962): ABC series
- Hawaiian Eye (1959-1963): ABC series

=== Produced, but not set in, Hawaii ===
- Lost (2004-2010) ABC series
- Off the Map (2011) ABC series
- Flight 29 Down (2005-2007) Discovery Kids series
- Tour of Duty (1987-1988): CBS series

=== Set, but not produced in, Hawaii ===
- South Park (2012): Comedy Central; Butters must explore his Hawaiian heritage with his friend Kenny.
- Lilo & Stitch: The Series (2003–06): ABC and Disney Channel; sequel series of the animated film of the same name. The show (and its franchise) is primarily set in a fictional town on Kauai. In the show, the titular human-alien duo must hunt down, capture, and rehabilitate the alien's "cousins".
- Sister, Sister (1995): The WB; the family visits Hawaii during Thanksgiving.
- Step by Step (1993): ABC; during second season the blended family wins a trip to Hawaii resulting in two episodes of Hawaiian adventure.
- Saved by the Bell (1992): NBC; the gang visits Hawaii in what was originally a made-for-TV movie, but was later split into four episodes in syndication.
- Full House (1989): ABC; the Tanner Family ventures to Hawaii for one episode to celebrate their time together, but everyone begins resenting Danny's insistence that they all do everything together and in accord with his detailed plans written on the "Clipboard of Fun" where he has allotted only small portions of time to each family member's activity of choice.
- Mama's Family: (1988) Syndicated; Thelma Harper, having been a contestant on Jeopardy! wins a Hawaiian vacation for the entire family; two following episodes chronicle the trip.
- Growing Pains (1987): ABC; the Sievers visit Hawaii during the first two episodes of season three.
- The Jeffersons (1980): CBS; To prevent a high risk from suffering a heart-attack, George is ordered by his doctor to take a vacation. George and Louise take a trip to Hawaii while Florence accompanies them. While at Hawaii, the Jeffersons learn that the Willises are staying in the same hotel with them for four episodes.
- Charlie's Angels (1977, 1980): ABC; in a 1977 episode, Charlie is kidnapped in Hawaii: the Angels go to the rescue. Later in 1980, the Angels move headquarters in Hawaii for five episodes.
- Sesame Street (1977–78): PBS; Four of the Sesame Street cast, along with Big Bird, Oscar, and even Snuffleupagus travel to Hawaii for a week of episodes during which they learn all about the nuances of Hawaiian culture, and Big Bird and Snuffleupagus search for a famous mountain shaped like a Snuffleupagus. Episode numbers: #1090 through #1095; originally aired January 13–20, 1978.
- Sanford and Son (1976): NBC; Fred and his son are vacationing in Hawaii and partaking in a convention for junk dealers. Little do they realize a pair of jewelry thieves are using them to smuggle diamonds to the mainland United States.
- The Brady Bunch (1973): ABC; The Bradys travel to Hawaii for three episodes when Mike is assigned to a building project in Honolulu. The boys end up finding an old Hawaiian Idol that superstitious locals report is "taboo" and they beginning worrying that they are being cursed with bad luck and should take the idol back to its original resting place.
- I Dream of Jeannie (1967-1968): NBC; Major Anthony Nelson and his voluptuous genie (Jeannie) are in Honolulu for business when they come across a con artist played by Milton Berle who comically tries to swindle them. In a later unrelated two-part episode the pair is back on the Waikiki scene along with pal Major Roger Healey. All three episodes feature the Ilikai Hotel & Luxury Suites.
