= 35th North =

Skate shop in Seattle, Washington, U.S.

Coordinates: 47°36′51.3″N 122°19′4.7″W

- Logo
- Founded: 2001; 25 years ago in Seattle, Washington, U.S.
- Owner: Tony Croghan
- Website: 35thnorth.com

35th North Skateshop, or simply 35th North, is a skate shop in Seattle, in the U.S. state of Washington.

== History ==
Owner Tony Croghan opened 35th North in Seattle's University District in 2001. The business has operated from Pike and 11th since 2003.

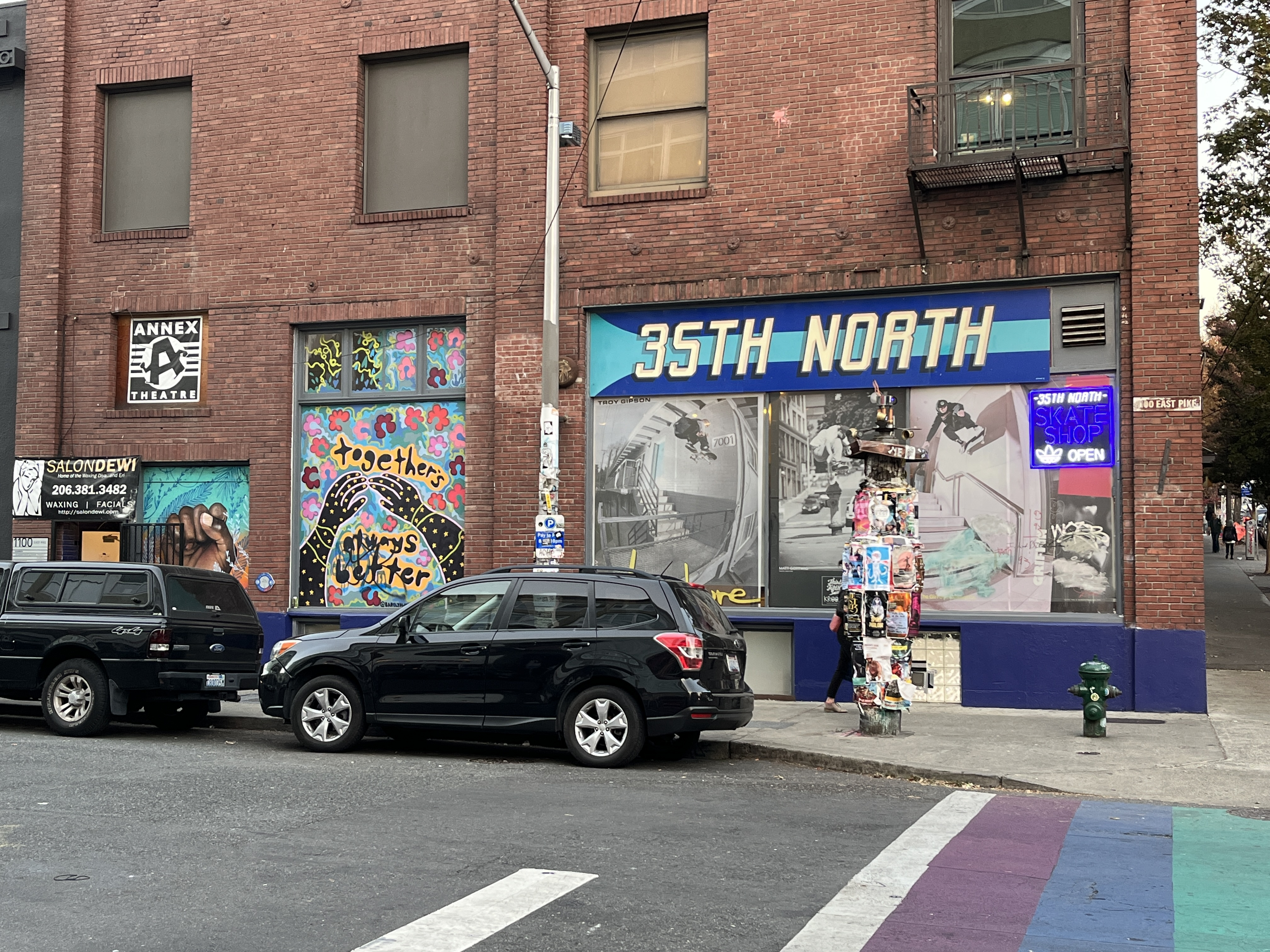
The shop's exterior, 2022

Croghan participated in a contest to build DIY skate spots. In 2017, the city of Seattle sued 35th North for creating a bowl on Duck Island in Green Lake Park, which the city considers a wildlife habitat. A $30,000 settlement was reached in 2018.

== Reception ==
The Not for Tourists Guide to Seattle says the shop has a "comprehensive selection of goods for co-ed skaters". In 2018, Tobias Coughlin-Bogue of Curbed Seattle called 35th North Seattle's "main skate shop". Thrasher has described the business as "central Seattle's longest standing core shop". Esther Hershkovits included the business in Red Bull's 2022 list of the city's three best skate shops.
