= Cheyne Magnusson =

American professional surfer and TV personality

Cheyne Anders Magnusson
- Born: July 14, 1983 (age 42); Southern California, United States
- Occupations: Professional surfer, businessman and reality television celebrity
- Website: Cheyne's profile on MTV.com

Cheyne Anders Magnusson (born July 14, 1983) is a professional surfer and one of the stars of MTV's reality show Maui Fever. He has worked as wave DJ at surf parks and is involved in a new venture in Palm Springs.

== Early life ==
Magnusson was born in Southern California and moved to Maui with his family at the age of seven. His father, Tony Magnusson, was a professional skateboarder and co-founded the Osiris Shoes company. According to Cheyne's mother Jill, "Cheyne could ride a skateboard before he could walk."

== Career ==
=== Professional surfing ===
At the age of sixteen, Magnusson was the 2000 Men's Hawaiian State Champion in surfing. In June of that year, he then represented the state of Hawaii in United States at the world championships—the highest honor an amateur surfer can receive. By the age of twenty-two, Cheyne was surfing professionally and was sponsored by Body Glove, Osiris Shoes, Dragon, and Chemistry Surfboards.

== Business ==
He is a primary backer of under construction the Palm Springs Surf Club.
