= Sean Sheffey =

American skateboarder

William Sean Sheffey is a regular-footed American professional skateboarder.

== Early life ==
Sheffey grew up in Maryland. Growing up, Sheffey was inspired by the skating of Mark Gonzales, Jesse Martinez, and Natas Kaupas.

== Skateboarding career ==
Sheffey became sponsored by a local skate shop after only 8 months of skating. In the late 1980s, Sheffey attended a skateboarding contest in Ocean City, Maryland. At this contest, he met the skaters that made up SHUT skateboards. With-in months of meeting the team, Sheffey was sponsored by Shut Skates. After riding for SHUT, Sheffey skated briefly for Santa Monica Airlines. After SMA, Sheffey rode for Ron Allen's new company Life Skateboards. In his part in the 1991 Life Skateboards skate video A Soldier's Story, Sheffey notably fakie ollies over a school lunch table.

After Life Skateboards, Sheffey joined the new company, Plan B, skating alongside a talented team of Danny Way, Rick Howard, Sal Barbier, Matt Hensley, and Rodney Mullen. Sheffey appeared in the critically acclaimed 1992 Questionable – produced by Plan B Skateboards. After Plan B, Sheffey skated for Girl Distribution Company. After Girl, Sheffey skated for Blind Skateboards.

In July 1994, Sheffey graced the cover of Transworld Skateboarding performing a kickflip at Fort Miley Military Reservation. In the cover photograph, Sheffey's hand drawn griptape art is visible.

When the Plan B company was revived in the 2010s, Sheffey rejoined the team.

| Skate video Parts & Appearances | Year |
|---|---|
| Reason for Living – Santa Cruz skateboards | 1990 |
| A Soldier's Story - Life Skateboards | 1991 |
| Questionable – Plan B | 1992 |
| Mouse – Girl Skateboards | 1996 |
