= Amy Ellington =

American entrepreneur and skate shop owner

- Born: Amy Gunther
- Occupations: Businesswoman; entrepreneur
- Known for: Founder of KCDC Skateshop
- Spouse: Erik Ellington

Amy Gunther Ellington (née Gunther) is an American entrepreneur and skate shop owner, founding KCDC Skateshop in 2001.

== Career ==
Amy Ellington opened KCDC Skateshop in November 2001 in Williamsburg. While running KCDC, Ellington focused on creating a physical place for community. Ellington operated KCDC as a forum to support the range of creative endeavors of skateboarders from art shows to music shows to video releases.

In celebration of the 20th anniversary of the shop, KCDC released a Nike Dunk colorway, a black and pink, KCDC x Nike SB Dunk High. As part of the release for the Nike Dunk, Ellington threw a party in Coney Island.

Ellington is featured in the Skate Dreams documentary, a feature length film about the rise of women’s skateboarding.

Ellington grew up in Long Island, New York.
