= KCDC =

KCDC may refer to:

- KCDC (FM)
- KCDC (skateshop)
- Cedar City Regional Airport
- Korea Centers for Disease Control and Prevention
- Kowloon City District Council, the district council for the Kowloon City District in Hong Kong
