= Maui Fever =

- Starring: Chaunte LeBlanc; Cheyne Magnusson; Anna Stimson; David Corbin; Anthony Vicar; Sean McClenahan; Jesse Beyer
- Country of origin: United States
- Original language: English
- No. of seasons: 1
- No. of episodes: 8

Production
- Executive producers: Jonathan Koch; Liz Gateley; Mike Powers; Morgan J. Freeman; Russell Heldt; Steve Michaels; Tony DiSanto
- Production location: Kaanapali, Hawaii
- Running time: 20 minutes
- Production company: Asylum Entertainment

Original release
- Network: MTV
- Release: January 17 – March 10, 2007

Maui Fever is an American reality television series that premiered on MTV on January 17, 2007. The series reveals the daily lives of several young friends living in the Kaanapali area on the island of Maui.

Following the style of MTV's Laguna Beach: The Real Orange County, The Hills, and 8th & Ocean, Maui Fever was shot as a "reality drama" (in the format of a scripted television show). Maui Fever cast members never spoke directly to the camera or gave testimonials, a tactic used in MTV's The Real World and in traditional documentaries. However, a voice-over narrative spoken by Cheyne Magnusson, one of the main characters, was used at the beginning of each episode to set up the scene and tie together storylines.

The opening credits of Maui Fever featured the song, "Horndog" by Overseer.

== Background ==
Producers casting for Maui Fever sought people who were willing to participate in the show and who were already part of a group of friends on the island. In June 2006, the producers of Maui Fever shot the pilot episode on location on the Valley Isle (Maui). After viewing the pilot and meeting with Hawaii's film commissioners, MTV executives gave Maui Fever "green light" status in August.

Filming of Maui Fever began on September 1, 2006, and continued for ten weeks. Initially the show was tentatively going to be called Island Fever. It is one of two MTV reality programs filmed on Maui in 2006; the other, Living Lahaina, began filming one week before Maui Fever but did not premiere until more than a month after the Maui Fever finale.

Maui Fever was executive produced by Steve Michaels, Jonathan Koch, Morgan J. Freeman, Liz Gateley and Tony DiSanto. They intended the show to be an homage to the sand-drenched beach films of the 1960s. From the initial concept, the show's creator (Freeman) and the other producers wanted to incorporate the feel and culture of Hawaii as though it were a "character," rather than merely a backdrop. Freeman described Maui as an ideal setting for a reality show because of its exotic scenery and spicy mix of tourists and locals. DiSanto likened the series to "a reality version of Cocktail." Producers sought to capture the allure of living on a tropical island in a state of "permanent vacation."

When filming of Maui Fever began, everyone involved was excited about the potentially vast and beneficial exposure for Hawaii. According to Hawaii's State Film Commissioner at that time, Donne Dawson, Maui Fever's producers were receptive to community and cultural concerns, and wanted the show to be as authentic as possible. Maui Film Commissions Benita Brazier also expressed strong optimism regarding Maui Fever, saying she was certain it would "put Maui in a good light," even though she knew there would be "some conflict of interest" (due to the usual content of reality television programming). Brazier indicated that she expected the producers to educate themselves about the island and "document the Maui that most visitors will never experience."

== Reception ==
Some critics expressed skepticism as to whether the "reality" in MTV's Maui Fever was real. In the tradition of Laguna Beach and The Hills, Maui Fever has been called "MTV's latest faux-reality semi-scripted hit TV show." Many find that the aggressive editing tactics, used to mimic the style of a traditional television drama (rather than a reality show), make the scenes feel fabricated. In spite of this criticism, MTV's "reality dramas" have been popular, including Maui Fever. The show's ratings were successful, attracting millions of viewers each week.

In Hawaii, Maui Fever garnered a negative response. Even before the series premiered, rumors circulated that the youth and culture of Maui were misrepresented. Objections stemmed from the show's failure to represent the ethnic makeup of Maui. According to the 2000 census, Maui County is 31 percent Asian, 10 percent Native Hawaiian or Pacific Islander, and 22 percent mixed race. Caucasians account for 33 percent of the county population. However, all seven of the Maui Fever core cast members were caucasian. Due to the lack of racial diversity and the fact that very few of the cast members were long-time residents of Maui, at the time of the show's airing there were online petitions against it on websites such as MySpace. Locals were also disturbed by the show's sexual content, lack of cultural diversity and resulting misconceptions about Maui. According to State Film Commissioner Dawson, public reaction to Maui Fever was stronger than the response to any other Hawaii production.

== Cast ==
The core cast of Maui Fever included seven main characters: Chaunte, Cheyne, Anna, Corbin, Anthony, Sean and Jesse. Additionally, the show featured several supporting characters, including: Kevin, Justin, Rachael, Jesse James, Katie, Bryce and Carrie. Everyone in the cast already lived on Maui prior to filming. When the show was initially announced, MTV indicated that the majority of the characters were born and raised on the island. However, it was later revealed that none of the core cast members were Maui-born.

=== Starring characters ===
Cast Member Information
Chaunte LeBlanc (born c.1986 in the continental United States) moved to Maui at the age of four. She graduated from King Kekaulike High School in Pukalani (on the island of Maui). As of the time of filming Maui Fever, Chaunte worked as a restaurant hostess at Leilani's in Kaanapali. According to MTV, she had a "rough childhood," which contributed to her fear of commitment and distaste for being "tied down." Anthony was her on-again/off-again boyfriend throughout Maui Fever. On the show Chaunte often told Anthony she wanted to be "just friends," but also found herself upset by the idea of him dating anyone else.
Cheyne Magnusson (born c.1983 in Southern California) moved to Hawaii with his family at the age of seven. He graduated from Lahainaluna High School in Lahaina (on the island of Maui). His father is professional skateboarder Tony Magnusson. Cheyne is a professional surfer, with sponsorships from Body Glove, Osiris shoes, Dragon and Borst Surfboards. Cheyne, also an excellent skateboarder, appeared in the film Lords of Dogtown and did his own skating. On Maui Fever Cheyne was at the center of a love triangle between his girlfriend Rachael and his ex-girlfriend Anna. He also was the show's narrator.
Anna Stimson (born c.1986 in the United States) moved to Maui from Oregon in 2003. On Maui Fever, she was Chaunte's roommate and a fellow restaurant hostess. It was revealed on Maui Fever that Anna's father and Chaunte's father both died prior to the time of the show, which was another common bond between the girls. Anna and Chaunte were "partners-in-crime," usually appearing together in scenes. Throughout the series, Anna struggled with her lingering feelings for ex-boyfriend Cheyne. Anna remained close to Cheyne even after he started dating Rachael, resulting in much drama. Regarding the experience of filming Maui Fever, Anna has admitted that she often forgot the cameras were rolling. According to Anna, some days after shooting she reviewed the events in her mind and thought to herself "What did I just do?"
David Corbin (born c.1982 in California), goes by his last name on Maui Fever. He has lived in Hawaii since the age of six and grew up on the Big Island. Corbin, a musician, expressed hope that Maui Fever would boost his rising career. Corbin's main passion is to work with people in a professional capacity, such as in the field of real estate. Corbin was referred to as the clown of the Maui Fever group. He was often shown surfing the beaches of Hawaii.
Anthony Vicar (born c.1987 on the Big Island, Hawaii) was raised on the island of Hawaiʻi. He later moved to Maui and became good friends with Cheyne. Like Cheyne, Anthony graduated from Lahainaluna High School on the island of Maui. During the filming of Maui Fever Anthony lived in a loft space in Cheyne's apartment. Anthony, an artist, was portrayed as the somewhat reserved member of the cast. He and Chaunte began dating before the start of filming. One of the featured storylines on Maui Fever followed Anthony's discomfort with Chaunte's party-girl behavior and demands for "space" from him. With respect to his appearance on the show, Anthony has said "I'm comfortable with who I am. I don't care. They can make me out for who they want."
Sean McClenahan (born c.1982 in the continental United States) moved to Maui in 2000. As of February, 2007, Sean was working at the Hula Grill Kaanapali restaurant. When the cast of Maui Fever came under criticism for the carefree partying featured on the show, the restaurant's general manager defended Sean's character, saying that he was "a great server, . . . charming and very nice," even though the show did not depict him as a hard worker. Most often, Sean was shown surfing and flirting with tourist chicks. After one of Chaunte's breaks from Anthony during Maui Fever, Sean made a move on her with an invitation to go out for a good "steak and lob." While filming Sean grew tired of the crowds that would gather to watch and said he could see how being famous "could get annoying."
Jesse Beyer (born c.1985 in the midwest United States) moved to Maui from Chicago in 2004. Prior to shooting Maui Fever, Jesse moved in with his good friend Corbin and become part of the Kaanapali crew. Still, he often felt like the proverbial fish out of water. He was often featured on the show picking up girls with Corbin, but eventually found himself breaking the Maui Fever crew's number one rule: don't fall for a tourist.

=== Supporting characters ===
Cast member information
Kevin Sullivan was friends with Corbin, Jesse James and the rest of the cast. He played a supporting role on the cast, encouraging others to hook up with tourists. Memorably, on episode two of Maui Fever, Kevin threw a party at his large, beautiful house.
Justin Dutro, Cheyne's friend, helped Cheyne put together an impromptu party for Anthony after one of his splits from Chaunte.
Rachael appeared on Maui Fever as Cheyne's girlfriend. On the show, she did not like Cheyne and his ex-girlfriend Anna to spend time together. Rachael is employed as a wedding planner. She has a pet cat.
Jesse James, a friend of Kevin, often was seen surfing on Maui Fever. In episode four, Jesse James walks in on Kevin when he is trying to hook up with a tourist, ruining Kevin's game.
Katie Vreedenburgh, a friend of Anna and Chaunte, was seen on several episodes of Maui Fever. She came clubbing with the girls in episode five and helped them get ready for their Mardi Gras party on episode seven.
Bryce (born c.1989) was a friend of Anthony. On Maui Fever, Chaunte took an interest in Bryce and hooked up with him, even though he was only seventeen years old at the time (and a friend of her sometimes boyfriend). This put a strain on relations between Bryce and Anthony.
Carrie is referred to as "Jesse's girl" on Maui Fever. She moves to Maui from Seattle in episode three.

== Episodes ==
No.	Title	Original release date
1	"The Game"	January 17, 2007
Cheyne admits to Anna that he is not over her. The two plan to get some girls for Anthony to help him get over Chaunte. When Cheyne tells Rachael about this plan she is angry that Anna might be there. Anna tells Chaunte about the plan for hooking-up Anthony and Chaunte gets mad. That night, Cheyne invites girls back to the condo he shares with Anthony and Chaunte arrives to defend her territory. The next day, Anthony tells Chaunte he was glad she showed up. They kiss and make up.Sean asks Chaunte to go out on a date. Anthony shows up and Chaunte leaves with him. She tells Anthony she wants to be friends and he argues that will not work. Corbin hooks up with Katie, a tourist. Jessie (and another girl) join Corbin and Katie for a double day-date. When Katie asks to stay with Corbin he tells her it's okay, as long as she doesn't stay forever. Corbin wakes up on his couch the next morning and Katie is gone.
2	"I Got Your Back"	January 24, 2007
Chaunte tells Anna that even though she hooks up with Anthony, they're not a couple. Chaunte agrees to go to a party up-country with Sean. The next day, Sean tells Kevin that things got out of hand up-country with Chaunte, who spent most of the night on the phone with Anthony. Chaunte tells Anna that Sean "crossed the line" by pushing her to hook up. At Kevin's party that night Chaunte repeatedly has to push away Sean. Eventually, she calls over Anthony, who demands that Sean apologize to Chaunte. Sean does not want to cause trouble with his buddy, so he complies. Chaunte and Anthony go swimming together the next day. During Kevin's party, Rachael is upset with Cheyne because he stood her up earlier that day. The tiff ends when Cheyne tells Rachael that she is hot. Jesse receives a call from Carrie, who tells him she is moving to Maui. Jesse and Corbin decide to party nonstop until she arrives. They bring some girls out on a boat and then to Kevin's party, where Jesse flirts with Tamara, a tourist. He interrupts their conversation to take a call from Carrie, telling her he misses her and can't wait for her to move to Maui. Jesse lies to Tamara about who was on the phone.
3	"Arrivals and Departures"	January 31, 2007
Chaunte tells Anna that she is together with Anthony, but he is not her boyfriend. While skateboarding, Cheyne urges Anthony to keep his guard up with Chaunte. Cheyne catches a fish dinner for himself and Rachael. They discuss Rachael's upcoming birthday party. Cheyne runs into Anna while shopping for Rachael's gift. Anna makes suggestions, including a tiara. Cheyne urges Anna to come to the party. Anthony and Cheyne are chilling with some girls. Chaunte rolls up, angry that Anthony stood her up for lunch. Anthony leaves with Chaunte. At Rachael's party Anna feels awkward around the birthday girl, who is wearing a tiara from Cheyne. Chaunte sees Anthony talking to a certain girl who often calls him. Chaunte pulls him aside and demands that he not speak to the girl, even though he only considers her a friend. The next day Anthony tells Chaunte that he needs a break because they fight too much. She agrees to it, but warns Anthony that she might not be there when he's ready for the break to end. Jesse searches for photos of himself with naked girls, which he wants to get rid of before Carrie arrives. In the morning, Jesse picks Carrie up from the airport and the two are very happy to see each other.
4	"Strike Out"	February 7, 2007
Chaunte, Anna and Katie go up-country to party with Nick, Chaunte's ex, and meet new boys. Nick tries to win back Chaunte with a gift of a shirt. Meanwhile, Anthony confesses to Cheyne that when he said he wanted a "break," he was only looking to spend a day or so away from Chaunte. Zack (Chaunte's ex) encourages Anthony to move on from Chaunte. Chanute lies to Anthony about her plans, saying she is going to bed early, but he suspects she is up to something. That evening at the club Chaunte fends off Nick's advances. He eventually gets kicked out for arguing over drinks, but the girls keep the party going. The next day Anna and Chaunte discuss their issues with guys and fathers. Later, Chaunte makes a surprise stop to see Anthony. Kevin and Sean hang out with two tourist girls at Sean's house. Sean hooks up with one of them. After Jesse James shows up, Kevin strikes out with the other and later takes much abuse about it from Jesse James and Corbin.
5	"Have This, Want That"	February 14, 2007
Rachael's cat pees on Cheyne's bed, provoking an argument. At Justin's barbecue, Cheyne unloads about his girl problems and ends up getting advice from the whole family. Later, at a beach party, things between Cheyne and Anna heat up and they decide to go back to her place for an "after-party." Rachael makes a surprise appearance and Cheyne tells her that he wants to be single. She storms off. Cheyne returns to the beach and makes out with Anna. They go to Anna's place, but Rachael makes another surprise appearance outside. Cheyne goes out to talk to her in her car. After a few minutes, Cheyne has enough and goes back in the house, where the love-fest continues with Anna, while Rachael goes home to cry. While skating, Sean meets a tourist named Lily. They decide to go on a double date with her friend Erica and one of Sean's friends. Corbin agrees to come along and is pleasantly surprised that Erica is a babe. Halfway through the meal Sean and Corbin realize that they're attracted to each other's dates, so when the girls go to the bathroom, they plan a trade. Surprisingly the girls agree to it.
6	"Fresh Lei"	February 21, 2007
Anna wakes up to an empty bed after her night with Cheyne. Chaunte grills her for details. Back at his apartment, Cheyne confesses he made a mistake by dumping Rachael and is bummed out by the situation. He and Anthony decide to spend the day surfing. As Cheyne heads for the beach, Anna calls to see if he wants to hang. When he blows her off Anna assumes that he's already back on Rachael's leash. Anna and Chaunte decide to have a Mardi Gras-themed house party without Anthony and Cheyne. While working on a cake, Chaunte tells Anna and Katie she likes Bryce, Anthony's good friend. They tease Chaunte for liking a younger guy. At the party, Anthony shows up just in time to bust Chaunte and Bryce hooking up. Anthony tries to hunt down Bryce, but he makes a getaway in Chaunte's car. While getting her hair braided the next day, Chaunte tells Anna that she doesn't want to fight with Anthony anymore. After receiving an apology from Cheyne on her voicemail, Rachael invites him over to talk. He apologizes again and confesses to hooking up with Anna the night before. At Rachael's request, Cheyne calls Anna and leaves a message saying he will not see her anymore. Rachael leaves for Oahu to clear her mind and think about whether she will take back Cheyne.
7	"Apology Unaccepted"	March 10, 2007
When Rachael gets back from Oahu, she tells Cheyne that she still wants to be with him, but she can't trust him for a while; Cheyne agrees not to have contact with Anna. The two decide to move in together. Anna and Chaunte are shocked to hear that Rachael is moving in with Cheyne. At a beach party that day, Anna notices that she and Rachael are wearing the same sunglasses; Anna immediately tosses her designer shades in the sand, saying she's over them. Anna catches Rachael on her way out of the party and apologizes for hooking up with Cheyne, but Rachael gives her the cold shoulder and goes off to work. Cheyne shows up while Anna is giving Chaunte and Jesse the dish on Rachael's attitude. Anna confronts him too. Cheyne tells her that he's serious about cutting off contact with her, saying that his relationship with Rachael is more important than his friendship with Anna. Anthony tells Chaunte the situation with Bryce hurt him, but Chaunte refuses to apologize. Anthony storms off, after telling her that they're not on speaking terms anymore. When Anthony meets up with Cheyne, Cheyne confesses that he is not so psyched about moving in with Rachael. At the beach, Cheyne observes Chaunte and Bryce talking, so he approaches them and tells them that Anthony is on his way over. They shrug it off. When Anthony arrives and sees Chaunte with Bryce, he instantly splits. Cheyne pulls Bryce aside and tells him to back off from Chaunte and almost causes a fight. Later, Anthony goes over to Chaunte's place to get his stuff back, as he prepares to leave for art school in Oahu. They hug and make-up.
8	"Forgive and Regret"	March 10, 2007
The gang takes a vacation to Hana. Anna tries to apologize to Rachael again, but she still refuses to even look at her. Anna storms off, angry about Rachael. Cheyne takes offense and argues with Anna; she freaks out, making a scene in front of the entire crew. Rachael comes outside and tells Anna and Cheyne that she still isn't going to forgive them. Anna cries. In the morning Chaunte has trouble waking Anna. She leaves her sleeping and goes to the beach with Anthony. When she returns, Anna tells her she was disappointed that Chaunte ditched her because she needed a friend after the previous night's drama. Chaunte asks if she forgives her, and Anna says yes. The next morning, Chaunte wakes Anthony to take him to the airport. They stop on the way to watch the sunrise and talk about how much they will miss each other. Chaunte apologizes for hurting him, telling him that she loves him. Then Chaunte drops Anthony off at the airport where he is bound for Oahu. After surfing, Cheyne sees Anna leaving work. The two talk, but nothing is resolved. Anna is once again left in tears, knowing things might never be the same.
