= Rip City Skates =

Skate shop in Santa Monica, California, US

Coordinates: 34°2′4″N 118°28′24″W

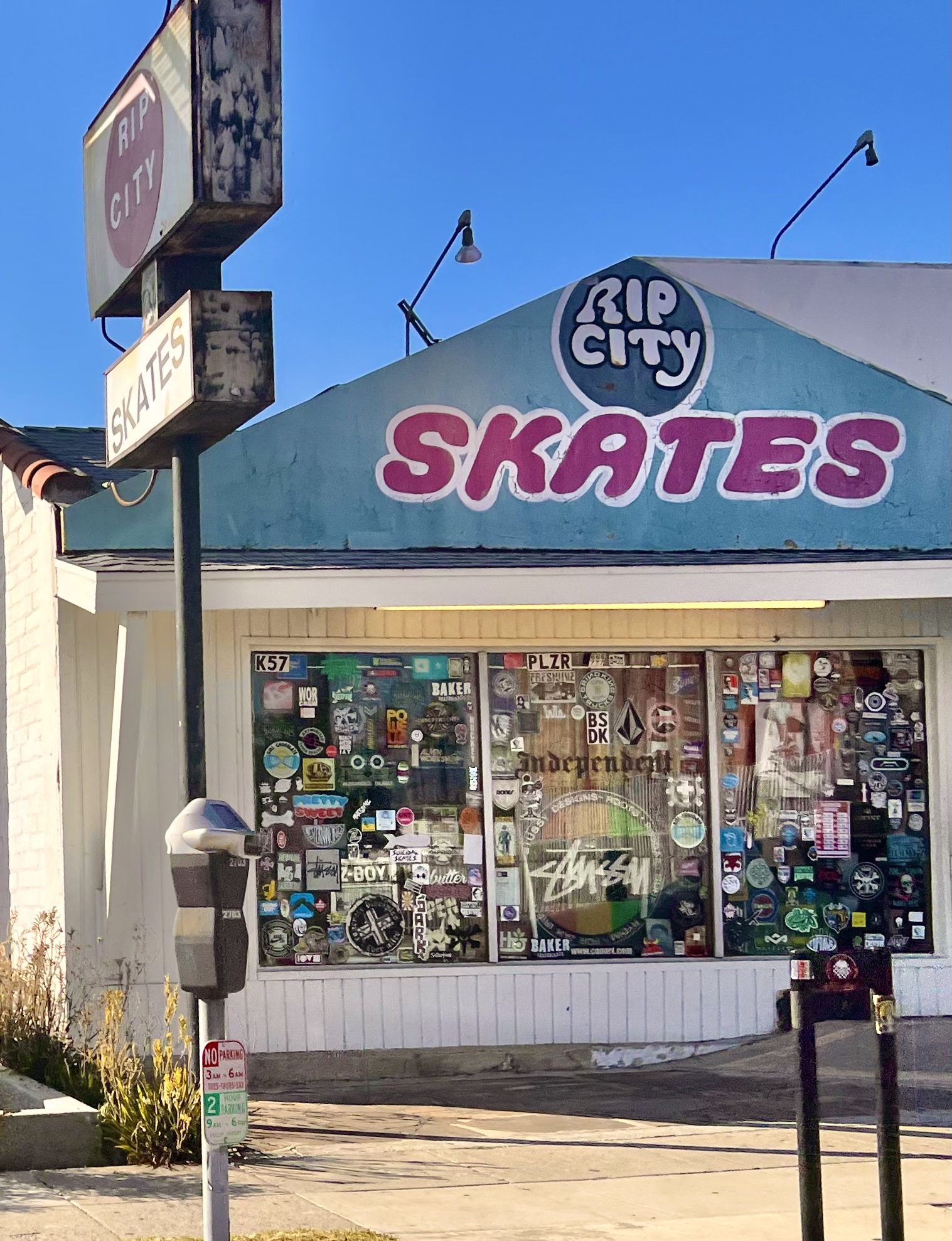
Exterior view of Rip City Skates, August 2022

Rip City Skates, known also as Rip City, is the longest running skate shop in Santa Monica, California, established in 1978.

== History ==
The shop was founded by Jim McDowell and his cousin Bill Poncher. The shop opened as a skateboard and a roller skate shop. The popularity of rollerskating waned and the shop became a meeting place for the Santa Monica and greater west L.A. skateboard scene. In 1984, Sean Stussy, then an unknown fashion designer, convinced Jim and Bill to carry his clothing in the shop. Before business picked up in the mid-1980s, the shop offered pinball machines as an extra revenue source. Rip City is known for its interior decoration, with the walls of the shop lined with skateboards.

In 2020, a local brewery called Santa Monica Brew Works launched "RIP CITY SKATES IPA", a West Coast-Style India Pale Ale, to celebrate the skate shop's legacy.

In 2023, the shop was inducted into the Skateboarding Hall of Fame.

=== Save Rip City Skates campaign ===
In November 2019, it was announced that the building at 2709 Santa Monica Blvd where Rip City Skates has been in business for over 40 years was scheduled for demolition and redevelopment. The local skateboard community has begun a community organizing campaign to save the building, asking the city of Los Angeles to deem Rip City Skates a historical landmark. The building, built in the 1930s, used to be a surfer bar called Robins Reef.
