= Tony Magnusson =

Skateboarder (born 1963)

- Born: February 23, 1963 (age 63); Stockholm, Sweden
- Other name: T-Mag
- Occupation: Skateboarder
- Height: 5 ft 2 in (1.57 m)
- Spouse: Monica Magnusson
- Children: Cheyne Magnusson
- Website: H-Street.com

Tony Magnusson (T-Mag) (born February 23, 1963) is a Swedish semi-retired professional skateboarder and part-owner of H-Street Skateboards and Osiris Shoes. Magnusson gained significant fame throughout the 1980s by inventing several tricks and becoming one of the first professional skateboarders to start a rider-owned company.

== Youth ==
Magnusson was born in the municipality of Tyresö, located in the city of Stockholm, Sweden. He started skateboarding at the age of 12 on a Newporter skateboard, when skateboarding was still considered "a fad". Magnusson turned 16 and had to decide whether he wanted to go to college or continue skateboarding.

== Professional career ==
Magnusson started his career as a rider in the United States for the Uncle Wiggley Designs team in 1983. In 1987, Magnusson and his friend/partner Mike Ternasky would form the H-Street skateboarding company, and consult with skateboarding industry leader George Abuhamad to assist with production oversight and daily operations. Magnusson and Ternasky were fond of the professional Powell Peralta-style films, but lacked the required budget for similar professional productions and wanted to showcase innovative skater progression at a faster rate. Ternasky and Magnusson soon forged a new path to DIY home-edit videos and sign some of the era's most innovative skaters to the team. Names like Ron Allen, Matt Hensley, and a fourteen-year-old Danny Way.

His company would shoot some of the most popular skateboarding videos in the late 1980's and early 1990's. 1988's Shackle Me Not was considered to be a turning point as to how skateboarding videos were made, and the 1989 release of Hokus Pokus featured new team members Sal Barbier, Brian Lotti, Colby Carter, Alphonzo Rawls and Jason Rogers. T-Mag and Ternasky went on to edit and/or release six additional films under the H-Street umbrella, Not The New H-Street Video (1991), Summer Tour (1991), Life: A Soldier's Story (1991), Planet Earth: Now 'N' Later (1991), Next Generation (1992) and Lick (1993).

Magnusson was also an innovator on board design. He would design a concept called the "Hell Concave", which is a deep concave that extended from the nose of the board to the tail. In a 1983 interview Magnusson described his first model as "a very light board that has just the right amount of flex in it. The construction is very complicated and I'm not skilled enough to explain the details."

H-Street Skateboards later disbanded in 1993, and co-founder Mike Ternasky died in a car accident on May 17, 1994. After years of discussion, Magnusson, wife/partner Monica Magnussson and George Abuhamad resurrected the H-Street brand in 2013.

=== Other ventures ===
Magnusson was also one of several people who founded Osiris Shoes. Osiris was founded in 1996, and continues to produce technical footwear that is worn by several professional skateboarders.

== Other achievements ==
Magnusson is a five time winner of the Legends of Skateboard World Championships, an event held in Germany that he won each year from 2001 to 2005. He also placed 5th in the Legends division of the 2009 X-Games.

In 2024, Magnusson was inducted into the Skateboarding Hall of Fame.
