= ZJ Boarding House =

Store in Santa Monica, California, United States

Coordinates: 34°0′8.7″N 118°29′0.7″W

- Founded: December 16, 1988; 36 years ago in Santa Monica, California, United States of America
- Founder: Mikke Pierson and Todd Roberts
- Headquarters: Santa Monica, California, United States of America
- Website: http://www.zjboardinghouse.com/

ZJ Boarding House (ZJBH) is a surfboard, skateboard, snowboard, and clothing store located in Santa Monica, California, United States. The store is known for its annual surf competition in which contestants compete to catch waves while wearing Halloween costumes.

== History ==
ZJ Boarding House opened on December 16, 1988 by Mikke Pierson and Todd Roberts. The original shop was about 2,000 square feet (190 m^{2}) and occupied the front of 2619 Main Street. Roberts lived in the office at the shop and Pierson lived in his RV in Malibu. The store was originally part of Zuma Jay surf shop, a small hole in the wall shop in Malibu, California. The move to Santa Monica included a partnership with Todd Roberts (co-owner of ZJ Boarding House). Pierson and Roberts had become good friends a couple of years previous to the birth of the new shop, while volunteering to take youth from the Braille Institute surfing at the local beaches.

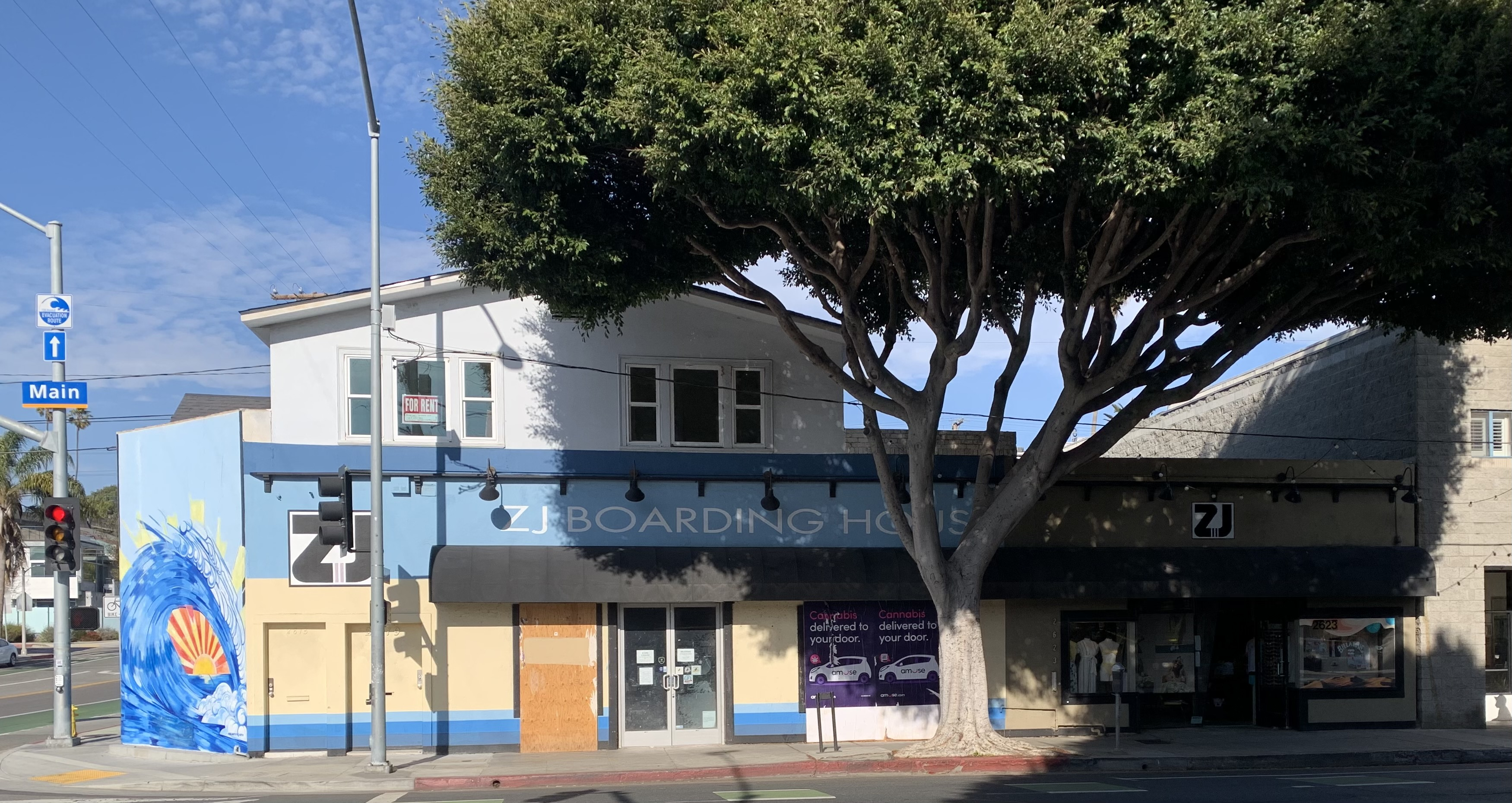
Exterior of the store as of March 2021

Since moving to the Santa Monica location, the store has been expanded to the two neighboring storefronts. In August 2020, the store announced that it was unable to reach a new agreement with the owners of the building it occupied and would close effective September 1, 2020. In December 2020, the store announced that it would reopen in Spring 2021.

== Community events ==
- ZJ Boarding House hosts a surf competition in which the competitors are in costume while surfing on the local Santa Monica beach.
- Skate 4 Africa: ZJ Boarding House teamed up with a local startup to collect old skateboard equipment to send to young skateboarders in Africa. The sport is becoming increasingly popular among the youth in Africa and is keeping them away from drugs and gangs. Most of the roads are dirt yet these young skateboarders stay determined to ride their boards and have caught the government's attention about the current road conditions.
- ZJ Boarding House often produces events that bring people in the community together. One summer they set up an outdoor showing of the surfing film Five Summer Stories.
- Michael Guffey, a skateboarder from Venice, California, won the gold medal at the ESPN X Games 16 in Los Angeles with help of his fellow ZJ Boarding House team.
