= Michael Guffey =

American skateboarder

Michael Guffey is a professional skateboarder based in Venice, Los Angeles and sponsored by ZJ Boarding House. He and his ZJ Boarding House team won gold at ESPN X Games 16 held in Los Angeles. He is featured skateboarding in the music video "Venice Cheap Skates feat. Paco" by Do It Live.
