= Hawaii Film Studio =

Coordinates: 21.2694957°N 157.7988471°W

Hawaii Film Studio, owned by the State of Hawaii's Film Office, is the first film and television studio in Hawaii and is the first state-owned film and television studio in the United States. (Note: Hawaii's nickname is Hollywood's Tropical Backlot. From 1975 to 2017, the Hawaii Film Studio was the only film and television studio in Hawaii. The Hawaii Film Office has another film and television studio in a former very large aircraft hangar at Barbers Point which was leased by Disney, Marvel Studios and IMAX in February 2017 for the ABC television series Marvels The Inhumans. The Barbers Point production facility is Hawaii's second film and television studio.)

== History ==
In 1975, CBS Productions leased 4.8 acres of land from the University of Hawaii at Manoa for the television series Hawaii Five-O. The land was part of the 52 acres that the University of Hawaii's Board of Regents had acquired from the former Fort Ruger in 1974. The Hawaii State Legislature later transferred control of the property to the Hawaii State Department of Business, Economic Development and Tourism. From 1980 to 1988, it was the home for Magnum, P.I.. In the late 1980s, the studio expanded to 7.5 acres. In the early 1990s, a sound stage was added.

The Hawaii Film Studio was the home for Jake and the Fatman, Raven, The Byrds of Paradise, One West Waikiki, Baywatch Hawaii, Hawaii, North Shore, Lost, The River, and Last Resort; movies-of-the-week; episodic television shows such as Beverly Hills 90210 and ER (Africa episodes); documentaries; commercials; and feature films such as Final Fantasy, Blue Crush, Tears of the Sun, The Rundown, and 50 First Dates. As of December 2017, the studio is currently the home to the new Hawaii Five-0.

The studio began undergoing renovations in 2014. In 2015 the cottages where props and costumes are stored were replaced. In 2017, $3.3 million was spent on the next phase of the renovation.
