= Ron Allen (skateboarder) =

American skateboarder

Personal information
- Full name: Ron Allen
- Nationality: American
- Born: 1962 (age 63–64) Visalia, California, U.S.

Sport
- Country: United States
- Sport: Skateboarding

Ron Allen (born December 31, 1962) is a goofy-footed American skateboarder from Visalia, California. Allen, living and working in Oakland, California, is a well-known California street and vert skater who had parts in H-Street videos, Shackle Me Not and Hokus Pokus.

== Skateboarding career ==
Allen is one of the nation’s first black professional skateboarders and one of the first to obtain a major corporate sponsorship. The first company to sponsor Allen was Gullwing Trucks. After placing third in an amateur contest in Santa Barbara, Vision Street Wear started to sponsor Allen. In 1989, Allen left Vision for the newly founded H-Street, alongside John Schultes, Colby Carter, Art Godoy, Tony Magnusson, Danny Way, Chris Livingston, Aaron Vincent, John Sonner, David Nelsen, Matt Hensley, Sal Barbier, and others.

After H-Street, Allen started his own company with Mike Ternasky called Life, a name based on the De La Soul song called Living In a Fulltime Era. Soon after starting Life, Sean Sheffey joined the team. Two years later, Ternasky left Life for Plan B Skateboards. Life ended because Allen and the other members of the company weren’t happy being associated with H-Street, so they moved to Deluxe & called it Fun Skateboards. The team consisted of Jesse Niehaus, John Reeves, Keith Hufnagel and others. After Fun, Allen founded American Dream Inc with the artist Alyasha Moore, who Allen met in 1996. Moore designed a deck for Allen with Dexter Woods of the San Francisco chapter of the Black Panthers on it. In 1999, Allen founded and released a bamboo board on his new company Energy, standing for: Enough Nonsense Every Rider Get Yours.

In 2007, H-Street reissued Allen's Ben Outlook board with art by Jeff Klindt. In 2008, Allen joined Creation skateboards at the age of 44. Additionally, Allen worked as team manager at High Grade Distribution, the company that distributes Creation; however, as a stint as team manager, Allen went back to being strictly a Pro.

Allen had a part in the 2016 documentary “The Blackboard”. The film, by Marquis Bradshaw, a Minot, North Dakota attorney and filmmaker, which explored the issue of racial identity among African Americans through the lens of skateboarding.

In 2024, Allen was inducted into the Skateboarding Hall of Fame.

Allen is recognized for his unique variation on the Ollie North. Allen is known for his unique style where he often leans back on his rear leg.
