= Living Lahaina =

American reality television series

- Country of origin: United States
- Original language: English
- No. of seasons: 1
- No. of episodes: 8 (5 unaired)

Production
- Executive producers: Dustin Nichols; Jeff Altrock; Jesse Ignjatovic; Nick Tromontano
- Running time: 21 minutes (excluding commercials)

Original release
- Network: MTV
- Release: April 17 – May 1, 2007

Living Lahaina is an American reality television series on MTV. The series, filmed over a three-month period on location in Lahaina (on the island of Maui, Hawaii), focused on a group of twenty-something surf instructors and their father-figure-boss at the Royal Hawaiian Surf Academy. Living Lahaina also followed cast members throughout travels to Indonesia, California, and Kauai.

Living Lahaina premiered on April 17, 2007, on MTV and was scheduled to run for eight episodes. However, only 3 episodes were shown on MTV.

Following the style of MTV's Laguna Beach: The Real Orange County, The Hills, and Maui Fever, Living Lahaina was shot in the format of a scripted television show (rather than in the style of a traditional reality show or documentary). Cast members did not speak directly to the camera. Instead, the show made use of a Dukes of Hazzard style voice-over narrative periodically throughout each episode, to give background or sum up storylines.

== Episodes ==
No.	Title	Original release date
1	"All About Alex"	April 17, 2007
2	"Lanai Of The Beholder"	April 24, 2007
3	"A Man Alone"	May 1, 2007
4	"Men at Work"	N/A
5	"Indo"	N/A
6	"Strangers in a Strange Land"	N/A
7	"Sean Gets in a Fight"	N/A
8	"Gator Would Go"	N/A

== See also ==
- Maui Fever
