= KCDC (skateshop) =

Skateshop

Coordinates: 40°43′01″N 73°57′45″W

- Founded: November 2001; 24 years ago in Brooklyn, New York, United States of America
- Founder: Amy Ellington
- Website: https://kcdcskateshop.com/

KCDC, also known as KCDC Skateshop, is a skateshop formerly located in the Williamsburg neighborhood of Brooklyn, New York City.

== History ==
Opening in 2001, KCDC was first located at North 10th Street. The first location of KCDC catered to the NYC skate community by providing access to ramps in addition to the retail skateshop. Founded by Amy Ellington, KCDC makes an effort to support Women and LGBTQ+ skateboarders. Throughout its history, KCDC's location remained in Williamsburg despite rising rents, until 2024 when Ellington closed the physical location of the skate shop due to rising rents.

In 2022, KCDC released a hightop Nike SB Dunk in a pink and black colorway.

KCDC is recognized for hosting community skate events, including art shows, music events, meet-and-greets, and a Valentine's Day skate night. Additionally, KCDC produces their own skate videos featuring local skateboarders.

=== Videos ===
- The Rent is Too Damn High, 2024

=== Locations ===
- 90 N. 11th Street, Brooklyn, NYC (2006)
- 80 N. 3rd Street, Brooklyn, NYC (-2024)
