= Dustin Nichols =

American actor

- Born: Houston, Texas
- Education: Stratford High School
- Occupation: Actor
- Height: 5 ft 7 in (170 cm)

Dustin Nichols is an American actor. He has appeared in the TV series Jessica Jones, Panic, Unwrapped, The Deuce, and Manifest.

== Education ==
Nichols was born in Houston, Texas. He attended Briarmeadow Charter School, where his interest in acting began as he acted in commercials for the YMCA franchise. Afterwards, he attended Stratford High School in Houston, Texas, where he was cast in multiple plays and musicals.

== Career ==
In 2015, Nichols acted in the play 39 Steps at the Stratford High School’s Playhouse, which was adapted from Alfred Hitchcock's 1935 film. He acted in the play with Jack Goss, Keeley Flynn, and Cameron Munoz.

After graduating from Stratford High School, Nichols was booked for an Off-off-Broadway play in New York City called Pooka. At the age of 18, Nichols moved to Manhattan to begin working as a professional actor, and was part of the SAG-AFTRA union.

Nichols has acted in the film All the Little Things We Kill with Danielle Brooks (who has also acted in Orange Is the New Black). He has also appeared in a TV series pilot called Panic, and was on an episode of the Food Network series Unwrapped.

In 2019, Nichols acted in the horror film My Last Halloween, directed by Jeff Gress. The film will also star Shawnee Smith, who played Amanda from the horror franchise Saw. Nichols will be playing the role of Kevin Preston.

He has also acted in an episode of the TV show Jessica Jones on Netflix, The Deuce on HBO, and Manifest on NBC. In the Jessica Jones episode "Hellcat", he played the role of Miles.

Nichols is currently represented by Stewart Talent in New York and managed by Serendipity Entertainment in New York and LA. He is also the stand-in for the Jets members in the upcoming Steven Spielberg movie Westside Story. In addition, Nichols has appeared in various television commercials.

== Award nominations ==
In 2016, he was nominated for Best Leading Actor in the 14th Annual Tommy Tune Awards for his role in the musical Anything Goes.
