= Brian Lotti =

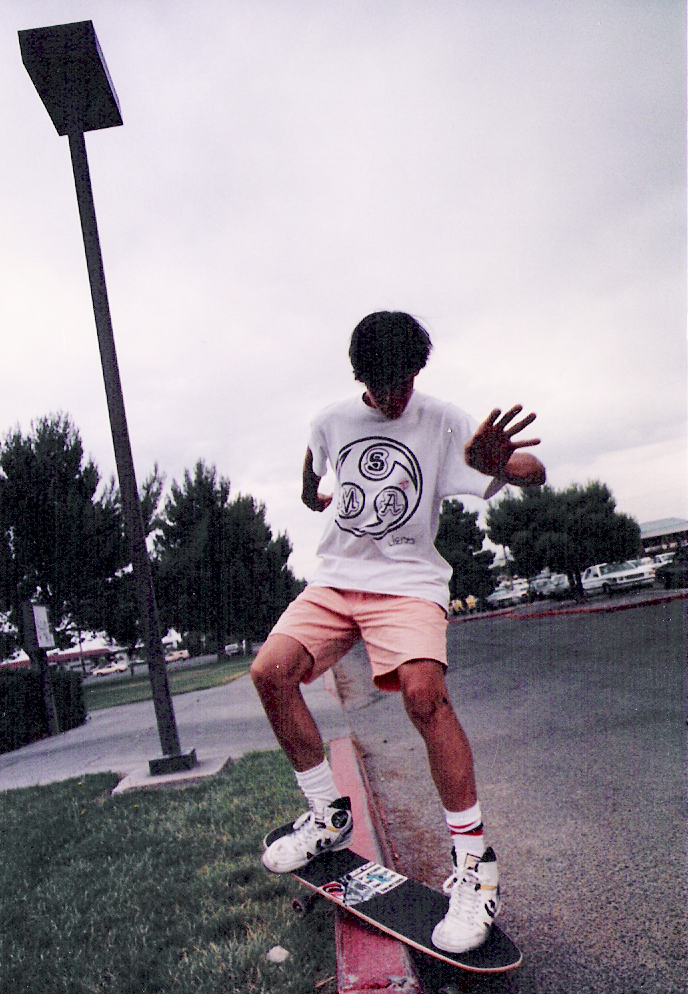
- Brian Lotti in 1988 (photo: Jared Eberhardt)
- Occupation: professional skateboarder

Brian Lotti (born 1972, Okinawa, Japan) is an American professional skateboarder, film-maker, and visual artist. Lotti rose to fame in the skateboarding world in the late 1980s while riding for H-Street Skateboards. He is known for his fluid skateboarding style and inventing the "Big Spin" skateboard trick.

== Professional skateboarding ==
Lotti's popularity peaked in the early 1990s while he was sponsored by skateboard company Planet Earth and appeared in the 1991 Planet Earth video Now N' Later. After moving on to ride for Blind Skateboards, Lotti left the world of professional skateboarding and moved to Honolulu, Hawaii.

Following his return to the skateboarding industry, Lotti completed filming a part in the 2007 Santa Cruz Skateboards "Legends" video. In 2009 Lotti founded his own company, Telegraph Skateboards, and all of the skateboard decks featured original design work by Lotti and his associates. However, as of March 2014, the brand is no longer operational—its web-site is nonexistent and its products are no longer sold.

=== Bigspin ===
As one of the originators of today's technical street-skating, Lotti brought several tricks to the forefront of skateboarding such as the frontside bluntside. He also invented the backside tailslide flip-out and the Bigspin. The Bigspin was done by skateboarders before Lotti but the catchy name caught on. The name was derived from a Californian lottery at the time with the name Bigspin. The person who named the trick the Bigspin saw Lotti do one and chose the name because his last name sounds like the word lottery.

== Visual art ==
Following his initial departure from professional skateboarding, Lotti became an attendant for Roshi Robert Aiken at the Palolo Valley sangha. There he studied Buddhism and went on to further his education at the University of Hawaii. Lotti then moved back to the mainland and attended California State University at San Francisco, where he graduated with a degree in art.

Following university, Lotti moved to Northern California to concentrate on his art career. After a few years of living on the San Juan Ridge, he moved to Los Angeles. Lotti has designed board graphics for skateboard companies and brands, such as Cartel, Cliche, Listen, Stereo, Death Skateboards, Almost, and the now-defunct Adio Skateboards.

In early 2016, Lotti participated in "The Art of a Political Revolution," an event in Los Angeles which showcased art that supported the presidential campaign of Bernie Sanders. Lotti designed new cover artwork for the 10-year anniversary reissue of Midlake's album The Trials of Van Occupanther.

In September 2018, Lotti collaborated with Adidas Skateboarding to reissue the brand's Campus 80s sneakers with his label and apparel.

== Film-making ==
Lotti's most recent appearance in the skateboarding world has been as the director of a film called "1st and Hope" about a day devoted to skateboarding in the streets of downtown Los Angeles. His follow-up film Free Pegasus—about skating through the streets of Barcelona, Spain—was released in 2008 and featured professional skateboarders Clint Peterson and Cooper Wilt.
