= Osiris Shoes =

American skateboarding clothing company

- Industry: Skateboarding Footwear
- Founded: 1996
- Headquarters: Oceanside, California
- Products: Skateboard shoes, clothes, hats, accessories
- Parent: Meios Inc
- Website: www.osirisshoes.com

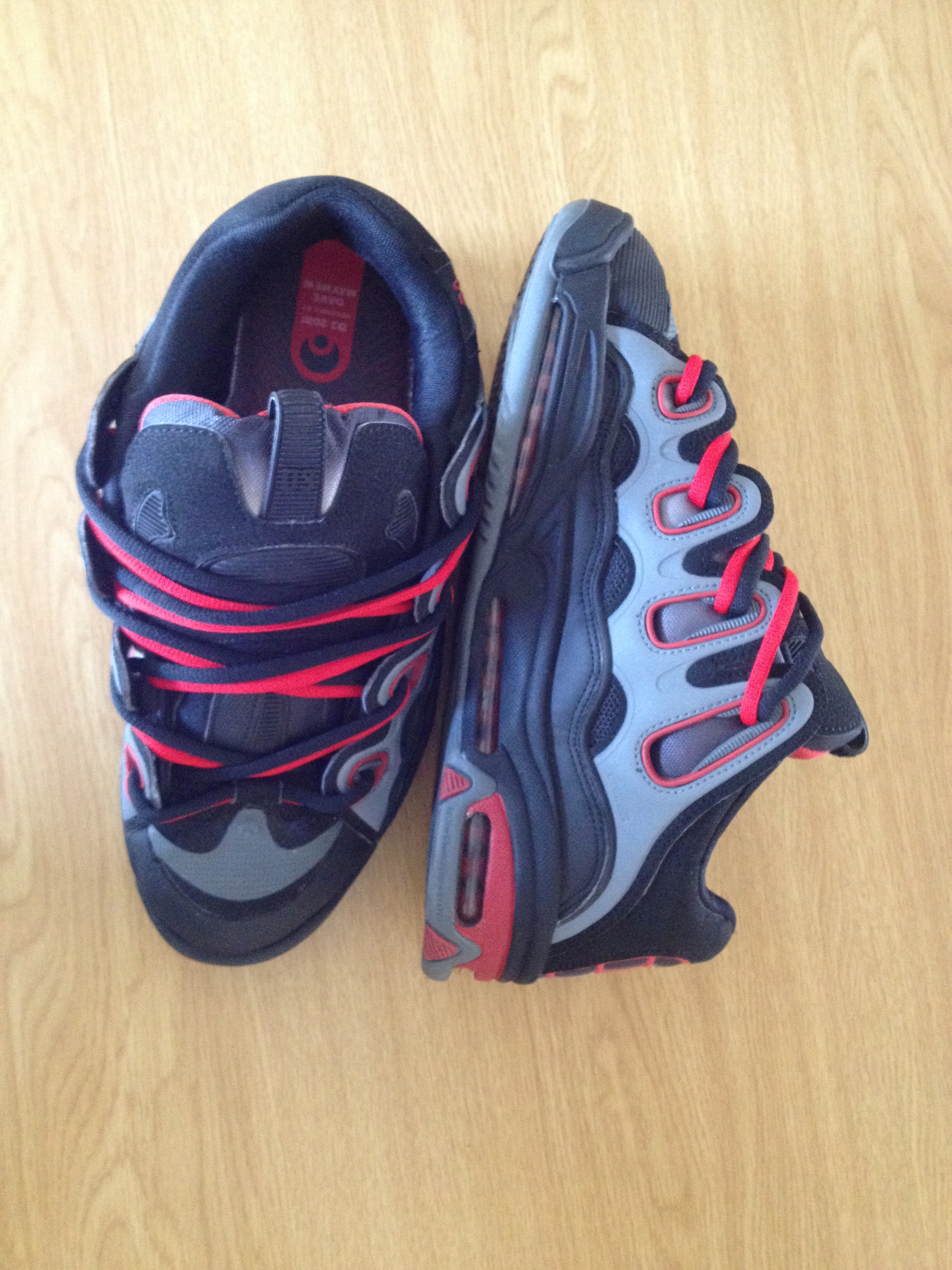
A pair of Osiris D3 2001 shoes

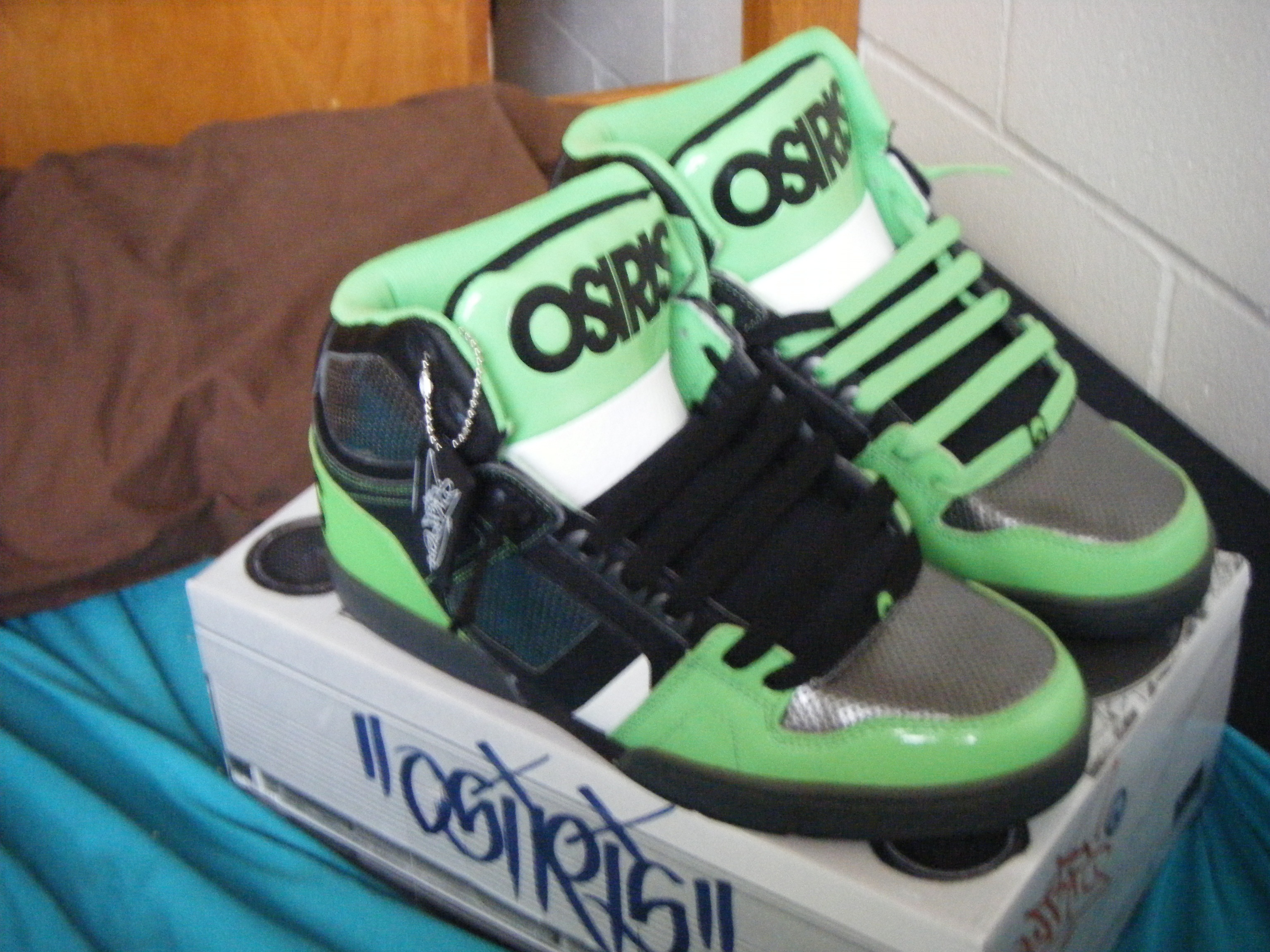
Osiris NYC 83 shoes

Osiris is a skateboard clothing brand founded in California by Swedish skater Tony Magnusson, Brian Reid, Tony Chen and Doug Weston. Osiris was founded in 1996. Before October 2014 the company sponsored skateboarders, BMX riders and surfers.

== D3 ==
Dave Mayhew designed the shoes upper, while Brian Reid designed the D3's lower and rear. Brian later designed the D3 2001 shoes with Tony Magnusson. The design was inspired by a shopping trip with Dave Mayhew (who later endorsed the shoe) during which athletic shoes and a hiking boot were purchased. The second version of the shoe, the D3 2001, became very popular. Osiris then released a lighter and less bulkier version called the D3 NTX. The D3 4.0 and a D3 Snowboarding boot followed, both influenced by the original design.
