= Sal Barbier =

American skateboarder

- Born: Salvador Lucas Barbier; July 12, 1969 (age 57); Baton Rouge, Louisiana, U.S.
- Other name: SLB
- Occupation: Designer Creative director

Salvador Lucas Barbier or SLB (born July 12, 1969) is an American designer, creative director, and former professional skateboarder.

== Early life ==
Barbier was born and raised in Baton Rouge, Louisiana.

== Career ==
An early pioneer of the signature skate shoe market, Barbier designed and endorsed the Etnies SLB 23, a shoe critically regarded as "one of the most iconic skate shoes of all time." The shoe design, initially released in 1993, has been reissued many times over due to continued demand. Following up the SLB 23 with his signature MID and 97 editions from ES Footwear, Barbier's design innovations contributed to the progression and evolution of modern skateboarding shoe design. In addition to the innovative design, these shoes also became the blueprint for skateboarding footwear endorsement deals.

As a professional skateboarder, Sal was one of the six members of the original Plan B lineup. One of his trademark moves, the “Sal Flip” is ingrained in modern skateboarding culture, and featured in popular skateboarding video games, instructional guides and training apps. He was the first professional skateboarder to maneuver a kickflip to board slide on a handrail and perform a front side big spin boardslide on a handrail. His legendary skills were immortalized in the classic 1989 skate video Hokus Pokus.

Barbier founded and directed several skate companies that shaped the market of the 90’s, and still have an influence on many of today’s brands. In his role as a creative director, Sal continues to work with the limited-edition Aesthetics Skateboards, and select collaborations.

=== Skate video parts ===
- 1989: Hokus Pokus - H-Street Skateboards
- 1991: This Is Not The New H-Street Video - H-Street Skateboards
- 1991: Schlossbach - Turn The Other Cheek
- 1991: Frontline Video - Quiet Storm
- 1992: Questionable - Plan B Skateboards
- 1993: Virtual Reality - Plan B Skateboards - video dedicated to Salvador Lucas Barbier
- 1994: Second Hand Smoke - Plan B Skateboards
- 1996: Eastern Exposure Zero - Dan Wolfe
- 2019: Boys Of Summer 2 - Logan Lara
