= Skate shop =

Type of store that sells skateboard parts and skateboarding apparel

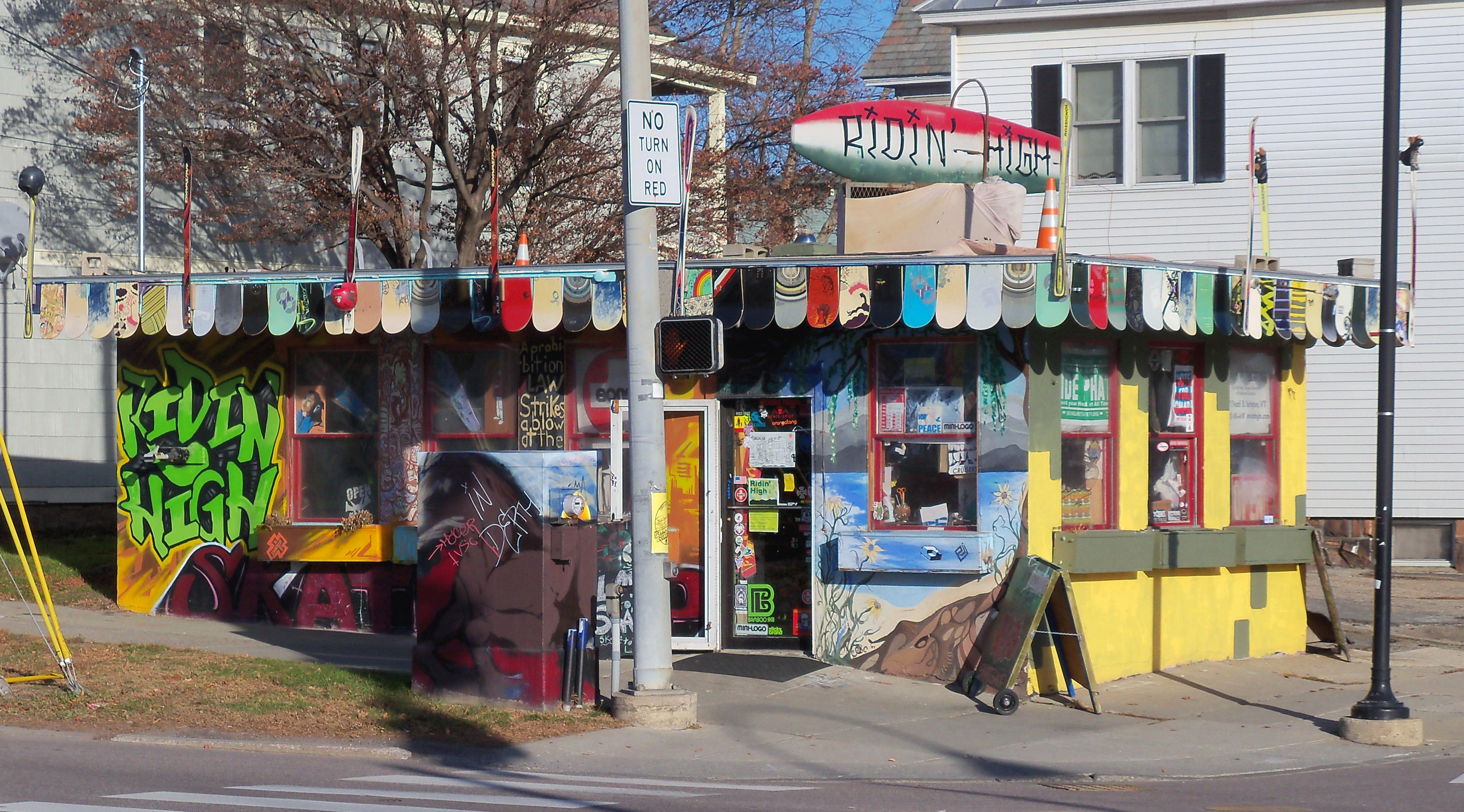
Ridin' High Skate Shop in Burlington, Vermont

A skateshop is a type of store that sells skateboard parts and skateboarding apparel. When financially possible, skate shops sponsor local riders and promote skateboarding locally through skate videos and demonstrations, referred to as "demos".

== History ==
In 1962, the surf shop "Val-Surf" in Hollywood became the first skate shop when they carried the first self-produced skateboards. These boards, sold complete, featured a surfboard shape and roller skate trucks.

Professional skateboarder Jeff Grosso referred to skate shops as "Jedi temples for skateboarding".

== Notable skate shops ==
- Rip City Skates - Santa Monica, CA
- ZJ Boarding House - Santa Monica, CA
- 510 Skateboarding - Berkeley, CA
- 66 6th - San Francisco, CA
- Cal Skate Skateboards - Portland, OR
- Labor Skateshop - New York City, NY
- KCDC Skateshop - Brooklyn, NY
- Skate Brooklyn - Brooklyn, NY
- Supreme - New York City, NY
- Uncle Funkys Boards - New York City, NY
- Central Skate Shop - Managua, Nicaragua
- Church of Skatan - Santa Barbara, CA
- L.A. Skate Co. - Los Angeles, CA
- Coliseum Skateshop - Boston, MA
- McGills Skateshop - Encinitas, CA
- Ridin' High Skate Shop - Burlington, VT
- Anti-Social Skateshop - Vancouver, British Columbia

== Gallery of skate shops from around the world ==
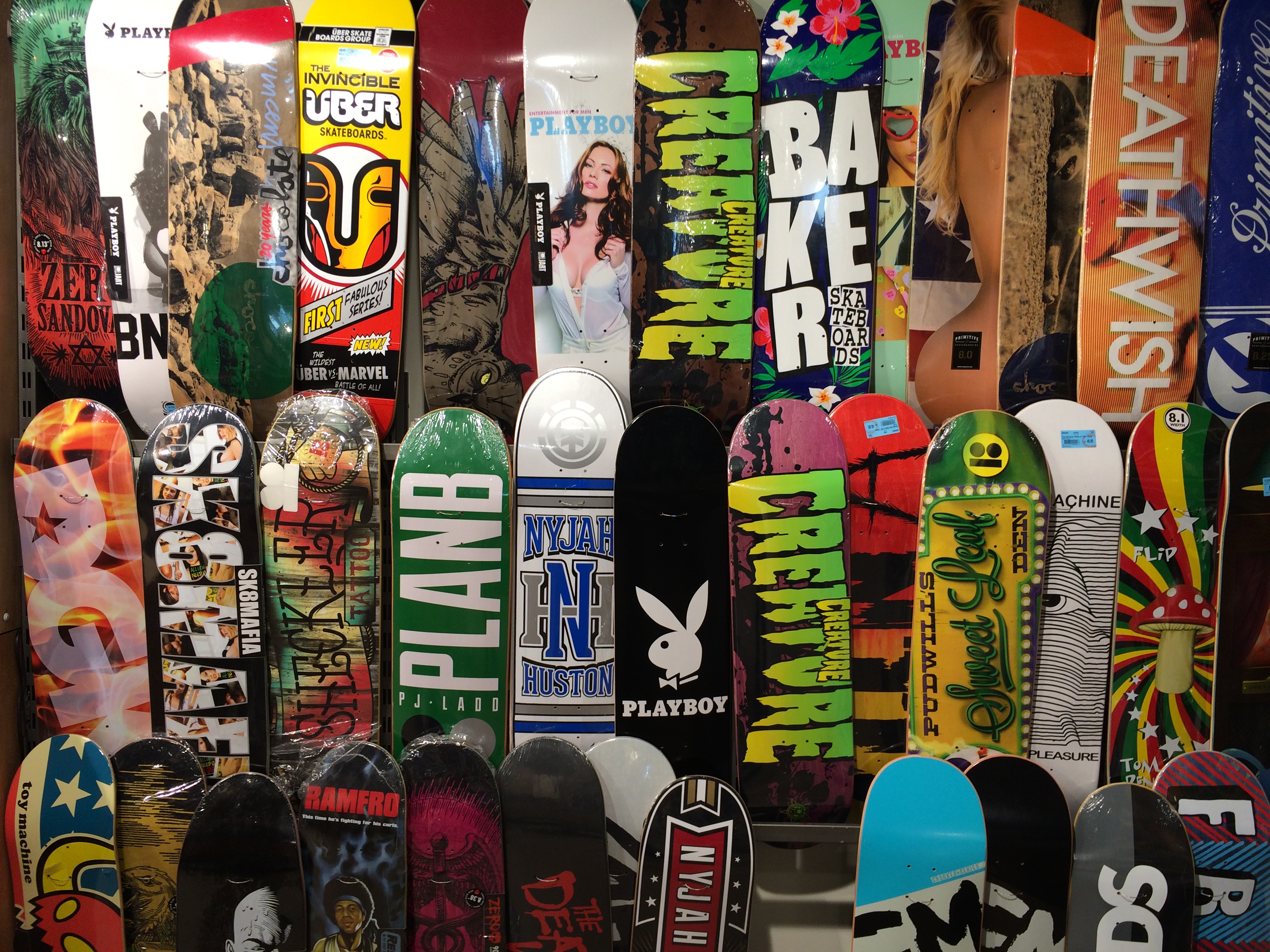

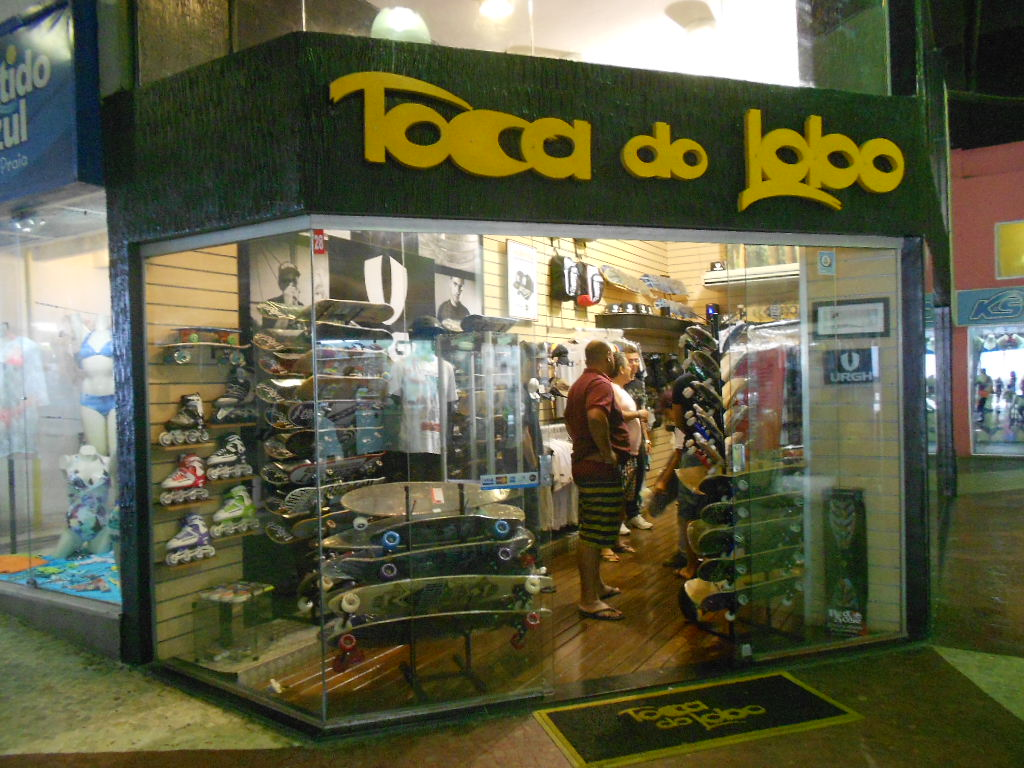

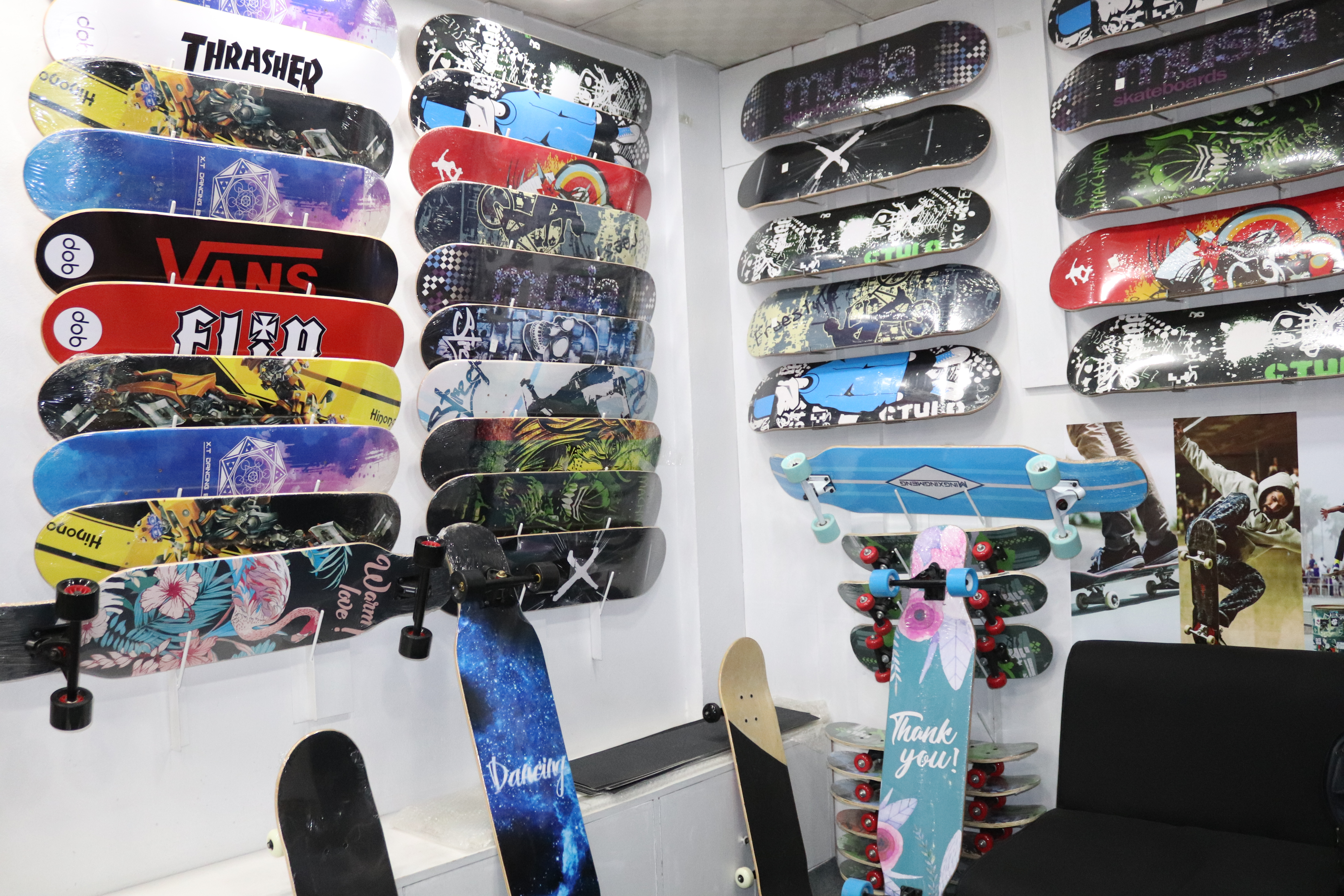

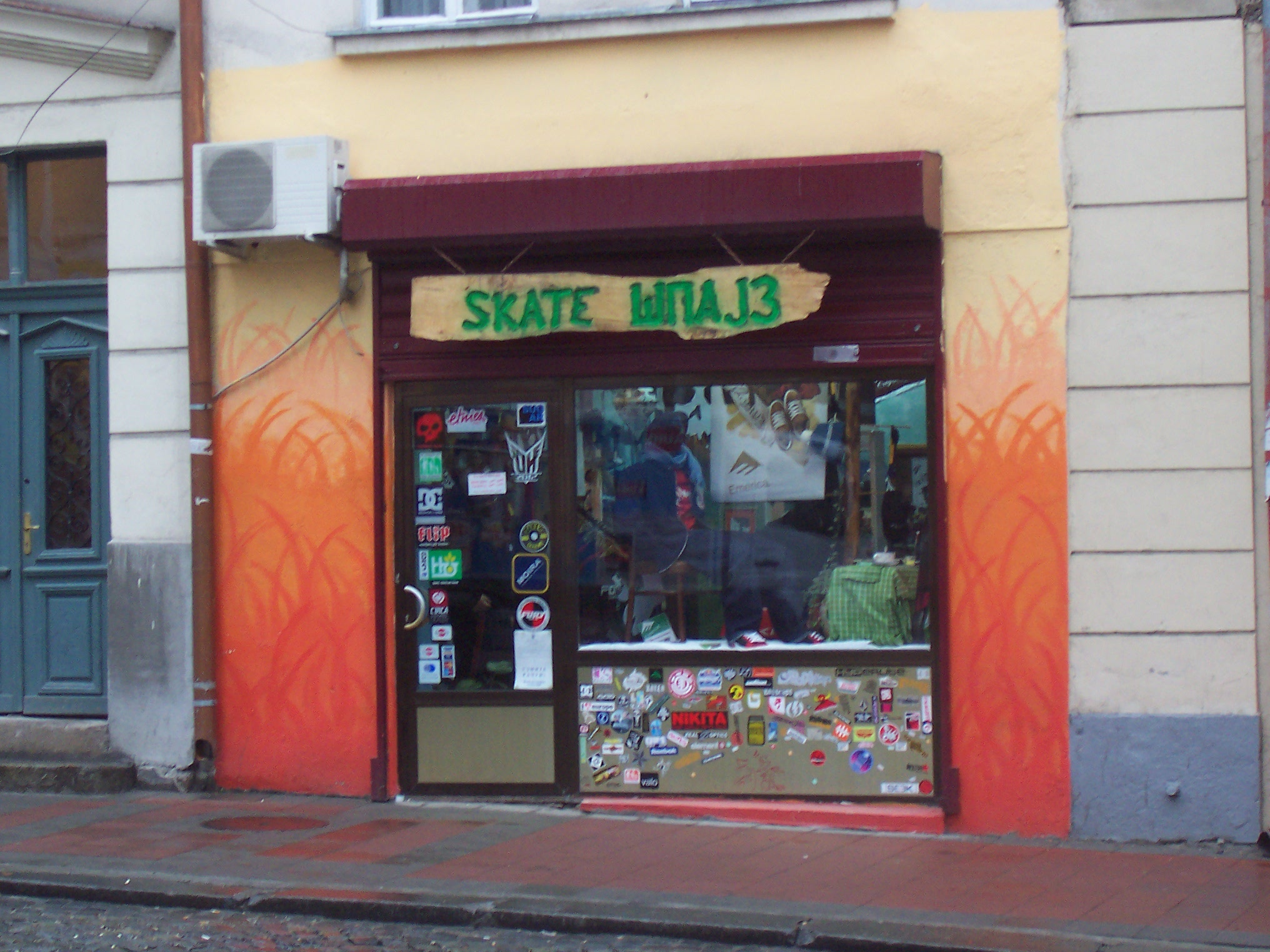

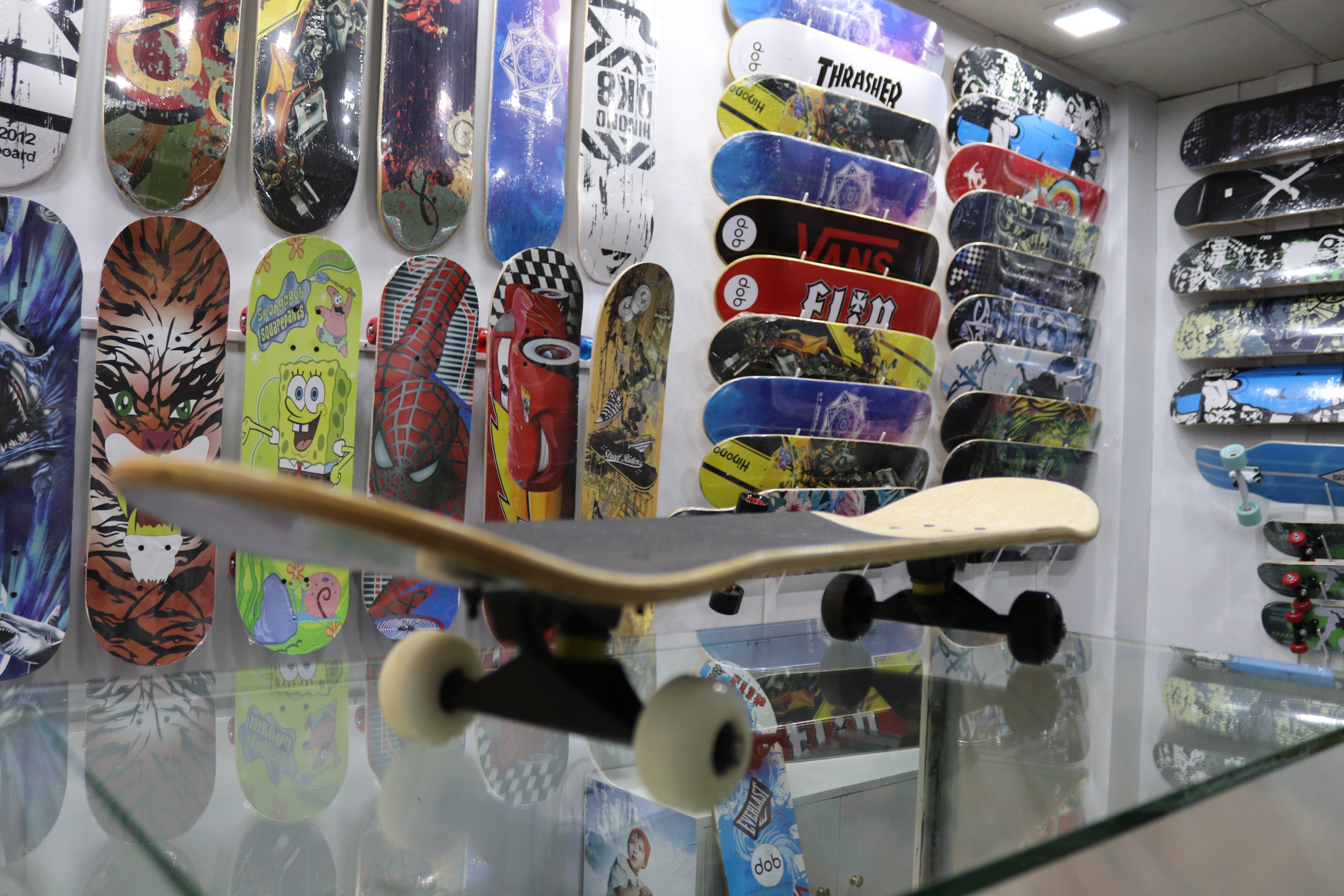

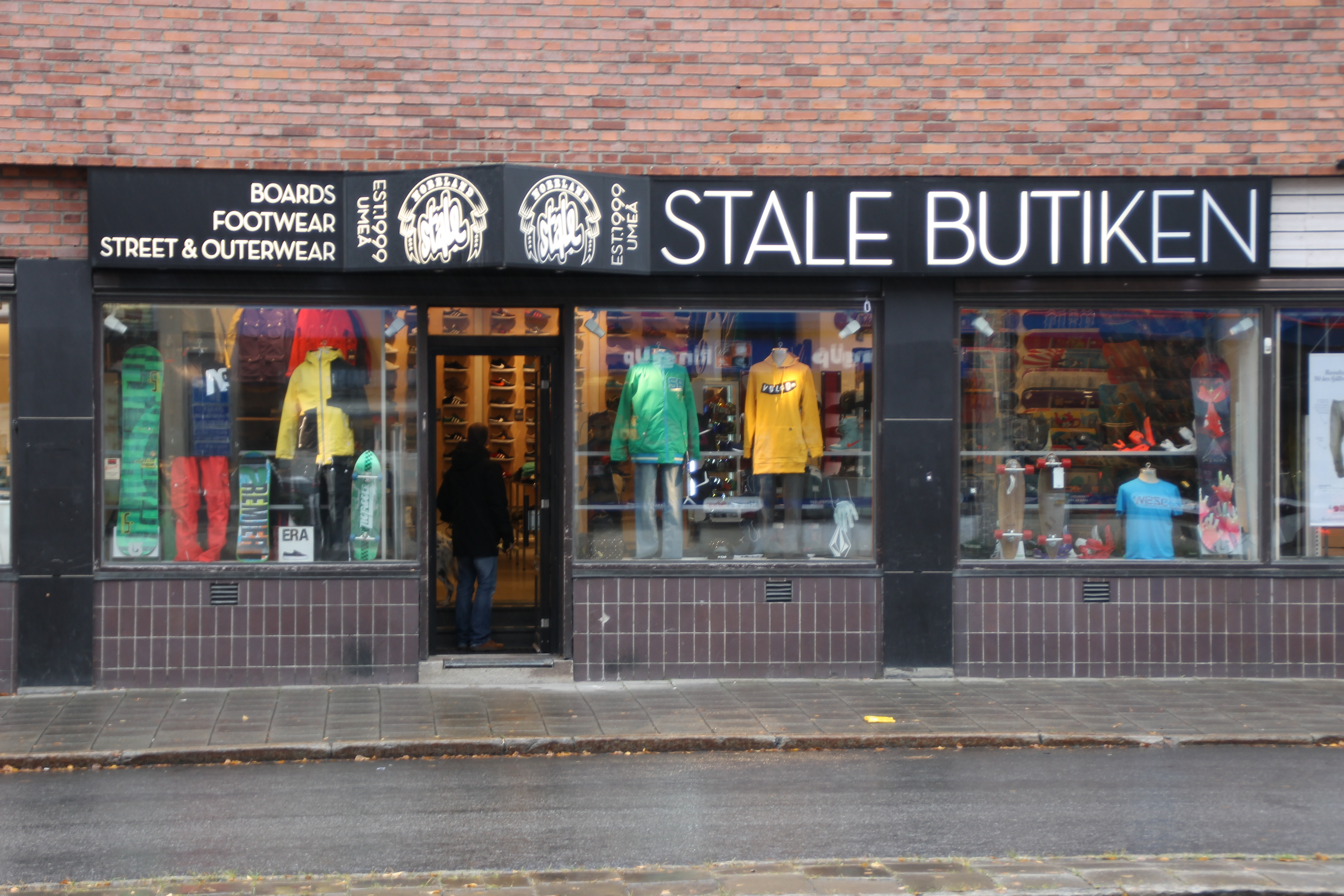

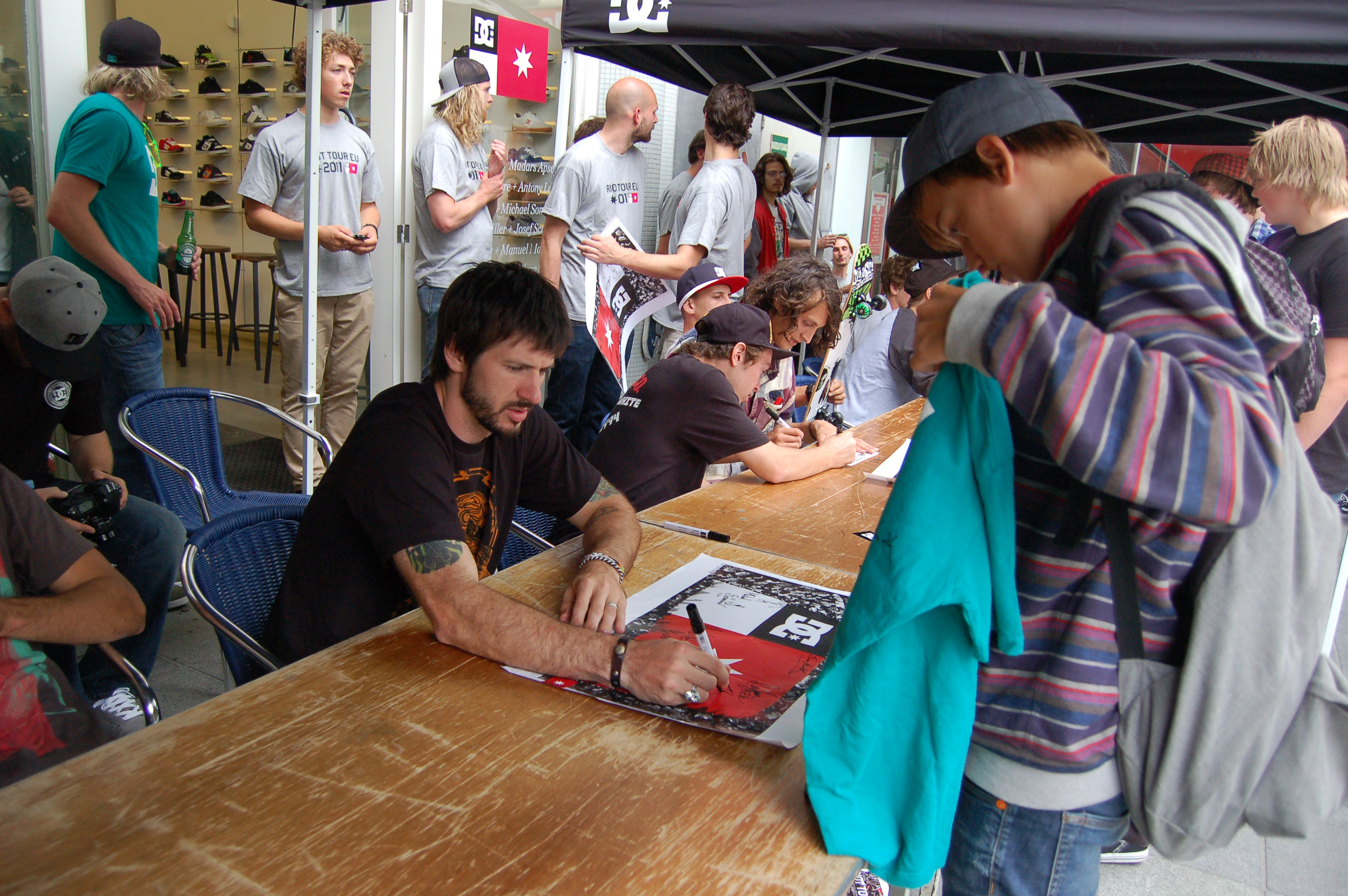

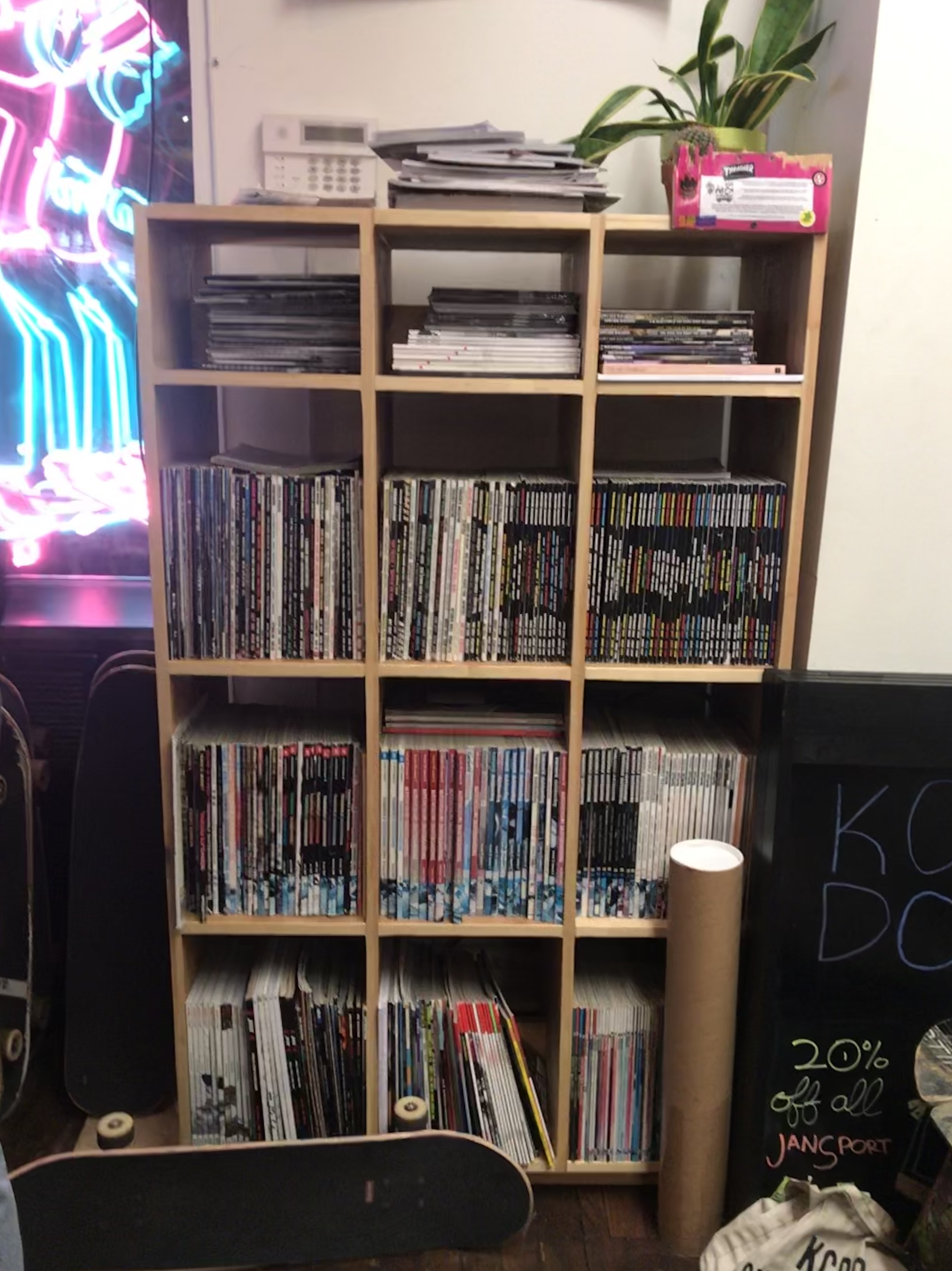

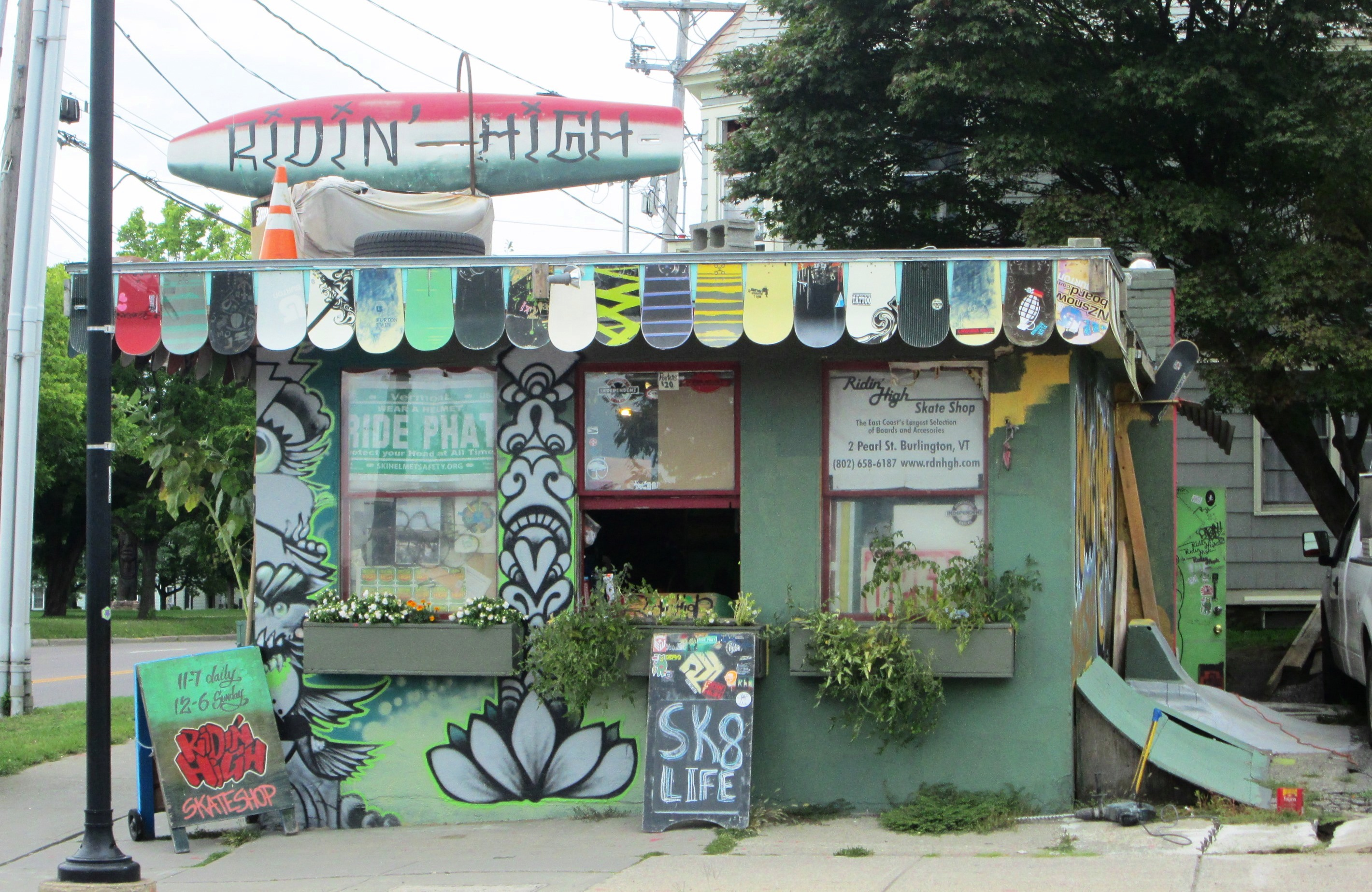

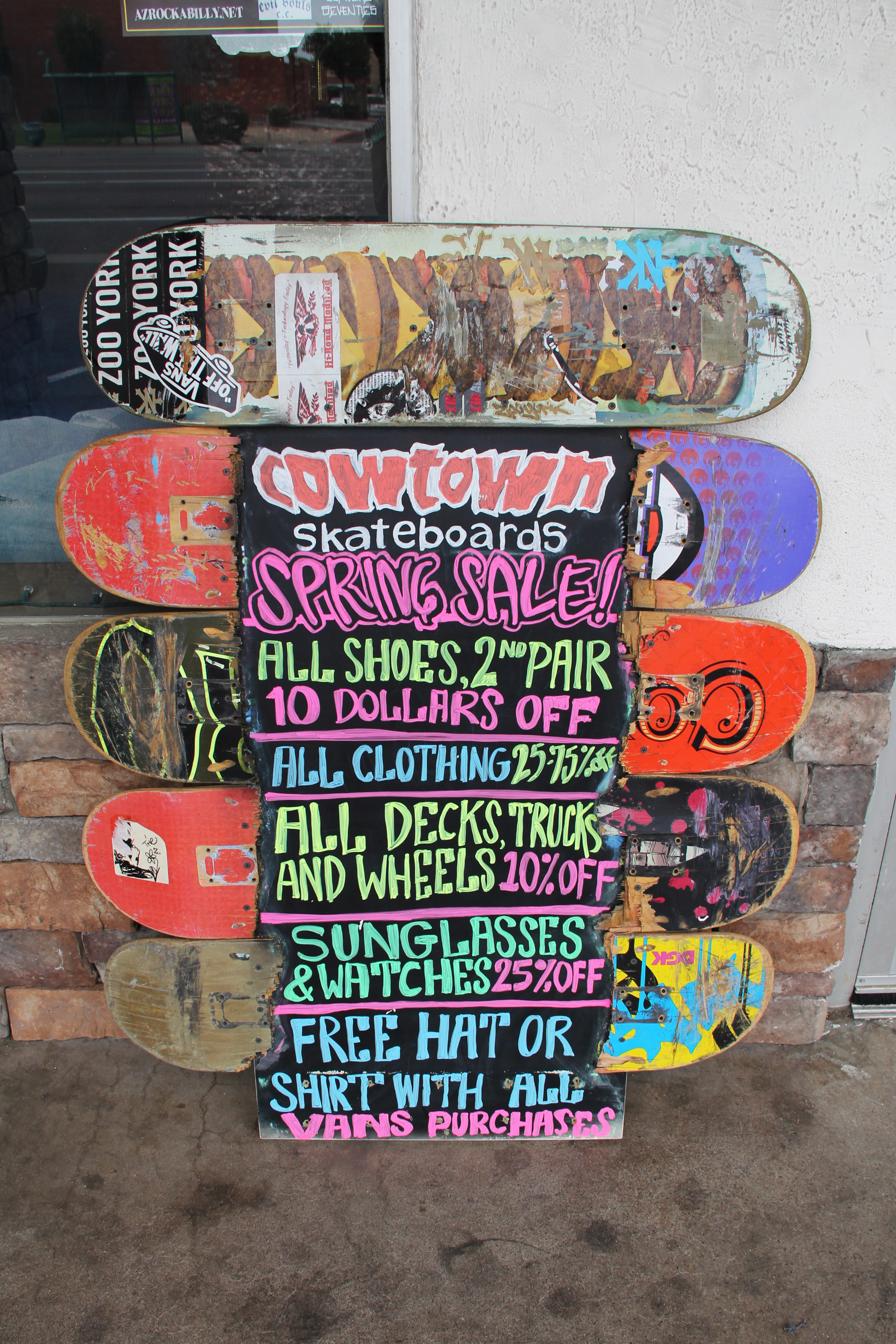

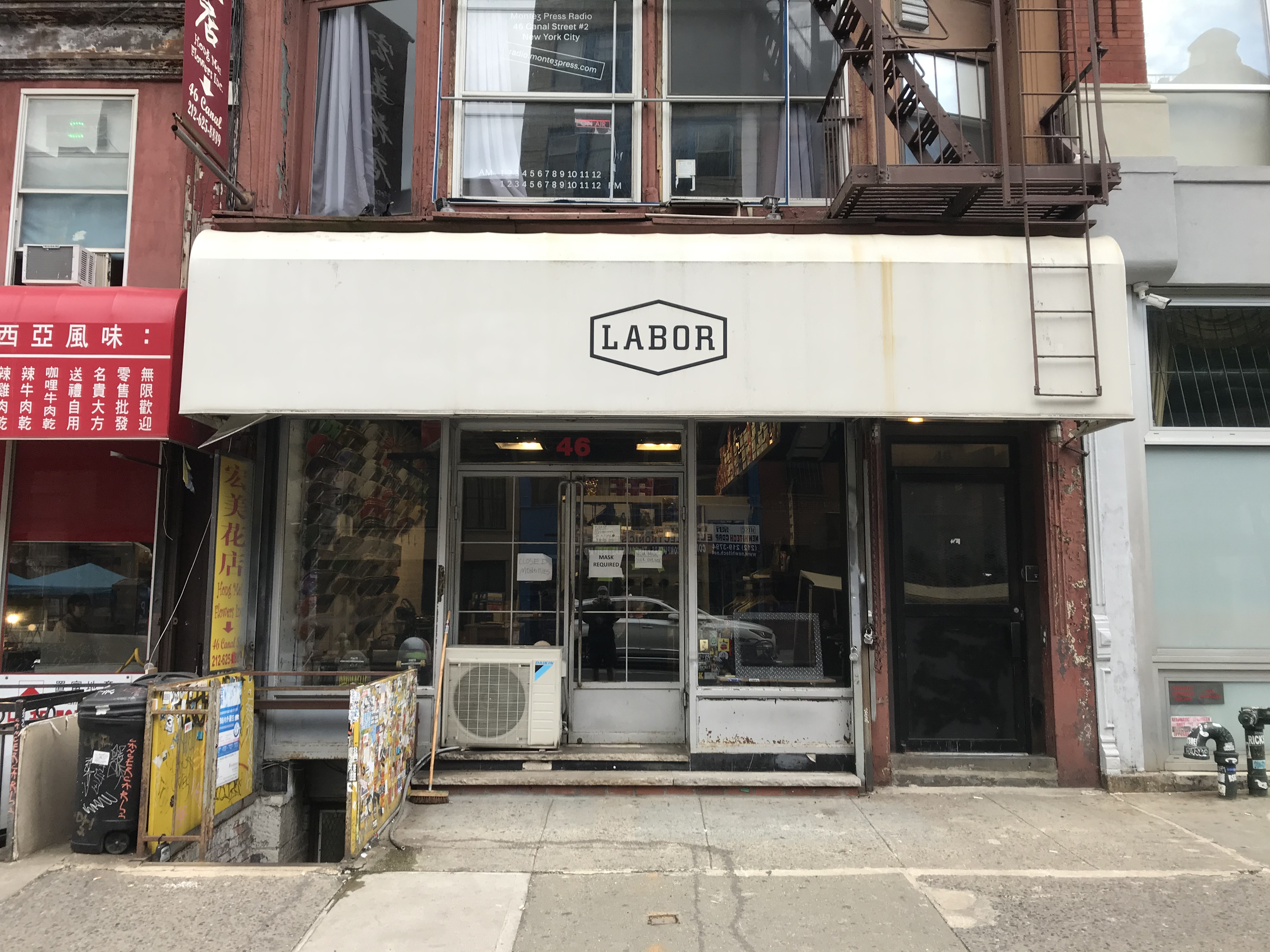

== See also ==
- List of skateboarding brands
- Surf shop
