= List of skateboarding brands =

There are many skateboarding brands from around the world, covering boards, wheels, skate shoes, and accessories including skateboarding-brand watches and wallets.

Most brands sell parts separately. A complete skateboard can be made of any brands of the products listed below.

== Decks ==
This is a non-exhaustive list of commonly available pro-branded decks, however countless other manufacturers produce unbranded decks.

- Alien Workshop
- Almost
- Anti Hero
- Baker
- Birdhouse
- Blind
- Blueprint
- Chocolate
- Creature
- DGK
- Element Skateboards
- Enjoi
- Flip
- Foundation
- Girl
- Krooked
- Mystery
- Palace
- Plan B
- Powell
- Primitive
- Real
- Santa Cruz
- Skate Mental
- $lave
- Toy Machine
- World Industries
- Zero
- Zoo York

== Trucks ==
The pro truck brands. These brands also make signature models for their sponsored skaters.

- Element Skateboards
- Independent
- Krux
- Royal
- Tensor
- Thunder
- Venture

== Wheels ==
Polyurethane wheels attach to skateboard trucks.

An asterisk next to the name denotes a company that specializes in wheels.

- Alien Workshop
- Almost
- Baker
- Blind
- Blueprint
- Cliché
- Element Skateboards
- Enjoi
- Flip
- Girl
- Mystery
- OJ Wheels*
- Pig Wheels*
- Plan B
- Ricta*
- Spitfire*
- Zero
- Zoo York

== Bearings ==
The round metal or ceramic runners which fit inside wheels, used to mount the wheels onto the axle part of a skateboard truck.

- Baker
- Blueprint
- Bones
- Chocolate
- Element Skateboards
- Enjoi
- Flip
- Girl
- Mystery
- Reflex
- Spitfire
- Zero
- Zoo York

== Hardware ==
Griptape, bolts, wax, etc.

- Element Skateboards
- Mob Grip
- Grizzly Griptape

== Apparel ==
Many skateboard brands sell apparel and accessories as well as decks, trucks, wheels and bearings. Skateboard apparel is recognized as an integral part of the skateboard scene, and has been further developed as streetwear.

- Ben Davis
- Billabong
- Blind
- Carhartt
- Chocolate
- DC Shoes
- Dickies
- Droors
- Element Skateboards
- Elwood
- Enjoi
- Ethika
- Etnies
- Famous Stars and Straps
- Girl
- Hurley International
- KR3W
- Levi's
- Lifted Research Group
- Matix Clothing
- Nixon
- Obey
- Palace
- Primitive
- Quiksilver
- Roxy
- RVCA
- Stance
- Stüssy
- Supreme
- Volcom
- X-Large
- Zero

== Shoes ==
- Adidas Skateboarding
- Adio
- Airwalk
- Buffalo
- C1rca
- Converse
- DC Shoes
- DVS
- Element Skateboards
- Emerica
- éS
- Etnies
- Fallen
- Globe
- Hurley
- iPath
- Lakai
- Macbeth Footwear
- New Balance Numeric
- Nike SB
- Osiris
- Puma SE
- Sneaux Shoes
- Supra
- Vans
- Vision Street Wear
- WeSC
- World Industries
- Zoo York
