= King of the Road (skateboarding) =

Skateboarding award

- Sport: Skateboarding
- Founded: 2003
- Founder: Michael Burnett
- Country: United States, China (2011)
- Website: Official website

King of the Road is an American skateboarding tournament held by Thrasher magazine, founded by its editor Michael Burnett in 2003.

== History ==
The tournament involves three or four teams of professional skaters competing over a two-week period. All teams are given "The Book", which contains a series of challenges. The challenges themselves typically involve hard skateboarding tasks and humorous ones, such as making out with a certain number of women, or getting a tattoo. There are various points available for each challenge, usually dependent on how difficult or uncomfortable the challenge is. The teams travel across numerous American cities to complete as many of these challenges as possible.

The tournament was held annually from 2003 to 2007, with each of these years being released on DVD. In 2010, the tournament was returned, however would be released as an Internet series going forward, instead of a DVD. In 2011, Thrasher and Converse hosted a special one-off edition of the competition in China, with the participation of four Chinese skateboard brands.

Later on, Thrasher would sign an agreement for Viceland to broadcast the 2015 tournament, and this agreement would continue for the next two years. Ultimately, Viceland did not renew the rights to distribute any future King of the Road tournaments after the 2017 edition, and there has yet to be any held since.

== Tournaments ==
=== 2003 ===
Deluxe (1st place)	Tum Yeto (2nd place)	Volcom (3rd place)	éS (4th place)
Dan Drehobl	Ethan Fowler	Rune Glifberg	Eric Koston
Darrell Stanton	Gareth Stehr	Caswell Berry	Rick McCrank
JT Aultz	Diego Bucchieri	Dustin Dollin	Paul Rodriguez
Ernie Torres	Johnny Layton	Dennis Busenitz	PJ Ladd
Tony Trujillo	Adrian Mallory	Javier Sarmiento	Alexis Sablone

=== 2004 ===
Zero (1st place)	Girl (2nd place)	Almost (3rd place)	Real (4th place)
Jamie Thomas	Eric Koston	Daewon Song	Peter Ramondetta
Jon Allie	Mike Carroll	Greg Lutzka	Dennis Busenitz
Tommy Sandoval	Rick Howard	Chris Haslam	Tony Trujillo
Chris Cole	Brian Anderson	Ryan Sheckler	Darrell Stanton
James Brockman	Jereme Rogers	Cooper Wilt	Ernie Torres

=== 2005 ===
Zero (1st place)	Habitat (2nd place)	Flip (3rd place)	Element (4th place)
Jamie Thomas	Fred Gall	Geoff Rowley	Jeremy Wray
Chris Cole	Silas Baxter-Neal	Bastien Salabanzi	Mike Vallely
Garrett Hill	Stefan Janoski	Shane Cross	Brent Atchley
John Rattray	Kerry Getz	Arto Saari	Tosh Townend
Tommy Sandoval	Danny Garcia	Alex Chalmers	Colt Cannon

=== 2006 ===
Zero (1st place)	Darkstar (2nd place)	Baker (3rd place)	Toy Machine (4th place)
Jamie Thomas	Chet Thomas	Andrew Reynolds	Ed Templeton
Chris Cole	Paul Machnau	Erik Ellington	Billy Marks
Tommy Sandoval	Gailea Momolu	Jim Greco	Josh Harmony
John Rattray	Paul Trep	Bryan Herman	Johnny Layton
James Brockman	Adam Dyet	Leo Romero	Matt Bennett

=== 2007 ===
Blind (1st place)	Foundation (2nd place)	Black Label (3rd place)	Zoo York (4th place)
Ronnie Creager	Don Nguyen	Chet Childress	Zered Bassett
Jake Duncombe	Sierra Fellers	Adam Alfaro	Aaron Suski
James Craig	David Reyes	Brian "Slash" Hansen	Anthony Shetler
Christian Johnson	Angel Ramirez	Shuriken Shannon	Lamare Hemmings
Gabriel Vedenhaupt	Abdias Rivera	Chris Troy	Brandon Westgate

=== 2010 ===
Nike SB (1st place)	C1RCA (2nd place)	Converse (3rd place)	Etnies (4th place)
Eric Koston	David Gravette	Angel Ramirez	Sean Malto
Grant Taylor	Scott Decenzo	Kenny Anderson	Mike Taylor
Ishod Wair	Sierra Fellers	Sammy Baca	Jose Rojo
Cory Kennedy	David Reyes	Julian Davidson	Willow
Justin Brock	Robbie Brockel	Eli Reed	Ryan Sheckler

=== 2011 ===
Lakai (1st place)	Vans (2nd place)	Nike SB (3rd place)	Dekline (4th place)
Guy Mariano	Tony Trujillo	Eric Koston	Chad Tim-tim
Marc Johnson	Elijah Berle	Grant Taylor	Matt Bennett
Daniel Espinoza	Daniel Lutheran	Ishod Wair	Nick Merlino
Vincent Alvarez	Johnny Layton	Cory Kennedy	Dakota Servold
Mikemo Capaldi	Gilbert Crockett	Shane O’Neill	Ryan Spencer

=== 2011 (China) ===
Gift (1st place)	Shox (2nd place)	Society (3rd place)	Vagabond (4th place)

=== 2012 ===
Alien Workshop (1st place)	Toy Machine (2nd place)	Creature (3rd place)	Antihero (4th place)
Grant Taylor	Leo Romero	David Gravette	Tony Trujillo
Gilbert Crockett	Daniel Lutheran	Taylor Bingaman	Andrew Allen
Jake Johnson	Collin Provost	Ryan Reyes	Frank Gerwer
John Fitzgerald	Jeremy Leabres	Sean Conover	Robbie Russo
Omar Salazar	Blake Carpenter	Darren Naverette	Chris Pfanner

=== 2013 ===
Birdhouse (1st place)	Enjoi	Chocolate	Real
Aaron Homoki	Cairo Foster	Elijah Berle	Robbie Brockel
Ben Raybourn	Wieger van Wageningen	Vincent Alvarez	Ishod Wair
Clint Walker	Zack Wallin	Raven Tershy	Justin Brock
Clive Dixon	Jimmy Carlin	Stevie Perez	Jake Ruiz
Mike Davis	Louie Barletta	Justin Eldridge	Kyle Walker

=== 2014 ===
Birdhouse (1st place)	Element (2nd place)	Flip (3rd place)
Aaron Homoki	Nyjah Huston	Curren Caples
Clive Dixon	Evan Smith	Louie Lopez
Clint Walker	Julian Davidson	Alec Majerus
Mike Davis	Nick Garcia	Ben Nordberg
Ben Raybourn	Dominick Walker	Matt Berger

=== 2015 [Season 1 on Viceland] ===
Birdhouse (1st)	Toy Machine (3rd)	Chocolate (2nd)
Aaron Homoki	Blake Carpenter	Raven Tershy
Clive Dixon	Billy Marks	Justin Eldridge
Clint Walker	Daniel Lutheran	Johnny Jones
Mike Davis	Axel Cruysberghs	Elijah Berle
Ben Raybourn	Collin Provost	Stevie Perez

Mystery guests: Heath Kirchart (Birdhouse), Forrest Edwards (Toy Machine), Jereme Rogers (Chocolate)

=== 2016 [Season 2 on Viceland] ===
Enjoi (1st place)	Deathwish (3rd)	Creature (2nd)
Louie Barletta	Mike "Lizard King" Plumb	David Gravette
Jackson Pilz	Jake Hayes	Kevin Baekkel
Ben Raemers	Jon Dickson	Sean Conover
Enzo Cauleta	Jamie Foy	Chris Russell
Zack Wallin	Neen Williams	Willis Kimbel

Mystery guests: Samarria Brevard (Enjoi), Leo Baker (Deathwish), Nora Vasconcellos (Creature)

=== 2017 [Season 3 on Viceland] ===
Element (1st place)	Real (2nd place)	Foundation (3rd place)
Madars Apse	Robbie Brockel	Aidan Campbell
Nyjah Huston	Chima Ferguson	Corey Glick
Tyson Peterson	Jack Olson	Nick Merlino
Mason Silva	Kyle Walker	Dakota Servold
Evan Smith	Zion Wright	Cole Wilson

Mystery guests: Jamie Foy (Element), Aaron Homoki (Real), Axel Cruysberghs (Foundation)
