= Karl Watson =

American skateboarder

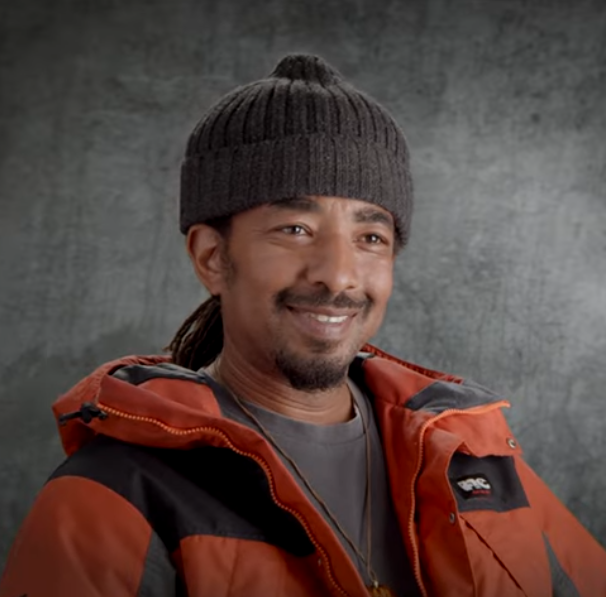
- Watson in a 2025 interview

Personal information
- Born: September 22, 1976 (age 49) Richmond, California, U.S.
- Home town: Oakland, California, U.S.

Sport
- Country: USA
- Sport: Skateboarding

Karl Watson (born September 22, 1976) is a regular-footed professional American skateboarder, skate video director, and author from the San Francisco Bay Area.

== Early life ==
Watson was born in Richmond, California and raised in San Francisco.

== Skateboarding ==
Karl Watson was given his first skateboard on Christmas day in 1987. Three years later, Watson received sponsorship, at the age of 13, and at 17, while still at McAteer High School, Watson turned pro for Clean skateboards. Watson's first sponsor was Dogtown skateboards and his first full skate video part was in DTS, The Video (’91). The first time Watson's name appeared on a board was with his second sponsor, Think Skateboards, with the Missing Children deck, featuring Watson alongside Nick Lockman, Sam Smyth, and Shawn Mandoli. Released in 1995 on Profile skateboards, Watson's first solo deck graphic was based on an "afrocentric" stick-figure scene Watson appropriated from a work of art his mom had hanging on her wall. Additionally, Watson released a deck with a popular graphic for Mad Circle skateboards depicting a man with dreads.

Watson is known for his laid back skate style.

Watson's first signature skate shoe was released by IPath Footwear in 2000. Throughout his career, Watson skated for Mad Circle Skateboards, Organika Skateboards, and Blind Skateboards. In 2008, Watson directed Zach & Walker's Concrete Jungle with Matt Daughters for Organika Skateboards.

In 2005, Watson worked with Keith "K-Dub" Williams and Adjoa Murden in advocating for the construction of a skatepark in Oakland, a successful effort that would become Town Park skatepark. Watson also worked with Williams on the Hood Games, a mixing of hip-hop and skateboarding culture.

In 2018, Watson and Nick Lockman founded Maxallure. The founding team consisted of Watson, Lil Dre, Jonathan Perez, De Marquis McDaniels, Tafari Whitter, and Marcello Campanello.

== Writing ==
In 2017, Watson collaborated with illustrator Henry Jones, writing a children's book: My First Skateboard Book. Watson's book introduces children to the world of skateboarding.

== Personal life ==
Watson is a father and a pescatarian. Watson had a tumor on his pineal gland.

Watson currently manages the Adidas flow team.
