= Zero Skateboards =

American skateboard company

- Founded: 1996
- Founder: Jamie Thomas
- Headquarters: Carlsbad, California, U.S.
- Website: zeroskateboards.com

Zero Skateboards is a skateboard company located in Carlsbad, California, United States. The brand was founded by professional skateboarder and entrepreneur Jamie Thomas, and distributed by his Black Box Distribution company. In late June 2014, Thomas announced that the brand would be distributed by the Dwindle Distribution company, based in El Segundo, California. Subsequently, in 2016, Thomas and Dwindle announced that Zero Skateboards would be operated independently by Thomas.

== History ==
The Zero brand was originally a clothing company, formed in 1996, and subsequently evolved into a skateboard company, with Thomas leaving Toy Machine to become Zero's first professional team rider.

In early 2003, Thomas opened a plant in Tijuana, Mexico, named "Edieth and Osuna", to manufacture the skateboard decks of the Black Box brands. Zero team rider Chris Cole was a shareholder of the company from 2011 to 2014.

The company has released seven videos, with the premiere of the latest release, Cold War, occurring on November 8, 2013. The premiere was held at the La Paloma theater in Encinitas, California, and Thomas invited every Zero rider, former and current, onto the stage prior to the showing of the 40-minute video.

=== Transition to Dwindle ===
In a June 2014 interview with the Jenkem online publication, Thomas explained that the Dwindle Distribution company—responsible for the Enjoi, Blind Skateboards, Almost Skateboards, Darkstar and Cliché Skateboards brands—will take over "the sales, finance, production and distribution aspects" of the Zero brand. Thomas further explained that the Zero employees will remain independent and will focus on "the team, marketing and creative aspects" of the brand. Zero celebrated its 20-year anniversary with a photo art show in June 2016.

== Awards ==
From 2004 to 2006, Zero won three consecutive Thrasher Magazine King of the Road competitions, beating other teams such as Girl Skateboards, Toy Machine, Darkstar, Element, Flip, Habitat, Real, Almost, and Baker Skateboards. Zero declined defending their title for the 2007 King of the Road to start the "Black and White" tour with the Mystery skateboard team.

Zero rider Chris Cole won Thrasher S.O.T.Y. award (Skateboarder of the Year) on two occasions, a feat that has only been achieved by four skateboarders in the history of the award (the other skateboarders are Danny Way (1991/2004), Tyshawn Jones (2018/2022) and Jamie Foy (2017/2024)).

== Popular culture ==
- The graphic of the skull used on their "Small Skull"/"Single Skull Mini" board is nearly identical to the skull seen on the shirt worn by Sid Phillips in the 1995 animated film Toy Story. Coincidentally, Sid Philips is also depicted as enjoying skateboarding.
- Soundtrack "I'm Gonna Be (500 Miles)" of John Rattray's part in Dying to Live video, originally performed by The Proclaimers, was twice covered by MxPx and Down By Law, in 2009 and 1994, respectively. Soundtrack Another Girl, Another Planet of Garrett Hill's part in New Blood video, originally performed by The Only Ones, was also covered by Blink-182 and included to their Greatest Hits album, which was also released in the same year with "New Blood" video.

== Videography ==
=== Full length ===
- Thrill of It All (1997)
- Misled Youth (1999)
- Dying to Live (2002)
- New Blood (2005)
- Strange World (2009)
- Cold War (2013)
- Damn It All (2020)
- Painkiller (2021)
- Heaven's Gate (2024)
- After Forever (2026)

=== Short length ===
- Promo (2006)
- Less Than Zero (2024)
- Nob0dy (2025)

=== Collaborations ===
- Fresh 'til Death (feat. DGK) (2011)

=== Series ===
- No Ca$h Value (2014)

== Team ==
=== Professional ===
- Jamie Thomas
- Tommy Sandoval
- Jon Allie
- Adrian Lopez
- Ryan Sheckler
- David Reyes
- Winsdor James
- Tony Cervantes
- Chris Wimer
- Gabriel Summers
- Forrest Edwards
- Brandon Burleigh
- Kanaan Dern
- Adam Arunski
- Bam Margera

=== Amateur ===
- Reggie Kelly
- Jonno Gaitan
- Colin Lambert
- Motic Panugalinog
- Gustavo Servin
- Vinny Dalfio
- Ade Andrian
- Kairi Netsuke

=== Former ===
- Chris Cole
- Dane Burman
- Erik Ellington
- Jim Greco
- John Rattray
- Elissa Steamer
- Cordell Studley
- Tom Asta
- Shane Schilder
- Marisa Dal Santo
- Ed Duff
- Ben Gilley
- Ryan Smith
- Lindsey Robertson
- Garrett Hill
- Jamie Tancowny
- Nick Boserio
- Sheldon Meleshinski
- Ryan Bobier
- Keegan Sauder
- Matt Mumford
- Niels Breed
- Tom Karangelov
- Donovon Piscopo
- James Brockman
- Ben Hatchell
- Josiah Gatlyn
- Franky Villani
- Scott Copalman
- Aaron Harrison
- Wade Burkitt
- Jud Ferguson
- Micah Mattson

=== Guest collaborations ===
- Misfits
- Megadeth
- Dead Moon
- Graveyard
- Liquid Death
- Corey Duffel
- Leo Romero
- Rachelle Vinberg
- Ronnie Creager
- Orville Peck ( country singer)
- PLEASURES
