= Black Box Distribution =

Former American skateboard distributor

- Industry: Skateboarding
- Founded: 2000
- Founder: Jamie Thomas
- Defunct: 2014
- Fate: Dissolved
- Headquarters: Carlsbad, California, United States
- Products: Skateboards
- Owner: Jamie Thomas

Black Box Distribution was a skateboard distributor owned by professional skateboarder Jamie Thomas. Prior to October 2014, it served seven brands, three of which were owned by Thomas: Fallen Footwear, Mystery Skateboards, and Zero Skateboards. After the company was dissolved, Zero and Fallen moved to Dwindle Distribution.

== History ==
The company was founded in 2000 as a way for Jamie Thomas to distribute his Zero Skateboards brand, which had been founded as the Zero Division apparel brand in 1996. The brand was initially supported by American distributor Tum Yeto (responsible for distributing Thomas' previous skateboard deck sponsor Toy Machine). The company's headquarters was in Carlsbad, California. Prior to its closure in 2014, it distributed Zero Skateboards, Fallen Footwear, Slave, Threat, Destroyer, Mystery, and New Balance Numeric brands.

In 2006, Thomas won an Ernst & Young regional Entrepreneur of the Year Award as founder/president of Black Box. The company eventually spun off Cinco Maderas, a Mexico-based woodshop that manufactures the skateboard decks for Mystery, Slave, and Zero.

Black Box announced a partnership with surf and skate clothing label Insight in mid-2009. At the time of the announcement, Thomas explained: "My personal opinion is that Insight is a rad brand, and I think that's what matters most ... it's the raw elements and passion behind what it is more so than what category it supports most, whether it be surf, skate, or fashion. It's so original and raw that I find it inspiring."

=== Transition to Dwindle ===
In a June 2014 interview with the Jenkem online publication, Thomas explained that the Dwindle Distribution skateboard company—responsible for the Enjoi, Blind Skateboards, Almost Skateboards, Darkstar, and Cliché Skateboards brands—would take over "the sales, finance, production and distribution aspects" of the Zero and Fallen brands. Thomas further explained that Zero employees would remain independent and focus on "the team, marketing and creative aspects" of the brand. However, in an October 2014 interview, former Zero rider Chris Cole stated that the entirety of Black Box had moved to Dwindle, so the exact terms of the transition are unclear.

== Zero Skateboards ==
=== Team (as of July 12, 2018) ===
==== Professional ====
- Jamie Thomas
- Chris Wimer
- Tommy Sandoval
- James Brockman
- Jon Allie
- Dane Burman
- Tony Cervantes
- Windsor James

== Fallen Footwear ==
Fallen Footwear is a skate shoe company that was founded as a partnership between Thomas and DC Shoes in 2003.

=== Team (as of June 7, 2015) ===
- Jamie Thomas
- Tony Cervantes
- Tommy Sandoval
- Brian "Slash" Hansen
- Dane Burman
- Jon Dickson

== Slave Skateboards ==
Slave Skateboards (styled as $lave Skateboards), owned by former Black Box artist Ben Horton, was launched under the distribution company in 2007. The brand's debut full-length video, Radio-Television, premiered in September 2009.

=== Team (as of June 7, 2015) ===
- Jon Allie
- Matt Mumford
- AJ Zavala
- Jon Goemann
- Anthony Schultz
- Pat Burke
- Frecks
- Danny Dicola
- Conhuir Lynn
