= The Buszy =

Skatepark in Milton Keynes, England

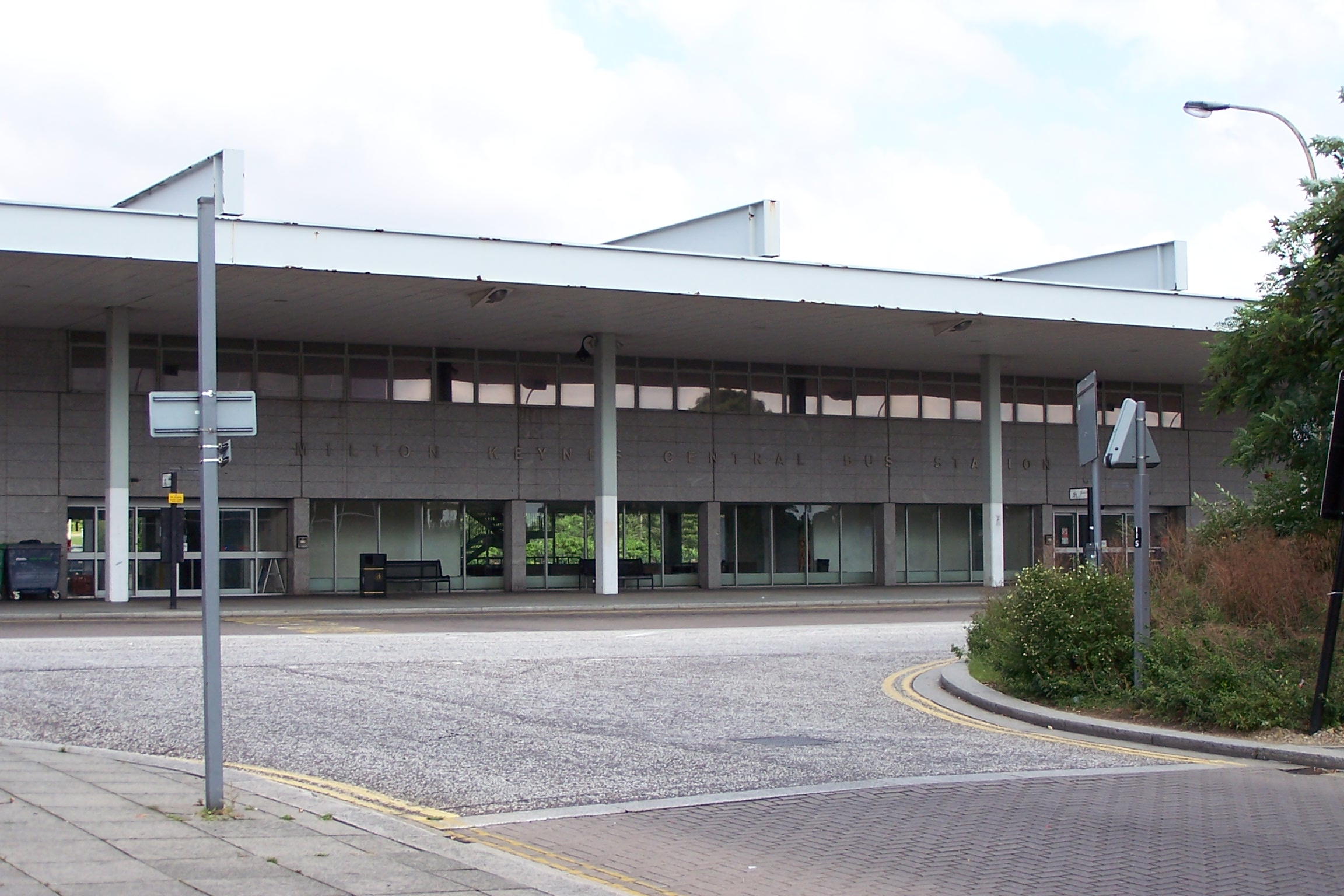
- Milton Keynes central bus station in 2006.
- Interactive map of the The Buszy area

General information
- Architectural style: Modernism
- Location: 401 Elder Gate, Milton Keynes, MK9 1LR., Milton Keynes, England
- Coordinates: 52.03416°N 0.77038°W

Other information
- Public transit access: Bus and rail transport interchange at Milton Keynes Central railway station

The Buszy, built in 2005, is a skatepark plaza in Milton Keynes, England. The skate area is covered almost entirely by the roof of the former Milton Keynes Central bus station. Its founders believe it to be the first purpose-built skatepark in the world.

Pronounced "Buzzy" (/ˈbʌzi/) by the locals, the bus station, including the plaza that sits underneath its roof, is grade two listed.

== History ==
=== The early years ===
The Buszy has always been a focal point of the skateboard scene in Milton Keynes, even before it became a designated area to skateboard. Long before the area was designated a skateboard plaza, Chris Ince and his family owned and ran the One Stop Café inside the bus station. They sold skateboard products to the local skaters who skated the granite ledges and open flat ground areas around the station. The first skateboard competition was held at the Buszy in 1992, attended by between four and five hundred people. The Ince family, Chris, Jennifer, Steven and Damian built Radlands indoor skatepark that same year.

=== The SK8MK Project ===
In 2002, the SK8MK project started with the aim of tackling tensions surrounding skateboarding and the need for an area in the city that was dedicated to skating.

— mkskate.org (Ryan Gray, Jen Kavanagh, Caterina Loriggio and Ben Powell)

Local skateboarder and cinematographer Lindsay Knight was instrumental in helping the local council understand the needs of the local skateboarders, making a video to help the Chamber of Commerce understand street skateboarding. He countered the actions of the local police, who had supported the criminalisation of skateboarding in Milton Keynes.

=== The Elder Gate Crew ===
The Buszy is historically the home of the Elder Gate Crew (EGC), a group of locals who skated at the spot together regularly. With the stewardship and cinematography skills of member Carter Hewlett, they released two skate videos documenting skateboarding at the Buszy during the late 2000s, named "The Elder Gate Crew Video" and "Get to Know".

=== MK Skate ===
In May 2019, MK Skate, a project exploring the history of skateboarding in Milton Keynes, was founded, going on to secure £97,800 in National Lottery Heritage Funding. To celebrate Milton Keyne's contribution to skateboarding, MK Skate delivered a city centre trail, an exhibition shown between 27 September to 22 December 2019, and a book. A permanent record of Skateboarding in Milton Keynes has been stored in the city's archive and the Milton Keynes Museum.

== Park layout ==
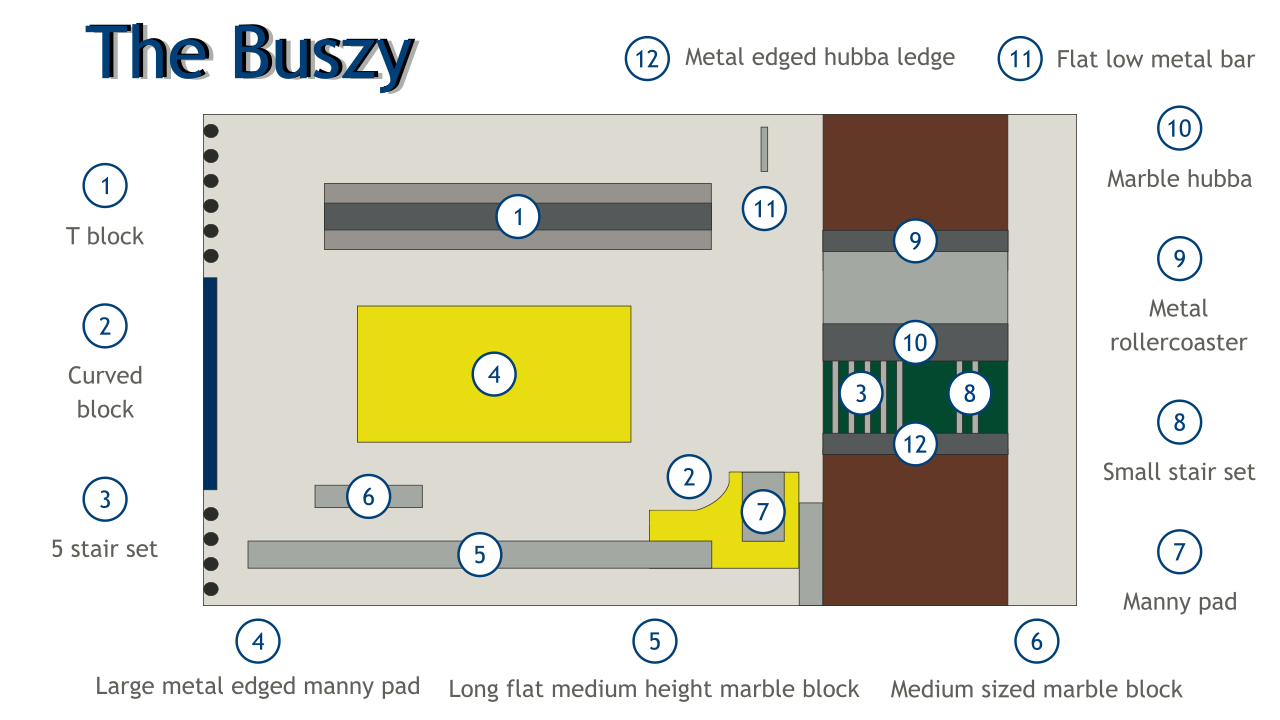
The layout of the Buszy

== Competitions and demos ==
Since 1992, there have been many small events held at the Buszy by skateboarders in collaboration with local businesses and charities with both national and international professionals in attendance.

=== Notable events ===
There have been many jams, demos and competitions at the Buszy. The plaza has held demos and received visits from renowned professional skateboarding teams such as Girl Skateboards, Flip, Zoo York, DC, Element, Blueprint and Matix Clothing.

==== Battle of The Buszy ====
On 2 June 2007, Plan B Skateboards sent a team of Skateboarders to the Buszy to take part in a special one-off event called "The Battle of The Buszy". The group included professional skateboarder Paul Rodriguez.

==== Go Skateboarding Day ====
Each year on 21 of June, there is a regular meeting of locals at the Buszy on Go Skateboarding Day. The event is loosely organised, and there is occasionally a competition that may include a game of S.K.A.T.E..

Easy access to the Buszy by train makes Go Skateboarding Day popular for Skateboarders from around the rest of the United Kingdom to travel to the plaza and skate.

== Hip Hop ==
The plaza contains a large collection of art works as the result of many national and local graffiti artists working at the Buszy, who painted the large, free, legal wall that is situated at the near side of the designated skate area.

All of the four basic elements of hip hop: breakdancing, graffiti, MC-ing, and DJing, have local history rooted to the spot. For example, members of the band Hacktivist would come to the skate jams to perform before the group was formed, gaining worldwide fame. Dance crew Nemesis would regularly be seen practising in front of the reflective windows of the bus station.

== Charity ==
=== Make a Difference (MaD) ===
In 2005, the Community interest company Make a Difference (abbreviated to MaD), was given control of the former bus station to turn the disused building into a multi-service youth hub, funded by allowing commuters to use its carpark at a daily charge.

With a £500,000 investment from the SITA Trust and V, the national youth volunteering service, MaD spent the following ten years redeveloping the former bus station and delivered community youth services to the area.

MaD was also instrumental in the majority of the skate jams and competitions that occurred between 2005 and 2015. Events were routinely overseen by Liam Snusher.

On 19 January 2016, MaD's Buszy Twitter account announced the closure of the youth hub. The building owners, Milton Keynes Development Partnership, an agency of Milton Keynes Council, decided not to permit MaD further use of the building. The Council declined to intervene, stating that it did not have direct control of the Milton Keynes Development Partnership. The council now operates the carpark.

=== The Winter Night Shelter ===
Since MaD moved out of the building, The Winter Night Shelter has used the Buszy to provide shelter and assistance to the homeless population of Milton Keynes, which has grown significantly since sweeping local and national government cutbacks came into force.

== Business ==
The owners of the building (Milton Keynes Development Partnership) currently let the old bus station's building to the following business tenants:

- Romeo Dance Academy
- New Money Recordings

Romeo Dance Academy obtained a ten-year lease in May 2018.

== Location ==
The Buszy is on Elder Gate, opposite Milton Keynes Central railway station. Almost all local and regional buses stop there, but National Express coaches call only at the Coachway beside the M1. The site is also served by the Milton Keynes redway system, the city-wide network of shared paths for cyclists, pedestrians – and skateboarders.
