= Surfa Sam =

Australian skateboard manufacturer

- Company type: Private
- Industry: Skateboards
- Founded: 1963
- Founder: Leo Kalokorinos
- Headquarters: Rose Bay, New South Wales, Australia
- Number of locations: area served Australia and New Zealand
- Products: Skateboards
- Website: www.surfasamskateboards.com

Surfa Sam was Australia's first skateboard manufacturing companies founded in 1963 by Leo Kalokerinos in Rose Bay, New South Wales.

== See also ==
- List of skateboarding brands
