= Circa (company) =

American skateboard apparel company

C1RCA Footwear
- Founded: 1999
- Headquarters: San Clemente, California, U.S.
- Products: Skateboard shoes, clothes, hats, accessories
- Website: c1rca.eu

Circa (styled as C1RCA) is a skateboard footwear and apparel company founded in 1999 that is based in San Clemente, California. The brands first pros were Chad Muska and Jamie Thomas. It is distributed in Europe by Option Distribution.

== History and team ==
Circa began in 1999 when Chad Muska left éS following the success of the shoe he designed with them. He partnered with Four Star Distribution, launching the Circa brand. Circa's shoes at the time followed the design ethos of éS, with Muska's designs featuring multiple iterations of the "weed stash spot", something he started with the shoe he designed with éS. Some were Velcro, others were zip pockets. This has since fallen out of fashion, however there have been other brands that followed suit. Adidas and BAIT released a collaboration in spring 2016 for 4/20, the Stan Smith Vulc "Happy", which included a hemp upper and a weed stash spot in the tongue.

In a 2016 interview by Jenkem Magazine, Jamie Thomas spoke on the topic of how he left Circa. When asked why he left to start Black Box Distribution in 2000 and later Fallen Footwear in 2003, he said "I left Circa because we were supposed to launch a new sister footwear brand based on the momentum of my line, but they had some massive issues with their snowboard brands, which put them in a serious cash crunch. They quickly canned the new brand and they weren’t able to pay me for about 3 or 4 months. As that balance started to stack up, they didn’t know if or when they be able to pull out of it and pay me, so the longer it lasted, the sketchier it got. Going to DC to start Fallen didn’t seem risky at all, you can feel it when the time’s right."

When asked whether he still had an ownership stake in the company, he said "Yeah, as crazy as that is; when I left to start Fallen my stock was fully vested and they weren’t in the position to buy me out, so it’s just been there chillin. I always hoped they’d sell, but it’s been a rollercoaster for them since Muska and I left. Hopefully, they pull it off though and a few bucks will fall from the sky some day."

A milestone for the company was the release of "It's Time" in 2006, an almost 43 minute long skate video filmed in the United States with skaters Adrian Lopez, Colt Cannon, Dennis Durant, Jon Allie, Peter Ramondetta, Sierra Fellers, Tony Tave, Windsor James and Nate Sherwood.

The current team, as listed on their website, includes Adrian Lopez, James Brockman and James Martin.
