= Bobby Puleo =

American skateboarder

Personal information
- Born: October 2, 1974 (age 51) New Jersey, U.S.
- Occupation(s): Skateboarder, artist

Sport
- Sport: Skateboarding

Bobby Puleo (born 1974) is a regular-footed American professional skateboarder and artist.

== Life ==
Born in Clifton, New Jersey, Puleo began skateboarding at 10. His first board was the Skull and Sword Powell Peralta board, which he received for Christmas in 1984. Puleo started coming to New York at 16 to skate street spots, like the Brooklyn Banks and others. In 1998, Puleo moved to West 108th Street. Since childhood, Puleo has been a collector of found objects.

== Skateboarding career ==
Puleo has been a professional skateboarder for over 20 years, Puleo's first pro deck was on Mad Circle skateboards. Puleo was skating a lot with filmer Aaron Meza for the FTC Penal Code 100A video released in 1996. Scott Johnston and Meza introduced Puleo to Justin Girard who put him on Mad Circle. Before Mad Circle, while riding for Metropolitan, Puleo got put on Stereo.

In 2018, Puleo sat down with Transworld Skateboarding to talk about his favorite skateboarder: Mark Gonzales.

Skate video Parts & Appearances	Year
411VM – Issue 10	1995
411VM – Issue 13	1995
FTC – Penal Code 100A	1996
Mad Circle – 5ive Flavors	1998
Zoo York – Peep This	1999
INFMS	2000
Skateparks of Oregon/Ecuador	2001
Black Out	2002
La Luz	2002
Static II: The Invisibles	2004
R. B. Umali NY Revisited Vol 1 (96–97)	2005
Ipath – Preview: Summer 2005	2005
Traffic – Moving in Traffic	2008
Traffic – Tokyo Transfer	2009
Hi Fi – Full Frequency	2009
The Secret Basement	2013
V5	2013

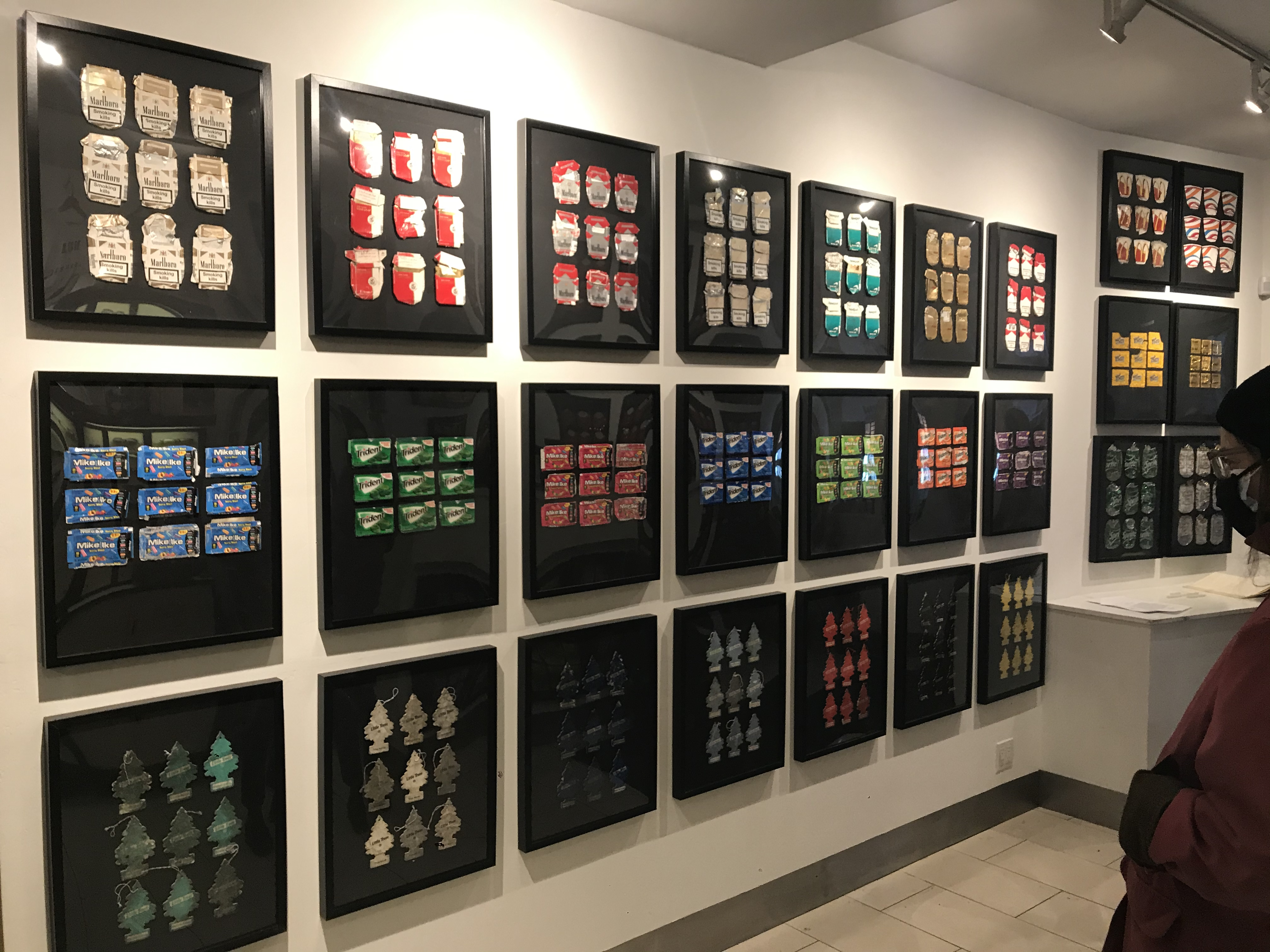
Puleo's found object collages - 2021

== Artistic practice ==
Building upon his lifelong interest in collecting found objects, Puleo creates collages and assemblages. Puleo also practices photography and has an interest in graffiti. Puleo has shown his art throughout the United States and has an instagram account dedicated to his art: Gutter Gallery In 2003, Puleo opened a show: ''These Eyes Have Eyes," at Space 1026 Gallery in Philadelphia. In 2021, Puleo had a solo show of his assemblages titled "Flat Earth" presented by Hey Check This Out gallery in NYC.
