= Skateboarding organization =

A skateboarding organization is an organization that advocates for skateboarding and the skateboarding community.

== Notable skateboarding organizations ==
- The Skatepark Project, formerly the Tony Hawk Foundation
- Andy Kessler Foundation
- Ben Raemers Foundation
- Bronx Girls Skate
- Dylan Rieder Foundation
- Look Back Library
- Make Life Skate Life
- NYC Skateboard Coalition
- Pablo Ramirez Foundation
- Rob Dyrdek Foundation
- Ryan Sheckler Foundation
- Skateboarding Hall of Fame
- Skateistan
- Tim Brauch Memorial Fund
- The Henry Gartland Foundation
