= Savier Footwear =

Skate shoe company (2000–2004)

Savier Footwear was a skate shoe company operating from 2000 to 2004 and located in Portland, Oregon.

== Company history ==
Founded in 2000 by Paul Fidrych, Savier Footwear was a short lived skate shoe company. Savier experimented with shoe material technology and designs uncommon in the skate shoe industry including partnering with Nike and using their Zoom Air technology and using a highly durable patented polymer. The company consisted of Fidrych, industry veteran Jeff Jewett, and, former professional snowboarder Rob LaVigne who was formerly in charge of Adidas’ skate program, joined by Hunter Muraira leading apparel and product. Savier sponsored notable skateboarders including Brian Anderson, Paul Rodriguez, Brad Staba, Stefan Janoski, and others. Savier Footwear closed in 2004, unable to achieve its financial goals.
