= Joey Brezinski =

American street skateboarder (born 1980)

Personal information
- Born: Joey Brezinski; July 11, 1980 (age 46) California, U.S.

Sport
- Country: United States
- Sport: Skateboarding

Joey Brezinski (born 11 July 1980) is an American skateboarder from Venice, Los Angeles, California.

== Professional skateboarding ==
The "backside tail-slide" is Brezinski's favored trick and he is well known for his manual tricks.

=== Sponsors ===
As of December 2011, Brezinski is sponsored by Cliché Skateboards, Autobahn, Diamond, Andale Bearings, Val Surf, Red Bull, Skatepark of Tampa Party Team, Siege Audio, So Rad Clothing, Tensor, Grizzly Grip, Evol Burritos, FP Insoles, AWE Tuning, and lifestyle accessories brand, AWSM.

== Contest history ==
Brezinski won his fourth Manny Mania contest, hosted by Red Bull in New York City, in August 2012.

== Company owner ==
Brezinski has collaborated with fellow professional skateboarder, Paul Rodriguez, to form the bearing company, Andale. Brezinski has revealed that the name initially emerged following a conversation between Brezinski and another professional skateboarder, Chico Brenes, and the brand concept was then initiated during a period when both Brezinski and Rodriguez were between bearing sponsors.

== Inspiration ==
Brezinski has stated that his favorite skateboarding video is Transworld Skateboarding's Modus Operandi.
