= Ben Raemers =

British skateboarder (1990–2019)

Personal information
- Nationality: British
- Born: 4 November 1990 Colchester, Essex, England, UK
- Died: 14 May 2019 (aged 28) Hackney, London, England, UK
- Occupation: Professional skateboarder

Ben Raemers (4 November 1990 – 14 May 2019) was a British professional skateboarder. He has been described as one of the greatest British skateboarders.

== Early life ==
Ben Raemers was born on 4 November 1990 in Colchester, Essex, England, United Kingdom. He first started skateboarding at the age of 10 when living in his mother's flat in Walton-on-the-Naze, Essex.

== Life and career ==
Ben rode for various brands throughout his career, including Consolidated Skateboards, Lost Art, Volcom and éS Footwear. He ultimately settled to ride for Enjoi, Slam City Skates, Independent Trucks, and Converse until his death.

Ben moved from Essex to San Jose, California in 2010, ultimately deciding to move back to London permanently around 2015.

Ben was a cast member in King of the Road 2016. He, along with his team members for Enjoi Skateboards, came in first place, with Ben being featured on the cover of the King of The Road issue of Thrasher Magazine, performing an invert on a skatepark bowl whilst barefoot.

== Death ==
Raemers died by suicide on 14 May 2019, at the age of 28.

== Legacy ==
The Ben Raemers Foundation was established in 2019 following Ben's death. The Ben Raemers Foundation is a skateboarding organisation that aims to end the stigma and burden that often clouds issues of mental health by bringing awareness of these issues and suicide to the forefront within the wider skateboarding community.

The Ben Raemers Foundation logo is a vectorised silhouette of Ben’s side profile. This logo can be seen on the ramps of several skateparks, including Croxley Green skatepark.
