= The Skatepark Project =

Skateboarding organization

- Nickname: TSP
- Founded: 2002
- Founder: Tony Hawk
- Type: Nonprofit
- Purpose: Skatepark advocacy
- Location: United States
- Region served: Worldwide
- Website: https://skatepark.org/
- Formerly called: The Tony Hawk Foundation

The Skatepark Project is a nonprofit skateboarding organization that helps communities build public skate parks for youth in underserved communities. Created in 2002 as the Tony Hawk Foundation by skater Tony Hawk, the organization was renamed in 2020 to better reflect its mission. It has built more than 600 skateparks worldwide.
