= John Rattray (skateboarder) =

Scottish skateboarder

John Rattray is a Scottish professional skateboarder.

== Early life ==
Rattray was raised in Aberdeen and attained a university degree from the University of Glasgow.

== Professional skateboarding ==
In 2001, Rattray initially turned professional for the British company Blueprint Skateboards and later signed with American company Zero Skateboards, prior to a relocation to the United States.

During his professional career Rattray has been sponsored by Circa Footwear, the now defunct Savier (with whom he had his first signature model), Osiris shoes, and éS shoes, with whom he had a signature shoe that features the Saltire.

Rattray appeared in the console video games Skate, Skate 2, and Skate 3.

== Other projects ==
Rattray runs a blog entitled "The Predatory Bird" that was launched in late 2010 while he was recovering from a skateboard-related injury. He became Team Manager of the New Balance skate team, New Balance Numeric (NB#), in early 2013. Rattray explained in a March 2013 interview, why he was not a member of the NB# skate team: "I'm old and haggard and need a zimmer frame to move around so..."

== Videography ==
- Zero: Cold War (2013)
- New Balance: The Second Narrows (2013)
- Zero/DGK: Fresh 'til Death (2011)
- éS: South By South East Tour (2011)
- éS: Tri-X Northwest Trip (2011)
- éS: To Europe With Love (2010)
- Zero: Strange World (2009)
- éS: The Great éScape (2009)
- Elwood: Dressin' For Recession East Coast (2009)
- Osiris: The Capital Tour (2009)
- Riding The Long White Cloud (2009)
- Transworld: Skate & Create (2008)
- Osiris: Feed the Need (2007)
- Thrasher - Keg Killer (2006)
- Thrasher - King of the Road 2006 (2006)
- Zero: Promo (2006)
- Thrasher - King of the Road 2005 (2005)
- Zero: New Blood (2005)
- H'MIN BAM (2004)
- Zero: Dying to Live (2002)
- 411VM - Issue 53 (2002)
- Transworld: Videoradio (2001)
- 411VM - Issue 49 (2001)
- Blueprint: First Broadcast (2001)
- 411VM - Best of 411, Volume 7 (2001)
- Blueprint: Waiting for the World (2000)
- Blueprint: Build and Destroy (1999)
- 411VM - Issue 37 (1999)
- Panic/Blueprint: Anthems (1997)
