= Lucas Puig =

French professional skateboarder (born 1987)

Lucas Puig (born January 31, 1987) is a French professional skateboarder. Puig's skateboarding stance is regular and he is a member of the Palace Skateboards team.

== Early life ==
Puig, whose ancestors come from Catalonia, grew up in Toulouse, France and commenced skateboarding during his early adolescence.

== Professional skateboarding ==
=== Cliche ===
Puig was under fourteen years of age when he began skateboarding with Cliché Skateboards.

Puig has been sponsored by Cliche for the majority of his career and was an integral member of the brand's team. The company's brand manager, Al Boglio (a former sponsored skateboarder from Australia), has described Puig in the following manner: "Lucas has been with us since ... yeah, for eleven years now. His skateboarding's unique, and we're just stoked that he's, just, kept by Cliche—he loves what we do. We've been lucky enough to have, you know, to have met Lucas and we're lucky enough to have him on board today, umm, and for a few years to go, for sure, you know, he's fucking on fire!" In January 2013, Puig identified the Cliche videos, Bon Apetit and Freedom Fries, as those videos that contain his most significant video parts.

As a Cliche team member, Puig was the first professional skateboarder to film and release a "Pro Spotlight" video part for Transworld Skateboarding magazine's digital platform.

As of January 2013, Puig, together with the rest of the Cliche team, is filming for the Bon Voyage video, which will be filmed and directed by Boris Proust.

Puig was featured in the inaugural full-length Lakai video, Fully Flared, a video part that Puig described as "the biggest part" in January 2013. Puig was part of the shoe brand's French contingency, named "The French Connection", alongside JB Gillet. In 2008, Puig was featured simultaneously performing skateboarding and soccer tricks in a commercial for his signature shoe model that was released in spring 2009.

Puig filmed a promotional video for the release of his first signature shoe model with the adidas brand that documented both him and his skateboard crew undertaking a road trip throughout parts of Europe. In January 2013, Puig publicly revealed a collaborative adidas signature shoe model with Cliche, in recognition of Cliche's fifteen-year anniversary. Puig explained, "I been to Germany, to the big office, and we start to work on this, and they really ask me what I want, what I like to skate ... and they're, like, super good people, you know? ... I was, like, super stoked, you know? It was pretty much the first sample that they give me ... it's good to skate, lasts long; it's a good skate shoe."

=== Sponsors ===
As of August 2017, Puig is sponsored by Palace, adidas, Wayward wheels, Official Skate Shop, and Helas caps

== Influence ==
Quartersnacks, a skateboard media outlet based in New York City, US, has published the following praise in regard to Puig:

Lucas Puig, who is without a doubt the greatest skater of the Trilogy [skateboarding video] mold working today. (This means that he restricts himself to low impact street spots and still pushes switch mongo. In other words, he is relatable to the common man because he skates on things that we can all skate, except at a significantly higher skill level.)

== Perspectives ==
In January 2013, while touring with the Cliche team, Puig provided a "Guest Talk" interview for Tokyo, Japan's VHS magazine, in which he explained that there "is no point" in trying to be American (including relocating to the US), as Puig believes that he will always be seen as a "European" skateboarder.

== Hélas Caps ==
During his time as a professional skateboarder, Puig started a company entitled Hélas Caps—the brand is primarily a cap brand, but also sells beanies and sweaters, as is displayed on the "Products" section of the Hélas website in January 2013. Puig revealed in January 2013 that he started the company in 2011 with a close friend who he met through skateboarding; Puig also stated the company is "small" and "just for the homies [close friends]".

Puig has also filmed, edited and uploaded video segments that he has produced specifically for the brand, including a four-minute solo part. A video segment published on January 10, 2013, featured Puig skateboarding with his friends at a "do-it-yourself" ("DIY") skate location in France; an earlier video piece that Puig produced for adidas, Puig's shoe sponsor, depicted the construction of the space, once again involving Puig and his friends. The company has a Vimeo channel, but, as of January 2013, only one video, "Timi Mc Meel for Helas Caps", has been uploaded.

== Video game appearances ==
Puig made his first video game appearance in EA's Skate It, in which he is a playable character. He also appears in EA's Skate 2 and Skate 3, as a playable character, and his participation occurred while he was a representative of the Lakai skateboard shoe brand. Puig had previously expressed his dislike for skateboarding games, claiming that he would "never want to be a part of the Tony Hawk universe", but was persuaded by the experience of playing the first installment in the EA Skate franchise.

== Personal life ==
As of mid-2009, Puig resides in the location of his birth, Toulouse, France. He has revealed that when he is not skateboarding, "I chill. I try and hang out with people who have nothing to do with skateboarding just to talk about something else for a change." Puig is also well known within the skateboarding community for his love of gangster hip hop music from the West coast of the United States (US) (Puig has stated that two of his favorite artists are the now-deceased The Notorious B.I.G., also referred to as "Biggie", and Tupac Shakur)

== Videography ==
- SuGar (magazine): Aspartame
- Lakai: Beware Of The Flare (2002)
- Cliche: Gypsy Tour (2004)
- Cliche: Bon Appetit (2004)
- Cliche: Freedom Fries (2004)
- Chill (magazine): Filming Crazy (2005)
- Cliché: Gypsy Tour 2 (2007)
- Lakai: Fully Flared (2007)
- Cliché: Clé a Live and Unplugged video (2008)
- Fourstar: A Tribe Called Mapquest (2008)
- Lakai: The Final Flare! (2008)
- Cliché: Déja Vu (2008)
- Lakai: Fully Trippin' in Malaga (2008)
- Fourstar: Gang of Fourstar (2009)
- Lakai: 2010 Video Collection (2010)
- Cliché: La Cliché (2010)
- Official (skate shop): Kurd Are My Heroes (2011)
- The Megamix Video (2012)
- A Visual Shit (2012)
- Made In Toulouse (2012)
- Legion of Sorts: something sinister (2014)
- Adidas Skateboarding: Awaydays (2016)
