= Buffalo (footwear) =

Footwear brand

Buffalo Boots GmbH
- Type: GmbH
- Industry: Footwear & Accessories
- Founded: 1979
- Headquarters: Cologne, Germany
- Key people: Michael Conradi - Founder
- Products: Shoes & Accessories
- Website: http://www.buffalo-boots.com

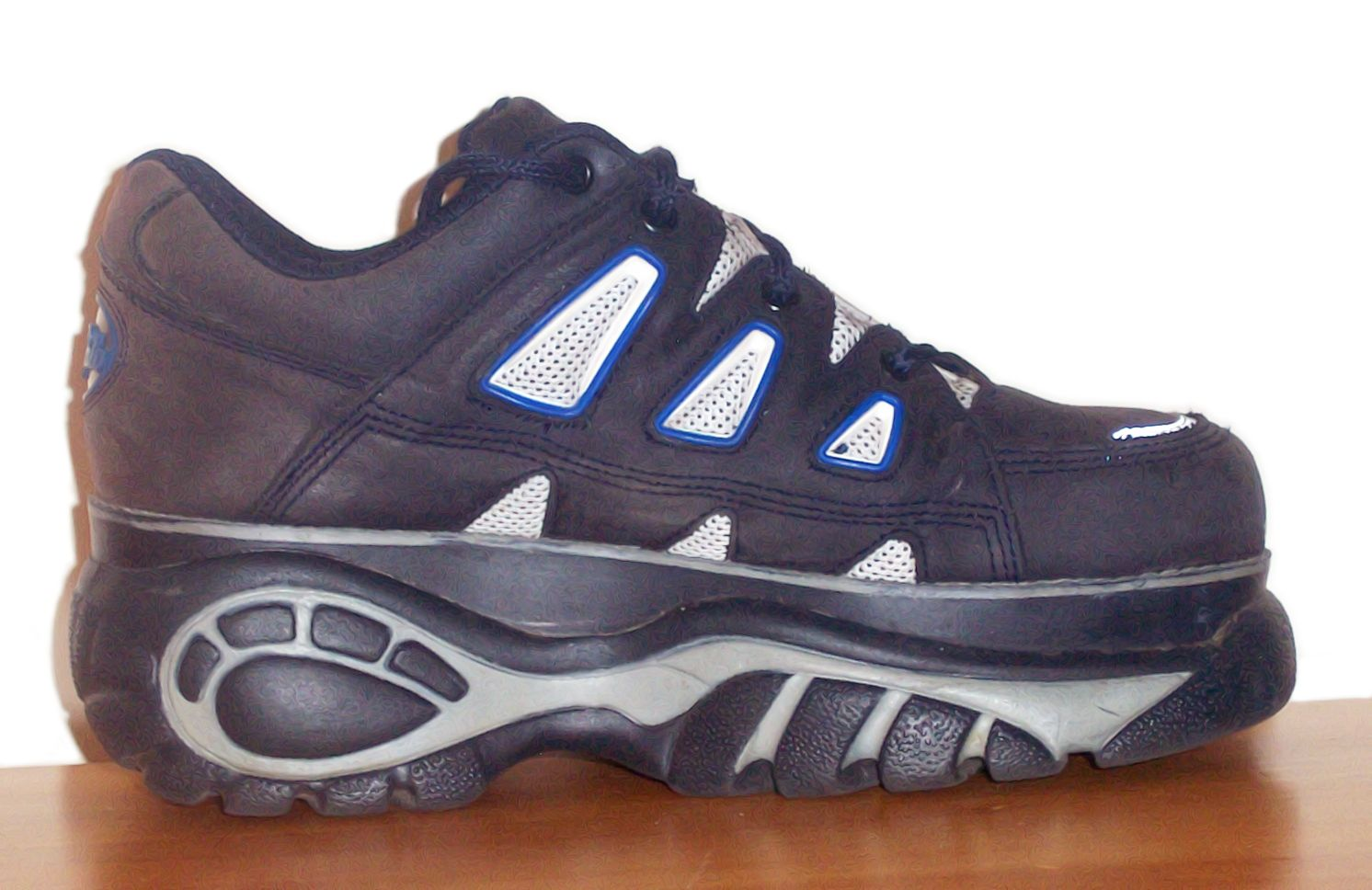
Platform trainer

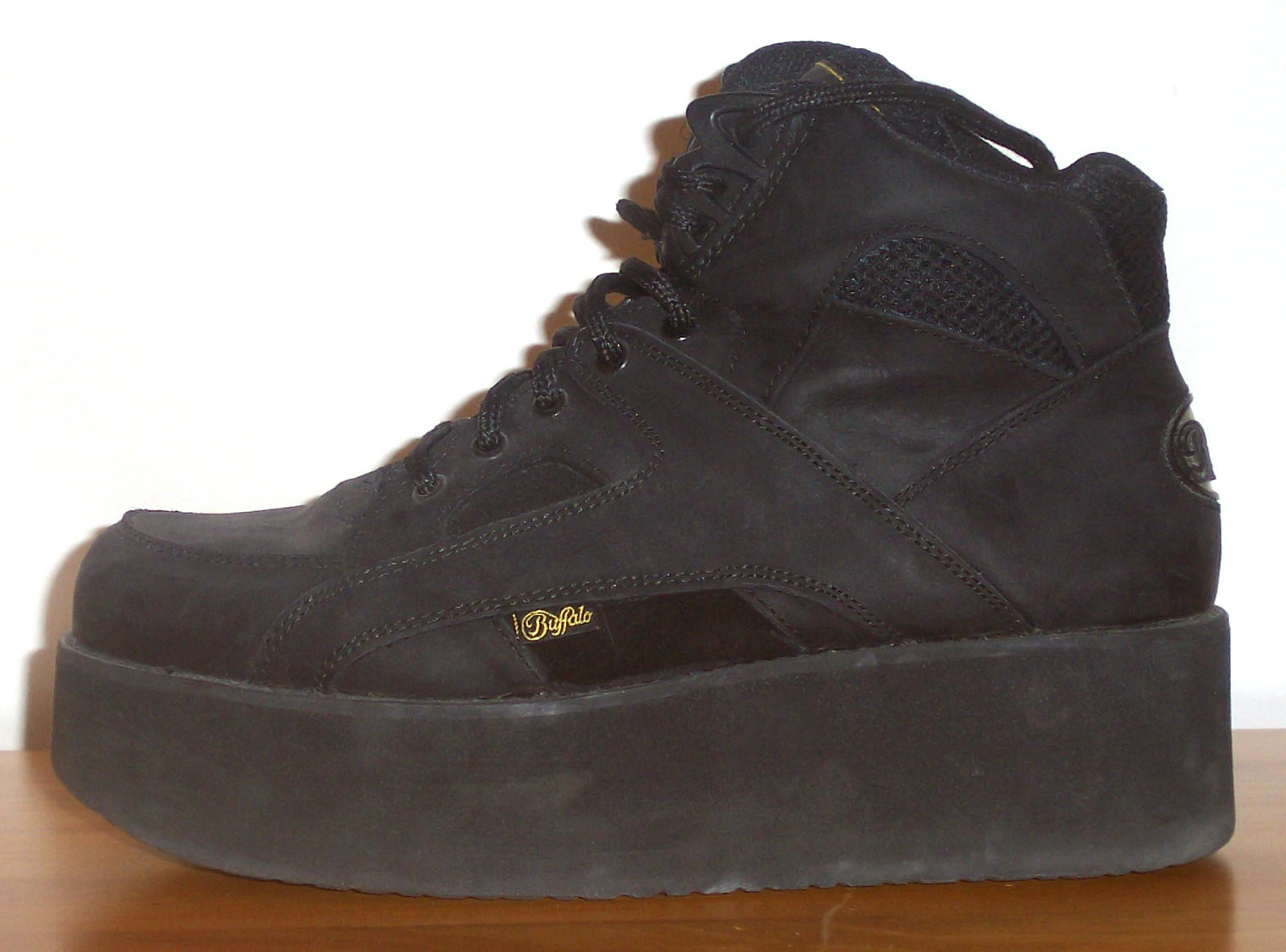
Platform boot

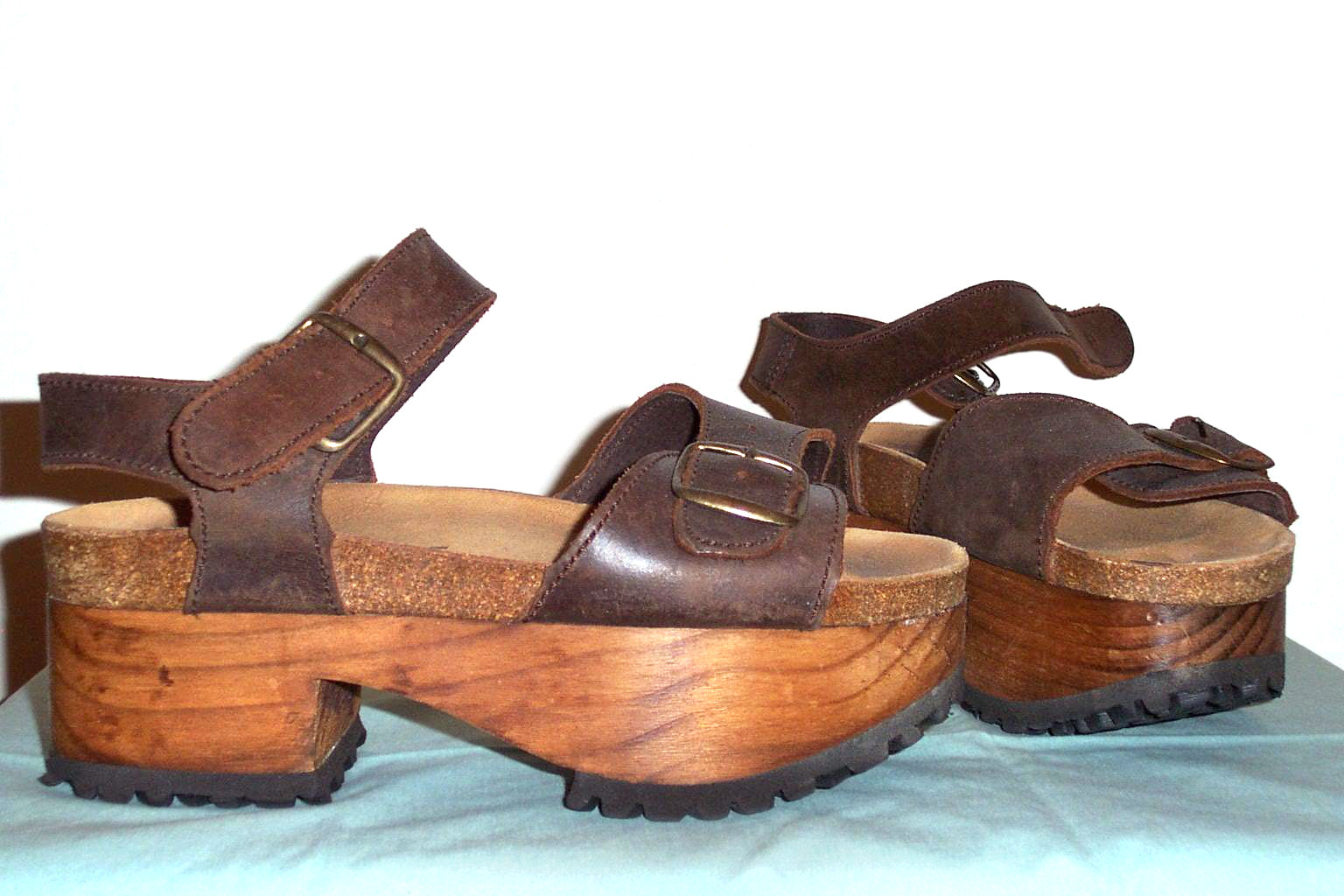
Platform sandals with wooden sole

Buffalo is a brand of clothing and accessories, perhaps best known for its footwear, owned by the Buffalo Boots GmbH. Its headquarters are in Cologne, Germany.

Buffalo's notoriety increased significantly with the popularity, especially in Europe, of its platform shoes from the mid-1990s through the early 2000s. The 10-centimetre platform model 1310-2 was made famous by British girl band the Spice Girls. The 1310-2 also came with a 20-centimetre platform.

Buffalo manufactures women's shoes, men's shoes like dress shoes, western and biker boots, skate shoes, high heels, pumps, sandals, overknee boots, flip-flops, and other footwear, as well as shirts, jackets, trousers, skirts, hosiery, swimsuits, undergarments, and small baggage.

== Revival ==
As part of the 1990s revival in fashion in 2018 - 2022 Buffalo Boots released version 2.0 of some of its iconic 1990s platform shoes. Including the 1348-14 as well as various tower models.
