= Aaron Homoki =

American skateboarder (born 1990)

Personal information
- Nickname: Jaws
- Born: February 2, 1990 (age 36) Phoenix, Arizona, U.S.
- Height: 5 ft 7 in (170 cm)
- Weight: 120 lb (54 kg)

Sport
- Country: United States
- Sport: Skateboarding
- Turned pro: 2011
Medal record
Summer X Games
Representing United States
Bronze medal – third place	2014 Austin	Park

Aaron Homoki (/həˈmoʊki/; born February 2, 1990), also known as Jaws, is an American professional skateboarder and was featured in the True Blue Retrospect video part. He is from Phoenix, Arizona. He is famous for his ability to withstand big drops and to clear large gaps.

He is a four-time winner of Thrasher's King of the Road competition: once as a mystery guest for Alien Workshop, in 2012, and three times for Birdhouse, completing a three-peat in 2013, 2014, and 2015.

He also appeared on the cover of Thrasher magazine's March 2016 issue by landing a melon grab over Lyon 25, a 25-stair, measuring at a height of 14 feet 9 inches and a length of 22 feet, first made famous (though never landed) by Swedish skateboarder Ali Boulala in Lyon, France. He had tried the drop the previous year, tearing his MCL, but he went back and made it with his father and Boulala in attendance as a tribute. The steps have since become iconic and have been used in promotional marketing that Homoki and Boulala participated in. Homoki also listed Boulala's Flip Skateboards Sorry part as his "Classic" (or favorite) part in Thrasher.

Homoki won a bronze medal in the Skateboard Park final at the 2014 X Games in Austin, Texas.

== Video game appearances ==
Homoki is a playable character in the 2015 video game Tony Hawk's Pro Skater 5.

== Videography ==
- Peter Vlad's Wonderful Horrible Life (2007)
- A Happy Medium (2008)
- It's Always Sunnies in Australia (2009)
- Ipath Promo (2009)
- Ipath Search and Enjoy Tour (2011)
- A Happy Medium 2 (2011)
- The Other Ones (2011)
- King of the Road 2012 (2013)
- Bones – New Ground (2013)
- Dekline True Blue (2014)
- Software Hardware v1.0 (2016)
- Saturdays (2017)
- A Happy Medium 4 (2018)
- Beautiful Mutants (2019)
- A Happy Medium 5 (2020)

== Filmography ==
=== Films ===
- Pretending I'm a Superman: The Tony Hawk Video Game Story (documentary, 2020)
- Jackass Forever (2022)
- Jackass 4.5 (2022)

=== Web series ===
- Battle Scars (2019)

== Sponsors ==
Aaron "Jaws" Homoki's current sponsors include; Birdhouse skateboards, Bones wheels, Bronson bearings, FP Insoles and Independent trucks. Past sponsors include; Enjoi Skateboards, Ipath footwear, Dekline Footwear
