= Chris Cole (skateboarder) =

American skateboarder (born 1982)

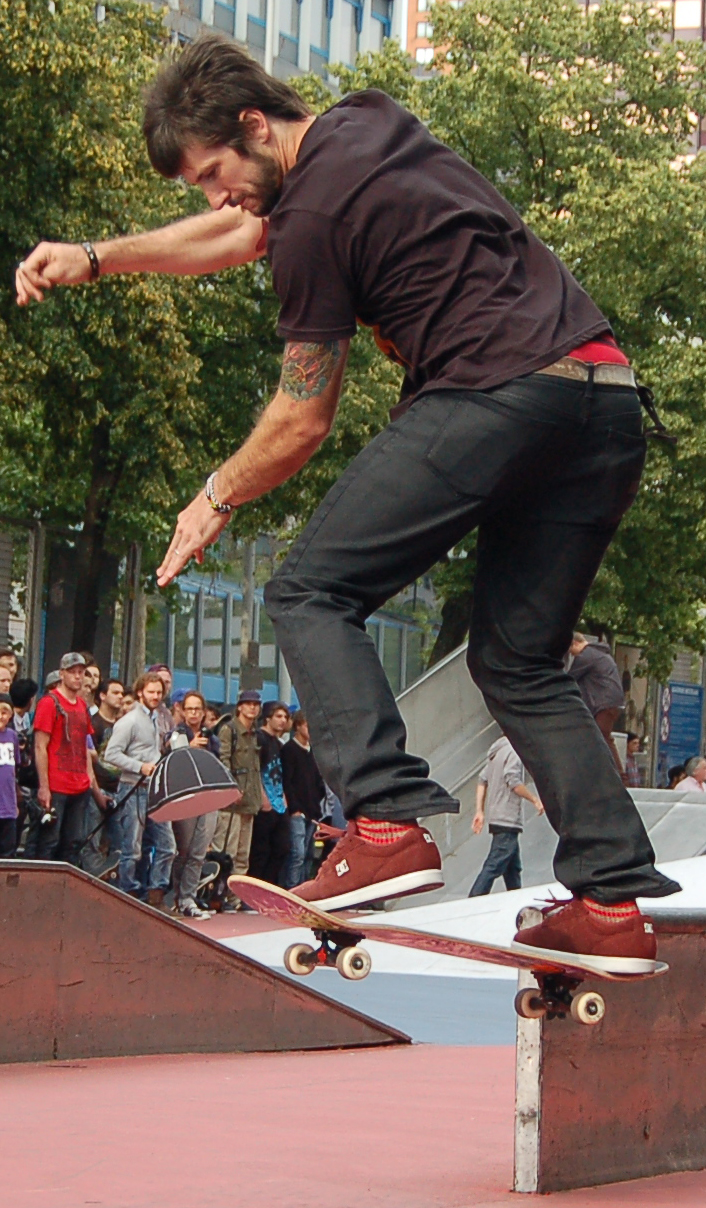
- Cole in 2011

Personal information
- Full name: James Chris Cole
- Nickname: Cobra
- Born: March 10, 1982 (age 44) Statesville, North Carolina, U.S.
- Height: 6 ft 1 in (185 cm)
- Weight: 181 lb (82 kg)

Sport
- Country: United States
- Sport: Skateboarding
- Event: Street skateboarding
Medal record
Men's street skateboarding
Representing the United States
World Championships
Gold medal – first place	2013 Newark	Street
Silver medal – second place	2012 Newark	Street
Bronze medal – third place	2011 Newark	Street
Summer X Games
Gold medal – first place	2006 Los Angeles	Street
Gold medal – first place	2007 Los Angeles	Street
Gold medal – first place	2007 Los Angeles	Street Best Trick
Gold medal – first place	2013 Munich	Street League Skateboarding
Gold medal – first place	2013 New Jersey	Street League Skateboarding
Bronze medal – third place	2005 Los Angeles	Street

James Chris Cole (born March 10, 1982) is an American professional skateboarder.

== Early life ==
Cole was born in Statesville, North Carolina, but moved to the Philadelphia area at a young age. He grew up in Langhorne, Pennsylvania.

== Career ==
Cole gained attention following the completion of a number of difficult tricks: 360 flip, Switch Frontside flip and Backside 360 ollie down the staircase at Wallenberg High School in San Francisco, California. Backside 360 Kickflip down the Carlsbad gap in Carlsbad, California, & Martin Place Amphitheatre in Sydney, Australia. But most notable a Backside flip, Switch Frontside flip and a Backside 360 ollie down the "Love Park" fountain in Philadelphia as seen in his Transworld In Bloom, and Fallen Ride the Sky Video Parts.

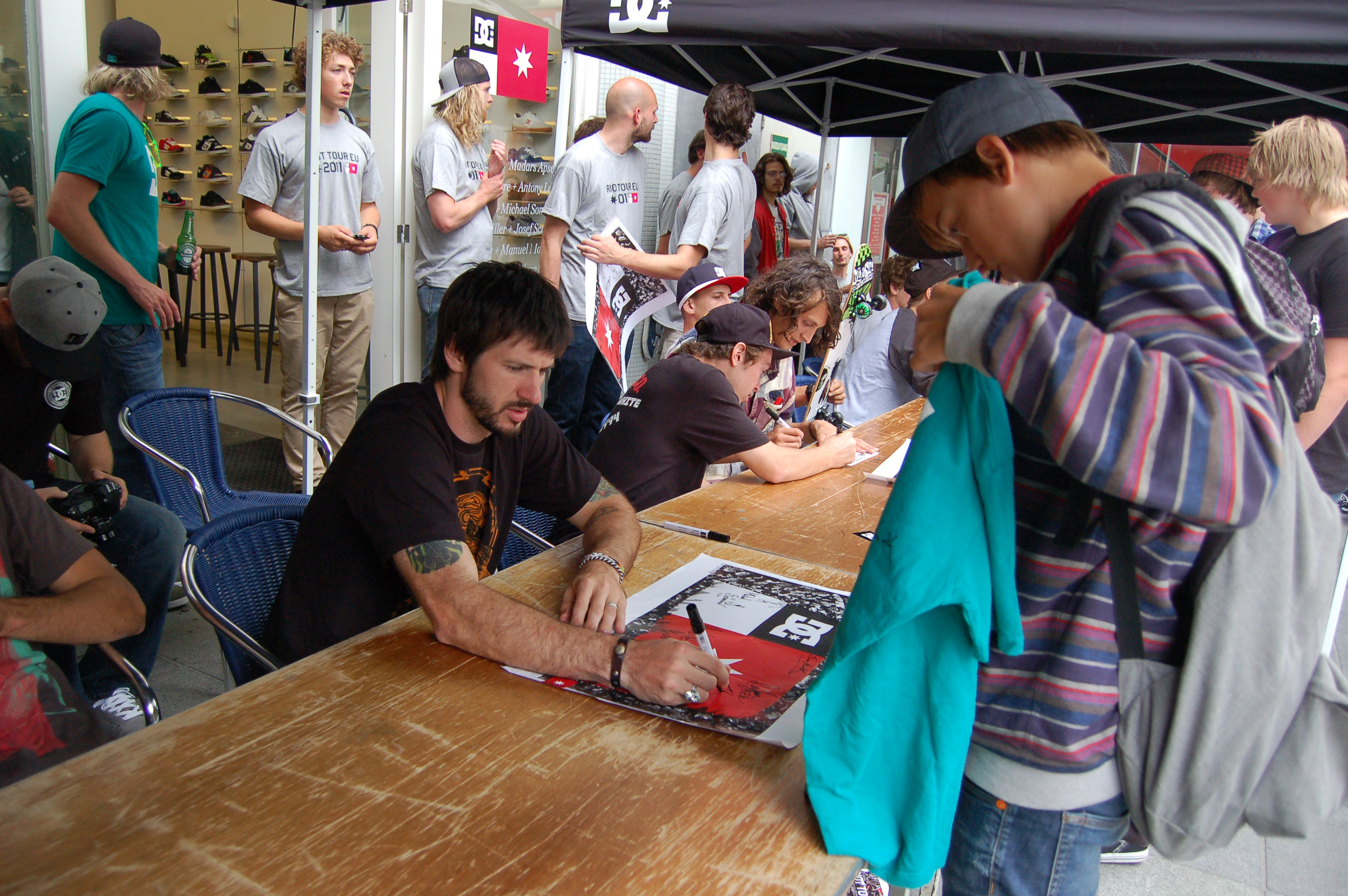
Cole signing autographs during the DC Riot Tour in the Netherlands

Cole was formerly a member of the G-Spot Skate and Snow team, before being sponsored by Enjoi and Zero Skateboards. Reflecting on the early stage of his career, Cole stated in a 2009 Thrasher interview:

I really like Enjoi. The brand is a breath of fresh air. I was on the East and detached from any team member so I was kind of a guy who rode the products, but not on the team. Especially 'cause they are a group of friends. I hung out with Marc Johnson a couple times. He was totally cool. I have always been a huge fan of his, so that was great.

Cole's other past sponsors include World Industries, Axion Footwear, Tensor Trucks, Ezekiel clothing, Speed Demon Bearings, Enjoi, Circa Footwear, eS Footwear, Omit Apparel, but the most significant were Zero Skateboards and Fallen Footwear.

In May 2013, following a bet between Cole and professional skateboarder Mike Mo Capaldi, Cole became a team rider for the Glassy brand—Capaldi and Cole, who are teammates on the DC Shoes team, agreed that Cole would join the Glassy team if he lost to Capaldi in any contest. The pair competed in the Battle at the Berrics 6 contest on May 18, 2013, with Capaldi being the winner; however, as of July 9, 2014, an announcement had not been made regarding the new sponsorship arrangement and Cole does not appear on the brand's "Team" page.

A segment on Tony Hawk's RIDE Channel, published on July 6, 2014, asked Cole—who was riding a blank, black-colored skateboard deck at the time—if he knew of any possibilities for his next skateboard deck sponsor and he indicated that he was not aware of any options at the time. On June 27, 2014, Cole posted an announcement of his departure from Zero on the social media platform Instagram, without a corresponding reason; however, a reply from the Zero Instagram account thanked Cole for his "loyalty & dedication." Prior to the release of a limited edition series of 666 "Chris Cole" skateboard decks—Cole confirmed that the decks were not related to any brand, including a potential one of his own—that he officially parted ways with zero on July 1, 2014, which is displayed on the decks in Roman numerals.

Cole is perceived as an "ambassador" for skateboarding, representative of the generation that he is a member of, and he explained his perspective on the matter in an October 2014 interview:

When I started getting asked to talk about skateboarding in front of people, I found that my love for skateboarding wasn't the same as everybody else's. I have a skate rat mentality, much like the kids that are out there skating, and less like the older, more jaded people that get paid to do it. I love it so dearly, and I feel like the people that get paid to do it and represent it in the public eye, they should really love it too ... I also just wanna live a full life and it not to be all about just tricks at spots ... Who should represent this sport? Someone that dedicated their life to it and loves it.

In May 2015, Chris became a member of Plan B Skateboards.

In September 2020, Cole rejoined Zero Skateboards.

== Company owner ==
Cole was a co-owner of Reign Skate Shop in Fairless Hills, PA, and a former shareholder of the Zero skateboard company. Cole parted ways with Zero on June 27, 2014, after three years as a shareholder and 13 years as a team rider. Cole explained:

I have had so many amazing years on ZERO. I can't explain to anyone how awesome these years have been. With a heavy heart, it is time for ZERO and I to part ways. My decision has absolutely nothing to do with the partnership with Dwindle. I believe that partnership will do great things. Hold tight to see what the future holds … Where we're going, we don't need roads …

In an October 2014 interview, Cole clarified that he was a "silent shareholder" with Zero, meaning that "any of the shares that I [Cole] had were contingent upon the actual sale of Zero. And that never happened and it's not gonna happen ... There was absolutely no payoff and I'm not a shareholder any longer."

Cole was the founder of skateboard clothing company Omit Apparel. Started in 2011 and based out of Irvine, California, Omit Apparel ceased to be an operational company in late 2012 and Cole's sponsorship deal with DC Apparel was announced in April 2013.

Cole is also an avid BMX rider and co-owns Cult, a BMX company that sponsors a team of riders. Team members include Chase Dehart, Dakota Roche, and Chase Hawk.

== Awards and contest appearances ==
Cole was awarded Thrasher Magazine's "Skater of the Year" accolade in both 2005 and 2009 (a feat achieved by only Cole, Tyshawn Jones, Danny Way, and Jamie Foy). He has also received the "Reader's Choice" award from Transworld Skateboarding magazine.

Cole's team, Zero, won Thrasher Magazine's "King of the Road" contest three times consecutively and he won the gold medal at the X Games on two consecutive occasions. Cole has also been victorious in other contests, including Back to the Berg and the DC Copenhagen Pro. In late June 2013, Cole won the gold medal at the Street League Skateboarding contest at the Munich leg of the X Games.

Cole came first place in the second round of Battle at the Berrics, the flatground competition run by The Berrics.

=== Maloof Money Cup ===
Cole was victorious in the first three rounds of the Maloof Money Cup and, in the wake of his winning run, the event owners, the Maloof brothers, offered US$1 million to the first person who wins four Maloof Money Cup titles. As of July 9, 2014, a further announcement on the offer had not been made.

== Video games ==
Cole has appeared in the skateboarding video games Skate, Skate 2, Skate 3, Tony Hawk's Pro Skater HD, Tony Hawk's Pro Skater 5 and Session: Skate Sim .

== Personal life ==
As of January 2016, Cole lives in San Marcos, California.

Cole is currently engaged to comedian Whitney Cummings.
