= Airwalk =

Skate shoe company

- Type: Subsidiary
- Industry: Footwear
- Founded: 1986; 40 years ago in Altoona, Pennsylvania
- Founder: George Yohn; Bill Mann
- Headquarters: Carlsbad, California
- Products: Skate shoes
- Parent: Items International (1986–2004); Collective Licensing International (2004–2007); Collective Brands (2007–2014); Authentic Brands Group (2014–present)
- Website: www.airwalk.com

Airwalk is an American lifestyle brand known for making skateboarding shoes. Originally based in Altoona, Pennsylvania, during its heyday it was cited as one of the world's most influential brands. Originally a subsidiary of Items International, it was later sold to private equity firms.

== History ==
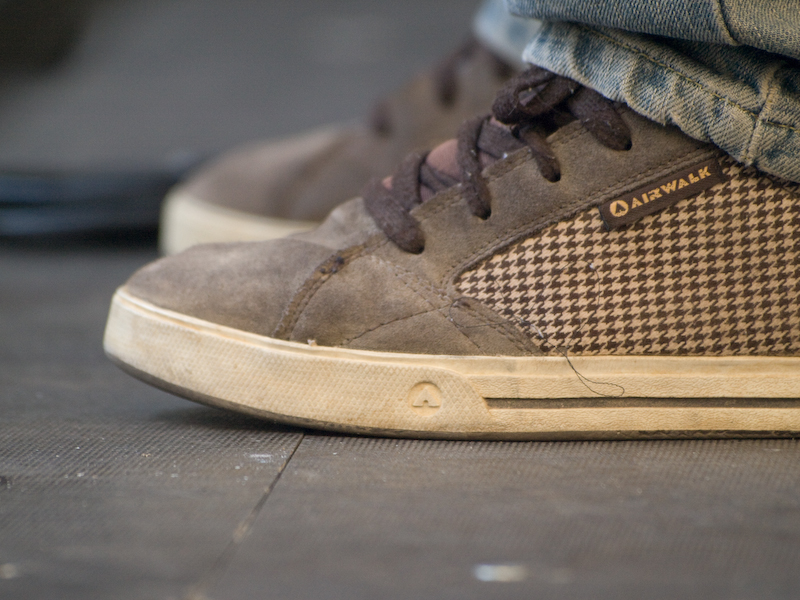
Sneakers in a houndstooth pattern

Airwalk was founded by George Yohn, the founder of shoe manufacturers Blair Co. and Items International, and Bill Mann, a shoe purchaser for Payless Shoes. After making unbranded shoes for department stores in the 1970s, Items International attempted to produce branded athletic shoes in the early 1980s. It designed technical shoes for jazzercise and step aerobics, but was too slow to gain a foothold in those markets. After talking with his son, Mann realized that there was an untapped market for skateboarding shoes, and that skateboarders did not want to wear the same shoes "[their] mom wore to her aerobics class". He learned that skateboarding wore out shoes differently than other sports and designed accordingly. Airwalk launched as a subsidiary of Items International in 1986.

The brand gained widespread popularity for its most popular shoe – "The One" – in the mid-1990s. In his 2000 book The Tipping Point, Malcolm Gladwell cited Airwalk as the sixth most influential brand in the world during its heyday in the mid-1990s. Airwalk was purchased by Collective Licensing International in 2004, which was subsequently purchased by Collective Brands.

Authentic Brands Group purchased assets from Collective Brands, including Airwalk, in 2014.
