= Enjoi =

Skateboard products manufacturer

- Type: Private company
- Traded as: Enjoi
- Industry: Skateboarding
- Founded: 2000
- Founder: Marc Johnson
- Headquarters: Los Angeles, California, U.S.
- Area served: Worldwide
- Key people: Marc Johnson, Rodney Mullen, Matt Eversole, Jerry Hsu, Louie Barletta
- Products: Skateboard decks, hardware, wheels and accessories, and apparel
- Owner: Louie Barletta
- Website: www.enjoico.com

Enjoi is a skateboarding company that specializes in manufacturing skateboard decks. The company is headquartered in Los Angeles, California, and is distributed by Dwindle Distribution. Founded in 2000 by Marc Johnson and Rodney Mullen, the brand is known for its humorous and satirical designs and has adopted a stylized panda as its logo.

== History ==
=== 2000–2003: Formation, Hsu and Barletta ===
The company was founded in 2000 by professional skateboarder Marc Johnson with the support of Rodney Mullen. Both had previously been teammates in the A-Team, a company founded by Mullen and Steve Rocco (Rocco is the founder of World Industries and co-founded Dwindle Distribution with Mullen), which was later described by Johnson as "a completely fabricated team based on marketing." In an online interview with the independent skateboard website, 48 Blocks, Johnson explained the dissolution of the A-Team:

Let's just say that parts of it were weird, but I already had a good friendship with Gershon [Mosley], and of course [Dave] Mayhew from Maple, and Rodney [Mullen] was just awesome in so many different aspects. So the dynamic was fine. I think the problem was the lack of a solid direction, and it seemed to me that A-team ended up being an avenue for some of us to later do projects that felt more natural to us individually. When I called Rodney to quit, it was actually really funny, because we all quit pretty much the same week, but no one told anyone else they were going to quit.

The new company leader proceeded to recruit friends with whom he regularly skated, including former Maple teammates, Jerry Hsu, Louie Barletta, and Dave Mayhew—Mayhew had also ridden for the A-Team (Mayhew's "D3" signature model skate shoe, produced with the Osiris shoe company, is considered the best-selling skate shoe of all time; however, Osiris co-founder/co-owner, Tony Magnusson, denied this claim in a 2012 interview) Other professional skateboarders from this era of the company were Bobby Puleo and Chris Cole, who has won the highly regarded "Skater of the Year" award twice from Thrasher Magazine reflecting on the early stage of his career, Cole stated in a 2009 Thrasher interview:

I really like Enjoi. The brand is a breath of fresh air. I was on the East and detached from any team member so I was kind of a guy who rode the products, but not on the team. Especially ’cause they are a group of friends. I hung out with Marc Johnson a couple times. He was totally cool. I have always been a huge fan of his, so that was great.

Hsu was aged 15 when first met Johnson, who was 19 years old at the time. Hsu explained: "he [Johnson] seemed so much older, than, nineteen. I remember meeting him and thinking he was like twenty-eight, or something; like an older guy, just 'cause of the way he acted." Hsu further explained that Johnson became a mentor figure to him and passed on insight that he had gained from being involved in the skateboarding industry. Regarding his time at the helm of the company, Johnson explained:

I had something to say; every month I had something to say. Whether it was, like, a little weird or dark ... sometimes I would make an ad because I was pissed off that day. I really like what I was doing at Enjoi, almost, almost to a point where it became, like, obsessive. Sitting up and working on, like, a series of board for, like, like, twenty-four hours straight; like, I'm sure a lot of people are, like, "Oh, didn't you own Enjoi?" ... no, no, I didn't own shit. I just, like, worked, and did, I laid out ads, I did some catalogue stuff, and I did board graphics ... I don't know if there's a title for it—"ideas person"? ... I was so fucking busy, that I didn't have time to skate.

=== 2003–2007: Johnson and Mullen's departure, Bag of Suck ===
Johnson eventually left the company to join the Chocolate skateboard company. Johnson later explained that the reason for his departure was that double-checking every brand decision "got really old, really fast." Johnson also describes in a 2010 episode of the online episodic series, Epicly Later'd, produced by Vice Media, the period leading up to his decision to leave Enjoi permanently:

... what am I killing myself for, you know? These guys don't care; they don't care if I fucking take a shit on a board and, and, fucking, put their name on it, and, and, whatever. I'm sure I'll hear some complaints, but ... it just got to the point where "nothing I do matters." And here's the story ... I had just gotten into town, we went filming that night, I got every, I pulled everything out of the car, set up the lights, did the generators and all this. We lit up this ledge. One of the filmers, Matt Eversole, was grumpy 'cause he didn't wanna go filming. there's a bunch of us about to skate and dude takes a fucking piss, on the ledge; it was a painted ledge. He peed all over the fucking ledge. And, I swear to god, this guy, Jesse Erikson, wanted to kill him, right then and there. But I looked at that as a fucking sure sign: "You don't need to fucking be here anymore! They don't give a fuck about anything you do."

Hsu has stated, on his behalf, that he did care when Johnson left and explained, "I knew he was unhappy, because he basically did all of the art direction, and he was being a pro skater, and he also wanted, it was like his little baby, so he was trying to take care of it, you know? And it was too much for him. He just wanted to skate." Hsu further stated that he seriously considered leaving Enjoi after Johnson's departure and that "everyone knew that I wanted to leave". Eversole subsequently decided that he would assume Johnson's role and, according to Hsu, Eversole and Barletta met with Hsu in order to convince Hsu to remain with the company.

Mullen co-founded the Almost skateboard company in 2004 (with fellow professional skateboarder Daewon Song) following his time with Enjoi.

Enjoi released its first full-length video, Bag of Suck, in 2006 and won the Transworld "Skate Video of the Year" award in 2007—Jerry Hsu also won the "Best Video Part" award at the same ceremony.

=== 2008–2013: Tweak the Beef, Hsu's departure ===
English skateboarder Ben Raemers was recruited as an amateur team member in September 2009. An introductory video was included in the "Fall 09" catalog.

On December 17, 2012, an eighteen-minute video, entitled Tweak the Beef, was released by the company in conjunction with Thrasher magazine. A trailer was released on the Thrasher website on December 12, 2012, with the following brief: "The new Enjoi video is shrouded in mystery, and there's rumors of total radness. Even we don't know what we're in for. We've got the exclusive premiere, Monday, December 17." Upon release, the magazine introduced the premiere of the video with the following blurb: "If you ain't having fun, then what the hell are you doing? Enjoi these next 18 minutes. They may be your last..." The video was directed and edited by Enjoi's long-time brand manager, Matt Eversole, and features music from professional skateboarder, Tony Manfre, and American electronic music duo, Glass Candy.

The video featured new amateur riders, Zach Wallin and Ryan Lay, alongside established riders, Ben Raemers, Clark Hassler, Cairo Foster, Caswell Berry, Louie Barletta, Jerry Hsu, Jose Rojo, Nestor Judkins, and Wieger van Wagenengin. Senior team rider, Hsu, is only featured briefly in the video, with his part incorporated into Barletta's section. Leftover footage from Wallin ("Zack's Delicious Doggy Bag"), Barletta ("Louie's Luscious Linguisa"), and Foster were also uploaded onto the Thrasher website.

The origin of the video's title is alluded to in the introduction of the video, in which Berry is filmed performing a transitional trick known as a "Roast Beef Grab". Berry enhances the trick by emphasizing his movement while in the air—referred to as "tweakage" by some sections of the skateboarding community. An off-camera voice during the trick can be heard exclaiming "Beef tweakage!"

In a September 2012 interview for the YouTube channel, RIDE, Hsu and Barletta revealed that the company is due to release another video, as filming was occurring at the time of the interview (for the segment, "The Weekend Buzz", hosted by skateboarding journalists, Erica Yary and Rob Brink).

Following the addition of Jimmy Carlin, a former rider for Jamie Thomas's Mystery brand, on September 3, 2013, Hsu announced his departure from the company. Hsu explained in an interview that was published on October 12, 2013 that his decision was spurred by the departure of longtime brand manager Matt Eversole who, according to Hsu, grew tired of protecting the brand from the profit-driven demands of shareholders. Barletta will take Eversole's place as Enjoi's brand manager and Hsu stated: "Louie understands what Enjoi is all about, so I think they can still make something really great and I wish them the best."

=== 2014–2017: Oververt, New professionals, SOTY nomination, Panda Patrol ===
In May 2014, Carlin stated that he parted ways with Mystery—one of the brands within Jamie Thomas's Black Box Distribution company—without any plan on a future deck sponsor. Carlin explained that he found the work ethic at Black Box too intensive and is pleased that he was able to successfully negotiate a place on the Enjoi team, as he is friends with the other riders.

In a July 2014 interview with Thrasher magazine, Foster explained that Eversole continues to work on the Tiltmode Army website, while Berry is struggling with a period of serious injuries.

Raemers was assigned professional status by the brand in early October 2014. A congratulations video was published by CONS, the skateboarding arm of the Converse shoe company, on October 13, 2014, and features Raemers skateboarding in England.

Following the publication of a trailer for Oververt on the brand's YouTube channel on October 8, 2014, the premiere date and location for Enjoi's third full-length video was announced: October 23, 2014, at Montalban Theater in Los Angeles, U.S. Barletta and Raemers appear on the cover of the December 2014 issue of Thrasher Magazine, corresponding with a feature article on the making of the video. At the end of his Oververt part, Wallin was assigned professional status by Barletta, who surprises him with a "Wallin" skateboard deck at the completion of his trick. The corresponding print advertisement featured the tagline: "help put clothes on zacks back buy his sticking debut pro models!"

A video released on the YouTube channel of Thrasher Magazine revealed that Barletta was one of the contenders for the 2014 Skater Of The Year trophy, alongside Ishod Wair and Bobby Worrest, among others. At the conclusion of the video, Barletta revealed that Australian skateboarder Jack Fardell is newly sponsored by Enjoi.

The latest work from the Enjoi team comes in the form of a video series titled Panda Patrol. From 2017–present, the Enjoi team has uploaded a total of 10 videos to the Thrasher Magazine website, Thrasher Magazine YouTube channel, and Enjoi's own website as well. The videos feature the Enjoi team traveling to different areas such as, Taiwan, Lisbon, and Seoul, and vary on episode focus. Some episodes will focus more on a specific skater and other's will focus on the entire team. The first episode was uploaded in 2017 and the most recent was in 2020; the series has not confirmed an official number of episodes, and as of right now is still being produced.

=== 2019–present: Dwindle Distribution sale, Rider departures ===
In 2019, Globe International Limited, which owned Dwindle Distribution, announced the sale of the company to Highline Industries Corporation, which is part of Bravo Sports (Kryptonics, Sector 9, Vision Streetwear, and Pro-Tec) for $1.5 million.

In 2022, Following a string of team departures (including "Deedz" Galasso, Jackson Pilz, and Zack Wallin), Barletta announced in an Instagram that he was leaving the company after 20+ years. In an interview with Jenkem, he explained how it happened.

"When Marc Johnson started enjoi in 2000 it was all about the team and friendships. The last few months have been horrible. Team riders were not getting paid, and the response was always the same, “We didn’t hit our sales targets this week, this month… etc.” I get it, the economy is tough, but it was just weighing so heavy on my chest, every week how nobody was going to get paid. Every morning I was getting a text from a videographer or artist or one of our team riders, “Lou when are we going to get paid? Have you heard anything about pay yet?” I just couldn’t take it any longer, we were based on fun and friendships, and I felt everyone was just hanging on because they believed in me. I guess I just stopped believing in the company.

Eventually, I sent a text to the enjoi group chat to everybody that I love them all and I just couldn’t do it anymore.

I wrote that Instagram post, pushed send, put my phone down, and I started crying. It was like dude, it’s 23 years of my life. It’s friends and relationships that have come and gone, and you just think about all of these epic times and what being part of it all was like. When I pushed send on Instagram, all of that was done."

Around late 2025-early 2026, Dwindle Distribution became defunct, along with a majority of the brands under its umbrella such as Blind and Almost, alongside enjoi. In February 2026, Barletta's new company, Jacuzzi Unlimited and Sidewalk Distribution, announced their acquisition and subsequent revival of the enjoi brand.

== Criticism ==
The brand was criticized by the Jezebel website in 2004 for a sexist joke written on a clothing label that read: "dirty laundry keeps women busy." They have also been criticized on Amazon and other sites for the Jerry Hsu deck graphic depicting a girl with her arm in a sling and tears in her eyes saying, "I guess he really loves his Enjoi deck more than me." The negative implication being that he beat her because she wanted him to value her over skateboarding.

== Team ==
=== Professional ===
- Zack Wallin
- Clark Hassler
- Thaynan Costa
- Didrik "Deedz" Galasso

=== Amateur ===
- Blue Turner
- Miika Adamov
- Eniz Fazliov
- Ryan Alvero
- Jose "Sixsas" Vivero
- Ryan Connors

=== Former ===
- Jerry Hsu
- Jason Adams
- Chris Cole
- Marc Johnson (deceased)
- Rodney Mullen
- Bobby Puleo
- Jimmy Carlin
- Wieger Van Wageningen
- Jose Rojo
- Ben Raemers (deceased)
- Cairo Foster
- Enzo Cautela
- Jackson Pilz
- Louie Barletta
- Caswell Berry
- Nestor Judkins
- Gus Bus
- Joey Marrone
- Andrea Benitez
- Tony Manfre
- Sean Payne
- Brad Staba
- Dave Mayhew
- Samarria Brevard

== Videography ==
- Bag of Suck (2006)
- Tweak the Beef (2012)
- Oververt (2014)
- Wet Blanket (Unknown)
