= Fallen Footwear =

American skateboarding footwear and apparel brand

Footwear & Apparel

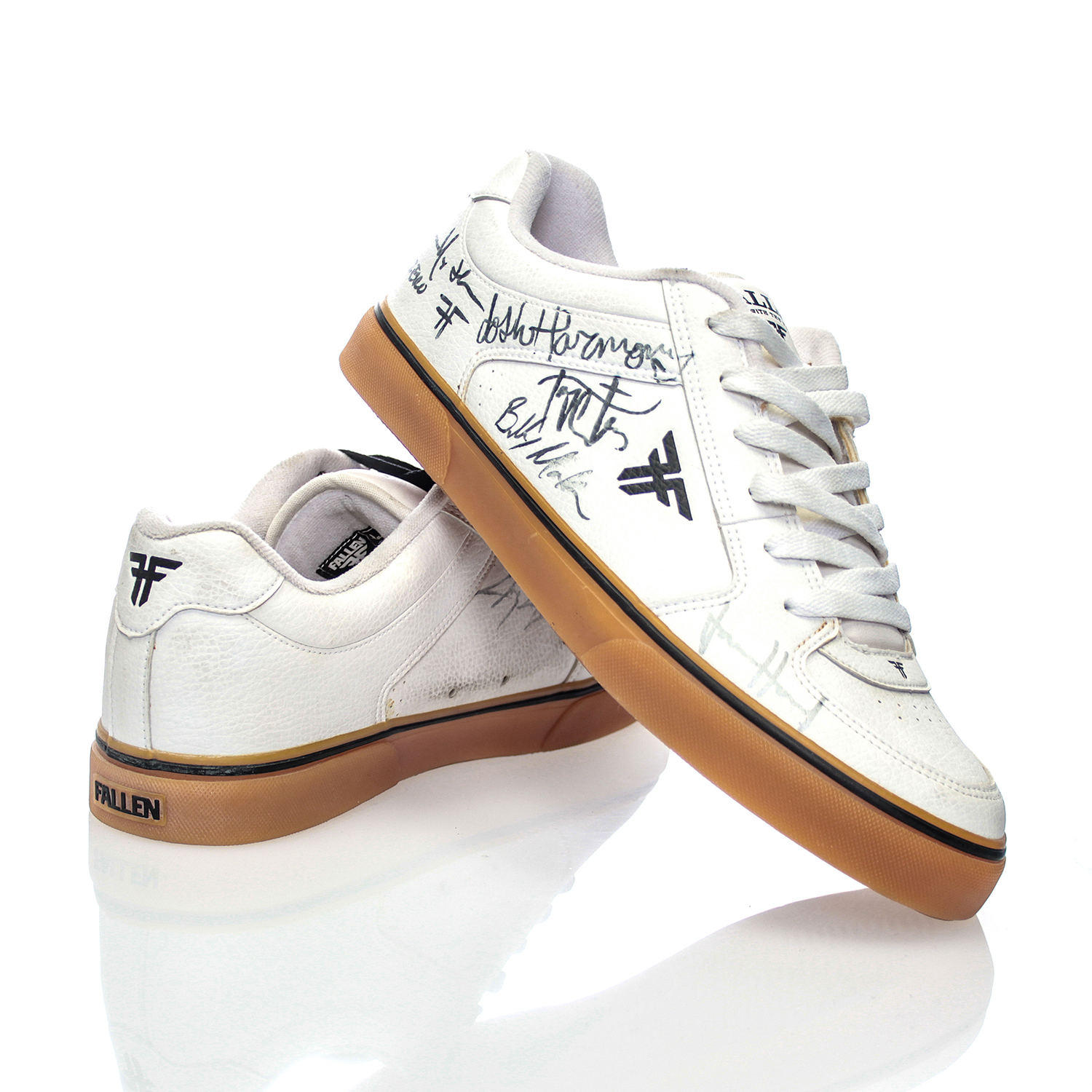
- Fallen shoes signed by Jamie Thomas, Josh Harmony, and Billy Marks
- Industry: Footwear; Skateboarding
- Founded: 2003; 23 years ago
- Founder: Jamie Thomas
- Headquarters: Carlsbad, California
- Products: Shoes; Apparel
- Website: falleninternational.com

Fallen Footwear is an American skateboarding footwear and apparel brand founded by professional skateboarder Jamie Thomas in 2003 after leaving Circa. The company was out of the market for almost two years (2016–2017) and has now been acquired for a global relaunch by Town Connection, an investment group with its headquarters in Buenos Aires, Argentina.

== History ==
In 2003, it was announced that Fallen Footwear would be manufactured and distributed by DC Shoes under licence from Thomas. The agreement was cancelled in 2005 after Quiksilver acquired DC. It was an amicable separation, and DC President Ken Block said that Fallen was "recognized as the top new emerging footwear brand in the skateboard industry." The shoes were sold and distributed through Thomas' Black Box Distribution.

On April 11, 2016, Jamie Thomas announced on Facebook, Instagram and its homepage that Fallen was disbanding operations.

January 1, 2018, was officially dated as the moment of Fallen's worldwide trademark acquisition by Town Connection, which is planning a global re-launch sometime this year.

In February 2019, they relaunched with some of their original skaters, including Chris Cole, Tommy Sandoval, and Billy Marks. They have brought new models and old classics to their new line.

== Products ==
Fallen was known for its shoes, flannel, hoodies, T-shirts, snapbacks, book bags, jeans/shorts, and skateboarding videos. The most popular shoes are "The Clipper," "The Patriot," "The Rival," "Trooper," and the "Forte." At its peak, Fallen had 17 models in over 50 colours.

Since Spring 2016, Fallen no longer created products. In a note on Fallen's website, Jamie Thomas states, "The Fallen mission has always been to work with skateshops and support skateboarding with everything that we do. Unfortunately, this has become increasingly more difficult for skate shoe brands. We are choosing to bow out rather than waver from this mission."

New owners plan to bring to the market the most expected brand classics with some added new styles sometime this year (2018). Apparel will also be available in selected territories.

== Films/videos ==
In 2008, Fallen released a skate video titled "Ride the Sky". The video features Billy Marks, Brian Hansen, Chris Cole, Gilbert Crockett, James Hardy, Jamie Thomas, Josh Harmony, Matt Bennett, Tommy Sandoval, and Tony Cervantes.

Fallen began a documentary, "Roads Less Traveled."

== Team ==
As of January 2015, the Fallen pro riders were Jamie Thomas, Tommy Sandoval, Brian "Slash" Hansen, Dane Burman, Jon Dickson and Tony Cervantes.

In 2011, long-time rider Chris Cole left Fallen to skate for DC Shoes. Cole returned to the relaunched Fallen team in May 2019 alongside OG riders Billy Marks and Tommy Sandoval. Zach Doelling is also on Fallen.
