= Blueprint Skateboards =

Skateboard company

- Industry: Skateboarding
- Website: www.blueprintskateboards.com

Blueprint Skateboards is a skateboard company set up in 1996 by Alvin Singfield and Dan Magee. Originally only available in the UK, worldwide demand grew alongside the company. Its products were distributed for sale in Europe, Asia, the Americas, and Australia. Originally owned by Joe Burlo, Blueprint and its IP was sold to Max Dufour at Pure Distribution LLC in California.

== History ==
Blueprint was run by Alvin Singfield and Dan Magee and owned by Faze-7 Distribution.

Faze-7 began as a skate shop in 1978, in Enfield owned by Joe Burlo. Team Manager Alvin Singfield created Panic Skateboards brand in 1995. Blueprint was formed by him and Dan Magee the following year as a sister brand to Panic.

Blueprint was distributed through Faze 7 Distribution in the UK. Faze-7 also owned MI-7 Distribution, a company based in Huntington Beach, California, which handled U.S. distribution of the Blueprint, Panic, and Octagon wheel brands.

The original sponsored team riders were : Rob Selley, Mark Baines, Flynn Trotman, Dan Magee, Ewan Bowman and Mike De Geus for Blueprint and Colin Kennedy, Paul Shier, Matt Prichard, Jon Weatherall, Pieter Janssen, Louis Slater and John Cattle for Panic.

== Videography ==
=== PNC/Blueprint: A Mixed Media ===
Released 1996.

Available on VHS cassette in the UK only. A joint venture with the now defunct Panic Skateboards. The video is considered an important part of UK skateboarding history and documents some of the earliest footage in existence of some of the UK's most historically important skateboard spots. Spots which include Central Milton Keynes Bus Station and the South Bank Under-croft in Central London. A Mixed Media sold several thousand copies.

=== PNC/Blueprint: Anthems ===
Released 1997.

Anthems sold worldwide in both PAL (European format) and NTSC (United States Format). This release also saw the combining of Blueprint Skateboards with the now defunct Panic Skateboards.

=== Build and Destroy Promo ===
Released 1999.

Promo video included at the end of 'Through the Eyes of Ruby'. This was originally meant to be Blueprint's 411 Industry section.

=== Waiting For The World ===
Released 2000.

Available on VHS cassette only, Waiting For The World defined Blueprint as a team and introduced viewers to their riders and different aspects of the UK.

=== First Broadcast ===
Released 2001.

Available on VHS cassette only, this release further displayed the skills and diversity of the team. This release also featured sections from Unabomber Skateboards and Organic Skateboards (Now Landscape Skateboards) as well as many of the companies friends.

=== The Belong Tour ===
Released 2002.

Available on VHS cassette only. This release covers the UK tour of the entire Blueprint team and is perhaps the least fondly remembered of their productions. The soundtrack includes tracks by Elliott Smith. The highlight of this video are the offcut clips of the team and friends street skating at the end of the tape.

=== Lost and Found ===
Released 2005.

Available in DVD format. The team travelled over Europe over two years in order to film their video parts. Lost And Found was then premiered to nearly 1000 skaters in London on March 12, 2005. The following 2-disc DVD set was released shortly after.

This DVD features the following riders: Danny Brady, Neil Smith, Scott Palmer, Ben Grove, Paul Shier, Vaughan Baker, Michael Wright, Colin Kennedy, Chewy Cannon, Mark Baines and Nick Jensen. Stephan Morgan, Tuukka Korhonen, Ste Thompson and Conhuir Lynn are featured in the credits. Paul Carter, John Fisher and John Rattray have easter egg sections.

=== Make Friends With Marty ===
Released 2010.

Online promotional clip, welcoming US pro rider Marty Murawski to the team and showcasing clips from the rest of the team. This clip acted as a teaser to the next full-length Blueprint DVD release, 'Make Friends With The Colour Blue'. Already-filmed footage of Marty couldn't be used in the forthcoming DVD due to camera compatibility issues, so this was a useful outlet for the footage.

=== Make Friends With The Colour Blue ===
Released 2010.

The film was released on DVD. The inclusion of two United States riders, Marty Murawski and Kevin Coakley, introduced the brand to a broader American audience. The resulting DVD, Make Friends With The Colour Blue (commonly abbreviated as MFWTCB), features an international line-up of team riders and is regarded as one of Blueprint’s most polished productions.
