= Darrell Stanton =

American skateboarder

Darrell Stanton is a goofy-footed professional skateboarder from Houston, Texas.

== Skateboarding career ==
Stanton one of the few skateboarders in the history of skateboarding to have both a Thrasher and Slap cover in the same calendar year. Additionally, Stanton graced the cover of the Transworld Skateboarding video "Free Your Mind." The covers all coincidentally occurred during Stanton's first year as a professional skateboarder.
