= Jamie Thomas =

American skateboarder (born 1974)

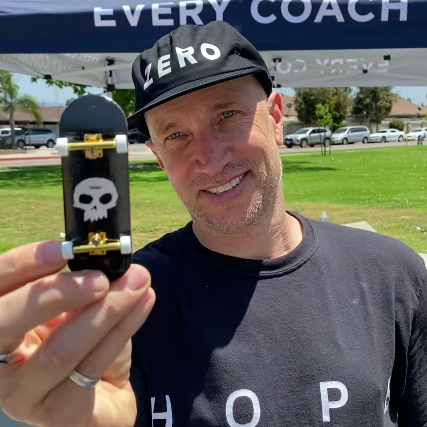
- Thomas with a fingerboard in 2023

Personal information
- Nickname: "The Chief"
- Born: October 11, 1974 (age 51) Florida, U.S.
- Occupations: Skateboarder, entrepreneur
- Years active: 1991–present
- Spouse: Joanne
- Children: 3
- Website: jamiethomasofficial.com

Sport
- Country: United States
- Sport: Skateboarding
- Turned pro: 1995

Summer X Games medal record

Representing United States
Gold medal – first place	1995 Newport	Street Best Trick

Jamie Thomas (born October 11, 1974) is an American professional skateboarder and entrepreneur. He is the owner and founder of Zero Skateboards. Thomas' nickname in the skateboard industry is "The Chief".

== Early life ==
Thomas was born in Florida. He grew up in Dothan, Alabama, but also spent time as a child in Atlanta, Georgia, and Palm Beach Gardens, Florida, for his father's work as a nuclear engineer. Thomas started skateboarding in Palm Beach Gardens at the age of eleven.

== Skateboarding career ==
In 1991, Thomas won a skateboarding competition in Panama City, Florida.

In 1992, Thomas left Alabama and relocated to San Francisco, California, in order to pursue a career in professional skateboarding. At the time, he was sponsored by Thunder Trucks, Spitfire Wheels, Vans and as a flow rider for Real Skateboards. Thomas turned pro for a short lived brand called Experience. Thomas went on to ride for San Diego–based Invisible Skateboards.

After relocating to Southern California in 1994, Thomas was featured on the cover of TransWorld SKATEboarding magazine and filmed video parts for Spitfire and Invisible. In 1995 Thomas left Invisible to join skateboarder/artist Ed Templeton at Toy Machine Skateboards. Thomas filmed and directed two Toy Machine videos, the second one being Welcome to Hell, one of the most influential skate videos of the 1990s.

=== "Leap of Faith" ===
The Zero video Thrill of It All featured Thomas's attempt at what would be coined "The Leap of Faith" (an "ollie melon" over a handrail and down an 14-foot, 3-inch drop). The location of the "leap" was Point Loma High School in San Diego. Although Thomas did not successfully land the trick, his attempt garnered notoriety.

=== Sponsors ===
Thomas is sponsored by Zero skateboards, STRAYE footwear, Thunder trucks, Spitfire wheels, Bones Swiss, Mob Grip, olloclip, Active Ride Shop, and Official headwear.

== Business career ==
In 1996, Thomas started Zero Skateboards through skateboard distributor Tum Yeto. In 2003, Thomas started the skate footwear brand Fallen Footwear. In 2006, Thomas won a regional "Entrepreneur of the Year" award from business leaders Ernst & Young.

In a June 2014 interview with the Jenkem online publication, Thomas explained that the Dwindle Distribution skateboard company—responsible for the Enjoi, Blind Skateboards, Almost Skateboards, Darkstar and Cliché Skateboards brands—will take over "the sales, finance, production and distribution aspects" of the Zero brand, without citing a time frame. Thomas further explained that the Zero employees will remain independent and will focus on "the team, marketing and creative aspects" of the brand. On June 27, 2014, two-time Thrasher magazine Skater of the Year Chris Cole (perhaps the brand's top pro at the time) announced his departure from Zero on the social media platform Instagram, without a corresponding reason; however, a reply from the Zero Instagram account thanked Cole for his "loyalty & dedication".

Thomas explained in a June 24, 2014, interview with the Active brand's online media channel that core skateboard brands will need to remain authentic to survive in the marketplace. He also revealed that he continues to enjoy the process of working in collaboration with sponsors and companies on projects, and recommended skateboarding projects to the audience for motivational benefits.

In 2017, Thomas announced on Instagram that he would be joining a new footwear brand called STRAYE footwear, alongside Chad Muska and Antwuan Dixon.

Thomas announced on April 24, 2019, that he sold his collectible skateboard business, Garage Days Collection, to a collector. Garage Days Collection sued the collector, Florida resident and attorney Matthew R. Wendler, in the San Diego County Superior Court a month later, on May 24, 2019. Two days later, Wendler sued Thomas and Garage Days Collection in the U.S. District Court for the Southern District of Florida. The California case was pending before the Honorable Janis L. Sammartino, and the Florida case was pending before the Honorable Roy K. Altman. The parties amicably resolved the matters in early 2020.

== Personal life ==
Thomas is married to Joanne and they have three children, born in 2003, 2006 and 2008. The Thomas family resides in Encinitas, California. Thomas is a Christian, with several board graphics that feature Christian imagery and scripture.

In January 2000, Thomas appeared with Ed Templeton in a print ad for the Physicians Committee for Responsible Medicine to promote vegetarianism.

Thomas has explained that his nickname, "The Chief", was started by professional skateboarders Elissa Steamer, Erik Ellington and Jim Greco.

In a 2019 interview, Thomas said that he had stopped going to school in the 1970s. However, he wrote on Instagram in 2025 that he dropped out of high school at 17 years old. On May 25, 2025, he announced that he had completed his GED and was planning to take college courses.

== Trivia ==
Blur guitarist Graham Coxon wrote an eponymous song in tribute to Thomas, which can be found on his 2000 solo album, The Golden D.

== Videography ==
- Spitfire Wheels: Spitfire (1993)
- Invisible Skateboards: Invisible (1994)
- Toy Machine: Heavy Metal (1995)
- Etnies: High Five (1995)
- Toy Machine: Welcome to Hell (1996)
- Emerica: Yellow – shared part with Adrian Lopez (1996)
- Zero: Thrill of it All (1997)
- Zero: Misled Youth (1999)
- Landspeed: CKY (1999)
- Transworld: VideoRadio (2001)
- Transworld: Chomp on This (2002)
- Zero: Dying to Live (2002)
- Zero: New Blood (2005)
- Reason to Believe (2005)
- Thrasher: King of the Road (2004)
- Thrasher: King of the Road (2005)
- Thrasher: King of the Road (2006)
- Zero promotional video (2007)
- Fallen: Ride The Sky (2008)
- Bill Maher's Religulous (2008)
- Zero: Strange World (2009)
- Insight: Untitled (2011)
- Zero: Cold War (2013)
- Zero: Damn It All (2019)

== Video games ==
- Tony Hawk's Pro Skater (1999)
- Tony Hawk's Pro Skater 2 (2000)
- Tony Hawk's Pro Skater 3 (2001)
- Tony Hawk's Pro Skater 4 (2002)
- Tony Hawk's Underground (2003)
- Tony Hawk's Pro Skater 1 + 2 (2020)
- Tony Hawk's Pro Skater 3 + 4 (2025)
