= Quiksilver =

Brand of surf-inspired apparel and accessories

- Formerly: Quiksilver, Inc.
- Type: Private
- Industry: Sports equipment
- Founded: 1969; 57 years ago in Torquay, Victoria, Australia
- Founders: Alan Green; John Law
- Fate: U.S. retail licensee Liberated Brands liquidated on 25 April 2025; North-American men’s license reassigned to O5 Apparel and women’s to Velocity Global Brands in February 2025.
- Headquarters: Huntington Beach, California, U.S.
- Area served: Worldwide
- Key people: Dave Tanner (CEO)
- Products: Swimsuits, clothing, footwear, accessories
- Revenue: ▲US$1.81 billion (2013)
- Net income: ▲US$82.3 million (2013)
- Number of employees: 5,700
- Parent: Authentic Brands Group
- Website: quiksilver.com

Quiksilver is a brand of surf-inspired apparel and accessories that was founded in 1969 in Torquay, Victoria, but is now based in Huntington Beach, California. It is one of the world's largest brands of surfwear and boardsport-related equipment. The parent company changed its name in March 2017 from Quiksilver, Inc. to Boardriders, Inc., and is the owner of the brands Quiksilver, Roxy and DC Shoes. In 2018, Boardriders acquired Billabong International Limited, gaining the Billabong, Element, Von Zipper, RVCA and XCEL brands. Authentic Brands Group bought Boardriders and its associated brands and intellectual property in 2023.

Quiksilver manufactures and sells a wide range of products that include sportswear (swimsuits), clothing (T-shirts, polo shirts, flannels, jackets, hoodies, pants, shorts), footwear (sneakers, sandals), and accessories (hats, backpacks, and wallets). The company also produces a line of apparel for young women, under the Roxy brand. Another line of apparel for women is sold under the brand Quiksilver Women.

== History ==
=== Founding and boardshort development ===
Quiksilver was founded by surfers Alan Green and John Law on the coast of Victoria in the surf town of Torquay. Green, who had previously made wetsuits, experimented with boardshorts intended specifically for surfing. The design used a Velcro fly, metal press studs, scalloped legs and a “yoke waist” that sat higher at the back and lower at the front. These functional changes distinguished the shorts from the heavier swim trunks then commonly used by surfers and helped establish a blueprint for the modern boardshort. During the first half of the 1970s, the brand expanded beyond Torquay as its boardshorts were worn and promoted by Australian and visiting international surfers. In 1976, professional surfer Jeff Hakman and Bob McKnight obtained the license to manufacture and distribute Quiksilver in the United States and formed Quiksilver USA in California. The American operation grew during the late 1970s through surf-shop distribution, athlete sponsorship, surf films and magazine photography. During the 1980s, it expanded from boardshorts into a fuller range of sportswear and everyday apparel.

=== International growth ===
Quiksilver Europe was established in 1984 when Harry Hodge, Jeff Hakman, Brigitte Darrigrand and John Winship received the European manufacturing and distribution license. The operation developed in the surf region of southwestern France and was later headquartered in Saint-Jean-de-Luz, south of Biarritz. Quiksilver became publicly traded in 1986. Company filings state that the public offering and acquisition of the United States trademark were followed by broader product offerings and further diversification. Contemporary reporting said the initial offering sold two million shares and raised approximately $18.7 million. Quiksilver introduced Roxy as a women's surfwear line in 1990. The line was suspended during the 1991 surf-industry downturn and revived in 1992, later expanding into swimwear, snow apparel, lifestyle clothing, footwear and accessories. The development of a dedicated women's brand broadened the company's reach in an action-sports market that had largely focused on men. Quiksilver signed Kelly Slater to a full sponsorship agreement in 1990 when he was 18. Slater won his first world surfing title in 1992 and remained with the brand until 2014, winning ten of his eleven world titles during the relationship. During the 1990s, Quiksilver expanded its product lines for men, women and children, increased its international retail and wholesale distribution and developed Boardriders Club stores. Its reach also extended beyond active surfers: a later account reported that by 2008 fewer than one-quarter of customers buying surf products actually surfed. In 2004, Quiksilver's annual sales exceeded $1 billion for the first time, reaching approximately $1.27 billion. That year it acquired skateboarding footwear and apparel company DC Shoes for an initial purchase price of approximately $87.7 million in cash and stock, expanding its position in skateboarding and action-sports footwear.

== Recent corporate history ==
Quiksilver purchased Skis Rossignol for $560 million in 2005, but sold Rossignol on 12 November 2008 for $37.5 million (30 million euros) in cash and a $12.5 million note (10 million euro). Quiksilver owned golf-equipment maker Cleveland Golf until 31 October 2007, when it sold the company to a Japanese sporting-goods company.

In 2009, Moody's included Quiksilver on its Bottom Rung list of companies most likely to default on its debt.

As of 2013, Quiksilver operated 834 stand-alone stores in major cities across Australia, New Zealand, and the Pacific, Europe, North and South America, Asia, and Africa]. At that time, the two types of Quiksilver-operated stores were known as either "Boardriders Club" or "Factory" stores. Their products were also sold in many other outlets across the world, such as PacSun, the Fells Point Surf Company, and the Ron Jon Surf Shop. With PacSun's decline in retail prominence, Quiksilver and other brands suffered diminished sales. In addition, the company operated a number of separate Roxy and Quiksilver Youth stores.

As of 2013, the company suffered a financial slump for six years and initiated a turnaround plan in an attempt to resolve this. In September 2015, the company filed for Chapter 11 bankruptcy.

Co-founder of Quiksilver Bob McKnight stepped down as CEO on 11 January 2013. He then acted as executive chairman, until retiring in October 2014. Andy Mooney, who was formerly chairman of Disney Consumer Products, was CEO from 2013 to 2015.

Mooney stepped down as the CEO and was replaced in March 2015 by longtime employee Pierre Agnes to restructure the brand. In 2015, Agnes was promoted from president to CEO.

Quiksilver emerged from bankruptcy in early 2016, and the company once again became privately held, with Oaktree Capital Management as the majority shareholder. By the end of 2016, their retail presence had significantly diminished after restructuring by Oaktree.

The company's name was changed in March 2017 to Boardriders, Inc., and it is the owner of the Quiksilver, Roxy, and DC Shoes brands. Boardriders purchased Billabong International Limited in 2018.

On 30 January 2018, the global CEO of Boardriders, Pierre Agnes, was declared missing after his powerboat washed ashore without him near Biarritz, France, after he radioed in to delay his return in thick fog conditions. A search operation by air and sea was launched the same day. The search was called off a few days later, as he was declared lost at sea and presumed dead. Dave Tanner, the company's former chief turnaround officer, became CEO on 6 February 2018.

Boardriders, Inc. owns Quiksilver, Roxy, DC Shoes, Billabong, Element, Von Zipper, RVCA, and XCEL.

In April 2023, Authentic Brands Group made a binding offer to acquire Boardriders, Inc. for US$1.25 billion.

On February 2, 2025, Liberated Brands, owner of Quiksilver and Roxy retail stores in the US, filed for Chapter 11 bankruptcy protection, listing assets and liabilities between $100 million and $500 million. The company announced the closure of all remaining Quiksilver and Roxy locations in the US, with liquidation sales beginning a week before the bankruptcy.

May 2026, ROXY began winding down its two decades of business in Taiwan, with final store closures set for the end of summer.

The Liberated bankruptcy did not transfer or terminate ownership of Quiksilver. Authentic Brands Group retained the brand's intellectual property and shifted operations to other licensees. O5 Apparel became the principal North American operator for Quiksilver men's apparel, while Velocity Global Brands took responsibility for the design, manufacture and distribution of Quiksilver women's apparel in the United States and Canada. Groupe Beaumanoir operates Quiksilver and the other former Boardriders brands across key Western European markets, while BR South Pacific operates Quiksilver, Billabong, Roxy and RVCA in Australia, New Zealand, Thailand and Indonesia.

== Products, distribution and sponsored athletes ==
Quiksilver's current product categories include boardshorts, wetsuits, rash guards and other surf apparel; snow jackets and pants; casual shirts, T-shirts, sweatshirts, outerwear, pants and shorts; sandals and other footwear; and accessories including hats, backpacks and wallets. Its Waterman range is oriented toward fishing, boating and other water-based activities. The Quiksilver women's range includes boardshorts, swimwear, dresses, T-shirts, woven tops, outerwear, denim, knitwear, fleece and sweaters. Because the brand operates through regional licensing arrangements, its products and distribution vary by territory. In the United States, Quiksilver is sold through its official e-commerce site and wholesale retailers including Macy's, Tillys, Zumiez and Amazon. Athlete sponsorship has been a central part of Quiksilver's marketing since its early expansion. The brand promoted its first boardshorts through competitive surfers, magazine photography and surf films, and later sponsored professional events including the Quiksilver Pro Gold Coast, Quiksilver Pro France and the Quiksilver in Memory of Eddie Aikau. The 2011 Quiksilver Pro New York was the first world-title tour event held on the East Coast of the United States and offered a then-unprecedented $1 million prize purse. In January 2026, Quiksilver said that its global athlete program included more than 70 riders, with more than 50 surf athletes across six continents and more than 20 snow athletes. Current surf-team members include Griffin Colapinto, Kanoa Igarashi, Kauli Vaast, Marco Mignot, Mikey Wright, Rio Waida and Alan Cleland Jr. The snow team includes Travis Rice, Sammy Carlson, Miles Fallon, Werni Stock, Antti Ollila, Todd Richards and Noah Peterson.

== Roxy ==
In 1990, Quiksilver launched its sister brand for young women, Roxy. The brand was shuttered after the 1991 surf industry crash, but revived by Bob McKnight and Danny Kwock in 1992, signing Lisa Andersen in 1993. It was differentiated from the main Quiksilver line "for fear it would damage the men's brand", according to Randy Hild, the company's senior vice president of marketing. Roxy was chosen because it sounded like a punk band or club (likely Roxy Music and The Roxy respectively), and is also the name of the daughters of both CEO Bob McKnight and founder Alan Green. About 30% of Quiksilver's sales come from the Roxy line.

Since inception, Roxy has grown to be the largest action sport fashion apparel company for young women. In addition to apparel, it now also produces accessories, homewares, hard goods (snow and surf), wetsuits, footwear, and books. It has sub-brands for its children's ranges, Roxy Girl and Teenie Wahine.

In the spring of 2013, the "DVF loves Roxy" collection was released as a one-time limited-edition collaboration line of swim and beach wear as well as accessories.

The launch of Roxy addressed a women's market that was comparatively underserved by the surf industry. Its growth from swimwear into snow, lifestyle apparel, footwear and accessories made women's action-sports products a larger part of Quiksilver's overall business and athlete marketing.

== Brand image ==
The Quiksilver brand's logo, designed in 1973 by founders Alan Green and John Law, was inspired by Japanese painter Hokusai's woodcut, The Great Wave off Kanagawa. It depicts a large wave with a mountain on a red background. Roxy's heart-shaped logo was created by putting two Quiksilver icons together and rotating both copies at a 45-degree angle.

Often called the “Mountain and Wave,” the design became closely associated with Quiksilver's identity across both surf and snow products and one of the surf industry's most widely recognized brand marks.

== Sustainability and industry recognition ==
In 2020, Unifi named Quiksilver among the recipients of its REPREVE Champions of Sustainability awards and reported that the brand had reached the milestone of transforming the equivalent of 250 million recycled plastic bottles through its use of REPREVE performance fiber. At the 2013 Surf Industry Manufacturers Association Image Awards ceremony, which recognized work from 2012, Quiksilver Girls was named Women's Apparel Brand of the Year. Roxy's “Let the Sea Set You Free” campaign was named Women's Marketing Campaign of the Year at the same ceremony. The Original Scallop Collection, Quiksilver Waterman Collection, Quiksilver's “#5STEPH” campaign, Neo Goo Boot and Cypher Fuseflex wetsuit were also nominated in their respective categories.

== Controversy ==
In 2023, a news article from Beach Grit reported that Quiksilver directly copied a design from a small company, Ola Canvas, and their Blackball boardshorts. Quiksilver posted the design on their Instagram account on February 14, 2023, and Ola Canvas posted a response five days later.

== See also ==
- Quiksilver Pro Gold Coast
- Quiksilver Pro France
- Roxy Pro France
- Quiksilver Big Wave Invitational
