= IPath Footwear =

iPath Footwear is a skateboard shoe and apparel company founded in 1999.

== Company History ==
Founded in 1999 in San Francisco by Brian Krauss and Matt Field, iPath Footwear manufactured simple designs at a time of highly technical skate shoes. The company was founded on principles of high performance and low environmental impact. Additionally, iPath was the first skate shoe company to introduce the Hemp material to the skate shoe market. The company formerly known as IPATH LLC, changed its name to IPATH Footwear, Inc. in April 2007 when it was acquired by The Timberland Company.

The company is currently based in Encinitas, California.

=== Slogan ===
The skateboarding iPath shoe slogan is Follow Your Path.

=== Skaters ===
The following skaters were sponsored by the brand, making up the iPath skate team: Aaron "Jaws" Homoki, Adam Alfaro, Adelmo Jr., Bob Burnquist, Ben Raybourn, Chitta Raj, Dale Blair, Danny Renuad, Fred Gall, Jack Sabback, Jon Newport, Karl Watson, Kenny Reed, Kris Barkley, Levi Woodal, Matt Field, Matt Pailes, Matt Rodriguez, Nate Jones, Nilton Neves, Quim Cardona, Richie Jackson, Tony Cox, and Wesley Swindell.

In 2013, due to cutbacks at the brand, the Ipath team was disbanded.

=== Skate Videos ===
- IPATH - Search and Enjoy Tour - (2011)
- IPATH - Promo - (2009)
- IPATH - Preview: Summer - (2005)
