= Cliché Skateboards =

Skateboard company based in Lyon, France

Cliché
- Company type: Private company
- Traded as: Cliché
- Industry: Skateboarding
- Founded: 1997
- Founder: Jeremie Daclin
- Defunct: November 2016
- Headquarters: Lyon, France
- Area served: Worldwide
- Key people: Jeremie Daclin; Al Boglio
- Products: Hard goods, apparel and accessories
- Owner: Dwindle Distribution
- Parent: Globe International
- Website: www.clicheskate.com

Cliché Skateboards was a skateboard company based in Lyon, France, and distributed by the American company Dwindle Distribution. The company was established in 1997 by French professional skateboarder Jeremie Daclin. In 2001, Cliché was purchased by the France-based Salomon Group which in 2005 became a part of Amer Sports. In 2009, US-based Dwindle Distribution purchased the company from the Salomon Group. In November 2016, Dwindle announced that they would be discontinuing the brand.

== History ==
The company was established in 1997 by French professional skateboarder Jeremie Daclin and initially found a niche sponsoring European professional skateboarders. Already a well known local skater in Lyon, Daclin decided to produce equipment to suit the styles of his friends and fellow Lyonnais. Daclin explained in 2012 that he had been travelling a lot as a professional skateboarder and, after filming a video with the American company New Deal, he moved to the Deathbox team (now Flip Skateboards) to be involved with a brand that was more local. However, Deathbox then relocated to the US and Daclin declined the invitation to join the move, stating that he would try to develop his own brand in France. Daclin's vision for Cliché was based on three elements: photography, Europe and all types of skateboarding.

Former Australian professional skateboarder Al Boglio was recruited by Daclin as a "right-hand man" after the brand achieved initial success. Eric Frenay was recruited by Daclin as the brand's Creative Director and Frenay explained his history with Daclin in a 2012 interview: "Being in Lyon, I knew Jeremie [Daclin] for a long time and he was kind of, we called him "The Master" at the time because he was so good, you know, the European Championship and everything. Then he opened up All Access [skateboard shop] ... when he launched Cliché it was like a big, big bet."

The first Cliché video Europa was released in 2000 and featured Spanish skateboarder Javier Mendizabel and French skateboarders JJ Rousseau, Vincent Bressol, Ricardo Fonseca and Nicolas Caron. French professional skateboarder Lucas Puig, who was unable to speak English during his early years with the company, then joined the team through Rousseau. Puig was 14 years of age when he first joined the team on a tour—Daclin started sending him skateboard decks after the tour and later officially recruited Puig. Cliché was purchased by the France-based Salomon Group in 2001.

Cale Nuske was the company's first Australian skateboarder and he joined the team after the release of the Europa video. Nuske's initial video footage formed the opening part in the 2003 Bon Appetit video and he was named by SLAM magazine as the 2004 Australian "Skater of the Year". Another Australian, Andrew Brophy, was later sponsored by the company in 2005, when he was 19 years of age, and he also won the SLAM award in 2009. Brophy explained in October 2013 that his early period with the brand was affected by his partying lifestyle in London, UK, but he attained greater focus after a conversation with Boglio. Also in 2005, the company's first-ever American team member, Joey Brezinski, began his relationship with Cliché.

Salomon Group became part of Amer Sports International in 2005. In 2009, US-based Dwindle Distribution purchased the company from the Salomon Group, with Cliché representatives acknowledging that the brand had been a difficult fit with the snow boarding-focused Amer Sports.

In the lead-up period prior to the April 2013 release of the Bon Voyage video, skateboard videographer Manolo published a compilation, entitled "JB Gillet Manolo's Mixtape for Cliché", for Cliché team member JB Gillet. The worldwide premiere of the Bon Voyage video was held in Los Angeles, U.S. and Daniel Espinoza was surprised by the company, as he was informed of his professional status at the event. The French premiere of the video, in Lyon, also consisted of a surprise announcement, as Flo Mirtain received his debut professional skateboard at the event that symbolized his promotion into the company's professional ranks. The video was directed by Boris Proust, and was produced by Daclin, Al Boglio, and Eric Frenay.

Cliché rider Sammy Winter was assigned professional status at the end of October 2013. A video was published on the Internet to announce the promotion and the artwork on Winter's inaugural signature skateboard deck was created by prominent skateboard artist Marc McKee. Thai-German team rider Lem Villemin was assigned professional status in early April 2014 and a Thrasher magazine video part was published on April 4 to coincide with his transition. At the time that Villemin filmed the part, he was unaware that it would be used to launch his professional status.

As of October 2013, Cliché was managed by Daclin and Boglio. In December 2012, the company remained based in Lyon and Mendizabel was the longest serving team member.

On November 24, 2016, Dwindle announced that they would be discontinuing the brand due to "worsening market conditions".

=== Guest boards ===
In February 2011, the French company released a guest board for skateboarding pioneer Mark Gonzales, who had previously lived for a year with Daclin in Lyon, and an accompanying video was also published. The model appeared in the spring 2011 Cliché product catalogue.

Cliché released a Tas Pappas "guest board" in January 2013, with graphics by McKee. The design is set to be representative of Pappas' life and new outlook, with a deity figure reaching down and exalting Pappas from a burning environment in which items such as handcuffs and a syringe are present. Footage of Pappas, skateboarding primarily at the Prahran ramp in Melbourne, Australia, accompanied the release of the product. Morgan Campbell, online content manager for Skateboarding Australia, the country's government-funded peak body, stated:

Tas has truly put the board into orbit with this stupendous video part which contains some of the best vert skating we have seen from anyone in eons. The graphic was done by Mr Marc Mckee, so you can be sure that collectors snap it up all over the globe. So good to see you back in the skies above Prahran Tas. The clip is by Greg Stewart, who happens to be known in the UK as “The Talking Filmer”. Gregsie: we are all delighted to once again hear your mid-air commentary. Just in case you missed it, in 2011 Tas was given the Video Vault treatment for his epic Mad Circle part from almost 20 years ago.

== Team ==
Until its discontinuation, the company had signed a number of professional and amateur skaters to its team. In keeping with its European heritage, the Cliché team was made up of mostly non-US skateboarders:

- Jeremie Daclin
- JB Gillet
- Joey Brezinski
- JJ Rousseau
- Andrew Brophy
- Charles Collet
- Ricardo Fonseca
- Thibaud Fradin
- Vincent Bressol
- Jan Kliwer
- Pete Eldridge
- Daniel Espinoza
- Javier Mendizabal
- Flo Mirtain
- Kyron Davis
- Lucas Puig
- Lem Villemin
- Sammy Winter

Cale Nuske, a professional skateboarder from Adelaide, Australia, is a former member of the Cliché team and appeared in the video productions Bon Appetit, Freedom Fries, Hello JoJo, Gypsy Tour 2, Clé a Live and Unplugged video and Déja Vu. Nuske eventually left the company due to continually problematic injuries, but continues to be sponsored by the Modus and Picture Wheels brands. Ricardo Fonseca is another notable former rider of the company and was last seen in the 2010 promotional video La Cliché; in December 2012, Fonseca was added to the Ipath skate footwear team.

== Publications ==
In 2009, the company released a coffee table book of stories and photos that focuses on European skateboarding and skateboarders, entitled Résumé.

== Videography ==
Many of the company's videos have been created by Fred Mortagne; however, for the video Bon Voyage, Boris Proust was responsible for the video's filming and production. The company informed its subscribers that the release date for the DVD version of Bon Voyage is April 26, 2013 and iTunes would sell the video three days afterwards.
