= Element Skateboards =

American skateboard company

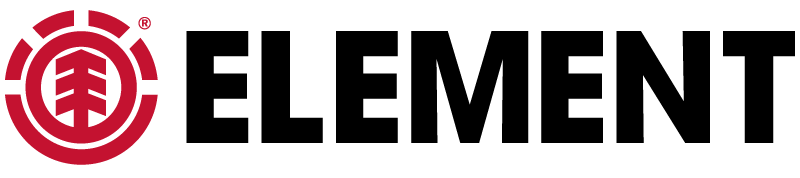
- Type: Subsidiary
- Industry: Retail
- Founded: 1992
- Founders: Johnny Schillereff
- Headquarters: Irvine, California, United States
- Area served: Worldwide
- Products: Skateboards, Trucks, Wheels, Apparel, Hardware,
- Parent: Boardriders, Inc.
- Website: elementbrand.com

Element Skateboards is an American skateboard company, founded in 1992 by Johnny Schillereff, that manufactures skateboard decks, trucks, wheels, griptape, wax, apparel, and footwear. In 2014, Element created and moved to The Branch, a creative space in Costa Mesa, California. In 2018 Element was acquired by Boardriders, Inc. and has headquarters in Huntington Beach, U.S., and Saint-Jean-de-Luz, France.

On February 2, 2025, Liberated Brands, which operated Element retail stores and licensed the brand, filed for Chapter 11 bankruptcy protection, listing assets and liabilities between $100 million and $500 million. The company announced the closure of all Element stores, with liquidation sales beginning a week before the bankruptcy.

== Stores ==
The flagship store is based in Paris, other stores are located in Hossegor, Lyon, Toulouse and Pau (France).

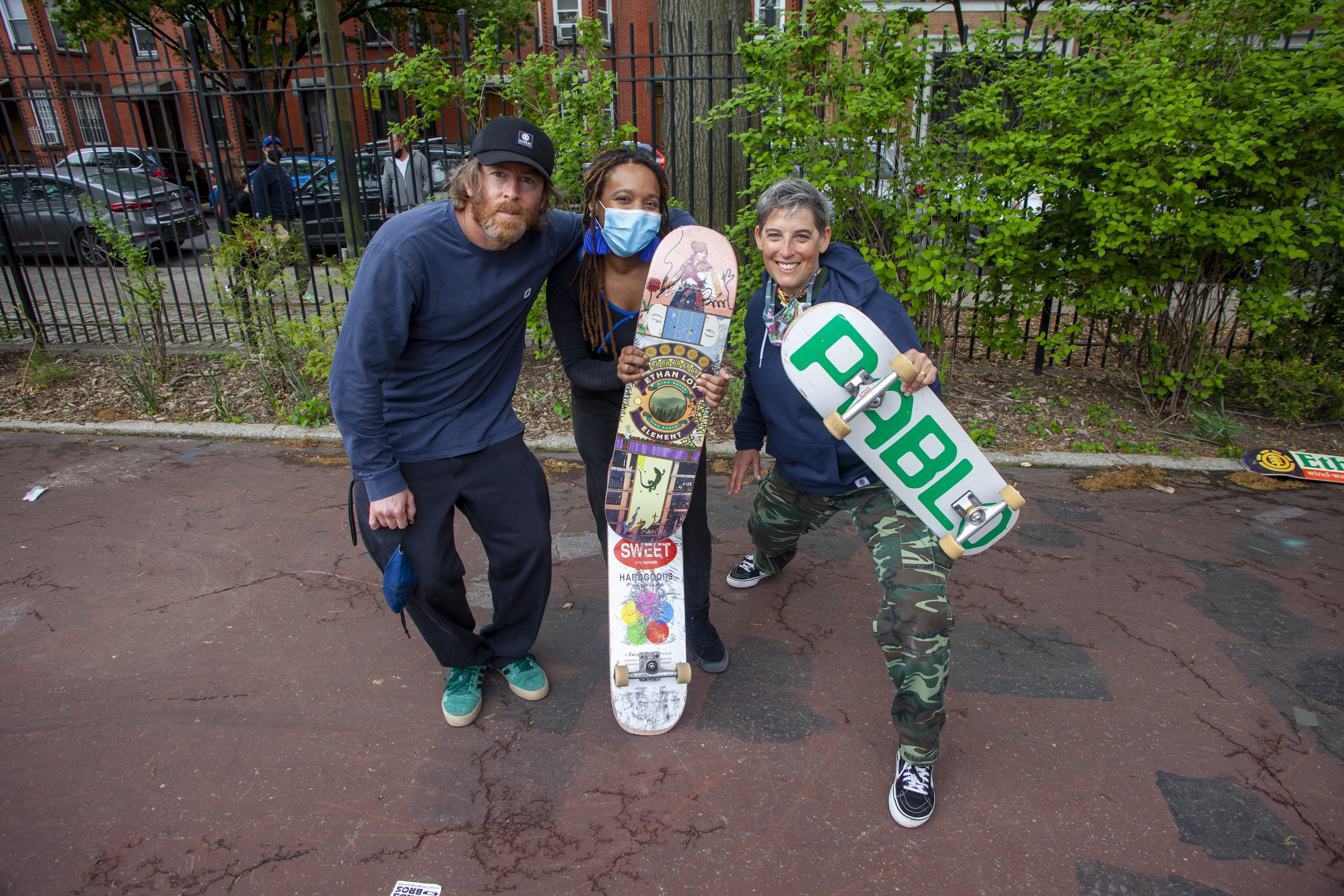
Kava Vasquez holds an Element board she won in a best trick contest, flanked by Donny Barley and Loren Michelle, Pablo Ramirez's mother - 2021

== Team ==
Team as of July 2023:

=== Pros ===
- Brandon Westgate
- Colt Cannon
- Ethan Loy
- Gabriel Fortunato
- Jaakko Ojanen
- Madars Apse
- Mark Appleyard
- Cordell Studley
- Nick Garcia
- Tom Schaar
- Tosh Townend
- Donny Barley
- Vitoria Mendonça
- Bam Margera
- Vincent Milou

=== Ams ===
- Eetu Toropainen
- Funa Nakayama
- Greyson Beal
- Leon Charo-Tite
- Ryo Sejiri
- Victor Cascarigny
- Vinicius Costa
