= Skate shoe =

Type of footwear designed for use in skateboarding

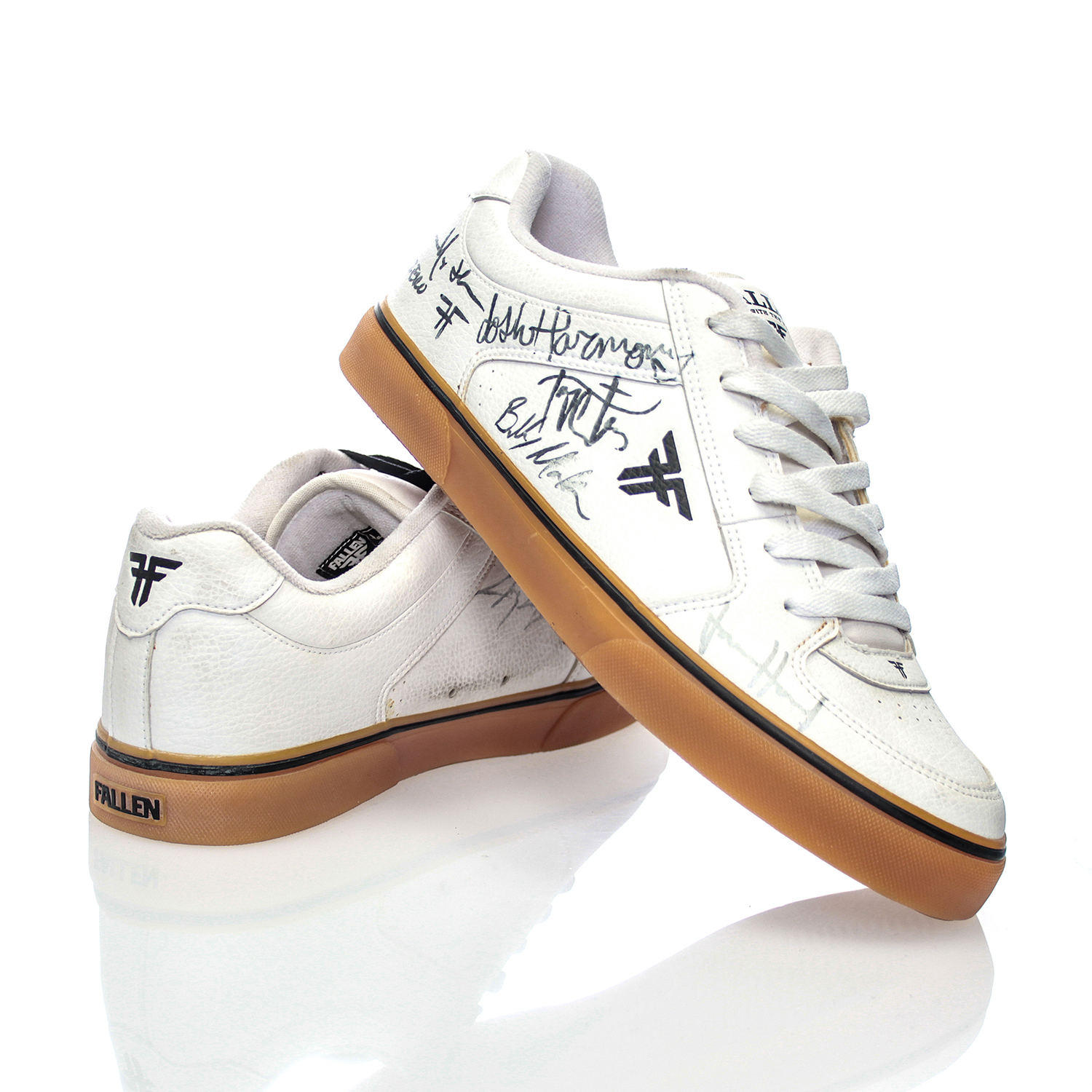
A pair of Fallen skate shoes.

Skate shoes or skateboard shoes are designed specifically for skateboarding, featuring materials and construction that enhance grip and durability. While numerous non-skaters choose to wear skate shoes as they are popular in fashion, the design of the skate shoe includes many features designed especially for use in skateboarding, including a vulcanized rubber or polyurethane sole with minimal tread pattern or no pattern, a composition leather or suede upper, and reinforced stitching to extend the life of the upper material. The most important aspect of skate shoes is that they have flat soles which allow the skater to have better board control.

== History ==
Skateboarding was originally denoted "sidewalk surfing" and early skaters emulated surfing style and performed barefoot. By the mid 1960s, skateboarders wore Keds and Chuck Taylor All-Stars, which had flat rubber soles that provided traction before griptape was common. Plimsoll-style boat shoes manufactured by the Randolph Rubber Company and Vans were developed as the sport became more widespread.

As skateboarding focused on ollies in the 1980s, durability in footwear became more important. High-impact tricks resulted in the increased popularity of higher-cut shoes, and Vans, Vision Street Wear, and Etnies introduced high-cut models by the end of the decade. A popular shoe at the time was the Air Jordan 1, which was affordable and provided grip and protection. In the 1990s, low-top builds dominated the market as tricks became more flip-oriented.

In 1999, Cara-Beth Burnside became the first woman to have a signature skate shoe.

== Features ==
Skate shoes can be split into vulcanized and cupsole models. Vulcanized shoes are flexible and have good board feel, while cupsole shoes offer better protection and support. Shoe innovations include preventing "heel bruises" (damage to the heel area of the foot caused by harsh landings), enhancement of "skateboard feel" through increased flexibility, and increased grip traction allowing for more predictable handling.

Many features of a skate shoe are designed to increase durability. Skate shoes are subjected to the abrasiveness of a skateboard's grip tape regularly; this is why skaters tend to go through shoes quickly. Super suede, action leather, and plastic reinforcing the toe box help to extend the life of a skate shoe. Lace loops and protectors are designed to prevent laces from ripping by shielding the most common areas that come into contact with grip tape. Other common features include reinforced stitching to prevent ripping, and wider shoe width so that there is more contact with the board, with thicker tongues and sides to compensate.

Technical features include:

- Ollie patch (Vision Street Wear, Airwalk – 1980s)
- Duracap (Vans)
- Air pockets in the heels
- Dynamic Grip Technology (DGT – DC Shoes)
- System G2 Cushioning (etnies, Emerica, éS)
- STI foam (etnies, Emerica, éS)
- Silicone Rubber makes shoes last longer (SiRC)
- Stash Pockets under sole or tongue (DVS, Ipath and Supra)
- Shock-Absorbing insoles (Nike SB)
- Kevlar-reinforced laces (Nike SB)
- Lunarlon (Nike SB)

== See also ==
- List of shoe styles
- List of skateboarding shoe brands
