= List of professional skateboarders =

The following is a list of notable professional skateboarders and their sponsors.

Entries with blank cells represent skateboarders who have not yet secured a sponsor in this category.

Skaters	Decks	Trucks	Wheels	Shoes	Clothing	Other
Lyn-Z Adams Hawkins	Birdhouse Skateboards		Type S Wheels	Etnies	Volcom	K-5 Boardshop, Ethika, Kicker
Andy Anderson	Powell Peralta	Mini Logo	Bones	Etnies	Swatch, Skullcandy	Skull Skates, Mind Control Products
Tony Alva	Alva Skates	Ace		Vans		
Jake Anderson	Skate Mental	Thunder	Spitfire	HUF	Former	Five Points Skateshop
Mark Appleyard	Element	Thunder	Bones	Globe	Volcom	CCS
Lizzie Armanto	Birdhouse	Independent	Bones	Vans	Bro Style	187, Action Cam, GShock, Mahfia
Ray Barbee	Element	Independent		Vans	Wesc	
Pedro Barros	Pocket Pistols	Independent	Alta	Vans	Volcom	Bronson Speed Co, Evoke, Frágil Skate, Layback Beer, Oi Skate, Petrobras, Red Bull
Theotis Beasley	Baker	Thunder	Spitfire	Nike SB	Nike Apparel	Mountain Dew, Shake Junt, Bones Bearings, Diamond Supply Co., Stance Socks, Ethika
Chico Brenes	Chocolate	Independent	Autobahn	DVS	LRG	Central Skate Shop
Joey Brezinski	Cliché	Tensor	Autobahn			Red Bull, Val Surf, Diamond, Andale
Jake Brown	Sk8Mafia	Independent	Spitfire		Laced	Monster Energy, Paradox Griptape
Letícia Bufoni	Viva	Venture	Bones	NikeSB	---	Red Bull, Beats By Dre, GoPro, Grizzly Griptape, Boarders for Breast Cancer, Oi Brasil
Steve Caballero	Powell Peralta	Independent	Autobahn	Vans		Pro-tec
Curren Caples	Fucking Awesome	Independent	Ricta	Vans	RVCA	MOB Grip, Momentum Ride Shop, Oakley, Bones Bearings, Monster Energy Drink, Sol Republic, Fin Control Systems
Mike Carroll	Girl	Royal		Lakai	Fourstar	Diamond Supply Co., Glassy Sunhaters
Chris Cole	Zero	Thunder	Spitfire	Fallen		Monster Energy, Grizzly, Reign Skateshop, Stance, Kershaw
Corey Duffel	Foundation	Venture	Pig	Osiris		Mob Grip
Rob Dyrdek	Alien Workshop	Silver		DC	DC Apparel	Monster Energy, IVI Eyewear, Street League Skateboarding (SLS)
Jagger Eaton	The Heart Supply	Independent	Bones			Red Bull, KTR
Erik Ellington	Deathwish	Thunder	Spitfire	Supra	KR3W	Brigada Eyewear, Shake Junt
Jamie Foy	Deathwish	Thunder	Spitfire	New Balance Numeric	Stance	Bones, Bronson Bearings, Red Bull, Shake Junt, Skate Warehouse
Ryan Gallant	Visit	Theeve	Gold	C1rca		MOB Grip
Nick Garcia	Element			Etnies	Stance	Furnace Skateshop
Kerry Getz	Terror of Planet X			DVS	Nocturnal	Mob Griptape
Mark Gonzales	Krooked	Independent		Adidas	Fourstar	
David González	Flip	Independent	Ricta	Globe	Volcom	MOB Grip
Jim Greco	Deathwish	Independent		Supra	Brigada	
Chris Haslam	Brainchild	Independent	Bones	Globe	Sitka	Vestal, Dakine, Bones Bearings, Gypsy Grip, Leftover Hardware
Tony Hawk	Birdhouse	Independent	Bones	Vans	and pads	Nixon, RIDE, Quiksilver & Roxy Initiative, Tony Hawk Foundation, Tony Hawk Series
Riley Hawk	Baker	Independent	Spitfire	Lakai	Asphalt Yacht Club	Quiksilver, Happy Hour Shades
Aaron Homoki	Birdhouse	Indy	Bones	Dekline	Asphalt Yacht Club	Glassy Sunhaters, Nef, Bro Style, Swappow, Footprint Insoles
Yuto Horigome	April	Venture	Spitfire	Nike SB	G-Shock	Andale Bearings
Christian Hosoi	Hosoi Skates	Independent	Penny	Vans	Evoke	Nixon, Pro tec, Diamond Supply Co., McKenna VW, Stance, AWSM, Ollo Clip
Rick Howard	Girl	Independent	---	Lakai	Fourstar	Diamond Supply Co., Glassy Sunhaters
Jerry Hsu	Sci-Fi Fantasy	Royal	Ricta			Bones Bearings, MOB Grip
Nyjah Huston	Disorder	Thunder	Ricta	Nike SB	Nike Apparel	CBD, MOB Grip, Diamond supply co., Monster Energy, Bolds Cracker Sandwiches, Stance Socks
Boo Johnson	DGK	Thunder	Bones	Diamond	Ethika	Grizzly Griptape, Weedmaps
Tyshawn Jones		Thunder		Adidas	New Era, Supreme	Hardies Hardware
Marc Johnson	Business and Company	Thunder	Spitfire	Adidas	Matix	Glassy Sunhaters
Josh Kalis	DGK	Silver	Gold	DC	DC	9Five Eyewear, Bones Bearings, MOB Grip, FTC, Uprise, Premier, Grandeur, Plus reserve
Cory Kennedy	Girl	Royal	Spitfire	Nike SB	RVCA	
Terry Kennedy	Mutilation Co.	Venture	Gold	Fly Society		Shake Junt, Glassy Sunhaters, Active
Tom Knox	Isle	Independent	Sml	New Balance Numeric	Dickies	Lost Art, Jessup
Eric Koston	Skate Mental	Independent	Spitfire	Nike SB	Nike SB	Diamond Supply Co., Jessup, Oakley, Skullcandy, The Berrics
PJ Ladd	Plan B	Venture	Bones	New Balance Numeric	Plan B	Jessup, Brick Harbor, Bones Bearings, Diamond Supply Co.
Bucky Lasek	Green Issue	Independent	Bones	Puma	Billabong	Rockstar Energy Drink
Louie Lopez	Fucking Awesome	Independent	Spitfire	Converse	Volcom	Hardies Hardware, Hardluck Bearings, MOB Grip, Rockstar Energy
Greg Lutzka	Darkstar	Independent	Ricta	Osiris Shoes		FKD, OC Ramps, Rockstar Energy Drink, Kicker, Daphne's California Greek, Ethika
Sean Malto	Girl	Thunder	Spitfire	Nike SB	Fourstar	Escapist, Diamond Supply Co., Oakley, Grizzly Griptape, Skullcandy, Mountain Dew, GoPro, InCase
Guy Mariano	April	---	Spitfire	Nike SB	Nike SB	Grizzly Griptape, Glassy Sunhaters, Diamond Supply Co.
Bam Margera	Element	Destructo	Spitfire			Speed Metal Bearings, Fairman's Skateshop.
Milton Martinez	Creature	Independent	OJ	Converse	Volcom	Bronson, Redbull, Shifty Skateshop
Rick McCrank	Girl	Thunder	Momentum	Vans		Bones Bearings, Nixon, MOB Grip, Anti-Social Skateshop
Lance Mountain	Flip	Independent	Spitfire	Nike SB		
Mike Mo Capaldi	Girl	Royal	Spitfire			Diamond, MOB Grip, Bones Bearings, HEX, Glassy Sunhaters
Chad Muska	Element		Ricta	Supra	KR3W	Mob Grip, Brooklyn Projects
Rodney Mullen	Almost	Tensor	Bones	Globe		
Steve Nesser	The High Five	Independent	Spitfire	IPath	Adeline Apparel	Bones Swiss, Familia Skateshop
Shane O'Neill	April	Thunder Trucks	Spitfire	Nike SB	Fourstar	CCS, Diamond Supply co., Grizzly Griptape, Monster Energy, Glassy Sunhaters, FKD Bearings
Chaz Ortiz	DGK	Silver Trucks	FKD		Ethika	Mountain Dew, Grizzly Grip, JBL, Diamond Supply Co.
Edgard Pereira					Tent Beach	Adrenal
Tom Penny	Flip	Independent		eS		Mob Grip
Torey Pudwill	Thank You	Venture	Select	Diamond Footwear		Bones Bearings, Skatelab, Grizzly Griptape, Red Bull
Lucas Puig	Cliché	Thunder	Autobahn	Adidas	Fourstar	Hélas Caps
Ryan Reyes	Creature		Bones	Ipath	KR3W, Glassy Sunhaters, Hex	Dry Bones Nation, Krocket Kids
Andrew Reynolds	Baker	Independent	Spitfire	New Balance	Altamont Apparel, RVCA	Brigada Eyewear, Shake Junt, Nixon, Stance
Josh Rodriguez	Creature			Osiris	Merge4 Socks, Skeleton Key	187 Killer Pads, SoCal Skateshop, Taco Dudes
Paul Rodriguez	Primitive	Venture		Nike SB		Nixon, Andalé Bearings, Target, Markisa,
Jereme Rogers	Plan B	Silver	---	DVS	Famous Stars and straps	MOB Grip, Bones Swiss Bearings, Boost Mobile, Diamond Supply co.
Geoff Rowley	Free Dome	Independent	Ricta	Vans		MOB Grip
Chris Russell	Creature	Independent	Bones	Vans	Skeleton Key	Bronson Speed Co, ET Surf and Skate, Happy Hour, Layback Beer, Smoker's Choice Papers, Pizzanista, Red Bull, s-One
Bastien Salabanzi	Primitive	Theeve	Type-S			Souljah, BUD Skateshop, Rockstar Energy Drink
Manny Santiago	Fortune	Krux	Bliss		Ecko Unlimited	Flat Fitty, Rockstar Energy Drink, Etcetera Insoles, Grizzly Griptape, Diamond Supply Co., Andale, Ion Cameras, OC Ramps, PSD Underwear, Sk8Hop
Tom Schaar	Element	Independent	Alta	Vans	Blenders Sunglasses	Bones Bearings, Monster, Skatelab
Ryan Sheckler	Plan B	Independent	Plan B	Etnies	Volcom	Red Bull, Oakley, Nixon, CCS, Andale, Ethika, GoPro, Grizzly Griptape
Daewon Song	Thank You	Tensor	Spitfire	Adidas	Matix	Andale, Brick Harbor, MOB Grip, Glassy Sunhaters, Loud Headphones
Elissa Steamer	Baker	Thunder	Spitfire	Nike SB	Gnarhunters	
Grant Taylor	Anti-hero	Independent	Spitfire	Nike SB	Volcom	Modus Bearings, Stratosphere Skateshop
Tony Trujillo	Anti-hero	Independent	Spitfire	Vans		Fourstar, Jessie
Mike Vallely	Streetplant			Servant Footwear	Iron Fist Clothing	
Danny Way	Plan B	Independent	Plan B	DC	---	Nixon, Jessup, ASEC, Megaramp, Pacific Drive, Capix
Brandon Westgate	Element	Venture		New Balance	Dakine	Bones Bearings, MOB Grip
Ishod Wair	Real	Thunder	Spitfire	Nike SB	Fourstar	Exit Skateshop, Stance, Monster Energy Drink, Diamond Supply Co.
Stevie Williams	DGK	Venture	Gold	Adidas	Asphalt Yacht Club	G-Shock, 9Five Eyewear, Grizzly Griptape, Diamond Supply co., Beats by Dre, Bones Bearings, Tango Hotel, StatusLife, Weedmaps
Cole Wilson	Foundation	Independent	Pig		AYC	Bronson Speed co, Home Skateshop
Jeron Wilson	Girl			DVS	Matix, Diamond, Dakine	Val Surf, The Berrics, Filmore
Zion Wright	Real	Thunder	Spitfire	Nike SB	Glassy Sunhaters	Red Bull, SPoT, Bones Bearings, Shake Junt, Kreamy Wax
Brighton Zeuner	Frog	Independent	OJ	Vans		Bronson Speed Co, MOB Grip, Protec, 187 Pads
Rayssa Leal	April Skateboards	Stronger	Bones	Nike SB	8 EyeS	Monster Energy, Mob Grip, Colegio Cebama
Aori Nishimura	Deathwish			Nike SB		Kinoshita Group, Monster Energy, Oakley, Baby G, Shake Junt, Beats by Dre, Murasaki Sports
