= Ali Boulala =

Swedish professional skateboarder

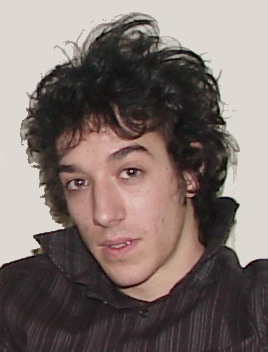
- Boulala before 2007
- Born: 28 January 1979 (age 47); Stockholm, Sweden
- Occupation: Skateboarder

Ali Boulala (born 28 January 1979) is a Swedish professional skateboarder, who has appeared in the Flip Skateboards videos Sorry and Really Sorry, Osiris' Subject to Change, and numerous Baker Skateboards videos.

== Early life ==
Boulala was born on 28 January 1979 in Sabbatsberg Hospital, located in Stockholm, Sweden. His mother is Finnish, and his father is Algerian. He grew up in Bromma before his family moved to Vasastan. He was introduced to skateboarding in 1989 when his family visited Mallorca on vacation.

== Professional skateboarding ==
Boulala was sponsored by Flip Skateboards, Independent Truck Company, and Kr3w. His appearance on Flip Skateboards's 2002 video, Sorry, included a clip which of Boulala attempting the Lyon 25.

== Death of Shane Cross ==
On 7 March 2007, Shane Cross died in a motorcycle crash in Melbourne, Australia — he was a passenger on a motorcycle driven by Boulala, who was seriously injured in the crash. Following a four-month coma that left him unable to skate, Boulala was subsequently charged, found guilty of culpable driving, and spent two years in an Australian prison. A documentary about the crash and Boulala's involvement was released in 2021, The Scars of Ali Boulala.

== Personal life ==
Boulala formed a friendship group called the "Piss Drunx", together with Aaron Pearcy, Jim Greco, Andrew Reynolds, Erik Ellington, and Dustin Dollin. Dollin explained in a 2011 interview that the brand "Shake Junt" is the "new Piss Drunx." The idea of the group was formed around 1997 by Boulala, Punker Matt, and Aaron Pearcy.

Boulala has been sober since 2013 and returned to Sweden, living in Stockholm. In 2022, Boulala said that his primary pastime is music and released several songs with his band, Ghost Boys.
