= Kevin Long (skateboarder) =

American skateboarder (born 1984)

- Born: Kevin Michael Long; August 6, 1984 (age 42)
- Other name: Spanky
- Occupation: Professional skateboarder

Kevin Michael "Spanky" Long (born August 6, 1984) is an American professional skateboarder. Long's skateboarding stance is goofy.

== Early life ==
Long was born in Oak Park, California, United States (U.S.). Long grew up skateboarding in California's Agoura Hills, which is just north of the Valley area and the nickname "Spanky" was created by a friend of Long's older brother. Long was a homeschool student but advised against it in a 2003 interview: "Basically I’d say homeschool is a bad idea for anybody—it’s just one step closer to dropping out. Because you have to teach it to yourself and it’s harder than it is at an actual school."

== Professional skateboarding ==
Long was first sponsored by the Sixteen Skateboards company after being noticed by Neal Mims and Rodney Johnson (team manager) at a "Skate Street" contest in Ventura, California. Alongside professional skateboarders such as Paul Rodriguez, Javier Nunez, Mikey Taylor, and Devine Calloway, Long was then recruited onto Kareem Campbell's City Stars skateboard team. Prior to becoming a professional with Baker, Long explained this period of his life in an interview:

At that point I was still skating, living at home, and going to school. I didn’t really have anyone to skate with, I was just getting flowed from World [Industries]. But thankfully, I started skating with Mike Taylor and Paul Rodriguez. And Mike was on City Stars, so he helped me make a little tape and gave it to Kareem. Then Kareem started hooking me up with boards.

In 2003 Long won the Tampa Am contest in Tampa, Florida, U.S., and received contract offers from both Toy Machine and Baker Skateboards later that year. Long eventually selected Baker because he "felt too comfortable with all the guys" and, in the same year, he attained professional status with Baker, a company that is owned by Long's childhood hero Andrew Reynolds. Long later revealed what it was like for him skateboarding alongside Reynolds: "With Drew [Reynolds], all I have to hear him say is that he wants to do a trick and it’s done. As soon as he wants to do it, it’s almost too easy once he tries it. I can’t believe it."

As of May 2013, Long is sponsored by the Emerica skate shoe brand and, in 2005, Long received his first signature shoe model the "KSL1". Long's second shoe model the "KSL Dos" was released in 2007, and his third shoe the "Spanky" was released in June 2008. In 2011 Long released his fifth Emerica shoe model, named "The Situation", which consists of a minimalist design and a vegan version was also produced. Long appears in Emerica's This is Skateboarding, Kids in Emerica, and Stay Gold videos.

Long appears in the Wavves music video "Post Acid" as a skateboarding alien—the video was directed by skateboard journalist Patrick O'Dell. An interview with former Baker professional Shane Heyl on September 27, 2013 confirmed that Heyl and Long are no longer members of the Baker team as of the date of the interview. Heyl declined to speak on behalf of Long, but explained that he had left the team due to a knee injury, and on friendly terms with Reynolds.

=== Sponsors ===
As of October 2016, Long is sponsored by Baker, Emerica, Spitfire, RVCA, Independent Truck Company, Ashbury, Shake Junt, and Pharmacy Boardshop.

== Awards ==
Long appeared in the Baker skateboard video Baker 3 that was the recipient of the "Best Video" award at the 8th Annual Transworld Skateboarding Awards.

== Music and art ==
Long is the guitarist for the band "The Goat and The Occasional Others" that also features professional skateboarders Shane Heyl and Reynolds, skateboard videographer Beagle Oneism, and skateboard photographer Atiba Jefferson. Examples of the band's song titles are "OOH YOUR WEIRD", "LUH DAT SH!T", and "Billy." Long is also an illustrator and has exhibited in international locations such as Tokyo, Japan.

== Personal life ==
Long's father was a young surfer in suburban Los Angeles, U.S. and his older brother Patrick Long is a professional racing driver. He also has a daughter, who was born in 2020.

In 2011, Long wrote a personal account for Transworld Skateboarding magazine, of a serious burn injury that he had sustained; Long suffered third-degree burns and was required to undergo surgery the day after he presented at a Los Angeles hospital. In the article, Long describes the worst part of the experience:

The very worst part was, after that surgery they had to take all my bandages off in this place called the whirlpool room. That was pure hell because it felt like they were just ripping my skin off. The pain wasn’t like anything I’ve ever felt. It’s so different from anything that I’ve ever felt happen to me on a skateboard. It felt like it was constantly burning, like I was still on fire.

== Videography ==
- 16: I Hate Children (2000)
- Logic: Issue 09 (2001)
- Pharmacy: Chilly (2003)
- Emerica: This Is Skateboarding (2003)
- V7: Teenage Tour (2004)
- ON Video: Winter 2004 (2004)
- Emerica: Kids In Emerica (2004)
- Baker: Baker 3 (2005)
- Emerica: Wild Ride 2007 (2007)
- Transworld: Skate & Create (2008)
- Independent: 30th Anniversary Tour (2008)
- Baker/Deathwish: Baker Has A Deathwish (2008)
- Baker/Deathwish: Baker Has A Deathwish Summer Tour (2009)
- RVCA: Promo (2009)
- Emerica: Stay Gold (2010)
- Altamont: Skate Rock East Cost Tour (2010)
- RVCA: Dick Moves (2010)
- Baker: Bake & Destroy (2012)
- Emerica: Made: Chapter Two (2016)
  - Long's "B-Sides" featured on Thrasher Magazine website in October 2016.
- Baker: Baker 4 (2019)
- Superwolf: Resist the Urge (2021) (online)

== See also ==
- Flip tricks
- List of professional skateboarders
- Erik Ellington
