= Supra (footwear brand) =

American footwear brand

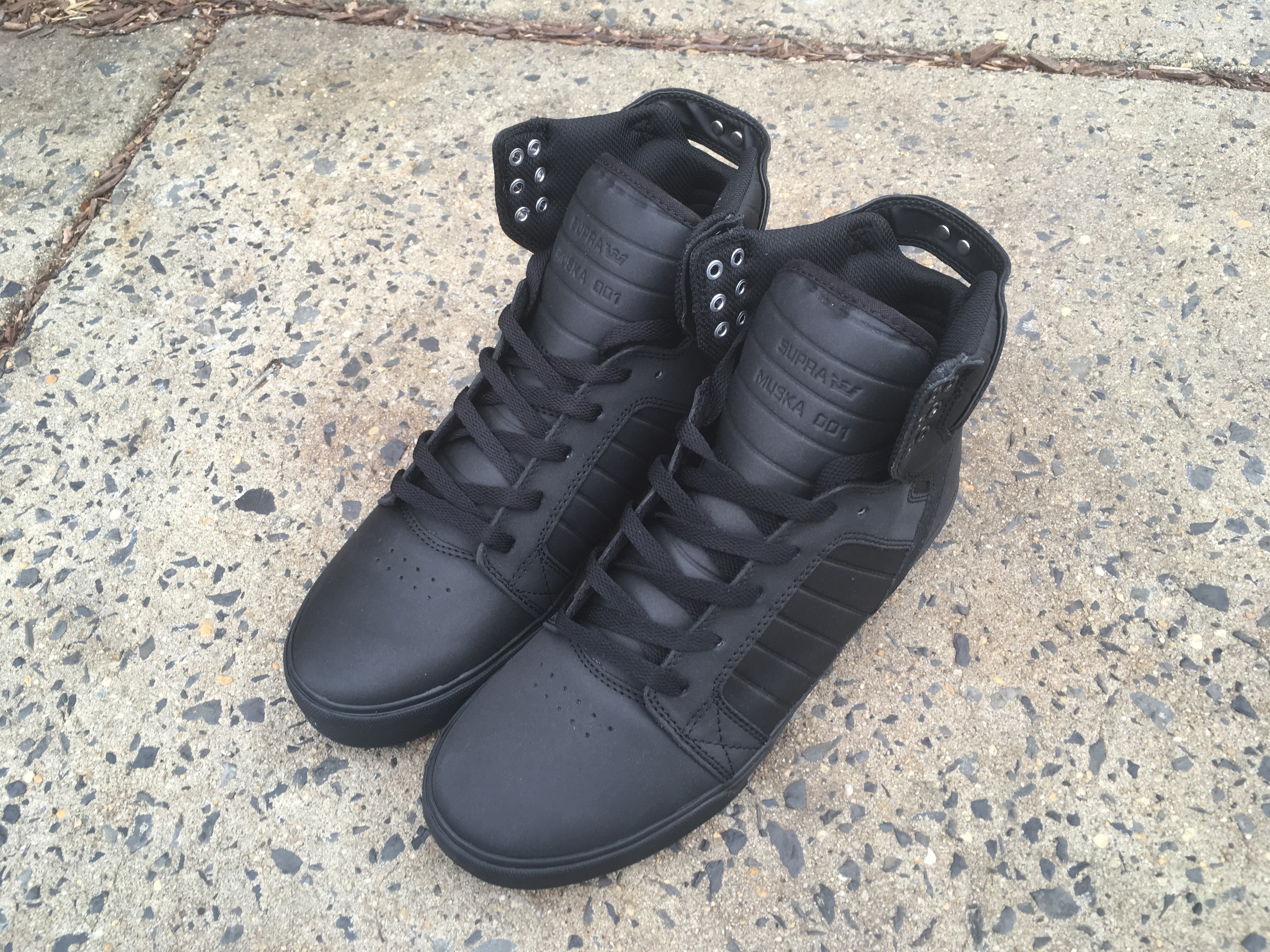
- A pair of Supra Skytop shoes
- Industry: Footwear
- Founded: 2006; 20 years ago
- Founder: Angel Cabada
- Headquarters: United States
- Products: Skate shoes

Supra was an American skate shoe brand founded in Los Angeles, California by Angel Cabada in partnership with professional skateboarders. Korean fashion retailer F&F acquired the global trademark of Supra in October 2020.

== History ==
Supra was launched in 2006, by Angel Cabada in partnership with professional skateboarders Jim Greco, Erik Ellington, Tom Penny, Chad Muska, and Dennis Martin. Muska has described the founding of the company as an "underground idea, shared between five people, that became a crazy explosion". The brand released a coffee table book in December 2012 that documents its history; in an interview for the book's promotion, Ellington stated "It's amazing to see something be so successful that easily could've gone the other way. I feel blessed, honored and I'm humbled. It's something I'm really proud to be a part of." In addition to serving as a catalog of the brand's products, the book also features the brand's team riders and collaborations, including those with artists such as Jay-Z.

On January 31, 2013, Video Director Dennis Martin created a promotional video for Greco's second signature shoe, "The Hammer"; Greco's first signature model was named "The Soprano". Greco explained, in relation to the "Hammer", "I wanted to make a super simple-looking shoe. There's a million shoes out there that are simple, but I really wanted that fusion of vulcanized and cup sole because I like the feel of the vulc, but I like the impact absorbing features of the cup sole". The shoe's design was promoted as "a high performance, lightweight, low-top skate shoe. The upper has a short eye stay, a long vamp, and minimal branding".

Supra Footwear was purchased by K-Swiss Global Brands, a subsidiary of E-Land Group, in June 2015. In 2018, Steve Harden, former executive leader with Adidas and Oakley, was recruited to relaunch and restructure the Global Supra and KR3W brands. In May 2019, Xtep disclosed that it was acquiring 100% of the outstanding shares of E-Land Footwear USA Holdings Inc. As of October 2020, F&F acquired Supra Footwear and relaunched the brand in South Korea in January 2021.

== Collaborations ==
The brand has released signature model shoes from team riders, such as Muska, Ellington, Jim Greco, Tom Penny, and Stevie Williams. A collaboration occurred between producer and DJ Steve Aoki and Supra for Muska's signature model shoe. Williams released a collaboration with hip hop artist and entrepreneur Lil Wayne in December 2012, promoted as a "synthesis of skateboarding and hip hop".
