= Jim Greco =

American skateboarder (born 1977)

Personal information
- Born: December 25, 1977 (age 48) West Haven, Connecticut, U.S.

Jim Greco (born December 25, 1977) is an American professional skateboarder.

He established Bakerboys Distribution with Andrew Reynolds and Erik Ellington in 2007. Bakerboys Distribution provides distribution for closely related in-house skateboard companies.

He co-founded Deathwish Skateboards in 2008, along with Erik Ellington.

== Early life ==
Greco was born on 25 December 1977 in West Haven, Connecticut. He is of Italian descent, with roots in Naples.

== Skateboarding ==
Greco has appeared in videos such as Zero's Misled Youth, Asian Goddess, Baker Bootleg, Baker 2G, Baker 3, Baker Has A Deathwish, and The Deathwish Video.

In 2005, Greco became part of a new footwear company called Supra, along with Erik Ellington, Tom Penny, Antwuan Dixon, Chad Muska, and KR3W owner Angel Cabada. Some of his pro model shoes were the "Thunder" and the "Hammer" for Supra footwear.

In 2016, Greco released a skateboarding film titled The Way Out, which focuses on his journey through the 11th and 12th years of his sobriety. The film features a cameo from Jeremy Klein and cinematography by Joey Sinko and Tobin Yelland

in 2017, Greco released Year 13, a 21-minute long follow up to The Way Out. It chronicles his 13th year of sobriety and features him skating in Los Angeles, along with cameos from Jeremy Klein, Jason Lee, Chris Pastras, and Danny Sargent, with cinematography by Joey Sinko and Tobin Yelland.

== Entrepreneur ==
Greco co-founded a new eyewear company called Brigada with Ellington, Andrew Reynolds, and Terry Kennedy in 2007. The company was financed solely by their own savings. The Bakerboys Distribution company was established in the same year, in partnership with Reynolds and Ellington.

Greco left Baker Skateboards in 2008, along with Ellington and Dixon, to start Deathwish Skateboards, which is distributed by Bakerboys Distribution. As of October 2014, Bakerboys Distribution consists of the following brands: Deathwish Skateboards, Baker Skateboards, Heroin Skateboards, Shake Junt, Brigada, Vol. 4, Palace, and Hammers.

Greco's skateboard and clothing brand "Hammers" was launched in October 2014 as part of Bakerboys Distribution. Greco explained in August 2014 that the brand is "based on individuality, the pure moment of creation ... It's just based on creating." In the first Hammers catalog, Greco explains that the company's products are made in the U.S. "which in turn creates American jobs and manufactures better products".

== Personal life ==
As of 2012, Greco resides in Los Angeles, California.
