= Lyon 25 =

Popular skateboarding location in Lyon, France

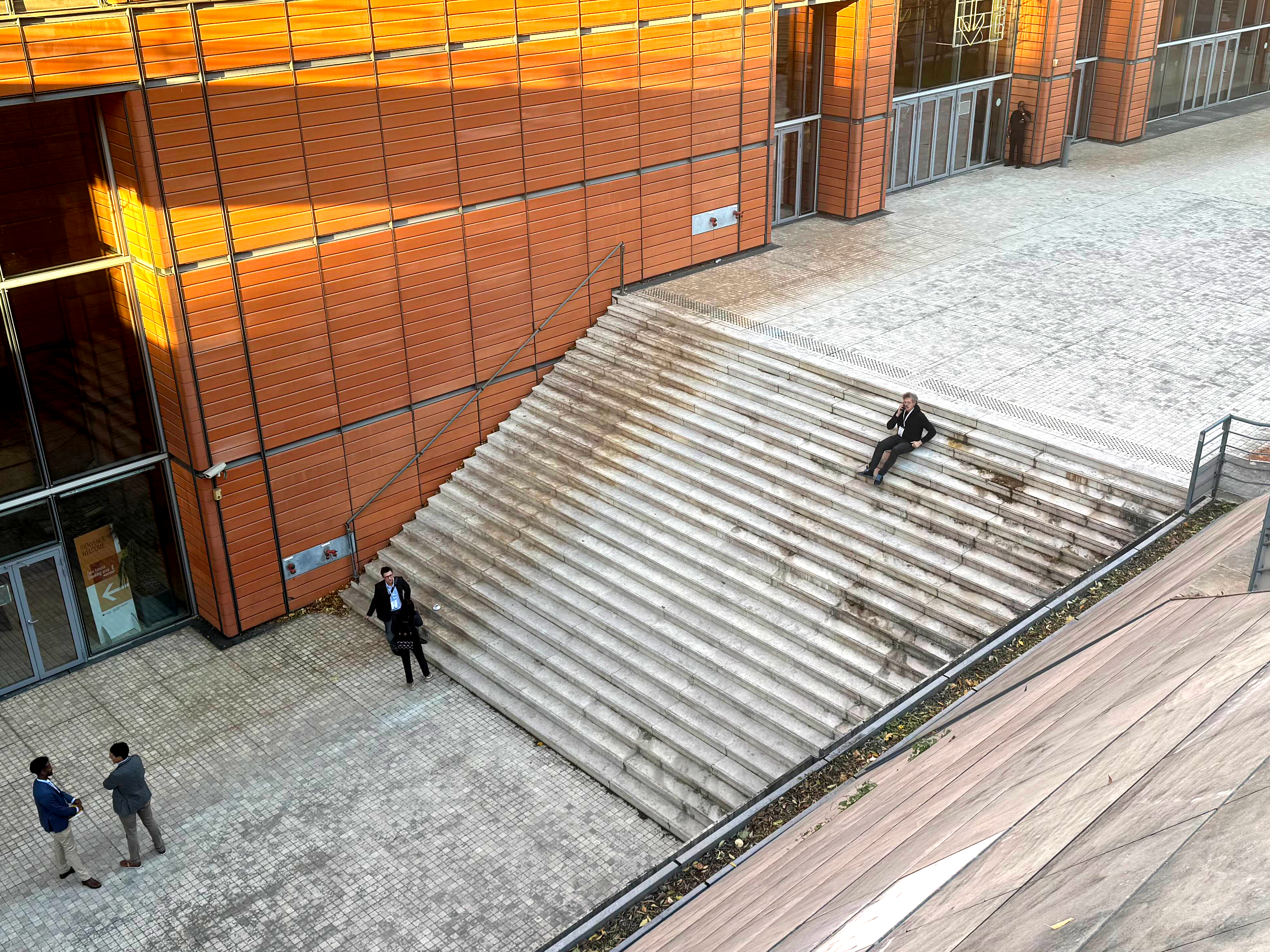
- The Lyon 25, with convention attendees shown for scale
- Interactive map of Lyon 25
- Location: Palais des congrès de Lyon, Cité Internationale, Lyon, France
- Coordinates: 45°47′05″N 4°51′16″E
- Length: 6.7 m (22 ft)
- Height: 4.5 m (15 ft)

The Lyon 25 is a 25-step staircase in Lyon, France, and a popular location in the skateboarding community. It is located within the campus of the Palais des congrès de Lyon in Cité Internationale, within the 6th arrondissement of Lyon. It gained notoriety in 2002, when Swedish skateboarder Ali Boulala attempted, but failed, to ollie the steps in the Flip Skateboards video Sorry.

== History ==
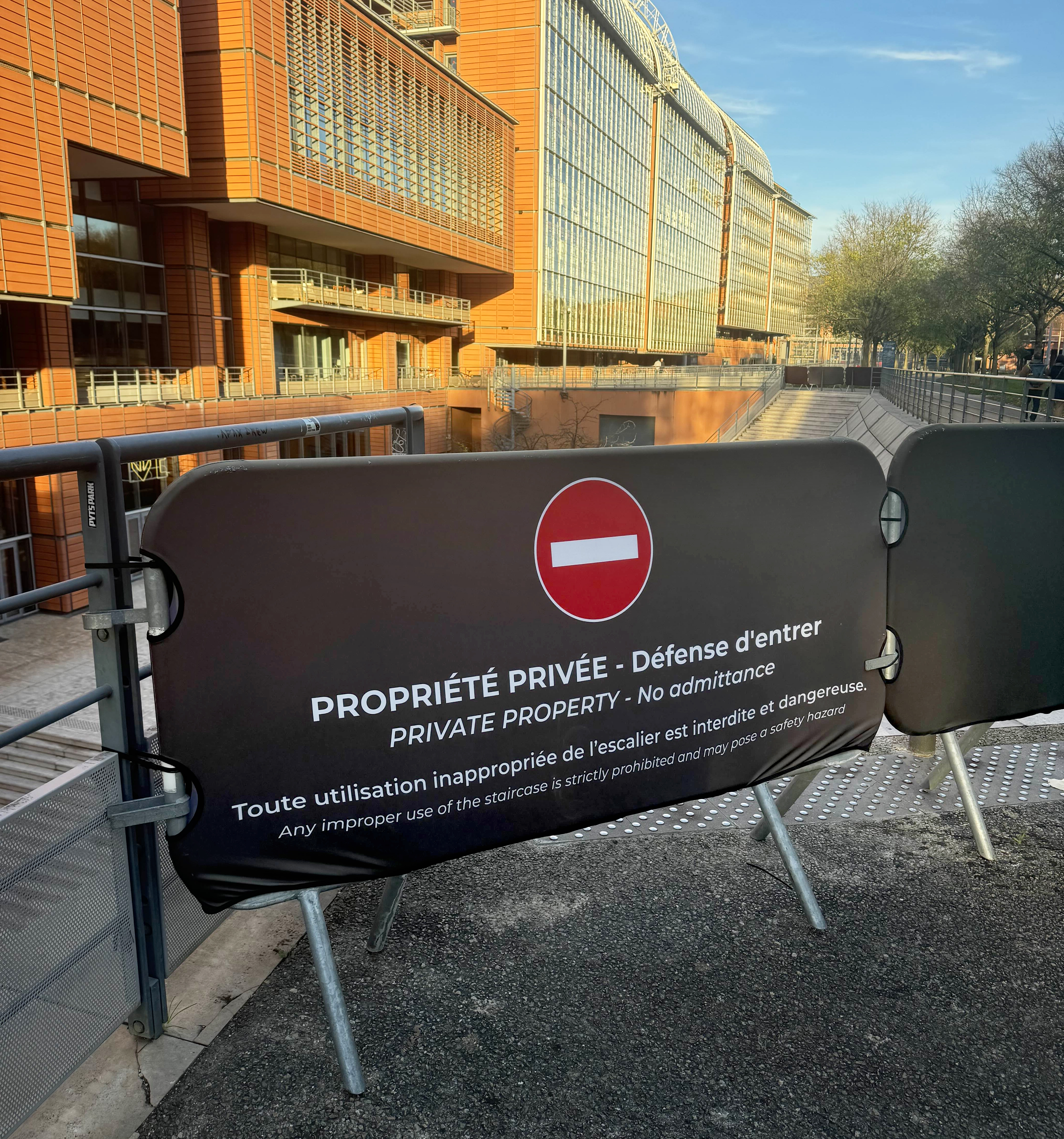
As of 2025, a barrier blocks entry to the Lyon 25 staircase.

The Lyon 25 is on the campus of the Palais des congrès de Lyon, a convention center designed by Renzo Piano in 1989, and inaugurated in 1996. The stairs are on the south side of the structure, facing the Parc de la Tête d'or, and lead to the ground floor of the building. It is 6.7 metres (22 ft) in length and 4.5 metres (15 ft) in height.

In 2017, tactile paving was added to the upper landing, which was decried by skateboarders as an anti-skate device. In 2025, the staircase was surrounded by barriers and made inaccessible to visitors.

== Attempts ==
In 2002, Swedish skateboarder Ali Boulala chose the staircase as a location for his video Sorry, produced for Flip Skateboards. On his first attempt, he landed with such force that his skateboard snapped in half; on a later attempt, Boulala kicked his skateboard away from him while falling, landing on his feet. He was left unable to skateboard for two months.

In 2014, the staircase was again attempted by American skateboarder Aaron "Jaws" Homoki, who admired Sorry. Homoki tore his MCL on his first attempt, requiring hospitalization and leaving him unable to skateboard for six months. In 2015, Homoki returned to the staircase and successfully completed the jump, with Boulala in attendance, after five days of attempts. In response, American professional skateboarder Tony Hawk celebrated Homoki, texting him "Congrats. That is one of the greatest feats in skateboarding history."

The Lyon 25 has since been attempted by other skateboarders and stunt athletes. Failed and successful attempts have been made on a BMX bike, a skimboard, a kick scooter, and freerunning parkour, among others.

== Legacy ==
Since Boulala's Sorry and Homoki's success, the staircase has become famous among skateboarders. Sociologist Paul O'Connor described the staircase as a "pilgrimage spot" for skateboarders. For many, the site is sacred for Boulala's attempt, and his film's focus on bailing, injury, and ultimate failure is an exemplary example of "realness" in skateboarding.

The stairs' interest to skateboarders has also drawn interest from nudge theory: education researcher Alan Reid argues their design inherently inspires some individuals to perform stunts.
