= Theotis Beasley =

American skateboarder

Personal information
- Full name: Theotis Beasley
- Born: February 16, 1991 (age 35) Inglewood, California, U.S.

Sport
- Country: United States
- Sport: Skateboarding

Theotis Beasley (born February 16, 1991) is an American skateboarder from Inglewood, California.

== Personal life ==
Born in Inglewood, CA, Theotis Beasley is a graduate of Morningside High School.

Beasley is a car enthusiast who currently drives a Bentley GT.

== Skateboarding career ==
Beasley started skating at age 11 when his cousin gave him a skateboard. He grew up down the street from the Hawthrone skatepark where he spent considerable time. At Hawthorne, Beasley witnessed and skated alongside professional skateboarders he looked up to including Louie Lopez and Antwuan Dixon. The Hawthrone skatepark is where Andrew Reynolds discovered Beasley when Theotis was 12-years old. Reynolds went by the park with Dustin Dollin, Ryan "Beagle" Ewing, and Erik Ellington, noticing the young Beasley. After seeing him skate, Baker Skateboards put Beasley on flow.

Beasley received attention in the skateboarding community for his part in the 2005 skate video 'Baker 3' produced by Baker Skateboards. Beasley, 14 years old at the time of the release, skated to Machine Gun by the Commodores and ended his part with a switch heelflip down a 9-stair. In Baker 3, his skate part follows Dustin Dollin's part and precedes Rammy Issa's. After the Baker 3 video came out, Beasley turned Am for Baker.

In 2008, Beasley released a part in the video Struggle produced by Chito Tafy Films. In 2009, Beasley released a part in the Nike SB video Debacle by Jason Hernandez, sharing a song, Pretty Please (Love Me), with Shane O'Neill. In 2011, Beasley released a part in the Shake Junt - Chicken Bone Nowison video. Also in 2011, Beasley released a part in the Transworld video - Not Another Transworld Video.

In 2011, Theotis Beasley, at the age of 20, was promoted to the rank of pro by Baker Skateboards and Nike SB. Andrew Reynolds surprised Beasley with the announcement and a pro deck at the Transworld Awards, where Beasley thought he was only scheduled to present an award.

In 2012, Beasley released a part in the Baker video - Bake & Destroy, sharing a song, Sylvester - Do You Wanna Funk, with Terry Kennedy and Jeff Lenoce.

In 2017, Beasley released a "Hip Hop Hijack" Part - produced by Nike SB. Lil Wayne has a guest trick in Beasley's part, doing a boardslide on a jersey barrier.

=== Sponsors ===
Nike SB, Baker, Stance, Thunder, Spitfire, Shake Junt, Muzik headphones, Bones Bearings, Brooklyn Projects, Savini Rims, Mountain Dew, Young Money
