= Stance (brand) =

American clothing brand

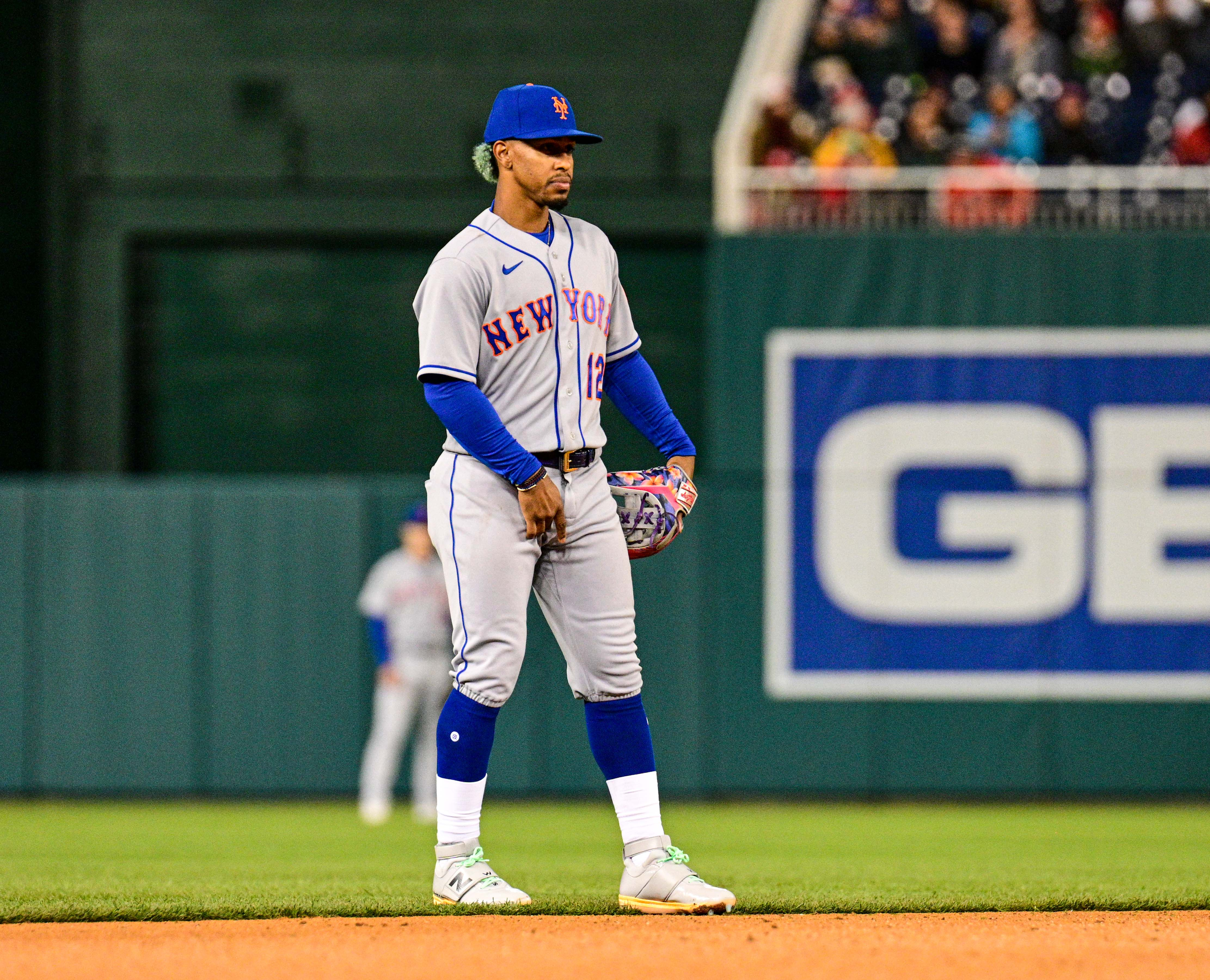
- MLB player Mark Vientos wearing Stance socks on field during a game
- Type: Delaware C Corporation
- Industry: Clothing
- Founded: 2009; 17 years ago
- Headquarters: San Clemente, California, United States
- Area served: United States
- Key people: Jeff Kearl (Chairman & CEO); John Wilson (President)
- Products: Socks, underwear, T-Shirts
- Revenue: est. $180 million (2015)
- Website: www.stance.com

Stance is an American sock, underwear and T-Shirt brand founded in December 2009. Stance is headquartered in San Clemente, California. As of March 2015, the company had sold over 36 million pairs of socks and raised over $115 million from investors.

Stance was named the official sock of the NBA and MLB in April 2015 and May 2016, respectively.

The company has 18 US retail stores in Irvine, Las Vegas, Cabazon, Livermore, Los Angeles, Miami, New York City, Orlando, Portland, Salt Lake City, San Clemente, San Diego, Tulalip, New Jersey, Chicago, and Minnesota. In October 2018, Stance opened their first International store in Covent Garden, London, England.

== History ==
Stance was founded in 2009 by Jeff Kearl, John Wilson, Aaron Hennings, Ryan Kingman and Taylor Shupe. The five original founders saw an opportunity to address a category of fashion they felt had been overlooked by many brands and the majority of the industry.

The company first began shipping product in August 2010, and now ships over 15 million pairs of socks each year. Stance has raised a significant amount of venture capital and is sold in over 40 countries worldwide.

In early January 2015, Stance began raising $50 million to fund their expansion into the underwear market. In April 2016, Stance raised an additional $30 million in a funding round that valued Stance at $400 million and was led by Mercato Partners and included August Capital, Kleiner Perkins Caufield & Byers, Menlo Ventures, Shasta Ventures, and Sherpa Capital as returning investors.

In March 2015, the Wall Street Journal reported the company had raised $50 million from Silicon Valley venture capital firms and that the brand would be expanding into men’s underwear. In April 2015, the NBA announced that Stance had been named the official on-court sock of the NBA starting in the 2015-2016 season. As part of the deal, Stance would be allowed to display its logo on all socks worn on-court by players, a first in NBA history for apparel companies. Stance opened its first store in the SoHo neighborhood of New York City in November 2015.

The brand won Best Socks of the Year in 2017 with their tribute to rapper, Gucci Mane.

== Sponsorship ==
Stance’s brand ambassadors are called "Punks and Poets". They include musicians, skateboarders, athletes, designers, artists, stylists, writers and photographers.

Athletes

- Andre Drummond
- Allen Iverson
- Chandler Parsons
- Donovan Mitchell
- Dwyane Wade
- Klay Thompson
- Lauren Fleshman
- Todd Richards
- Bryan Gonnella
- Kassia Meador
- John John Florence
- Silje Norendal
- Nyjah Huston
- Chris Cole
- Theotis Beasley
- Jamie Thomas
- Andrew Reynolds
- Kenny Roczen
- Chad Reed
- Troy Lee
- Bubba Watson
- Mikey Wright
- Neen Williams
- Daniel Ricciardo

Musicians/Bands

- Wen Junhui
- Soko
- Haim
- Billie Eilish
- Nikki Lane
- Lil Uzi Vert
- Kid Cudi
- Thurzday
- Santigold
- Rihanna
- Big Sean
- Willow Smith
- A$AP Ferg

Models

- Bambi Northwood-Blyth
- Hanne Gaby Odiele

Designers and Stylists

- Imogene Barron
- Ronnie Fieg
- Alexandra Spencer/4th & Bleeker

Artists

- Brooke Reidt
- Josie Ramondetta
- Langley Fox Hemmingway
- Mark Oblow
- Russ Pope
- Kid Creature
- Todd Francis
- Bijou Karman

== See also ==
- List of sock manufacturers
