= Christian Rosa =

Brazilian-Austrian artist (born 1979)

Christian Rosa (born 1979) is a Brazilian-born artist. His works are built up from individual shapes and marks on large untreated canvases, using charcoal, oil paint, resin and pencil as well as large abstract sculptures.

On October 13, 2021, Rosa was indicted by a federal court in Manhattan on three counts, for his alleged role in the sale of forged works purportedly by Raymond Pettibon.

== Early life ==
Rosa was born in Rio de Janeiro, Brazil in 1979. His parents moved when he was young to Vienna, Austria, where he was educated.

He studied under German artist Daniel Richter at the Academy of Fine Arts Vienna.

== Art career ==
Rosa first began exhibiting in Vienna in 2008. He had his first major gallery solo show, "Love's gonna Save the Day", at Contemporary Fine Arts in Berlin, Germany in May 2014, during Berlin Gallery Weekend, followed by a solo show at White Cube Mason's Yard in London, "Put Your Eye in Your Mouth", which opened on 20 March 2015.

In 2014-15 he exhibited frequently throughout Europe, the United States and South America, finishing his year with White Cube's solo show "Mais que nada" in São Paulo, Brazil.

He participated in the Venice Biennale "Momenta" in 2013, as well as the Brucennial 2012 in New York. He also participated in a group exhibition at the Saatchi Gallery in 2014, "Pangaea: New Art from Africa and Latin America".

== Reception ==
Several critics described Rosa's art as part of the "Zombie Formalism" movement, a derogatorily-named style of abstract art that gained popularity from the early to mid-2010s, that was seen as derivative of abstract expressionism, and attracted the interest of investment focused collectors as part of a speculative bubble. David Geers wrote that Rosa's work "withdraws into the nostalgia of Joan Miró or Alexander Calder".

== Other projects ==
Rosa was the executive producer for A Wonderful Cloud, a film written and directed by Eugene Kotlyarenko, which had its world premiere on 15 March at the 2015 SXSW festival.

In 2018 Rosa collaborated with Baker Skateboards to release a limited edition series of skateboard decks featuring Rosa's artworks.

== Legal issues ==
In January 2021 he was accused of stealing and partially forging a Raymond Pettibon painting. On October 13, 2021, Rosa was federally indicted by the FBI and Southern District of New York on one count of wire fraud conspiracy, one count of wire fraud, and one count of aggravated identity theft, for his alleged role in a scheme selling forged Pettibon paintings with fake certificates of authenticity. On 2 December it was reported that Rosa had been arrested in Portugal, and was in the process of being extradited to the United States to face charges. As of October 2023, the status of the case is unclear, with Rosa reported to be residing in Vienna where he has previously been resident.

In 2023, Rosa was tried in Austria on charges of threatening and insulting Chinese-Austrian restaurateur Martin Ho a decade prior.
