= Palais des congrès de Lyon =

Convention centre in Lyon, France

Coordinates: 45°47′07″N 4°51′29″E

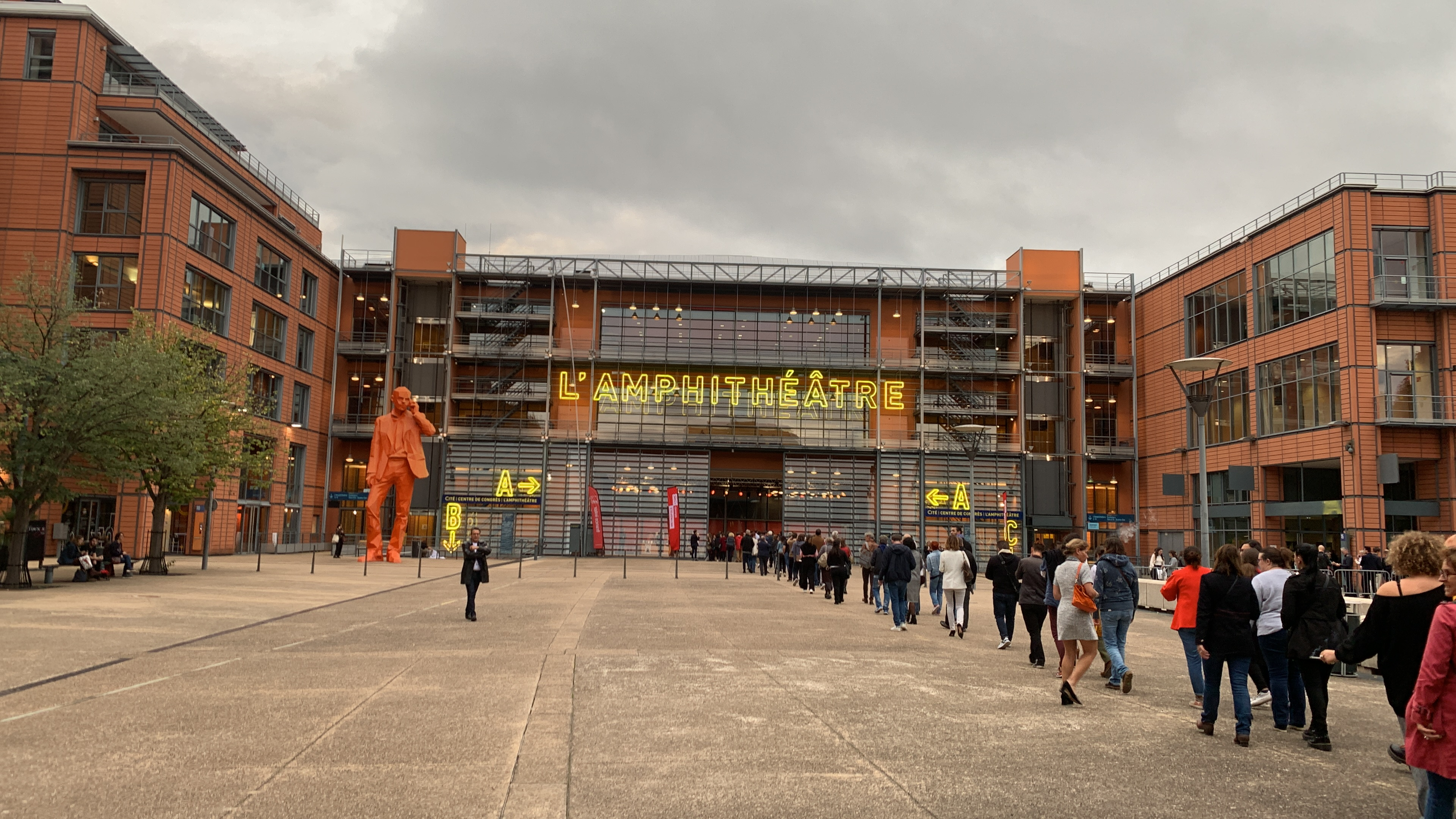
Entrance of the center's amphitheater (2022)

The Centre de Congrès de Lyon (English: Lyon Convention Center), also known as "Cité des Congrès de Lyon" or "Palais des Congrès de Lyon", is a convention center located in the Cité Internationale, a newly-built district of Lyon, France, in the 6th arrondissement.

It hosts economic and scientific events such as seminars, conferences, exhibitions, and conventions. It is also a venue for the arts, regularly hosting concerts and performances, as well as festive events such as parties and gala dinners.

The center was designed by architect Renzo Piano. It was opened in 1996 and work on its expansion was completed in 2006. The site encompasses a total area of 25,000 m² and can accommodate up to 19,000 people.

== Overview ==
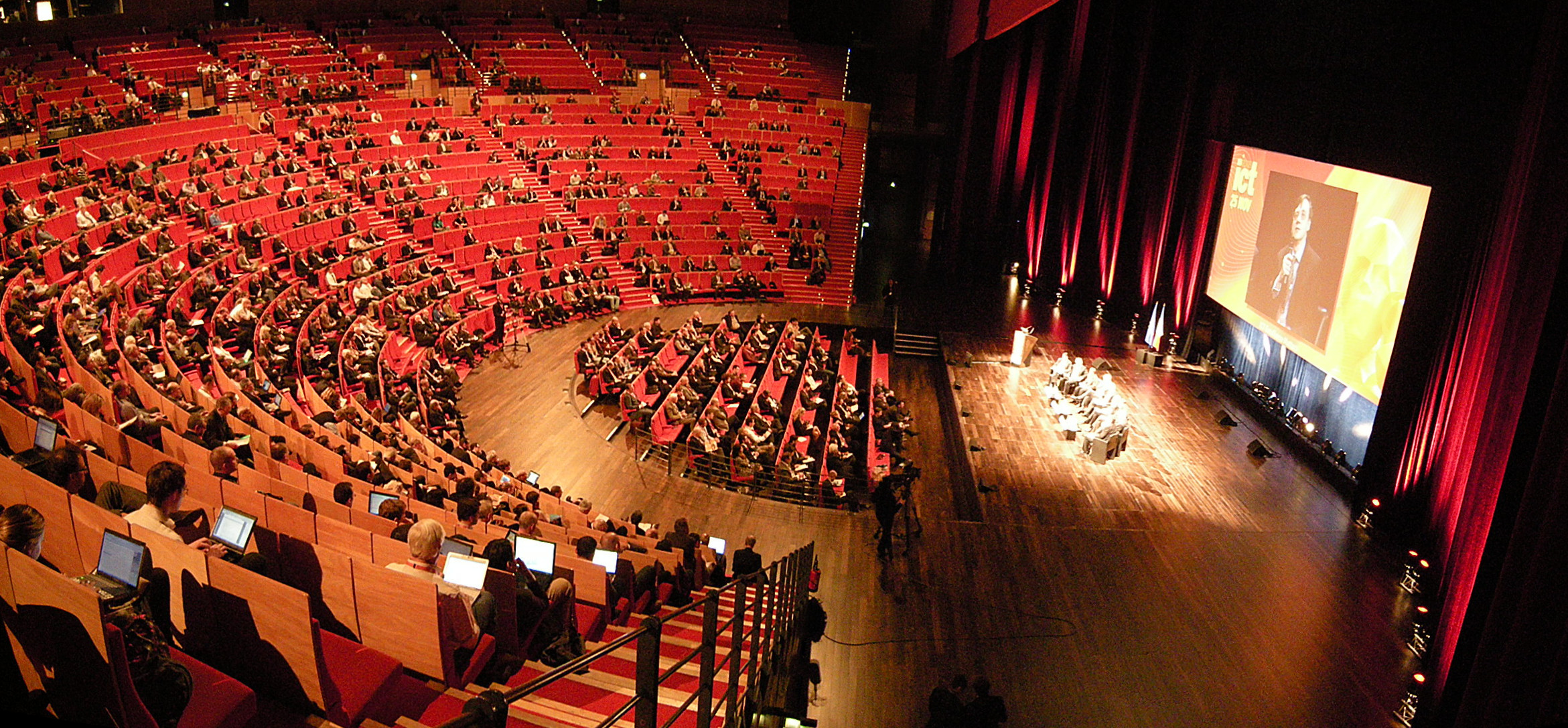
Interior of the Amphithéâtre 3000 during a formal gathering in 2008 (left), and ahead of a live performance in 2023 (right)

The Lyon Convention Center consists of an amphitheater with more than 3,000 seats, called "Salle 3000" (also known as "Amphithéâtre 3000"), two auditoriums (the 900-seat "Lumière" Auditorium, and the 300-seat "Pasteur" Auditorium), an 8,400 m² art exhibition space, twenty-six meeting rooms seating between 50 and 450 people, and three reception areas measuring 300 m², 800 m², and 1,860 m² respectively.

Outside the building is a staircase with twenty-five steps that has become a popular skateboarding spot known as Lyon 25

In its first six months, the Palais des Congrès de Lyon hosted 120,000 spectators/audience members in 12 shows and 30,000-40,000 conventioneers in 11 conventions. It enabled Lyon to be among the European cities regularly hosting major international conferences.

== Events ==
The Lyon Convention Center hosts or has hosted recurring events such as the Lumière Festival, the Salon du Chocolat, the Salon de l'immobilier (real estate fair), Patrimonia (heritage and investment fair) and Innorobo (annual event dedicated to robotics that was held in Lyon annually but and is now held in Paris since 2016). In addition to these annual events, there are one-time events and a lineup of concerts and performances held at the center's "Salle 300".

The Lyon Convention Center also notably host the "Biennale de la danse de Lyon" (Lyon Dance Biennale), a contemporary dance festival founded in Lyon in 1984 and held every two years, alternating with the "Biennale d'art contemporain" (Contemporary Art Biennale).

== Cité internationale of Lyon ==
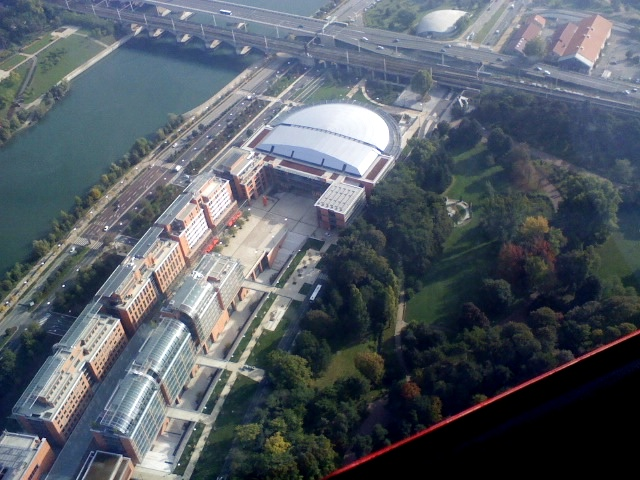
Aerial view of the Cité internationale de Lyon, with the Lyon Convention Center's amphitheater visible at its extremity

In addition to the convention hall, the Cité internationale includes an underground public parking with 1,200 spots, an exhibition area of 5,400 m^{2}, ten new rooms of commissions of 1,500 m^{2}, a residential hotel, two 4-star hotels, several restaurants, a commercial center and a 4000-m^{2} tertiary public square.
