= Arto Saari =

Finnish skateboarder and photographer

Personal information
- Nationality: Finnish
- Born: November 9, 1981 (age 44) Seinäjoki, Finland
- Occupation(s): Skateboarder, photographer
- Years active: 1998–present

Sport
- Country: Finland
- Sport: Skateboarding
- Turned pro: 2001

Arto Saari (born November 9, 1981) is a Finnish professional skateboarder and photographer.

== Early life ==
Saari was born in Seinäjoki, Finland. His mother was supportive of his skateboarding and his first skateboard was a Vision Gator model.

== Skateboarding ==
Saari first attracted attention from the global skateboarding community when he won silver at the skateboarding world championships in Munster, Germany in 1998 at the age of 16 years. Following the event, Saari was invited by professional skateboarder Danny Way to tour Canada with Plan B, Platinum, and the Red Dragons teams, and received a mailed airline ticket at his family home. Saari's professional skateboarding career commenced following his decision to relocate to the United States after joining Flip Skateboards.

Saari was selected as the "2001 Skater of the Year" by Thrasher. To this day Saari remains one of only two Europeans to ever win the industry's premier award. After receiving the award, Saari stated, "I never thought it would actually like ... whatever, happen to me, or what not. Like, it's just one of those things that's just come out of the blue, you know?"

In what was perceived as a shocking decision by the global skateboard community, Saari announced his decision to leave Flip in 2008 due to the distress that was caused by the death of Flip rider Shane Cross. Saari joined the team at Alien Workshop. In an interview with skateboard journalist, Chris Nieratko, following his decision (Saari later contacted Nieratko to prevent the interview from being published and the journalist published it on his personal website instead), Saari explained the process of leaving Flip:

It was really heavy but they [Flip] took it pretty good. I thought they were going to come and chop my legs off but they were very reasonable about it but it’s been a heavy process. It’s been on good terms. I just felt like I had to move on. I changed all my other sponsors, I might as well. Why stop now? New knee, new liver, new shoe company, new board sponsor ... Yeah, I did shed a few tears. It’s like getting a divorce; even though I’ve never been married other than Flip. I can imagine it’s something like that. There’s parts that you like but there’s parts that you just want to move on past. It’s really hard to deal with. You wonder, ‘Are you going to lose friends? Are you going to lose business?’ It was a tough decision to make and I’m still spun out about it. I can’t believe that it’s all happening but I think it will be for the better for everyone ... I just couldn’t take it any longer. I couldn’t take the madness and I thought it would be better to move on than to stay somewhere where I don’t think I necessarily belong anymore. Things have changed a lot over the years and I thought it would be better to explore something new, to be like a little kid in a candy store.

In the Nieratko interview, Saari also discussed Rowley's response to his decision:

“Don’t do it.” He knew it had to happen. We’re still cool. He understands. He’s like, “Go do your thing. Go skate around.” It was a very, very emotional, gnarly thing. It’s been so many years in the same boat you have to start going in different ways. Sometimes the ship gets too small, too many egos, you got to jump overboard and catch the next one and see where that takes you.

In 2012, Saari provided further insight into his decision to leave Flip, citing the death of former teammate, Shane Cross, as a significant underpinning factor: "It wasn't, like, a easy thing to do, but, at the time, I knew I had to do it ... for the reasons that happened, you know? And that's why I decided that it's better off for me to leave Flip than, just, go my own way and, just, do that." Professional skateboarder, Ed Templeton, stated in a 2012 interview: "I mean I was completely shocked when he left Flip ... it didn't make sense."

At the start of January 2011, Flip announced that Saari had rejoined the team and released an image that featured Saari alongside the caption: "Home is Where the Hearto Is". A video segment was also published on the website of Thrasher magazine and featured Rowley, Saari and Thrasher editor-in-chief, Jake Phelps, discussing the decision in Phelps' office in San Francisco, US. Saari explained to Phelps that Flip is like "family" and stated "You can take a man out of Flip, but you can't take the Flip out the man".

In 2012, Fox disclosed the process of re-recruiting Saari:

I went up and saw him with Geoff, one day, because it seemed like he really ... well, I could tell; we could all tell that he wanted to be back on the team. Arto's not a very pushy person, at all. Never the guy who will ask for anything, and I just said to Geoff one day, "Let's just, we need to drive up there and then, and just put him back on the team. Make him put himself back on; because, otherwise, this is never going to happen." Maybe he'd grown up and realized that it might be a little dysfunctional family, but it is my family.

Also in 2012, Rowley confirmed that "It came from Arto, you know, saying that, like, this is where he belonged, kinda thing ... We know each other long enough to know, when you're hanging out with someone that, hey, like, okay, he's ready now." Saari has also stated:

It was a pretty unspoken thing. It wasn't until the last minute that, it was like, "You wanna get back on?" I was like, "Yeah". We [Rowley and Saari] probably didn't talk for like a year or two. There was this vibe. That's how I grew up skating; those are the guys who brought me up, backed me up. And I was, like, "You know what? I gotta, I gotta get back on."

Alongside professional skateboarders Stevie Williams, Brandon Biebel, and Tony Alva, Saari completed a photo and video shoot for Playboy that was shot by Irish photographer Tony Kelly. The shoot is entitled "Playboy Poolside" and features the four subjects skateboarding in and around an empty swimming pool.

In a February 2014 radio interview with Thrasher magazine, Saari identified his video part in Flip's Sorry as the video appearance that he is most proud of.

Saari has had several major injuries during his career. Saari was nineteen years of age when he almost died of brain injuries, suffered as he was warming up for the execution of a trick on a handrail. The incident was represented in the form of a cartoon in Flip's first video, Sorry.

Saari appears as a playable character in the video games Evolution Skateboarding, Tony Hawk's Underground, and Tony Hawk's Proving Ground.

=== Sponsors ===
As of July 2014, Saari is sponsored by Flip Skateboards, New Balance Numeric, WeSC, Ricta, CCS, MOB, Destructo Trucks and hOme Watches.

In late 2012, the Burton company announced a major restructure in accordance with a plan to focus more closely on its core business; consequently, the skateboard teams of the Gravis and Analog brands were dissolved. Saari's move to WeSC was announced on April 26, 2013, following Saari's selection as the first skateboarder of the international team of hOme Watches—alongside snowboarders Travis Rice, Gigi Rüf and Mark Sollors—in the previous month. Then, in May 2013, Saari was announced as a member of the New Balance Numeric skate footwear team.

=== Video parts ===
- Transworld: Feedback (with Geoff Rowley) (1999)
- éS: Menikmati (2000)
- Flip: Sorry (2002)
- Flip: Really Sorry (2004)
- Flip: Feast Tour (2006)
- Alien Workshop: Mind Field (2009)

== Photography ==
According to their website, he is one of skateboarders that "have gravitated towards Leica M equipment".

In a May 2011 interview for the CCS web-based channel, Saari identified an old press camera and a Noblex medium-format panoramic camera as two of his favorite possessions—Saari also identifies a framed black and white photograph, taken with the latter camera, of the Helsinki Cathedral as one of his favorite images.

In early 2013, Saari was selected as the photographer for the "Fear and Loathing in Australia" Oakley skateboard tour that featured the sunglasses brand's team riders: Eric Koston, Rune Glifberg, Ryan Sheckler, and Curren Caples. The Oakley site explained that Saari was employed for advertisement campaigns and gallery shows, while his demand as a photographer is equivalent to his popularity at the height of his skateboarding career.

In 2024, Saari published Bike Path, a photo book documenting the bicycle path which winds along the Seven Mile Miracle on the North Shore.

== Personal life ==
In 2017 Saari married his girlfriend Mimi. They have a daughter and a son. As of 2018, Saari and his family reside in Hawaii, on the North Shore of Oahu.

Saari has previously lived in Hollywood, just off Sunset Strip. His home had a pool specifically designed for skateboarding and a separate sauna building. Saari referred to his sauna as "another little piece of Finland" in which you go "onto the top of the pleasure field".
