= Andrew Reynolds (skateboarder) =

American skateboarder (born 1978)

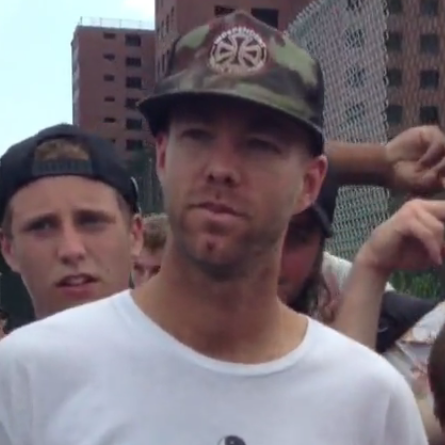
- Reynolds on Go Skateboarding Day in 2012

Personal information
- Nickname: The Boss
- Born: June 6, 1978 (age 48) Lakeland, Florida, U.S.
- Occupation(s): Professional skateboarder, musician
- Years active: 1988–present

Sport
- Country: United States
- Sport: Skateboarding
- Turned pro: 1995

Andrew Reynolds (born June 6, 1978) is an American professional skateboarder and musician. He is known for co-founding Baker Skateboards in 2000 with artist Jay Strickland, and for his numerous high-profile skating appearances.

Reynolds established Bakerboys Distribution with Erik Ellington and Jim Greco in 2007. Bakerboys Distribution provides distribution for closely related in-house skateboard companies such as Deathwish Skateboards and Shake Junt. He is also the head of design at Altamont Apparel. Reynolds primarily skates street. He has been called one of the most influential skaters of all time.

Besides his skateboarding career, Reynolds is a member of the garage rock band The Goat and the Occasional Others, which also consists of fellow skateboarder and photographer Atiba Jefferson.

== Skateboarding career ==
=== Before going pro ===
After graduating high school in his native Lakeland, Florida, Reynolds moved to Huntington Beach, California with the hope of furthering his skate career. Around this time, he was heavily influenced by pro skaters Chad Muska and Tom Penny.

Reynolds emerged into the skateboarding scene in the early 1990s. Following a phone call from pro skater Tony Hawk, Reynolds joined Hawk's then-new skate team Birdhouse. Reynolds has stated that Hawk contacted Reynolds despite knowing little about Reynolds or his skating abilities. Reynolds explained in 2008:

"To me, that was such a trip when they told me, 'The ams [amateurs] on Birdhouse are gonna be you and Ocean Howell.' And I'm like, 'Me! And the guy, from the H. Street video with the Doors song and everything?!' I was like, 'Oh my god!' It's not even right. Some little kid from a hick town, and the other am is Ocean Howell? It's wrong. It just was so wrong. At first, when I met him I was just a fan. But then we became friends. He would get a girl at every demo almost and I'm just... amazed! I thought, 'Man, how does he do it? He's so cool.'"

Professional skateboarder and Emerica team manager Heath Kirchart revealed in 2007 that he perceived Reynolds as his competition, as Reynolds was recruited to Birdhouse after he joined the team. Kirchart further explained:

I don't tell many people this. But there was [a] point, I remember when [we] were filming The End when he kickflip noseslided the UCI ten-stair. I [thought], "Holy shit! Hopefully, I'll do that." And I didn't. But it was my coming to "Wow! He's better than me." And since that time it's been way better than me. He's not just better than me—he's way better than me.

In 1998, Reynolds was featured in the fourth Birdhouse video The End, with a section of his footage from the Bro Bowl in Tampa.

Reynolds' skating profile was featured in the original Tony Hawk's Pro Skater video game.

=== Baker ===
In 2000, Reynolds left Birdhouse and started the Baker brand with Jay Strickland; the company was named after a lifestyle in which a person "gets baked" (smokes and experiences the effects of the drug cannabis) and skateboards every day. In 2007, Reynolds provided a detailed account of the company's beginnings:

Well, I was living in Huntington, riding for Birdhouse. We just thought to ourselves, all these companies are really lame. Birdhouse doesn't promote piles, you know what I mean? Zero's not promoting what we're all about. We met up with Jay Strickland [and] we started telling him about our ideas. "We want do something. We want do a company." And we're like, "All of us, together." It was just a big mess. I went and talked to Tony [Hawk] and Per [Welinder]—"It's either [that] I quit and take a bunch of guys and do something, or you guys help me start a company"

The skateboard deck brand signed a distribution deal with Blitz Distribution, the company that, at the time, was distributing Birdhouse and other brands, such as Fury and Hook-Ups (Blitz had originally been formed by Per Welinder and Hawk to distribute their own products). As of 2008, the brand was the top-selling brand under the Blitz Distribution umbrella. Reynolds has publicly disclosed that all of the Baker team members, including himself, receive the same amount of remuneration: "I get paid the same as Braydon. Dustin tried to ask for more money one time…I had to tell him, like, everybody gets paid the same…there’s no favoritism."

The company then parted ways with Blitz and, in 2007, Reynolds and fellow professional skateboarders, Jim Greco and Erik Ellington, established Bakerboys Distribution to distribute the Deathwish brand. Baker's distribution was then newly managed by Bakerboys in 2011. As of July 2014, Bakerboys distributes seven brands, some of which are owned by past and current Baker riders.

=== Emerica ===
As of November 2018, Reynolds has released thirteen signature shoe models with skateboarding shoe company Emerica: The Reynolds 1, The Reynolds 2, The Reynolds 3, The Boss, The Reynolds Light, The AR Slim, Reynolds Cruisers, The Reynolds Classics, The Reynolds, The Reynolds low, the Reynolds Low Vulc, the Reynolds 3 G6 and the Reynolds G6.

In September 2019, Reynolds and Emerica announced they had parted ways.

=== Altamont Apparel ===
In collaboration with the creative direction of Reynolds, the head designer for the brand is English artist FOS, who is also the owner of the Heroin skateboard brand. As of October 2012, the brand's team includes Mike Watt, Brian Hansen, Neen Williams, Kenny Hoyle, Jon Dickson, Justin Figeroa, and Bryan Herman. Former riders have included Garrett Hill and Theotis Beasley, with a signature Beasley clothing line released in early 2012.

=== Sponsors ===
As of December 2024, Reynolds is sponsored by Baker Skateboards, New Balance, Dime Montreal, Spitfire Wheels, Brigada, Independent, Shake Junt, Stance.

== "Madness" ==
Called "Madness" by Reynolds himself, he experiences a "condition" while skateboarding that has been perceived as a mild form of obsessive compulsive disorder, even though an official diagnosis has not been confirmed. In a 2007 episode of the online show "Epicly Later'd" the Vice YouTube channel depicted an example of the "Madness" while Reynolds was filming a trick in San Francisco, California.: "And he's gonna walk right up to the top and tap the wall three times. And then he comes and checks it [the area where the trick is being performed] again. He's gonna say, 'Lance, Beagle, Mike' ... ready? [Reynolds] 'Lance?' ... 'Beagle?' ... 'Mike?'

As part of the DVD release of the Emerica video Stay Gold, a bonus section on the "Madness" was included. While watching footage of his pre-trick behaviour, Reynolds states, "I don't know what I'm doing right here. Ha ha. I don't know. Like, if you would've told me if someone would've told me, 'You rolled up, without trying a noseslide, twenty times, or thirty times, I woulda said, "Nuh. You're wrong."

== Skateboarding influences ==
In an interview for the online series "Free Lunch", produced by RIDE Channel, Reynolds stated about Hawk:

... and then Tony's just, like, Tony Hawk. Basically, to me, it says, "You can be a skater and take over everything and use skateboarding to be a businessman, a role model to young people." He's just the best. And he called my house when I was fifteen, and [asked] "Do you wanna do something with us?", not knowing anything about me. Yeah, Tony's the man. Sure, he's the best.

In 2012, Reynolds recruited Hawk's son Riley Hawk for Baker and explained the process in an online interview:

... I [thought], "it's kinda touchy, you know what I mean, like?" It's kind of weird, you know? Tony's kid, he rides for Birdhouse. But I look at it [and] I picture him on Baker, you know what I mean? So we just approached Tony [and said] "We want to talk to Riley about maybe getting [him] some Baker boards or something like that." And Tony's like, "Man, he's rippin'. He's nineteen years old. It's really up to him. You guys talk to him." So we just kind of said, "You wanna get some boards?" He's like, "I'm down, man!" And [the way] I look at it, there would be no Baker without Tony and Birdhouse. I know it's an ongoing process, you know? Tony quits to start Birdhouse. I quit to start Baker. My guys quit to start a new brand. It's just an ongoing thing.

On Mark Gonzales, Reynolds has stated:

Gonz is the most influential skater of all time, no question. Mark Gonzales created how to street skate, doing handrails and things that no one has ever done. When people were doing a boardslide on the rail and thought that was super crazy, he was doing 180 nosegrinds and 180 fakie 50-50s. The best and most technical skater today doing the hardest tricks beyond what anyone could think of is not doing what Gonz was doing then. It’s just not the same.

Reynolds has also been a vocal supporter of Flip professional skateboarder Tom Penny and stated in a 2009 article, entitled The Church of Tom Penny:

The switch flip. It’s unexplainable. That whole thing is just like the Penny package. It’s like a display. Not many people have got kickflip, frontside flip, switch frontside flip and switch flip all looking exactly the same. It wasn’t even really that common to do tricks over handrails at that point. He just killed it.

== Influence ==
In December 2011, Reynolds was identified as the tenth most influential skateboarder of all time by Transworld Skateboarding magazine.

Professional skateboarder, friend, and teammate Braydon Szafranski has stated, "You're a complete fucking moron if you don't think that Andrew is the best skater in the world. Every single day he does tricks that I've never seen him do, and I've known him, like, six years." Professional skateboarder, teammate, artist, and company owner Ed Templeton has stated: "I don't know how he does it. I don't know how he jumps down the stuff he jumps down, year after year, and, and, still be like ... I don't know—to me, it's shocking. He's been number one for so long, that it's mind-blowing at this point." Emerica teammate Jerry Hsu has also expressed his admiration of Reynolds:

He just has, like, a really cool obsession with skating... it's like being around a little kid... as long as you are focused on skating, you can do whatever you want. You can... he is pretty nice. He does a lot of crazy shit in skating. Like, you wouldn't believe it. All he, all he eats is fruit. I don't know how he skates when he just eats fruit and salad... oh, he eats tons of vegetables. He's crazy.

In July 2013, professional skateboarder Paul Rodriguez included Reynolds in his "top ten" list of favorite professional skateboarders, explaining: "If you ask me, nobody jumps huge stairs and gaps better than Reynolds. Nobody does it with better style, more grace, or more control ... He’s another guy with amazing style. He is everything you could ever ask in the most pristine pro skateboarder."

== Awards ==
Reynolds won Thrasher Magazine's Skater of the Year award in 1998. For his video part in the 2010 skateboard video Stay Gold, produced by the Emerica brand, Reynolds received Transworld Skateboarding magazine's award for "Best Video Part" in 2011.

== Personal life ==
As of October 2012, Reynolds has abstained from drugs and alcohol for ten years; following a period of problematic drinking and illicit drug use in his early twenties. He also stopped smoking cigarettes after his daughter was born to his former wife Christianna Reynolds.

In response to the question "What in particular triggered you going sober?" in a 2011 interview, Reynolds replied:

Cocaine - just messing with hard drugs and not being able to stop. My drinking was way out of control; I couldn't drink one beer without ending up blacking out and doing drugs. It would happen over and over again. Probably from like seventeen years old to twenty-four, I just didn't know how to control my intake of drugs or alcohol. It just happens to certain people. You are either that way or you aren't that way, you know? I smoked weed like my life depended on it. Then one day, I woke up and I knew it was a problem. The hard stuff - I knew I shouldn't be messing with it.

He has expressed that his inspiration is his family. In a September 2014 interview, Reynolds expressed concern over the influence that the recorded behavior of "Baker, Pissdrunx and our whole crowd" might have exerted upon young viewers and fans. Reynolds explained that he'd "like to try and repair that" as much as possible and added: "I feel like that’s a good job for me."

In 2008, Reynolds resided in Hollywood, California with his daughter, Stella who is as of 2019 a budding amateur skateboarder. However, in 2012, a report stated that Reynolds had undergone a divorce and subsequently sold the Hollywood house, as well as his Cadillac, in a process of simplification. In response to the life changes that Reynolds has undergone in his older years, Regan has stated, "That’s how he simplifies things down. If you want what he’s got, do what he does."

In a 2012 interview, Reynolds revealed the origin of his nickname "The Boss":

It's just a nickname that [professional skateboarder] Jim Greco came up with. I guess growing up watching mob movies and mob documentaries, there's always like has to be a boss. I had a Cadillac, it was just little stuff. I had an apartment; Jim was like, "He's the Boss". That's it. And then he just kind of stuck with it after that. I don't take part in it. I don't go around [saying] "I'm the Boss", you know? I don't care, whatever.

He shares a birthday with fellow pro skateboarder Geoff Rowley.

== Film ==
Reynolds has been involved with film projects on a minor level. He starred in the short film Shadows (2000) and the feature film Cop and a Half (1993), appearing as "The Skateboard Kid" in the latter. He was also a stunt performer in the documentary Collage (2001).

== Videography ==
- Union Wheels: Right to Skate (1992)
- Birdhouse Projects: Untitled (1992)
- Tracker: DIsturbed (1992)
- Birdhouse Projects: Ravers (1993)
- Tracker: Hi-8 (1995)
- Transworld Skateboarding: 4 Wheel Drive
- Airwalk: Skateboarding Video 96 (1996)
- 411VM: Issue 22 (1997)
- 411VM: Best Of 411, Volume 4 (1997)
- Birdhouse: The End (1998)
- Baker: Baker Bootleg (1998)
- Globe: Canvas (1998)
- Transworld Skateboarding: Feedback (1999)
- Baker: Baker 2G (2000)
- Transworld Skateboarding: Anthology (2000)
- ON Video: Spring (2001)
- ON Video: Fall (2002)
- ON Video: Summer (2002)
- Baker: Summer Tour 2001 (2001)
- ON Video: Hanoi Rocks: Day Late Dollar Short (2002) @ 1:21
- 411VM: Issue 60 (2003)
- Emerica: This Is Skateboarding
- Thrasher: S.O.T.Y. Video (2003)
- 411VM: Issue 56 (2003)
- Transworld Skateboarding: Show Me The Way (2004)
- V7: Teenage Tour (2004)
- Thrasher: Rocket Science (2004)
- Emerica: Kids in Emerica (2004)
- Baker: Baker 3 (2005)
- Thrasher: King of the Road 2006 (2006)
- Strange Notes: Covers, Baby! (2007)
- Emerica: Wild Ride (2007)
- Altamont: The Foreigners (2008)
- Baker/Deathwish: Baker Has A Deathwish (2008)
- Shake Junt: Chicken Bone Nowison (promo) (2009)
- Baker/Deathwish: Baker Has A Deathwish Summer Tour (2009)
- Altamont: Skate Rock East Cost Tour (2010)
- Emerica: Stay Gold (2010)
- Emerica: Stay Gold B-Sides (2010)
- Shake Junt: Chicken Bone Nowison (2011)
- Baker/Thrasher: "Bake and Destroy" (2012)
- Baker Presents "Certi-Fried Pro Rowan Zorilla" Part (2016)
- Emerica - Made - Chapter 2 (2016)
- Baker - “Baker 4” (2019)
- Baker/Deathwish: Baker Has A Deathwish II (2024)
