= Mark Appleyard =

Canadian skateboarder (born 1982)

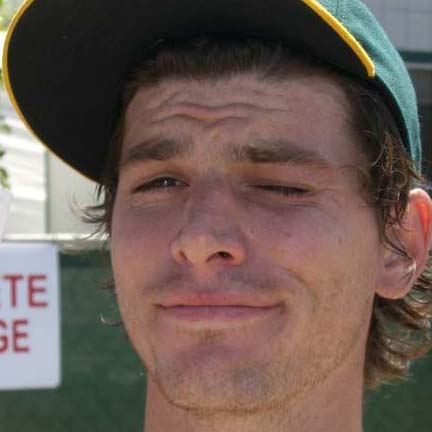
- Appleyard in 2005
- Born: Mark Appleyard; November 11, 1982 (age 43); Oakville, Ontario, Canada
- Occupation: Professional skateboarder
- Children: 2

Mark Appleyard (born November 11, 1982) is a Canadian skateboarder. He was Thrasher Skater of the Year in 2003.

== Sponsors ==
As of 2024, Appleyard is sponsored by Disorder, Globe, Arnette, Autobahn, Thunder, CCS.

== Video parts ==
Company	Filmmaker	Title	Year
Flip		Extremely Sorry	2008
Globe		United by Fate	2007
Volcom		Let's Live	2007
Volcom		Chicagof	2004
Transworld		Show Me the Way	2004
Flip		Really Sorry	2003
Redline Entertainment		Tao of Skateboarding	2003
	Ty Evans	Chomp on This	2002
ON Video Magazine		Fall 2002	2002
Transworld	Jon Holland, Ewan Bowman	In Bloom	2002
Digital Skateboarding		Issue #08 - Invasion	2002
Ill Productions		Rough Crowd	2002
Flip		Sorry	2002
Yo Mama Productions		Underdog	2002
411 Video Magazine		Issue #48	2002
P Stone Productions		Miscellaneous Debris	2001
Nichols / Charnoski		Tobaccoland	2001
Transworld		Videoradio	2001
Transworld		i.e.	2000
Transworld	Ty Evans, Jon Holland	Modus Operandi	2000
Church of Skatan		Oh My God!	2000
Alien Workshop	Joe Castrucci	Photosynthesis	2000
	Josh Stewart	Static	2000
True Motion		Issue #03	1999
Cartel			1998
