= Chad Muska =

American skateboarder (born 1977)

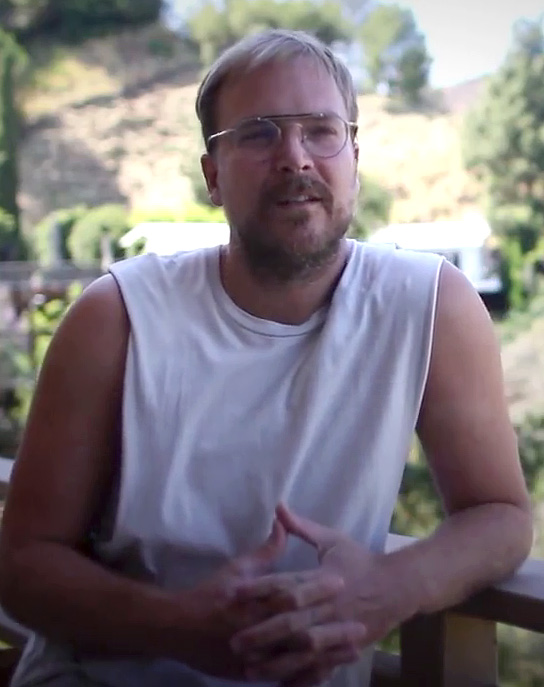
- Muska in 2017

Personal information
- Born: May 20, 1977 (age 49) Lorain, Ohio, U.S.
- Occupations: Skateboarder; entrepreneur; musician
- Years active: 1994–present
- Website: themuska.com

Sport
- Country: United States
- Sport: Skateboarding
- Turned pro: 1999

Chadcherch Michael Muska (born May 20, 1977) is an American professional skateboarder. In November 2012, Skin Phillips, editor-in-chief of Transworld Skateboarding, described Muska as "one of the most marketable pros skateboarding has ever seen". Muska was inducted into the Skateboarding Hall of Fame in 2020.

== Early life ==
Chad Muska was born in Lorain, Ohio to Joel Kevin Muska and Deborah Ann Muska. He has a sister, Lyndsey who is two years younger than him. His father was of Hungarian and Swedish ancestry and his mother is of Serbian ancestry. Muska first became interested in skateboarding as a young person following a relocation to Phoenix, Arizona, where his father was residing at the time. Muska explained in a 2012 interview:

I was riding my BMX bike a lot and then there were some neighborhood kids that would, kinda, skate and I would check them out; and I used to come home from school every day and just stare at 'em, you know? And I would walk by and just watch them skate. They told me this story ... I guess I'd be, like, "Hey, let me try your board", and I would grab their board and would just try and boardslide the curb and go all crazy on it ... Something happened, my bike got stolen, and I got a board off one of the kids, and, from that moment on, it was just, like, full blown ...

While in Arizona, Muska first met and spent time skateboarding with professional skateboarder Erik Ellington prior to both of their careers. Muska eventually moved to Mission Beach in San Diego, California, with very little money, a sketch book, and a portable cassette player to further pursue skateboarding and art.

== Professional skateboarding ==
=== 1994–1996: Maple, Toy Machine, Welcome to Hell ===
Maple was Muska's first-ever skateboard deck company and he appeared in the 1994 video Rites of Passage. At the time, Muska was homeless and living on the beach, with no conception of what the future held for him.

After parting ways with Maple, Muska joined Toy Machine, which is prestigious among professional skateboarders. Muska became a leading member of the Toy Machine team, facilitating Elissa Steamer's sponsorship, and was a team member alongside Ed Templeton, Mike Maldonado, Jamie Thomas, and Brian Anderson. According to skateboarding journalist Adam Salo, in 2009: "In '95–'96, Toy Machine was one of the most respected and emulated teams in skateboarding."

Muska filmed for the Welcome to Hell video, a 1996 project primarily driven by Thomas, and he was expected to receive the highly regarded last part of the video. However, the video premiere was cancelled on the evening of, and his part was omitted from the public video release due to an altercation with both Templeton and Thomas that same night—a skull was placed over his face in the video case artwork.

=== 1997–2005: Shorty's, Fulfill the Dream, Circa ===
Following the issues at Toy Machine, Muska joined the then-fledgling Shorty's brand. Muska was chosen to develop the Shorty's skateboard deck division and the company thrived as a result. He is popularly known for his part in the 1998 skateboarding video Fulfill The Dream, and he appeared in a total of four videos for the company.

Muska was sponsored by the éS skate shoe company (manufactured and distributed by the Sole Technology, Inc. company) in the late 1990s. When the "éS Muska" signature model was released in 1998, it was a popular product in the footwear market, as Muska was an especially popular figure in skateboarding culture during the late 1990s (the shoe was designed with a hidden "stash pocket" in the tongue of the shoe for particularly valuable items). Muska explained in 2013 that he was heavily involved with every aspect of the shoe's design, which was the way he continued for his subsequent skate shoe designs, regardless of the brand.

Following his time with éS, Muska joined the C1RCA footwear team in 1999 as the first pro skater for C1RCA and released numerous signature shoe models with the brand. Models such as the "CM901" and "CM902" were promoted in magazine advertisements, and Muska also continued with the hidden "stash pocket" design feature that he utilized at éS. Thomas was also with the brand at this time, but the previous issues at Toy Machine had been resolved by this time. Muska parted ways with Circa in 2005.

=== 2006–2012: Element, Supra, Skytop (I, II, III) ===
Muska then left Shorty's in early 2006, and selected Element Skateboards as his next skateboard deck sponsor in December. Following his move to Element, Muska stated, "I am very excited about joining the Element family! I look forward to this new chapter in my skateboarding career... And you can bet on it that we are going to make some big things happen." The company officially welcomed Muska with an advertisement in 2007 that featured a photograph of Muska performing a frontside flip on a street-based transitional structure—the byline for the promotion read "Welcome To The Family".

After he left C1RCA, Muska subsequently founded the Supra footwear company in 2006 with Angel Cabada from One Distribution (owner of the KR3W apparel brand). The Supra footwear brand has been endorsed by Muska since the company's inception, and Muska's first Supra signature model—the "Skytop"—was one of the first team rider models that was released. The first Muska Supra advertisement appeared in 2006, while the inaugural official Skytop promotion appeared in 2007. Muska has designed the signature shoe models, the Skytop, "Skytop II" (2009), and "Skytop III"; a low-cut version was also released. All of the Skytop designs were created in collaboration with footwear designer Josh Brubaker and were initially perceived as outlandish by Muska's peers in the industry.

=== 2013–present: "Transitions" art show, Skytop IV, Supra Mexico store ===
In addition to introducing a new version of the Berrics indoor skateboard facility in early 2013, Muska appeared on numerous occasions as a referee for the sixth installment of the Battle at the Berrics contest series, run by The Berrics website.

Muska partnered with the New Image Arts gallery to open his first-ever solo art exhibition, titled "Transitions," in June 2013. Muska explained:

... I set up this space. It was sort of a concept space for me and just a trial thing to bring a lot of people together from skaters to photographers, to artists and designers, directors, architects – I mean all these different people in one space and I wanted to encourage creativity. There was a big 20ft wall with supplies and it was a non-stop changing graffiti wall. So anybody that came I encouraged them to paint, interact with each other, have a good time and then my work was being created there and displayed there as well and people came and saw that and asked me to do the show, and that's how it happened.

The press release for the show explained the title's origins: "The title of Chad's first show ... is a word that not only stems from the curved surfaces skateboarders ride on in pools, parks, and ramps, but it's also a reference to the skateboard lifestyle which is defined by movement from place to place, and from one state of mind to the next."

Supra expanded into Mexico in 2014, and Muska opened the brand's store in Mexico City in November/December. He designed a custom sculpture to reflect city's history—titled "El Sol, La Luna, Y Más Allá," the sculpture was installed as a permanent fixture in the store.

In 2019, Muska created the cover art for Epiphany, an EP by British electronic musician Ross from Friends.

=== Sponsors ===
As of December 2021, Muska's sponsors are Ghetto Child Wheels, Shorty's, Brooklyn Projects and Supra Footwear.

=== Influence ===
Muska was identified as the 12th most influential skateboarder of all time by Transworld SKATEboarding magazine in December 2011. In response to the matter of his influence on skateboarding, Muska stated in response:

I'd like to think that I've brought something to the table. I caused a little bit of a stir at times in the industry when I think it needed it. People can talk shit about me or they love me—I don't know what they think about me—but at least I feel I added something to the industry and I had so much fun doing it.

Professional skateboarder Tom Penny (identified as twenty-first on Transworld SKATEboarding's list) named Muska as one of the five skateboarders who have influenced skateboarding the most.

== Influences ==
After his inclusion in the "30 Most Influential Skaters of All Time" list released by Transworld SKATEboarding magazine in 2011, Muska explained that his first influences were sponsored skateboarders in his local area.

In addition to the influence that Muska has had on Penny, Muska revealed Penny's influence on his own skateboarding in 2012:

I think what was cool is that he was pushing skateboarding in a direction that I wasn't ... and I was pushing towards bigger handrails, bigger "hubbas", and, kind of, unconventional skate spots. And so I think, the two of us, kind of got psyched off each other, you know? next thing I know, he was hitting, grinding bigger handrails; I started frontside flipping over handrails, you know, like? ... And just as people, I think, like, he remains-I don't have to see the guy for ten years and we'll still be best friends ... You meet people over the years that you connect with and are inspired by, you know? And I think me and Tom were definitely a major part of coming together and helping progress skateboarding at the time ...

Muska has also identified Jamie Thomas as a major influence and described him as an individual who is readily able to identify others who are willing to work at their skateboarding diligently. Muska explained, "I'd just watch what he was doing ... he's talking and they're listening to him, you know? So I think Jamie really opened my eyes more that you could do more than just skate and get more involved with these companies, you know?"

The top five skateboarding influences, as identified by Muska in 2012, are Christian Hosoi, Natas Kaupas, Mark Gonzales, Pat Duffy, and Nyjah Huston—during the same interview, Muska admitted that "there are so many" and also named Kris Markovic and Jeremy Wray. In response to the matter of who is the all-time, "number one" influential skateboarder in history, Muska named Gonzales, further explaining:

... just still to this day. Like, I mean, just because, for me, skateboarding was never about just progression; it was about, like, the individual, and the person, and what they brought to, to skateboarding. Not many skaters could have a career as long as he has and still maintain that idea, you know? Like, still, he is skateboarding; that is, everything, is Mark—it's freedom; it's not caring about anything; it's about going on your board and enjoying yourself; pushing yourself physically, mentally, and having as much fun as you can possibly have. That's what skateboarding is and that's what Mark is.

Muska has named a variety of influences in regard to his shoe design work, such as Louis Vuitton and the Nike "Jordan" range, further explaining that he has attempted to merge the aesthetics of the fashion and sneaker cultures. In an interview to promote the third Skytop model, Muska elaborated on his future direction:

Personally design-wise, I'm definitely all over the place and I'm thinking of so many new and exciting designs, but it's hard for me to find places to sell a lot of the stuff, because it will be too crazy for what the shops want, especially on the skateboarding side ... I mean, the same thing happened with the Skytop I and eventually all the shops that thought it was horrible and said they would never wear it couldn't deny the fact that people wanted this product ... I think it's time for the world to define a new style and a new chapter and go ahead.

== Entrepreneur ==
In 1997, Muska founded the skateboard wheel brand Ghetto Child. Started as a friendship between Chad Muska, Tom Penny and Sean Sheffey, Ghetto Child went on to sponsor some of today's most relevant skateboarders. In 2004, Ghetto Child went on a hiatus, ceasing distribution. In 2016, Bryan Herman and Braydon Szafranski collaborated with Muska to relaunch the brand.

In 2008, Muska opened the store "Factory413" in Los Angeles, with business partner Cabada; The retail outlet is described on the store's website as "a hub for avant-garde Los Angeles brands and a creative outlet for both founders."

Muska has released signature products using the "Factory413" name, such as sunglasses in 2010 and shoe collaboration with Supra in late 2012.

== Video games ==
Muska is a playable character in the Tony Hawk's video game series, from Tony Hawk's Pro Skater to Tony Hawk's Underground 2. Muska later reprised his role in Tony Hawk's Pro Skater 1 + 2, a remake of the first two entries in the Tony Hawk's series.

== Music ==
Muska's music has been released under the alias "Muskabeatz" and he has produced music for old-school hip hop artists, such as Afrika Bambaataa, Biz Markie, MC Lyte, Guru, Melle Mel, Ice-T, Jeru the Damaja, and KRS-One, as well as Wu-Tang Clan members Raekwon and U-God. For his debut release, Muska had planned to produce a drum 'n' bass record, but he decided during the recording process that the album should have an "old-school feel" to it—the self-titled Muskabeatz record was released on February 13, 2003 on Muska's own 1212 Records.

== Personal life ==
Following his move to Mission Beach as an adolescent, Muska was mostly homeless and spent a significant period of time sleeping on the beach; in 2012, Muska explained: "I had nothing and those were, I can still say, by far, the happiest days of my life. Happiest beyond, craziest times, test, gnarliest adventures, everything, you know?" As of 2012, Muska resided in Hollywood, California.

Muska filmed a "Footnotes" segment for the Berrics website, in which he revealed his love of footwear, including his personal collection of footwear and models that he has designed. During the interview for the segment, Muska clarified, "I'm not, like, that 'sneaker collector guy' where, like, I buy one of each just to, like, save 'em and have 'em; when I like sneakers I like to get 'em and use them more, and wear 'em."

On July 14, 2011, Muska was arrested for "felony vandalism" on Hollywood Boulevard in Los Angeles, California.

In 2021, Muska returned to his native Ohio to build and manage a farm. He also provided design consultation in the building of a new skatepark in the town of Lorain.

== Videography ==
- Maple: Rites of Passage (1994)
- Etnies: High 5 (1995)
- 411VM: Best of 411, Volume 2 (1995)
- 411VM: Issue 11 (1995)
- Transworld: Uno (1996)
- Church of Skatan: Wild in the Streets (1998)
- Shorty's: Fulfill the Dream (1998)
- Genie of the Lamp (1998)
- 411VM: Vancouver 1999 (1999)
- Transworld: Feedback (1999)
- Digital #3 (2000)
- Transworld: Anthology (2000)
- TSA: Life in the Fast Lane (2001)
- Collage (2001)
- Shorty's: Guilty (2001)
- Transworld: Videoradio (2002)
- 411VM: Good As Gold 50 (2002)
- ON Video: Summer 2002 (2002)
- Shorty's: T-Stance Holmes (2003)
- 411VM: Issue 58 (2003)
- The Death Squad: Oklahomies (2003)
- ON Video: Summer 2003 (2003)
- Shortys: How to Go Pro (2005)
- Strange Notes: Covers, Baby! (2007)
- Element: This is My Element (2007)
- Streets: LA (2007)
- Supra: European Tour (2011)

The 1996 Toy Machine video Welcome to Hell features a bonus part from Muska that was edited to a song by Nappy Roots called "Right Now".
