= Antwuan Dixon =

American professional skateboarder (born 1988)

Personal information
- Full name: Antwuan Willis Dixon
- Born: August 19, 1988 (age 37) Victorville, California, U.S.
- Home town: Carson, California, U.S.
- Education: Fontana High School
- Height: 6 ft 0 in (183 cm)

Antwuan Willis Dixon (born August 19, 1988) is an American professional skateboarder.

== Skateboarding career ==
=== Early life ===
Dixon started skateboarding at the age of twelve, when his mom ordered a Powell Peralta deck from CCS. In addition to the complete, Dixon ordered a skate video VHS: 411 Video Magazine - Issue 40.

=== Sponsorships ===
Dixon's first sponsorship was getting boards from Transitions skateboards. After Transitions, Dixon received boards from Chocolate Skateboards and Youngguns Skateboards. At Carson skatepark, Mark Waters saw Dixon skating. This led to Dixon getting on eS.

==== Baker 3 ====
In 2005, Dixon released his first video part in the critically acclaimed Baker 3. Dixon filmed the entire part over 3 months. Dixon was 16 when the video was released.

Dixon was alternately featured in the Baker Skateboards video Baker Has a Deathwish, then rode for Deathwish skateboards. Eventually, Dixon and Deathwish parted ways. After eS, Dixon was sponsored by Supra footwear. In 2009, Dixon got his first pro shoe from Supra.

Antwuan's current sponsors include: FTP Skateboards, Hardluck MFG, Straye Shoes, Thunder Trucks, Brooklyn Projects, Hearts and Hammers, and Transitions Skateshop.

=== Legal issues ===
On March 22, 2008, Dixon was arrested by Tampa police on charges stemming from possession of marijuana (less than 20 grams) and cocaine with the intent to sell, as well as the battery of three law enforcement officers. Dixon was irrevocably held on $4,000 bond, which was subsequently paid for his immediate release.

In an interview for Skateboardermag, Dixon spoke on the incident:

Ah, man, some crazy shit happened at Tampa! I was just over there chilling, smoking, and I'm chilling outside paying for that tatoo [sic] dude and this girl to get in. Then, all of a sudden, this girl's like, "Antwuan, you wanna go smoke?" So we go and we're about to smoke these blunts, then this truck rolls up and it's undercover cops. They just jumped out. Then, this lady had seen I had a big-ass bag of weed and shit. She'd seen my money and thought I was a drug dealer from out there. They were talking about seizing my money, and I was like, "I don't know what that means," and they're, like, "We're basically gonna take your money when we leave here," and I'm, like, "Hell no!" I'm sitting there being handcuffed and shit, so I got up and grabbed my wallet and then I held it. Then me and the cops started fighting for a little bit I guess. I don't know, I was pretty faded. I don't remember. Next thing you know, I end up in jail in Florida with all these batteries against police officers. Now I got to go to court and stuff all the time.

In 2013, Dixon received a three year jail sentence after violating his probation, and was charged with battery, vandalism, and child endangerment after an argument at a convenience store escalated to violence. Dixon gave details in an interview with Thrasher magazine during his jail sentence:

Why am I in jail? Ah, man, for violating a three-year joint suspension. They gave me three years. The original case was, some fool at 7-11 being racist, I socked him a couple times. Spit in his face and he's still talking shit. Walking outside, boom, boom, boom. I bought what I was going to buy and go outside. Mind you, this dude had kids with him. He put his kids in the car. I'm a little faded or whatever, so I don't give a fuck. He keeps talking shit so I grab my board and start breaking his windows of his car. And his kids are in the car so they gave me battery, five counts of battery, vandalism and child endangerment. So you know, I violated the probation I was offered in this case. I had a three-year joint suspension, which is why I'm here now.

Dixon served his sentence and is now living in Los Angeles.

On September 13, 2016, Dixon was taken back into custody. Dixon was released sometime in November or December 2016.
