= Radlands (skatepark) =

Skatepark in Northampton, England (1992–2004)

Coordinates: 52.255°N 0.902°W

Radlands was a skate park situated in Northampton, England. It was constructed in 1992 by the Ince family (Chris and his sons Dee and Stee) in a former warehouse and was the first ever indoor skate park built in Britain. The 10,000 sq ft (930 m^{2}) park was, before its closure, one of the largest in Britain. The owners claim that over 250,000 people used the park in its 12 years of operation. It was closed on 10 October 2004 due to being unprofitable, despite a campaign by local councillors on Northampton Borough Council to save it.

In 2009, the Liberal Democrat administration at Northampton Borough Council, working with Northampton Skate Park Action Group, started to investigate how a new skate park of national significance might be built in Northampton. In 2011, the Liberal Democrats pledged £250,000 towards the build costs. Despite the change of political leadership at the council in May 2011, the project was able to continue. Wheelscape were selected as the preferred contractor. and Northampton Radlands Plaza was opened at Midsummer Meadow, Bedford Road, Northampton on 21 July 2012. The park was referred to as one of the UK's best five skateparks by British skateboarder Lucy Adams in an interview with The Guardian in August 2014.
