= Riley Hawk =

American skateboarder (born 1992)

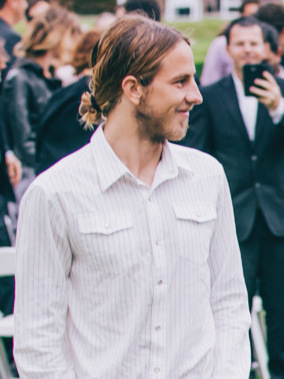
- Hawk in 2015

Personal information
- Born: Hudson Riley Hawk; December 6, 1992 (age 33) Carlsbad, California, U.S.
- Occupation: Professional skateboarder
- Years active: 2013–present
- Spouse: Frances Bean Cobain (m. 2023)
- Children: 1
- Parent: Tony Hawk (father)
- Relatives: Spencer Hawk (sibling); Courtney Love (mother-in-law); Kurt Cobain (father-in-law, d. 1994)

Sport
- Country: United States
- Sport: Skateboarding
- Turned pro: 2013

Hudson Riley Hawk (born December 6, 1992) is an American professional skateboarder and singer. He is the son of skateboarder Tony Hawk.

== Early life ==
Hawk was born on December 6, 1992, in Carlsbad, California. He began skateboarding at age 3, assisted by his father. By age 8, he could already do shove-its, kickflips, heelflips, boardslides and 50-50's.

As a child, Hawk performed skateboard stunts for the film Max Keeble's Big Move (2001). In 2017, Hawk and his father both featured on an episode of the TV series Trailer Park Boys: Out of the Park (Season 2, Episode 8 "Los Angeles Pt.2").

== Career ==
=== Skateboarding ===
Unlike his father, who is known for his vert style, Hawk is better known as a street skater. He turned pro on his 21st birthday in December 2013 and became Skateboarder magazine's 2013 Amateur of the Year on the same day. He is sponsored by Baker and Lakai.

Hawk is featured in the Tony Hawk's video game series, appearing in Tony Hawk's Pro Skater HD, Tony Hawk's Pro Skater 5, Tony Hawk's Pro Skater 1 + 2 and Tony Hawk's Pro Skater 3 + 4.

=== Music ===
Hawk is a music enthusiast. He has played music for several years in local San Diego bands and began collecting vinyl records at age 15. As of April 2022, Hawk was the frontman of punk band Warish, then signed with Riding Easy Records.

=== Business ventures ===
In 2019, Hawk opened a coffee shop, Steel Mill Coffee & Records, in San Diego County which he co-owned and operated with friends. The shop went out of business in May 2023.

== Personal life ==
Since early 2021, Hawk has been in a relationship with Frances Bean Cobain, daughter of late Nirvana frontman Kurt Cobain and Hole frontwoman Courtney Love. The couple married on October 7, 2023, in Los Angeles, in a ceremony officiated by former R.E.M. frontman Michael Stipe, Cobain's godfather. The couple had a son on September 17, 2024.

Hawk is a practitioner of Brazilian jiu-jitsu and has achieved the rank of blue belt.
