= Tom Penny =

British skateboarder (born 1977)

Personal information
- Born: 13 April 1977 (age 49) Dorchester, Dorset, England
- Home town: Oxford, England
- Education: Dragon School

Tom Penny (born 13 April 1977) is a professional skateboarder from Abingdon, United Kingdom. As of January 2013, Penny is sponsored by the Flip skateboard deck brand and his Cheech & Chong signature deck is one of the brand's highest-selling deck products.

== Early life ==
Penny was born in Abingdon, England, and grew up skateboarding in Oxford, England. He attended the Dragon School. Penny has described his early years skateboarding in Oxford:

When I first started skateboarding in Oxford, England, there were not so many skateboarders—there were just a few skateboarders that I grew up with. There were no magazines, no skate shop, and we had no vision of the outside world of skateboarding; so, people who influenced me when I was younger, growing up, would be the friends that I grew up skateboarding with: Justin Parker, Erin Chalice, Pete Crucioli and Thomas Kilpatrick.

== Professional skateboarding ==
Penny was spotted by Oxford local pro and SS20 co-owner Sean Goff and added to the SS20 shop team. He quickly gained coverage in UK skate magazines, including RAD and Skateboard!, and was featured in videos such as Rollersnakes 540 and 720.

=== Deathbox ===
Following the initial coverage that Penny received, he was soon added to the Deathbox Skateboards team by owner Jeremy Fox (Deathbox was later merged with Bash Skateboards and was re-branded as "Flip"). In 1993 Penny appeared in the inaugural Flip video The Long Overdue, alongside Geoff Rowley, Alex Moul, Andy Scott and Rune Glifberg—the video was made by Goff.

In 1993 Penny made his first international video appearance in 411VM's "Issue 2" and was featured in a "Wheels of Fortune" segment—Penny was 16 years of age and the segment features footage from the Radlands Skatepark in Northampton, UK. At the age of 16 years, Penny was sponsored by Flip, Independent, Droors, Union and SS20.

=== United States relocation ===
In late 1994, Flip left UK shores and relocated to Huntington Beach, California, US, the "heart" of world skateboarding. Along with other team members, Rowley, Scott and Glifberg, Penny exerted a significant impact on the skateboarding sub-culture with his small part in the Flip industry section in 411VM's "Issue 11"; his switch frontside flip at the Carlsbad Gap; and a five-trick downhill run that ended in a backside tailslide on a nine-stair handrail. By the end of 1995, Penny had received acclaim from notable professional skateboarders, such as Tony Hawk.

During his time in the US, Penny released video parts in the mid-1990s, such as Etnies' Hi-Five, Transworld Skateboarding's Uno, TSA's Life in the Fast Lane, Balance in the World of Chaos and Dope Clothing's Time for Tea. During this period, Penny also received his first cover photograph for Transworld, in which he is performing a frontside bluntslide in Huntington Beach. Skin Phillips, Transworld's former editor-in-chief, stated: "The other thing with Tom and really all the Flip guys when they came over was that they were absolutely unfazed by contests or demos. That’s just what they grew up skating."

During the early 2000s, Penny reappeared in Flip's videos, Sorry, Really Sorry and Extremely Sorry.

In 2023, Penny was inducted into the Skateboarding Hall of Fame, which is in the U.S.

=== Sponsors ===
As of 2021, Penny is sponsored by:

- Flip Skateboards
- éS Footwear
- Ghetto Child Wheels
- Mosaic Bearings

== Skateboarding influences ==
In a 2012 interview, Penny identified the five skateboarders that have been the most influential throughout his career: Daewon Song, Rodney Mullen, Danny Way, Chad Muska and Steve Caballero. He also acknowledged contemporary influences, such as Quim Cardona, Paulo Diaz and Sean Sheffey—"People that are slightly interesting; make it more fun; make it more enjoyable; more original skateboarders; stylish skateboarders".

== Influence ==
Professional skateboarder Chad Muska, has explained his experience of skateboarding with Tom Penny in the 1990s:

That was pretty much the craziest part of it all. It was almost like he didn't know he was doing anything special. None of it was conscious. Nothing he's done has been conscious [laughs]. It's just all-natural. His whole life is like that ... Anywhere you went he would just bust something—no cameras, nothing. None of it was ever planned in any way. It was never like, "I'm gonna do this and I'll get this cover and be a superstar." It was just, "Oh, there's an obstacle in front of me and I want to do this down it." Boom. "I'm just doing it."

Geoff Rowley and Andrew Reynolds are two other professional skateboarders (both are also company owners) who have also publicly praised Penny and Reynolds has described the filming of Penny's footage for the Etnies High Five video:

Oh man. The switch flip. It’s unexplainable. That whole thing is just like the Penny package. It’s like a display. Not many people have got kickflip, frontside flip, switch frontside flip, and switch flip all looking exactly the same. It wasn’t even really that common to do tricks over handrails at that point. He just killed it.

In December 2011, Penny was identified as the twenty-first most influential skateboarder of all time by Transworld Skateboarding magazine; however, Phillips had first revealed his perspective on Penny in 2009:

That was just sort of the way Penny was. He was nonchalant. He sort of didn’t realise—I don’t think he’s ever realised the impact he’s had on skateboarding. He never thought about it. Everything was just natural. Were his lines thought out before? Probably to an extent based on what he’d been doing in practice. But none of it was premeditated like, "Right, I’m gonna do this here, then hit the hip, then hit the pyramid". It was just flow.

Transworld then introduced Penny's 2012 interview for the "Most Influential" series with the following blurb: "Tom Penny changed everything that came before him. Tom’s technique, on any terrain, was so fluid and nonchalant that within six months of his arrival on US soil back in '94, every pro on the planet wanted to skate like him."

In July 2013, professional skateboarder Paul Rodriguez identified Penny in his "top ten" list of professional skateboarders, explaining that "Tom to me was like a mythical figure ... To me his style was my favorite in skateboarding just the way moves, the way he did his tricks, it looked so lazy and so buttery."

== Contest history ==
Penny made his debut at the 1993 UK Championships Contest at Radlands, where he came 3rd—US skateboarder, Willy Santos, won the contest.

Penny returned to Radlands in 1994 for the UK Championships and finished in 6th place; US contestant, Mike Santarossa, won the contest.

Penny won the 1995 Radlands UK Championships Contest, which had evolved into one of the world's biggest contests. Penny beat over 100 other competitors, including over 75 US professionals, including Ray Barbee, Hawk, Bob Burnquist, Andrew Reynolds, Ed Templeton, Eric Koston, Phil Shao (now deceased) and Jamie Thomas.

== Videography ==
- Rollersnakes "720" (1992)
- Flip: The Long Overdue (unofficial) (1993)
- 411VM: Issue 2 – "Wheels of Fortune" (1993)
- Hook-Ups: Asian Goddess (1994)
- ATM: Come Together (1995)
- etnies: Hi-5 (1995)
- 411VM: Issue 11 – "Flip Skateboards Industry Section" (1995)
- TSA: "Life in the Fast Lane" (1996)
- Transworld: Uno (1996)
- Dope Clothing: Time for Tea (1996)
- Genie of the Lamp (1998)
- Landspeed: CKY (1999)
- éS: Menikmati (2000)
- Transworld: Anthology (2000)
- Collage (2001)
- TSA: Life in the Fast Lane (re-release) (2001)
- Flip: Sorry (2002)
- Transworld: Videoradio (2002)
- éS: Germany Tour (2002)
- éS: Europe Tour (2003)
- Flip: Really Sorry (2003)
- Flip: Feast Tours (2006)
- Flip: Extremely Sorry (2009)
- Supra: European Tour (2011)
- Skate Sauce: Hard Times But Good Times (2012)
