= Flip Skateboards =

US-based international skateboard company

- Industry: Skateboarding
- Founded: England 1991
- Headquarters: California
- Key people: Rune Glifberg; Tom Penny; Arto Saari; Jeremy Fox; Ian Deacon; Geoff Rowley
- Website: www.flipskateboards.com

Flip Skateboards is a United States–based international skateboard company, co-owned by Jeremy Fox and Ian Deacon. The company produces skateboard hard goods (decks, wheels, bearings, completes, and hardware), soft goods (T-shirts, tops, sweatshirts, hats, beanies, and socks), DVDs, and accessories. The brand was distributed globally by US company NHS Inc. but has since parted with the distribution. Starting in July 2017, the brand is distributed in Europe by HLC and has now taken over global distribution.

== History ==
=== Deathbox ===
Deathbox Skateboards was started in 1987 in the UK by Graham McEachran, Jeremy Fox and Duncan Houlton. Tom Penny, Rune Glifberg, Andy Scott and Geoff Rowley joined the company while this name still existed.

=== Relocation to the US ===
Flip moved from the United Kingdom (UK) to California, US in July 1994. Jeremy Fox, Ian Deacon and Geoff Rowley arrived in the US first, followed by team riders Tom Penny and Rune Glifberg in the following year. At the time of the relocation, the team consisted of four professional riders: Penny, Rowley, Glifberg and Andy Scott. The company and its riders received significant support from professional skateboarder Ed Templeton, who owned his own company, Toy Machine. Rowley stated that Templeton and his company "opened their arms to us, gave us local support, and had our back. Any ignorance was small and only served to make us stronger…..and faster!!!" Despite the brand's foundation in the US, in 2006 Rowley stated:

All the company owners are still British citizens, one runs a large percentage of our workday directly from England for the last five years, I would say that makes us British until death. People can consider us whatever they want but saying untrue negative things regarding these matters is just downright childish. The things Flip/Deathbox did for England and the English skate scene should not be sneered at ... there is no other way to get to the level we are at, without first accepting where skateboarding was born from, and respecting that all the mags are driven from here also, it is hard to gain friends if you aren't visible.

A European based company cannot and will not be accepted across the whole of the USA unless they embrace those areas and live them, Flip is strong worldwide for this reason, plus running a business of this nature isn't viable based in England, too costly.

Reflecting upon the company's move to the US:

We were a totally new company moving to a foreign country, and I don't think we kind of expected it to go "boom", and just fly right in. We had no expectations; we didn't really know that many people, and we actually just wanted to skate, really. Because we grew up dreaming of living in California and getting to wake up every day and go out and skate without it raining, and I think that was something that, like, all of the guys, when we first moved here, you know, Rune [Glifberg] and Tom [Penny], that was something that, you couldn't hold us back in that respect. I'd just turned eighteen, Tom was seventeen, neither of us had lived away from home, you know. We'd moved to a foreign country where we didn't know anybody. Nobody. We had no money, we didn't have any cars, alls we had was the board that we had; we couldn't go breaking those. we couldn't afford to, at the time, starting a company, we couldn't afford to run through ten boards a month ... Like myself, personally, I skated a lot with Ed [Templeton], like, every day, because he lived, like, right across the road from me.

=== Team departures ===
In what was perceived as a shocking decision by the global skateboard community, long-time team rider Arto Saari announced his decision to leave Flip in 2008. In an interview with skateboard journalist Chris Nieratko following his decision (Saari later contacted Nieratko to prevent the interview from being published and the journalist published it on his personal website instead), Saari explained the process of leaving Flip:

It was really heavy but they [Flip] took it pretty good. I thought they were going to come and chop my legs off but they were very reasonable about it but it's been a heavy process. It's been on good terms. I just felt like I had to move on. I changed all my other sponsors, I might as well. Why stop now? New knee, new liver, new shoe company, new board sponsor ... Yeah, I did shed a few tears. It's like getting a divorce; even though I've never been married other than Flip. I can imagine it's something like that. There's parts that you like but there's parts that you just want to move on past. It's really hard to deal with. You wonder, 'Are you going to lose friends? Are you going to lose business?' It was a tough decision to make and I'm still spun out about it. I can't believe that it's all happening but I think it will be for the better for everyone ... I just couldn't take it any longer. I couldn't take the madness and I thought it would be better to move on than to stay somewhere where I don't think I necessarily belong anymore. Things have changed a lot over the years and I thought it would be better to explore something new, to be like a little kid in a candy store.

In the Nieratko interview, Saari also discussed Rowley's response to his decision:

"Don't do it." He knew it had to happen. We're still cool. He understands. He's like, "Go do your thing. Go skate around." It was a very, very emotional, gnarly thing. It's been so many years in the same boat you have to start going in different ways. Sometimes the ship gets too small, too many egos, you got to jump overboard and catch the next one and see where that takes you.

In 2012, Saari provided further insight into his decision to leave Flip, citing the death of former teammate Shane Cross as a significant underpinning factor: "It wasn't, like, a easy thing to do, but, at the time, I knew I had to do it ... for the reasons that happened, you know? And that's why I decided that it's better off for me to leave Flip than, just, go my own way and, just, do that." Professional skateboarder Ed Templeton stated in a 2012 interview: "I mean I was completely shocked when he left Flip ... it didn't make sense."

At the start of January 2011, Flip announced that Saari had rejoined the team and released an image that featured Saari alongside the caption "Home is Where the Hearto Is". A video segment was also published on the website of Thrasher magazine and featured Rowley, Saari and Thrasher editor-in-chief, Jake Phelps, discussing the decision in Phelps' office in San Francisco, US. Saari explained to Phelps that Flip is like "family" and stated "You can take a man out of Flip, but you can't take the Flip out the man".

In 2012, Fox disclosed the process of re-recruiting Saari:

I went up and saw him with Geoff, one day, because it seemed like he really ... well, I could tell; we could all tell that he wanted to be back on the team. Arto's not a very pushy person, at all. Never the guy who will ask for anything, and I just said to Geoff one day, "Let's just, we need to drive up there and then, and just put him back on the team. Make him put himself back on; because, otherwise, this is never going to happen." Maybe he'd grown up and realized that it might be a little dysfunctional family, but it is my family.

Also in 2012, Saari has stated:

It was a pretty unspoken thing. It wasn't until the last minute that, it was like, "You wanna get back on?" I was like, "Yeah". Those are the guys who brought me up, backed me up. And I was, like, "You know what? I gotta, I gotta get back on."

Established team rider Mark Appleyard left Flip to join Element Skateboards in October 2010. In an October 2010 interview, Appleyard explained his decision:

I was over it [laughs]. I feel like I grew out of it and the team changed so much over the years that I was just like, "this shit ain't for me anymore," and I just needed to feel more stoked on the company I ride for, so I had to change it up ... Yeah it was hard to leave, but it's a business move. Ya know? If someone's gonna be your friend, it shouldn't depend on what company you ride for. I just had to make a power move to benefit myself. I'm really stoked on the choice I made. It was difficult but it had to be done ... I mean, I had a lot of options and I just figured that Element best suits my vibe. It's just a nice company and kinda earthy and nature-y and stuff. I just felt like, "Damn that's where I wana be." And then I met up with the guys and they were really cool and we just clicked. I'm down–it's sick.

In December 2010, another established team member, Rodrigo Teixeira, also announced his departure from Flip and the official statement from the company read: "Everyone at Flip would like to thank Rodrigo for all the good times and wish him all the best for the future." Teixeira subsequently joined the roster of skateboard deck company Dirty Ghetto Kids (DGK) and explained his decision in a January 2011 interview: "I feel like it was time for me to make a move and do what I wanted to do. With DGK we are into the same things. We can all kick it and skate at the same spot. It's just more who I am."

In October 2015 Geoff Rowley left flip.

=== 2010 onward ===
Following his appearance in the Extremely Sorry video, English skateboarder Ben Nordberg—originally from Bath, Somerset—released his first ever full-length video part for the company in May 2012. Team riders Louie Lopez and Curren Caples were assigned professional status in late September 2013—professional surfer Kelly Slater presented Caples with his first professional skateboard deck model, while Lopez received his first model at a piñata party. Alex Majerus was assigned professional status in early July 2014 and a surprise party was held; Although Rowley could not be present, he spoke with Majerus by telephone during the event.

The 3 Flip video project was published on the TransWorld SKATEboarding website on July 21, 2014. Directed and filmed by Saar1, with the assistance of Josh Zucker, the video features Caples, Lopez and Majerus, and was filmed over a period of three months.

== Cheech and Chong graphic ==
In 2012 — it was initially released in the 90s — Flip released an advertisement entitled "Legalized!", referring to the official licensing that the company had secured for a Cheech & Chong (comedy duo, Cheech Marin and Tommy Chong) graphic that had been used, thus far, for a Penny signature model. Rowley explained in 2009:

Tom loved Cheech and Chong for obvious reasons. He's had a bunch of rad ones that he's brought to Flip. But that one, along with the mushroom board, is probably the most iconic. We winged it at first, then eventually they found out. Cheech Marin was rad enough to continue letting us make the board as long as he got some royalties. So we actually still pay him on a monthly basis. Cheech Marin has been on the Flip payroll since 2000.

The text in the 2012 advertisement read: "The officially approved (and legally licensed this time!) Cheech and Chong Tom Penny boards are back.", and in 2009, Rowley stated, "It came out in '96 and is still one of our best-selling boards today."

== Awards ==
Five team members (former and current) have won the Thrasher Skater of the Year Award: Bob Burnquist in 1997 (he was sponsored by Anti-Hero at the time), Geoff Rowley in 2000, Arto Saari in 2001, Mark Appleyard in 2003 (Appleyard also won Best Street Skater at the 2007 Transworld Skateboarding awards), and David González in 2012.

In responses to questions about how it felt to win the Thrasher accolade, Rowley stated, "Fucking weird, though it was flattering!", Saari stated, "I never thought it would actually like ... whatever, happen to me, or what not. Like, it's just one of those things that's just come out of the blue, you know?", and González exclaimed, "You don't even know how fucking stoked I am dude!"

== Contest history ==
In 2012, Luan Oliveira won the Maloof Money Cup in South Africa, while Burnquist placed second in the "Vert" category. Oliveira is also part of the Street League Skateboarding contest roster.

Amateur rider Alec Majerus achieved first place in the 2012 Tampa Am contest, held at the Skatepark of Tampa skate park in Tampa, Florida, US—Majerus competed against 300 other amateur skateboarders to win the prize.

== Skate team ==
=== Pro ===
- Bob Burnquist
- Rune Glifberg
- Lance Mountain
- Tom Penny
- Luan de Oliveira
- David González
- Arto Saari
- Denny Pham
- Lucas Rebelo

=== Former ===
- Danny Cerezini
- Bastien Salabanzi
- PJ Ladd (Plan B)
- Shane Cross (Deceased)
- Alex Chalmers
- Rodrigo Teixeira
- Mark Appleyard
- Luan Oliveira
- Andrew Langi
- Greyson Fletcher
- Ali Boulala (Retired Injured)
- Geoff Rowley
- Curren Caples
- Andy Scott
- Andrew Gordon
- Oscar Meza
- Christoph "Willow" Wildgrube
- Alex Moul
- Carl Shipman
- Louie Lopez
- Keegan Palmer
- Eric Fletcher
- Marcos Montoya
- Ben Nordberg
- Matt Berger
- Alec Majerus (Arbor)

=== Amateur ===
- Alexander Risvad (International)
- Art Cordova
- Sanggoe Dharma Tanjung
- Cory Juneau
- Raimu Sasaki
- Basral Graito
- Liz Akama
- Diggs English
- Yuzuki Kawasaki

== Videography ==
- The Long Overdue (1992) – unofficial promotional video

Features Penny, Rowley, Andy Scott, Glifberg and Moul.

- Sorry (2002)

Features Appleyard, Boulala, Chalmers, Glifberg, Penny, Rowley, Saari and Salabanzi.

- Really Sorry (2003)

Features Appleyard, Boulala, Danilo Cerezini, Ladd, Penny, Rowley, Saari and Salabanzi.

- Feast Tours (2006)

Features Eric Fletcher, Boulala, Gonzales, Lopez, Rowley, Mountain, Saari, Burnquist, Appleyard, Tx, Cross and Penny.

- Extremely Sorry (2009)

Features Boulala, Gonzalez, Penny, Appleyard, de Oliveira, Lopez, Christoph "Willow" Wildgrube, Nordberg, Cross, Glifberg, Rowley, Caples, Tx, Mountain and Burnquist. A soundtrack album, produced by Baron, was issued by Volcom Entertainment.

- The Weight of the World (2012) – eight-minute promotional video

Features Majerus, Nordberg, Caples, Gonzalez, Rowley, Fletcher, Lopez, Oliveira, Berger, Meza and Sebastian Gonzalez.

During 2012, three full video parts from Flip riders, Gonzalez, Nordberg and Meza, were released. Gonzalez' video, entitled "Possessed to Skate", was released collaboratively with Thrasher magazine; Nordberg's part was released in May 2012; and Meza's part, entitled "Let it Ride", signified his introduction to the Flip team.

- Flip Tour Video - for Thrasher Magazine (2021)

Featuring Tom Penny, Arto Saari, Rune Glifberg, Luan Oliveira, David Gonzalez, Denny Pham, Alexander Risvad & Art Cordova touring through Spain.

- Cory Juneau UNLEASHED - Welcome to Flip (2021)

Welcome video announcing Corey Juneau to the Flip team.

- Sanggoe Dharma | MATA HARIMAU (2022)

Features Sanggoe Dharma Tanjung

- Raimu Sasaki - Welcome to Flip (2022)

Welcome video announcing Raimu Sasaki to the Flip team.

- Art Cordova "Espada" - Flip part for Thrasher Magazine (2022)

Featuring Art Cordova.

- Flip "EUROSCHNITZEL" Tour - Flip tour video (2023)

Featuring Tom Penny, Rune Glifberg, Luan Oliveira, Alec Majerus, Cory Juneau, Art Cordova, Raimu Sasaki, Alexander Risvad. With special appearance's from Sami Harithi, & Logan Mosey.

- Diggs English - Welcome to Flip (2023)

Welcome video announcing Diggs English with guest tricks from Lance Mountain.

- Yuzuki Kawasaki - Welcome to Flip (2023)

Welcome video announcing Yuzuki Kawasaki.

- Basral Graito - Welcome to Flip (2023)

Welcome video announcing Basral Graito with guest tricks from Art Cordova & Raimu Sasaki.
