= Dustin Dollin =

Australian professional skateboarder

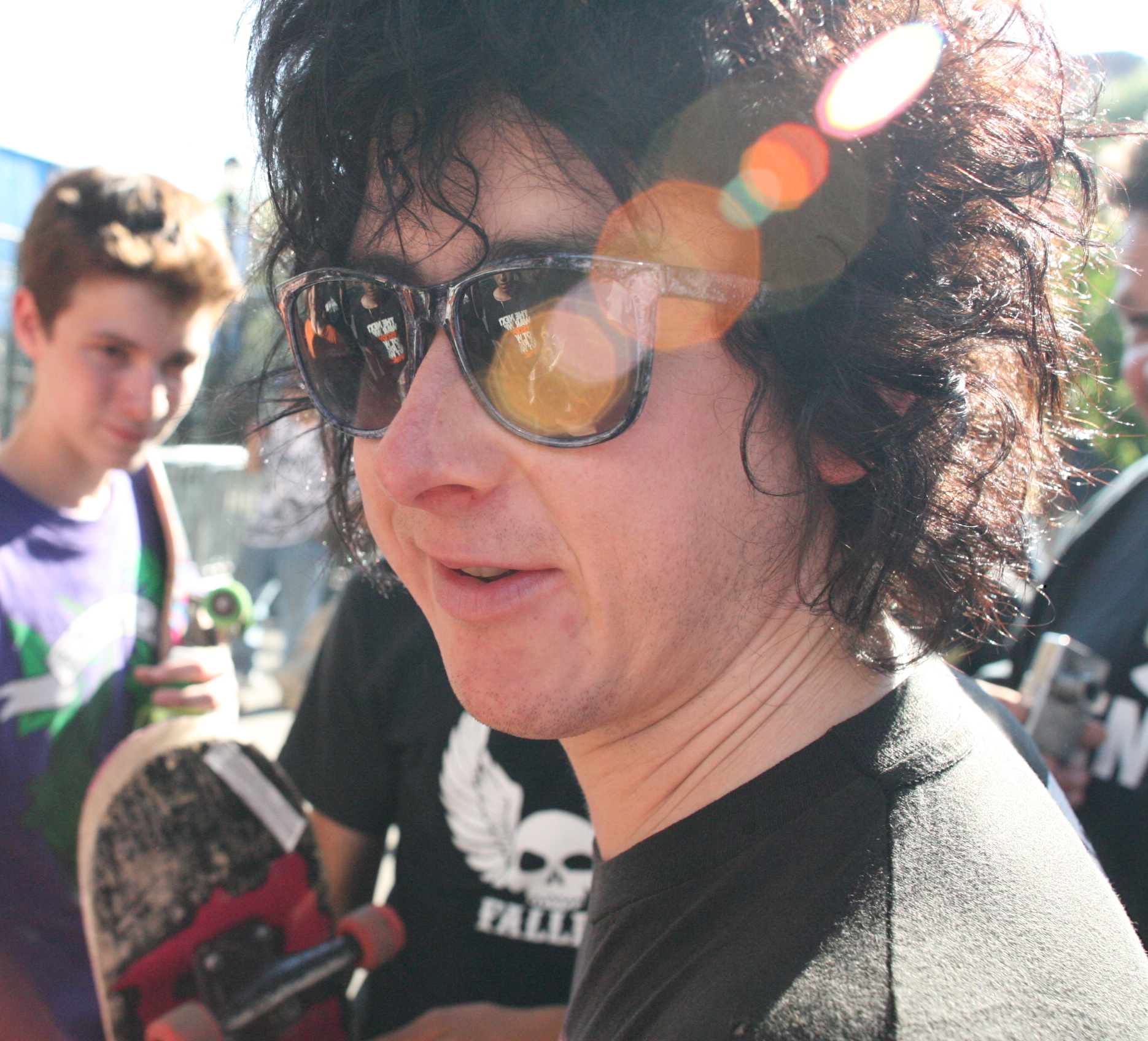
- Dollin in 2007

Personal information
- Born: 26 June 1980 (age 46) Ballina, New South Wales, Australia
- Occupation: Skateboarder
- Years active: 1997–present

Sport
- Country: Australia
- Sport: Skateboarding
- Turned pro: 1999

Dustin Dollin (born 26 June 1980) is an Australian professional skateboarder who is one of the original team riders for Baker Skateboards

== Early life ==
Dollin was born in Ballina, New South Wales, Australia, and raised in Katoomba, New South Wales. In a 2006 interview, Dollin stated in relation to his place of origin:

"Growing up is growing up. It doesn't really matter where you are because you don't really know any better when you're a kid. I knew I was poor, but that again just teaches you how to swindle money. Also, where I grew up is one of the most beautiful places in the world. And I would know; I've been everywhere."

In a 2008 interview, Dollin explained that he hates returning to Katoomba because "too many old friends are junkies."

== Professional skateboarding ==
Following Dollin's appearance at the Tampa Am contest, the Stereo skateboard brand agreed to recruit him to its "flow" program. Former professional skateboarder Danny Gonzales recalled thinking at the time: "At 17 the dude was already a wastoid. Later that night when we bar hopped, I kept either seeing or hearing him yelling and screaming for not getting into the bars. I thought, god, this kid’s fuckin’ crazy."

Dollin was asked to ride for the Vans footwear company in 1999 and has identified John Cardiel as his favorite Vans team member. However, in a 2013 interview, Dollin referred to the Vans team as a "family" and declined to nominate a favourite rider.

=== Sponsors ===
As of September 2025, Dollin's sponsors are Baker Skateboards, Spitfire wheels, Independent Truck Company, HRS shoes, Happy Hour Sunglasses, Psockadelic and Shake Junt.

== Video game appearances ==
Dollin is featured in the Tony Hawk video games Tony Hawk's Project 8, Tony Hawk's Proving Ground, and Tony Hawk: Ride.

== Personal life ==
Dollin has been married and divorced twice.

He has a distribution company out of Australia with his friend Ben Mitchell named PD DIST, that helps out Australian and NZ riders. PD Dist carries: Baker Skateboards, Deathwish, Heroin, Vol 4, Happy Hour, Psockadelic and Shake Junt.

== Videography ==
- Volcom — Freedom Wig (1997)
- Deluxe — Gnarcotica: Great Lakes Tour (1998)
- Baker — Bootleg (1998)
- Deluxe — World Wide Distribution (1999)
- 411VM - Issue 36 (1998)
- Baker — Baker2G (2000)
- ON Video - Fall 2000 (2000)
- Transworld — Sight Unseen (2001)
- Thrasher — King of the Road (2003)
- ON Video — Winter 2003 (2003)
- Volcom — Chichagof (2004)
- Streets: Melbourne (2005)
- Vans — Pleased to Meet You (2005)
- Shake Junt (2006)
- Baker — Baker 3 (2005)
- Ruthless (2007)
- Volcom — Let's Live (2007)
- Baker/Deathwish - "Baker Has A Deathwish" (2008)
- Baker/Deathwish — Baker Has a Deathwish Summer Tour (2009)
- Shake Junt — Chicken Bone Nowison (2011)
- Thrasher — Killing Time (2011)
- Volcom — Somewhere on Tour (2011)
- Thrasher — Chinese Takeout (2012)
- Volcom — Europe Summer Tour (2012)
- Baker — Bake & Destroy (2012)
- TRAVELOGUE Baker Tour (2015)
- Vans — Propeller (2015)
- Baker Presents "Certi-Fried Pro Rowan Zorilla" Part (2016)
- Volcom — Holy Stokes! (2016)
- Baker — Baker 4 (2019)
- Shake Junt — Shrimp Blunt (2022)
