= Erik Ellington =

American skateboarder

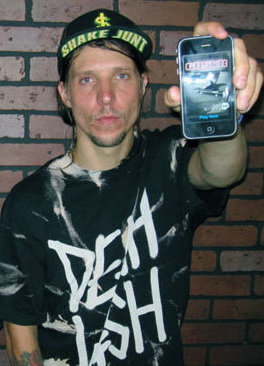
- Ellington in 2010

Personal information
- Born: August 9, 1977 (age 48) Anchorage, Alaska, U.S.
- Home town: Tempe, Arizona, U.S.
- Height: 6 ft 1 in (185 cm)
- Spouse: Amy Ellington

Erik Ellington (born August 9, 1977) is an American professional skateboarder.

He established Bakerboys Distribution with Andrew Reynolds and Jim Greco in 2007. The company provides distribution for closely related skateboard companies. In 2008, Ellington co-founded Deathwish Skateboards with Greco.

== Early life ==
Ellington was born and raised in Anchorage, Alaska. In his teens, he moved to Tempe, Arizona. On the "Epicly Later'd" episode of Vice Media's Internet channel, he said of his early life,

We moved around a lot. When we lived in Alaska, my stepdad had money. He made a decent living; he had a body shop for cars and stuff. But then you move back and forth. Shit goes wrong up there, you move into a janky apartment, whatever. But we['ve] been up and down. I think it's a good experience, you know? To know both sides of the tracks.

Ellington said about living in Anchorage that "There wasn't a whole lot to do up there in winter. But in the summer you'd get between 16 and 22 hours of daylight. So you kind of got a year's worth of skating in those four months."

Ellington's early skateboard influences were the brands H Street and 101. As a teenager he sent video footage of himself to H Street and was sent a Mike Carroll signature model skateboard deck in response.

== Professional skateboarding ==
Ellington first appeared on video when he played a Zero rider in Thrill of it All. Prior to this, he had appeared in the "Friends" section of the Toy Machine video, Welcome to Hell, but the part was uncredited. Ellington had relocated from San Diego to Tempe around the same time that he was recruited by professional skateboarder Jamie Thomas, the founder and owner of Zero. He explained the initial development of his relationship with Thomas:

Jamie Thomas came out to Arizona. Me and Scott Copalman talked to Jamie quite a bit. We were on Balance at the time, and [Thomas] was starting Zero clothing. So he wanted us to ride for the clothing. Actually, he wanted Scott to ride for the clothing. And then Scott said he wouldn't do it unless I was on too. He just said, "I won't leave Balance unless Erik comes with me." So, by default, I got on Zero.

Following the 1997 release of Thrill of it All, fellow professional skateboarder Adrian Lopez told Ellington that Ellington was on the verge of being dismissed from Zero's roster. Thomas explained the situation in a telephone interview, "We were trying to film for Misled Youth and Scotty and Erik went through a spell of several months without doing absolutely anything."

In 2005, Ellington co-founded the Supra footwear company. The company has released six different Ellington signature skate shoe designs, with the sixth model, "The Ellington", released in late 2012.

He established Bakerboys Distribution with Andrew Reynolds and Jim Greco in 2007. Bakerboys Distribution provides distribution for closely related skateboard companies.

In 2008, Ellington co-founded the skateboard deck brand Deathwish with professional skateboarder Jim Greco and, as of 2013, the two partners continue to co-own the company. The company's initial professional team roster consisted of Ellington, Greco, and Lizard King. Deathwish and Baker released the promotional video Baker Has A Deathwish. As of 2013, Copalman is an employee of Deathwish.

Ellington travelled to the Philippines as part of the "2012 Supra Asian Tour" where he was welcomed by the local media as a "living legend". While in the Philippines, Ellington participated in a street skateboarding demonstration at the Centris Walk in Quezon City and got a tattoo that reads "Thrilla In Manila". The Asian tour also visited Tokyo and Osaka, Japan, and Taipei.

In April 2013, the first full-length Deathwish video was released worldwide and Ellington appeared at premiers to promote the video. Entitled The Deathwish Video, the brand's inaugural production features Ellington, Greco, Jon Dickson, Hansen, Neen Williams, Furby, Moose, and Lizard King. Production of the video was overseen by Ellington with assistance from other professional skateboarders like Dustin Dollin.

=== Sponsors ===
Ellington is sponsored by Deathwish, Supra, KR3W, Thunder, Spitfire, Mob Grip, and Shake Junt.

== Bakerboys Distribution ==
In 2007, Ellington and fellow professional skaters Andrew Reynolds and Jim Greco established Bakerboys Distribution as an umbrella company for four skateboard companies—Baker Skateboards, Deathwish, Brigada sunglasses, Heroin, and Shake Junt.

== Influence ==
Skateboard journalist Patrick O'Dell has identified Ellington as one of his favorite skateboarders.

Fellow professional skateboarder Daewon Song, who received a signed copy of a 2014 Deathwish signature skateboard deck, posted on Instagram telling Ellington to "keep inspiring with all your amazing video parts."

== Personal life ==
Ellington resides in Los Angeles with his two children.

In a 2011 interview, Ellington said that in his group of friends he is "probably" best known for "being a bit of a lagger. I'm always late. Nobody can really rely on me, for, uh ... being on time." In his spare time, Ellington enjoys carpentry.

== Videography ==
- Zero: Thrill Of It All (1997)
- 411VM: Issue 20 (1997)
- Baker and Bootleg: Baker Bootleg (1998)
- Zero: Misled Youth (1999)
- Landspeed: CKY (1999)
- ON Video: Spring 2001 (2001)
- Baker: Summer Tour 2001 (2001)
- ON Video: Fall 2002 (2002)
- Emerica: This Is Skateboarding (2003)
- V7: Teenage Tour (2004)
- Emerica: Kids In Emerica (2004)
- Baker: Baker 3 (2005)
- Thrasher: King Of The Road 2006 (2006)
- The Berrics: "Battle Commander" (2007)
- Streets: LA (2007)
- Baker and Deathwish: Baker Has A Deathwish (2008)
- Shake Junt: Chicken Bone Nowison (2009)
- Baker and Deathwish: Baker Has A Deathwish Summer Tour (2009)
- Supra: European Tour (2011)

Ellington has said that the music record label companies make it difficult to get rights to music for skateboard videos and that he doesn't think that the companies understand that kids end up buying music they hear on video featuring their favorite skateboarders.
