= Baker Skateboards =

American skateboarding company

- Type: Public
- Industry: Skateboards
- Founded: 2000
- Founder: Andrew Reynolds; Jay Strickland
- Products: Skateboard decks; wheels; T-shirts; headwear; flannels; headwear; socks; posters; lunchboxes
- Website: bakerskateboards.com

Baker Skateboards is an American skateboarding company founded in 2000, by professional skateboarder Andrew Reynolds. The company's main products are skateboard decks, accessories, wheels, and apparel.

== History ==
In 1999, Reynolds met with Tony Hawk & Per Welinder and started Baker Skateboards with Jay Strickland in 2000. In 2007, the skateboard deck brand signed a distribution deal with Blitz Distribution. As of 2008, the brand was the top-selling brand under the Blitz Distribution umbrella. In regard to the original Baker logo, Reynolds has credited the design to co-founder, Jay Strickland, and stated that it represented a motley company that consisted of talented skateboarders.

Leo Romero, Thrasher magazine's "Skateboarder of the Year" in 2010, left the Baker team in April 2009.

Riley Hawk, son of professional skateboarder and Birdhouse company owner Tony Hawk, joined the Baker team in 2012, after riding for his father's company.

=== Baker Zone ===
The RIDE Channel, a YouTube skateboarding channel co-founded by Hawk, announced on March 15, 2013, that a new series, entitled "Baker Zone," would commence on March 18, 2013. The series featured video productions from the Baker company, such as "Weekend Warriors," "Piled Out," "Trash Compactor," and "Dumb Ass Park Footy."

== Pro Team ==
- Andrew Reynolds
- Dustin Dollin
- Kevin "Spanky" Long
- Bryan Herman
- Sammy Baca
- Don "Nuge" Nguyen
- Justin "Figgy" Figueroa
- Theotis Beasley
- Riley Hawk
- Rowan Zorilla
- Tristan "T-Funk" Funkhouser
- Elissa Steamer
- Tyson Peterson
- Jacopo Carozzi
- Zach Allen
- Casper Brooker
- Sully Cormier

== Amateur Team ==
- Zion Effs
- Vince Palmer
- Stu Kirst
- Max Wasungu
- Lyric Bennet
- Mingus Gamble
- Sengo Prevost

== Bakerboys Distribution ==
In 2007, Reynolds and fellow professional skateboarders, Jim Greco and Erik Ellington, established Bakerboys Distribution, a company that distributes many brands, some of which are owned by past and current Baker riders:

- Baker Skateboards
- Shake Junt
- Happy Hour Shades
- Deathwish Skateboards
- Volume 4
- Heroin Skateboards
- Palace Skateboards
- Hammers
- Death Lens
- Illegal Civilization
- Ashbury
- ABC Hat Co.
- Birdhouse Skateboards
- Call Me 917
- Gnarhunters
- The Heated Wheel

Formerly with the Blitz distribution company, Baker's distribution was newly managed by Bakerboys in 2011.

The Palace skateboard brand, which won the "Brand of the Year" award at Europe's Brighton Trade Show in January 2012, announced a distribution deal with Bakerboys in July 2014. The video appeared on the "PWBC News" series that Palace produces.

== Heroin Skateboards ==
Created by England-born artist Mark "Fos" Foster, the Heroin brand was named after Fos' addiction to "skateboarding." The global premiere of the Heroin skateboards video, Video Nasty, was held in Los Angeles, US on June 27, 2013, and included parts from Chet Childress, Deer Man of Dark Woods, Daniel Shimizu, Gou Myagi, Rogie, and Tom Day. Foster's debut American art show, "Diamonds And The Rough," was presented at the Kingswell Gallery in Los Angeles, US, on June 14, 2014.

== Hammers ==
Greco's skateboard and clothing brand, Hammers, was launched in October 2014, as part of Bakerboys Distribution. Greco explained that the brand is "based on individuality, the pure moment of creation ... It's just based on creating."

== Videography ==
- Baker Bootleg (1999)
- Baker 2g (2000)
- Summer Tour 2001 (2002)
- Baker 3 (2005)
- Shake Junt (2006)
- Baker Has a Deathwish (2008)
- Baker Has a Deathwish Summer Tour Video (2009)
- Shake Junt - Chicken Bone Nowison (2011)
- Bake And Destroy (2012)
- The Deathwish Video (2013)
- TRAVELOGUE Baker Tour (2015)
- Baker Presents "Certi-Fried Pro Rowan Zorilla" Part (2016)
- Shake Junt - Skate Tank (2016)
- Baker 4 (2019)
- Deathwish - Uncrossed (2020)
- Shake Junt - Shrimp Blunt (2022)
- Baker Has a Deathwish Part 2 (2024)
