= Krew (brand) =

Apparel company headquartered in California, USA

KR3W Logo

KREW is a lifestyle brand that was cofounded by Angel Cabada in 2002. KREW is owned by ACX, Inc, a company based in Hollywood, Los Angeles.

Cabada is also the Founder of STRAYE, SUPRA and was previously a partner in TSA Clothing, another skateboard apparel company, but left shortly before its demise.
