= List of San Francisco skate spots =

List of skate spots in San Francisco, California:

Name	Type	Location	Photo	Status	Notes
3 Up 3 Down	street skating	San Francisco Armory		Active	
3rd and Army	street skating	Mission Bay		Active	
Bart Wall Ride	street skating, wall ride	24th Street Mission station		Active	
Bay Blocks	street skating	Embarcadero		Active	
China Banks	street skating	Chinatown		Endangered	Plans by the city to demolish it. World famous site.
Clipper Hubba	street skating	James Lick Middle School		Active	
The Dish	bowl / skatepark	Bayview-Hunters Point		Active	Oldest skatepark in San Francisco. Opened in 1980.
Doloris Street	hill bomb	Mission Dolores Park		Endangered	Annual hill bomb event organized here. The city installed Botts' dots to attempt to close the spot.
Double Kink Rail	street skating	Mission Dolores Park		Active	
EMB	street skating	Embarcadero, 37.7949°N 122.3948°W		Active, partially demolished	Includes sites such as "The Island", The Gonz Gap, and others One of the most important sites in the development of street skating. Due to opposition to skateboarding, some of the ledges and benches (including the Hubba Hideout) were removed by the city to make it less skate-able.
Flower Shop	DIY skatepark	1105 Tompkins Ave		Active	
Fort Miley	street skating	Lands End, 37°46′55.72″N 122°30′19.95″W		Active	
Hubba Hideout	street skating	Embarcadero Plaza		Demolished	Demolished by the city in 2011
Lincoln High School	street skating	Lincoln High School, Sunset District, 37.74728°N 122.48103°W		Active	Contains the skate feature called the 3-block
Pier 7	street skating	Pier 7		Endangered	Concrete slabs were replaced with wooden slats. Protective barriers have been installed to prevent skateboarding.
Pier 15 bench	street skating / urbanism exhibit	Pier 15		Active	A bench designed for the specific purpose of skateboarding while also being useful for sitting. Meant to be pro-skating and to be an antithesis to anti-skate devices.
Potrero Del Sol Skatepark	skatepark	Potrero Avenue and 25th Street		Active	City-sponsored skatepark
SoMa West Skatepark	skatepark	SoMa		Active	City-sponsored skatepark
Studio 43	skatepark	Bayview-Hunters Point		Defunct	Warehouse skatepark active during the 90s and since closed down
Sunset Dunes	skatepark	The Avenues		Active	Skatepark with half pipe and pump track at the south end of Sunset Dunes park
Twin Peaks	Hill bomb / Flatground freestyle	Twin Peaks, 37°45′06″N 122°26′52″W		Active	
UN Plaza	skate park			Active	
Union Square	Street skating	Union Square, 37°47′17″N 122°24′27″W		Active	Limited access due to policing and crowds
Wallenberg Set	street skating	Raoul Wallenberg Traditional High School, 37*46'48.86"N, 122*26'46.82"W		Active	
Waller Ledges	DIY/official skatepark	Golden Gate Park, 37.768263N, -122.454081W		Active	DIY park that was city approved and is now city-sponsored
