= Alec Beck =

American skateboarder

Personal information
- Born: United States
- Occupations: Skateboarder; Skatepark designer; Associate Director of Advocacy & Public Engagement at The Skatepark Project
- Spouse: Amelia Brodka

Sport
- Sport: Skateboarding
- Event(s): Park, Street, Vert, Bowl

Alec Beck is an American professional skateboarder, public space advocate, skatepark designer, and Olympic coach.

As of 2024, Beck works as the Associate Director of Advocacy & Public Engagement at The Skatepark Project (formerly The Tony Hawk Foundation).

== Career ==
=== Skateboarding ===
Beck's skateboarding career spans over 20 years, from competing in national competitions to video parts for various brands. Beck and his ZJ Boarding House team won gold at ESPN X Games 16 held in Los Angeles.

Beck was a featured athlete over three seasons on the Fuel TV, Built to Shred television series.

Beck has produced numerous video parts, including his Birdhouse pro debut video.

=== Skatepark advocacy ===
Alec was the lead advocate for the development and designer of Stoner Skate Plaza at Stoner Park in West Los Angeles, California.

After his successful advocacy for Stoner Skate Plaza, Alec worked with the local council, Aaron Snyder and Nike to liberate the famed West LA Courthouse for legalized skateboarding.

Beck was hired at the Tony Hawk Foundation, now known as The Skatepark Project, in 2015. In his work at The Skatepark Project, he supports skatepark advocates across the country and helps manage high profile skatepark development including the Brooklyn Banks, Brooklyn Skate Garden, Blue Park, and others. Beck authored the Skatepark Best Practices Guide. Beck has published articles in Parks and Rec Business magazine. Additionally, Beck is a regular speaker at National Recreation and Parks Association conference education sessions and podcast.

Beck cohosted The Skatepark Podcast, a skatepark focused podcast produced by The Skatepark Project. In 2023, Beck was the guest of University of Chicago’s Architecture Professor Stewart Hick tour looking at Chicago through the lenses of urban planning and active city spaces.

=== Skatepark design ===
Beck was the lead designer for Stoner Park along with Colby Carter & California Skateparks.

In 2017, Beck designed two Detroit-based skateparks with Tony Hawk and notable artists related to the Library Street Collective, including the Wayfinding Skatepark with Ryan McGinness and the It Takes A Village Skatepark at the Shepherd Art Center with McArthur Binion.

=== Olympic coaching ===
In 2021, Beck was an Olympic Skateboarding coach at Tokyo 2021 Olympics for the Polish Skate Federation, coaching his wife Amelia Brodka.

== Personal life ==
Beck is married to professional skateboarder Amelia Brodka. Their unconventional marriage proposal gained media attention.
