= Maritime Plaza =

Elevated park in San Francisco, U.S.

- Maritime Plaza Park
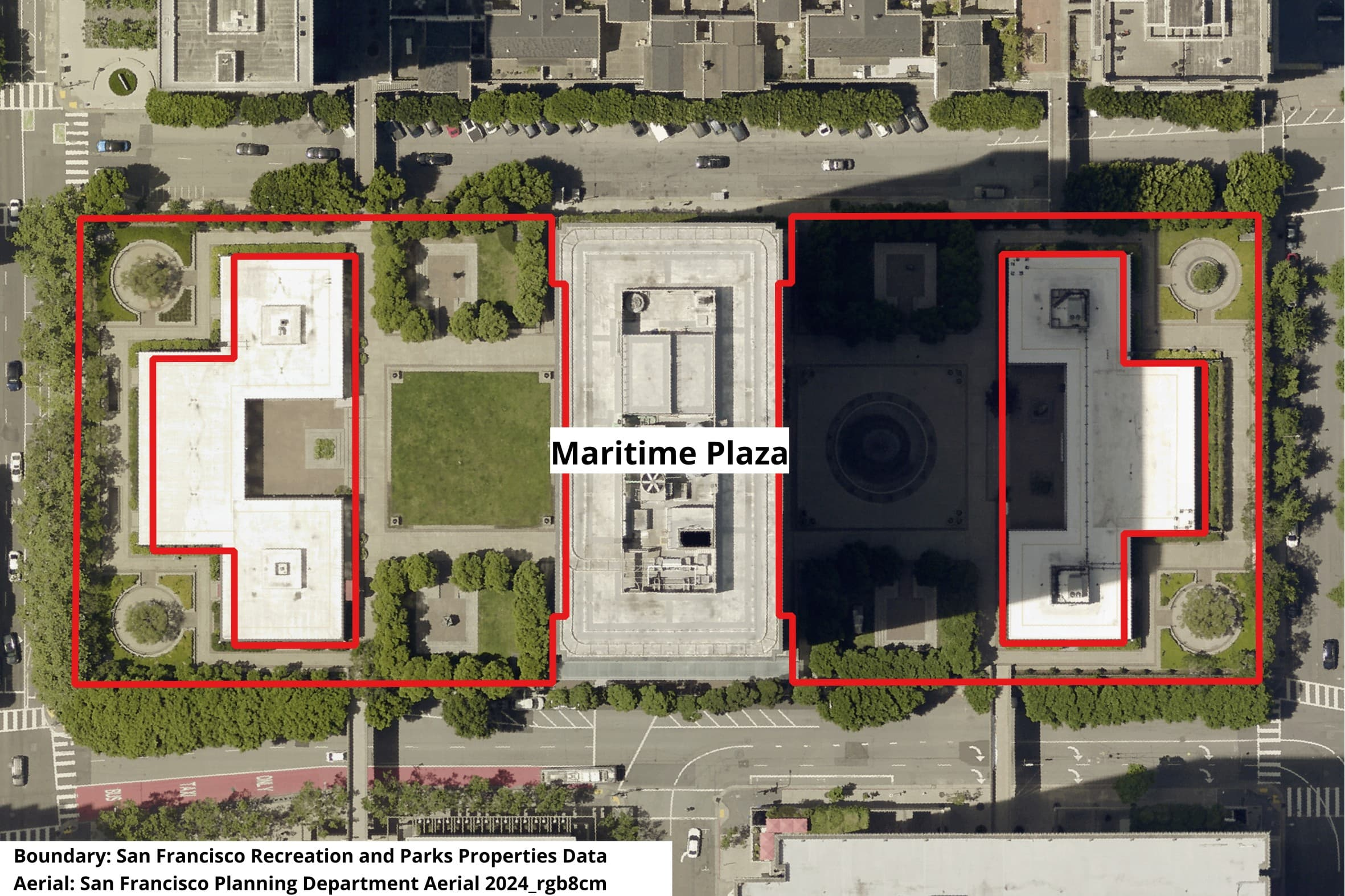
- 2024 aerial of Maritime Plaza
- Interactive map of Maritime Plaza
- Type: Urban park
- Location: San Francisco, California
- Coordinates: 37.7955872°N 122.3996226°W
- Area: 2 acres (0.81 ha; 0.0031 mi^{2}; 0.0081 km^{2})
- Created: 1967
- Designer: Sasaki, Walker and Associates
- Owner: San Francisco Recreation & Parks Department
- Operator: San Francisco Recreation & Parks Department
- Open: All year
- Parking: Street parking

Maritime Plaza, sometimes known as Maritime Plaza Park, is a 2-acre (0.81 ha) elevated park and roof garden in San Francisco, California in the Financial District, in the U.S. state of California. Designed in 1967 by landscape architects Sasaki, Walker and Associates, it surrounds the One Maritime Plaza building. The park can be accessed from the ground level via staircases or via elevated walkways from adjacent Embarcadero Center on the south and apartment buildings on the north. The park is owned and operated by the San Francisco Recreation & Parks Department.

Simplified map of Maritime Plaza

Maritime Plaza is bordered by Washington Street on the north, Davis Street on the east, Clay Street on the south, and Battery Street on the west.

Several pieces of the San Francisco Civic Art Collection are located in the plaza, including Standing Figure – Knife Edge by Henry Moore, Bronze Horse by Marino Marini, Bronze Icosaspirale by Charles O. Perry, and Limits of Horizon II by Jan Peter Stern. The central Peacock Fountain, sometimes referred to as the dandelion fountain, was designed by architect Robert Woodward.

== History ==
Maritime Plaza was designed in 1967 by landscape architects Sasaki, Walker and Associates. This design was coordinated with architects Skidmore, Owings & Merrill, who designed One Maritime Plaza (then known as the Alcoa building), and Wurster, Bernardi & Emmons, who designed the garage below the park.

The original design included a concrete bridge and stairs connecting the park to Sue Bierman Park. As street skateboarding became popular in the late 1980s, this bridge and stairs became known as Hubba Hideout, a well-known skateboarding location.

In 2010, the bridge and stairs were removed as part of a redesign of Sue Bierman Park by ROMA Design Group.

The smaller buildings located throughout the plaza are under commercial use, such as restaurants.

== Gallery ==
One Maritime Plaza circa 1965 to 1985 (AAR-6682)

Maritime Plaza circa 1965 to 1985 (AAR-6775)

Maritime Plaza circa 1965 to 1985 (AAR-6780)

Maritime Plaza circa 1965 to 1985 (AAR-6778)

Peacock fountain by Robert Woodward at One Maritime Plaza in 1969-07 (AAR-6736)
