= Hubba =

Hubba, hubba is a North American informal exclamation used to express approval, excitement, or enthusiasm, especially with regard to a person's appearance.

Hubba may also refer to:

== Locations ==
- Hubba Hubba Revue, a burlesque and variety show in San Francisco
- Pat's Hubba Hubba, a restaurant in Port Chester, NY
- Hubba Hideout, a famous skateboarding spot in San Francisco

== Food ==
- Hubba Bubba, a brand of bubble gum

== People ==
- Hubba Hubba, one of the characters from The Hoobs
- Hubba, also known as Ubba, a ninth-century Viking
- Hubba Shyamal, Indian gangster

== Other ==
- A slang term for crack cocaine
- A skateboarding term for a large concrete block used to do tricks on (originating with Hubba Hideout)
- "Hubba Hubba Zoot Zoot", a novelty song by the Swedish band Caramba from their 1981 self-titled album
- Hubba (film), a 2024 Indian gangster film
- HubbaBubbas, Singaporean band
- Hubba, a genus of spiders
