= Skate spot =

Location used for skateboarding

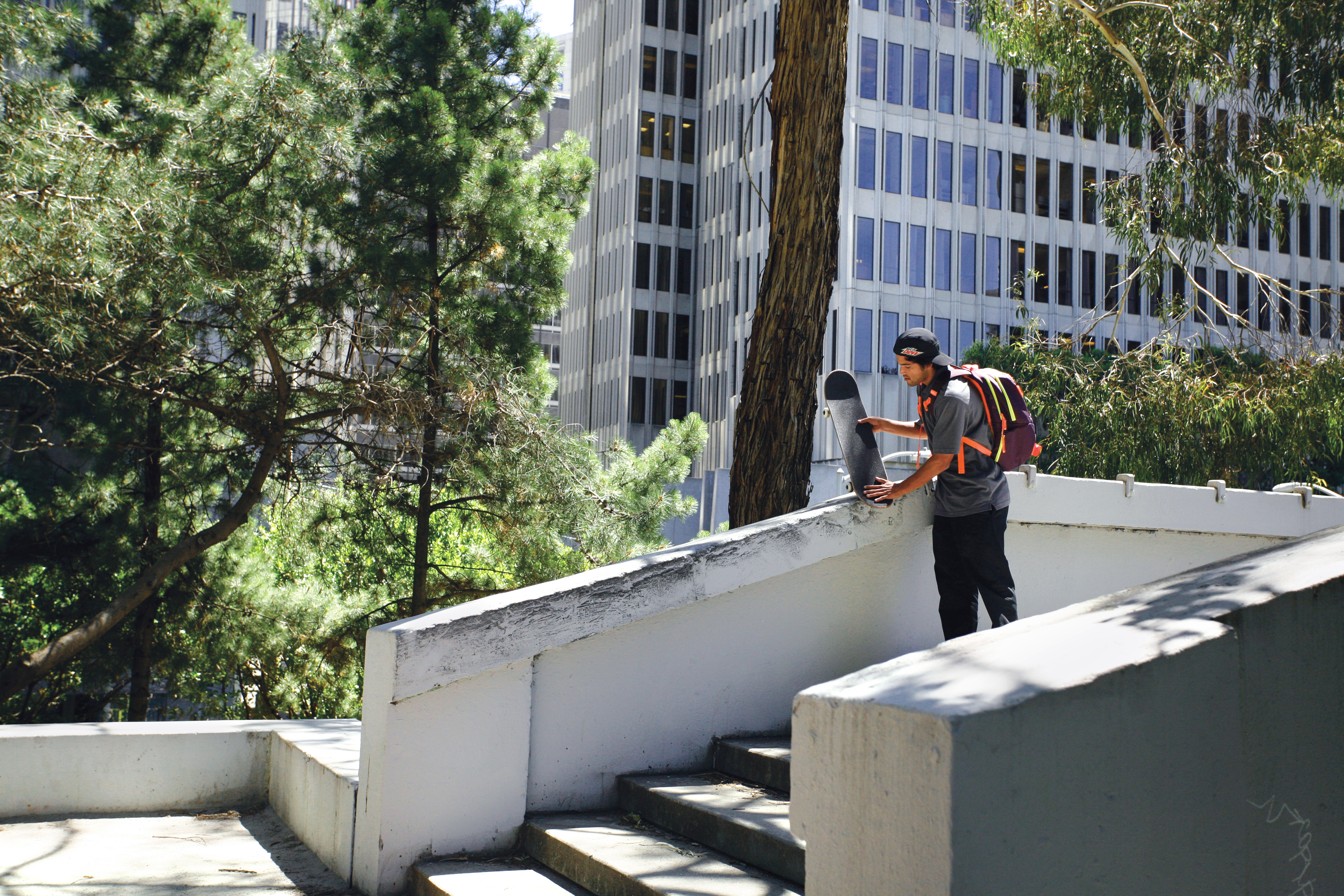
Paul Rodriguez at the Hubba Hideout skate spot in 2010

A skate spot is a location used for skateboarding.

A range of locations qualify as skate spots, as any area where one can ride their skateboard can be considered a skate spot. From the flat ground basketball courts at Tompkins Square Park to the large concrete ledges of Hubba Hideout, skate spots exist in every shape in every city. Not all skate spots last forever. In some instances, the local skateboarding community rallies together to attempt to save a treasured skate spot, such as with the Brooklyn Banks. Skate spots are sometimes turned into DIY skateparks when skateboarders bring in obstacles and cement to make their own terrain.

== List of skate spots ==
=== B ===
- Barcelona Museum of Contemporary Art
- Brooklyn Banks
- Baldy pipe

=== C ===
- Carlsbad Gap
- China Banks

=== E ===
- El Toro
- Embarcadero
- EZ-7

=== H ===
- Harrow Skate Park
- Hollywood High School
- Hubba Hideout

=== L ===
- Love Park
- Lyon 25

=== N ===
- Nude Bowl

=== R ===
- Rincon bleachers
- The Rom

=== T ===
- Tompkins Square Park

=== W ===
- Wallenberg Set
- West LA Courthouse skate plaza

== See also ==
- List of San Francisco skate spots
