= 1996 FIFA Futsal World Championship squads =

This article lists the confirmed national futsal squads for the 1996 FIFA Futsal World Championship tournament held in Spain, between 24 November and 8 December 1996.

== Group A ==
=== Spain ===
Head coach: Javier Lozano Cid

No.	Pos.	Player	Date of birth (age)	Caps	Goals	Club
1	GK	Jesús Clavería	4 January 1968 (aged 28)			(Spain) Interviú Boomerang
2	DF	Julio García	27 May 1972 (aged 24)			(Spain) Interviú Boomerang
3	DF	Santi Herrero	27 March 1971 (aged 25)			
4	DF	Fran Torres	12 August 1969 (aged 27)			
5	MF	Vicentín	25 June 1969 (aged 27)			
6	DF	Joan Linares	24 February 1975 (aged 21)			
7	MF	Pato	6 March 1967 (aged 29)			
8	MF	Javier Lorente	21 April 1970 (aged 26)			
9	FW	Javi Sánchez	15 January 1971 (aged 25)			
10	MF	Javi Rodríguez	26 March 1974 (aged 22)			
11	FW	Arnaldo Ferreira	16 August 1968 (aged 28)			
12	GK	Juanjo	24 August 1972 (aged 24)			

=== Ukraine ===
Head coach: Gennadiy Lisenchuk

No.	Pos.	Player	Date of birth (age)	Caps	Goals	Club
1	GK	Oleg Zozulya	5 May 1965 (age 31)			
2	DF	Iouri Oussakovskii	10 October 1968 (age 28)			
3	DF	Serhiy Oussakovskii	10 October 1968 (age 28)			
4	MF	Oleg Bezugly	14 January 1969 (age 27)			
5	DF	Taras Voniarkha	15 June 1971 (age 25)			
6	MF	Vitaliy Brunko	24 October 1976 (age 20)			
7	FW	Georgii Melnikov	10 March 1975 (age 21)			
8	FW	Olexandr Kosenko	18 January 1970 (age 26)			
9	MF	Oleksandre Moskaliuk	9 February 1970 (age 26)			
10	FW	Volodymyr Obihod	2 February 1967 (age 29)			
11	MF	Igor Moskvychov	6 November 1971 (age 25)			
12	GK	Alexandre Kondratenko	2 September 1974 (age 22)			

=== Egypt ===
Head coach: Farouk El Sayed

No.	Pos.	Player	Date of birth (age)	Caps	Goals	Club
1	GK	Yasser Mohamed	7 April 1973 (age 23)			
2	MF	Hashim El Desuoky	23 March 1975 (age 21)			
3	MF	Mohamed Sayed Ibrahim	2 August 1970 (age 26)			
4	DF	Remah Abou Zeid	2 December 1976 (age 19)			
5	DF	Tamer Ismail	19 October 1968 (age 28)			
6	DF	Mustafa Abdelatif	21 September 1975 (age 21)			
7	FW	Mowafak Ibrahim	16 February 1960 (age 36)			
8	MF	Hussin Hassan	15 October 1969 (age 27)			
9	MF	Salama Ahmed	3 January 1971 (age 25)			
10	MF	Badr Mahmoud	15 May 1959 (age 37)			
11	FW	Mohamed Saad Mohamed	15 May 1959 (age 37)			
12	GK	Abdel Hamid Hassan	27 March 1961 (age 35)			

=== Australia ===
Head coach: James Roberts

No.	Pos.	Player	Date of birth (age)	Caps	Goals	Club
1	GK	Adam Confoy	21 June 1971 (age 25)			
2	MF	Rob Perinovic	9 July 1974 (age 22)			
3	DF	Elliot Zwangobani	23 October 1973 (age 23)			
4	MF	Fortunato Carvalho	9 June 1968 (age 28)			
5	DF	Martin Calvert	13 November 1975 (age 21)			
6	DF	Paul Roberts	19 December 1973 (age 22)			
7	FW	Simon Aitchison	31 August 1972 (age 24)			
8	FW	Vince Nastoski	12 March 1965 (age 31)			
9	MF	Jamie Amendolia	16 February 1977 (age 19)			
10	MF	Jason Wells	27 March 1971 (age 25)			
11	FW	Zlatko Momircevski	2 April 1971 (age 25)			
12	GK	Jorge Suarez	10 August 1976 (age 20)			

== Group B ==
=== Netherlands ===
Head coach: Ron Groenewoud

No.	Pos.	Player	Date of birth (age)	Caps	Goals	Club
1		Michel Wentzel	28 June 1966 (age 30)			
2		Anton Biloro	19 August 1969 (age 27)			
3		Johnny Keur	16 February 1967 (age 29)			
4		Hanky Leatemia	13 July 1966 (age 30)			
5		Hjalmar Hoekema	16 November 1965 (age 31)			
6		Henny Lettinck	5 January 1967 (age 29)			
7		Pascal Langenhuijsen	4 June 1971 (age 25)			
8		Moes Talha	1 December 1970 (age 25)			
9		Edwin Grunholz	15 August 1969 (age 27)			
10		Johannes Ludwig	9 May 1962 (age 34)			
11		Johannes de Bever	7 April 1965 (age 31)			
12		Tom Sier	17 November 1973 (age 23)			

=== Russia ===
Head coach: Semen ANDREEV

No.	Pos.	Player	Date of birth (age)	Caps	Goals	Club
1		Ilya SAMOKHIN	10 August 1970 (age 26)			
2		Konstantin Eremenko	5 August 1970 (age 26)			
3		Alexei OUSKOV	12 December 1962 (age 33)			
4		Alexander VERIZHNIKOV	16 July 1968 (age 28)			
5		Temur ALEKBEROV	22 September 1969 (age 27)			
6		Dmitry CHUGUNOV	9 June 1968 (age 28)			
7		Vadim IACHINE	27 June 1971 (age 25)			
8		Dmitri GORINE	9 May 1972 (age 24)			
9		Alexey KISSELEV	1 October 1969 (age 27)			
10		Arkadiy BELYI	31 May 1973 (age 23)			
11		Mikhail KOCHTCHEEV	9 April 1967 (age 29)			
12		Alexei EVTEEV	4 August 1975 (age 21)			

=== Argentina ===
Head coach: Fernando LARRANAGA

No.	Pos.	Player	Date of birth (age)	Caps	Goals	Club
1		Javier GUISANDE	15 December 1975 (age 20)			
2		Leandro PLANAS	28 November 1975 (age 20)			
3		Sebastian PACHECO	10 January 1974 (age 22)			
4		Diego CASTANARES	29 April 1975 (age 21)			
5		Marcelo SCHEAVE	17 December 1969 (age 26)			
6		Daniel DICHIARO	14 March 1969 (age 27)			
7		Pablo PARILLA	24 July 1973 (age 23)			
8		Carlos SANCHEZ	31 January 1975 (age 21)			
9		Rodrigo PETILLO	19 May 1977 (age 19)			
10		Mariano TALLAFERRO	19 December 1974 (age 21)			
11		Leonardo MAGARELLI	21 August 1974 (age 22)			
12		Leonardo RUIZ	24 September 1970 (age 26)			

=== China ===
Head coach: GENBAO Xu

No.	Pos.	Player	Date of birth (age)	Caps	Goals	Club
1		CAI Jian Lin	23 July 1965 (age 31			
2		WU Bing	7 February 1968 (age 28)			
3		CHENG Yaodong	16 June 1967 (age 29)			
4		ZHU Qi	2 June 1972 (age 24)			
5		MAO Yijun	28 December 1970 (age 25)			
6		SHEN Si	1 May 1973 (age 23)			
7		GU Zhao Nian	18 December 1974 (age 21)			
8		ZHANG Yong	26 January 1975 (age 21)			
9		QI Hong	3 June 1976 (age 20)			
10		LIU Jun	25 January 1970 (age 26)			
11		ZHANG Yi	4 January 1973 (age 23)			
12		WANG Hui	23 September 1978 (age 18)			

== Group C ==
=== Italy ===
Head coach: Carlo FACCHIN

No.	Pos.	Player	Date of birth (age)	Caps	Goals	Club
1		Francesco FRADELLA				
2		Massimo RISCINO				
3		Salvatore ZAFFIRO				
4		Ivano ROMA				
5		Andrea BEARZI				
6		Andrea FAMA				
7		Massimo QUATTRINI				
8		Alfredo ESPOSITO				
9		Roberto MATRANGA				
10		Massimiliano MANNINO				
11		Gabriele CALECA				
12		Francesco COPPOLA				

=== Uruguay ===
Head coach: Rolando MUNIZ

No.	Pos.	Player	Date of birth (age)	Caps	Goals	Club
1		Mauro ROIBAL				
2		Jorge COLINA				
3		Alvaro PINEIRO				
4		Uriol NUNEZ				
5		Diego IMPERIO				
6		Pablo LAMANNA				
7		PICO				
8		Silvio RAPELA				
9		Andres D ALESSANDRO				
10		Claudio GUERRA				
11		Daniel VARELA				
12		Ariel DI PIERRO				

=== United States ===
Head coach: John KOWALSKI

No.	Pos.	Player	Date of birth (age)	Caps	Goals	Club
1		Victor Manuel NOGUEIRA				
2		George FERNANDEZ				
3		Oscar DRAGUICEVICH				
4		Jon PARRY				
5		Goran HUNJAK				
6		Sean BOWERS				
7		Jim GABARRA				
8		Frank KLOPAS				
9		Mark MOSER				
10		Franklin McINTOSH				
11		Dennis BROSE				
12		Otto ORF				

=== Malaysia ===
Head coach: Vic Hermans

No.	Pos.	Player	Date of birth (age)	Caps	Goals	Club
1		Khairul Azman Mohamed				
2		Mohd Raizuwah Idris				
3		Zainal Abidin Hassan				
4		Anuar Jusoh				
5		Lim Seng Kong				
6		Rosdee Sulong				
7		Mohammad Nazri Yunus				
8		Zami Mohd Noor				
9		Dollah Salleh				
10		Azman Adnan				
11		Azrul Amri Burhan				
12		Mudzar Mohamad				

== Group D ==
=== Brazil ===
Head coach: Takão

No.	Pos.	Player	Date of birth (age)	Caps	Goals	Club
1	GK	Serginho				
2		Bagé				
3		Márcio				
4		Waginho				
5	MF	Manoel Tobias				
6		Fininho				
7		Sandrinho				
8		Danilo				
9		Clóvis				
10		Chôco				
11		Djacir				
12	MF	Vander				

=== Belgium ===
Head coach: Damien KNABBEN

No.	Pos.	Player	Date of birth (age)	Caps	Goals	Club
1		Geert BUVE				
2		Youssef EL GUIR				
3		Abdelhafid EL GUIR				
4		Marcel CLAESEN				
5		Pascal DELREE				
6		Tim VERGAUWEN				
7		Ivan HECHTERMANS				
8		Bert MICHIELS				
9		Pasquale COCCO				
10		Benoit JANSSEN				
11		Herman BEYERS				
12		Philippe MARCHE				

=== Iran ===
Head coach:Reza Mohammadkazemi

No.	Pos.	Player	Date of birth (age)	Caps	Goals	Club
1	GK	Ahmad Sajjadi				(Iran) Bahman
2		Masoud Estili				(Iran) Zob Ahan
3		Sadegh Varmazyar				(Iran) n/a
4		Reza Zarkhanli				(Iran) Entezam
5		Majid Saleh				(Iran) PAS Tehran
6		Ali Javadi				(Iran) Payam Moghavemat
7		Hossein Hosseini				(Iran) Aboomoslem
8		Hashem Heidari				(Iran) PAS Tehran
9		Hassan Arsalani				(Iran) Sepidrood
10		Mohammad Mehranpour				(Iran) Esteghlal
11		Mehdi Sepiddast				(Iran) Shamoushak
12		Mohammad Ali Yahyavi				(Iran) Esteghlal

=== Cuba ===
Head coach: Clemente REINOSO

No.	Pos.	Player	Date of birth (age)	Caps	Goals	Club
1		Alain SOBRINO				
2		Boris SANAME				
3		Jose CAMEJO				
4		Aliet MARTINEZ				
5		Fredy HERRERA				
6		Pillin GUERRA				
7		Alexander MOSQUERA				
8		Ernesto RODRIGUEZ				
9		Camilo MENDOZA				
10		Papi PORTAL				
11		Vladimir IBANEZ				
12		Dagmar GOMEZ				
