= Sue Bierman Park =

Park in San Francisco, United States of America

- Ferry Park
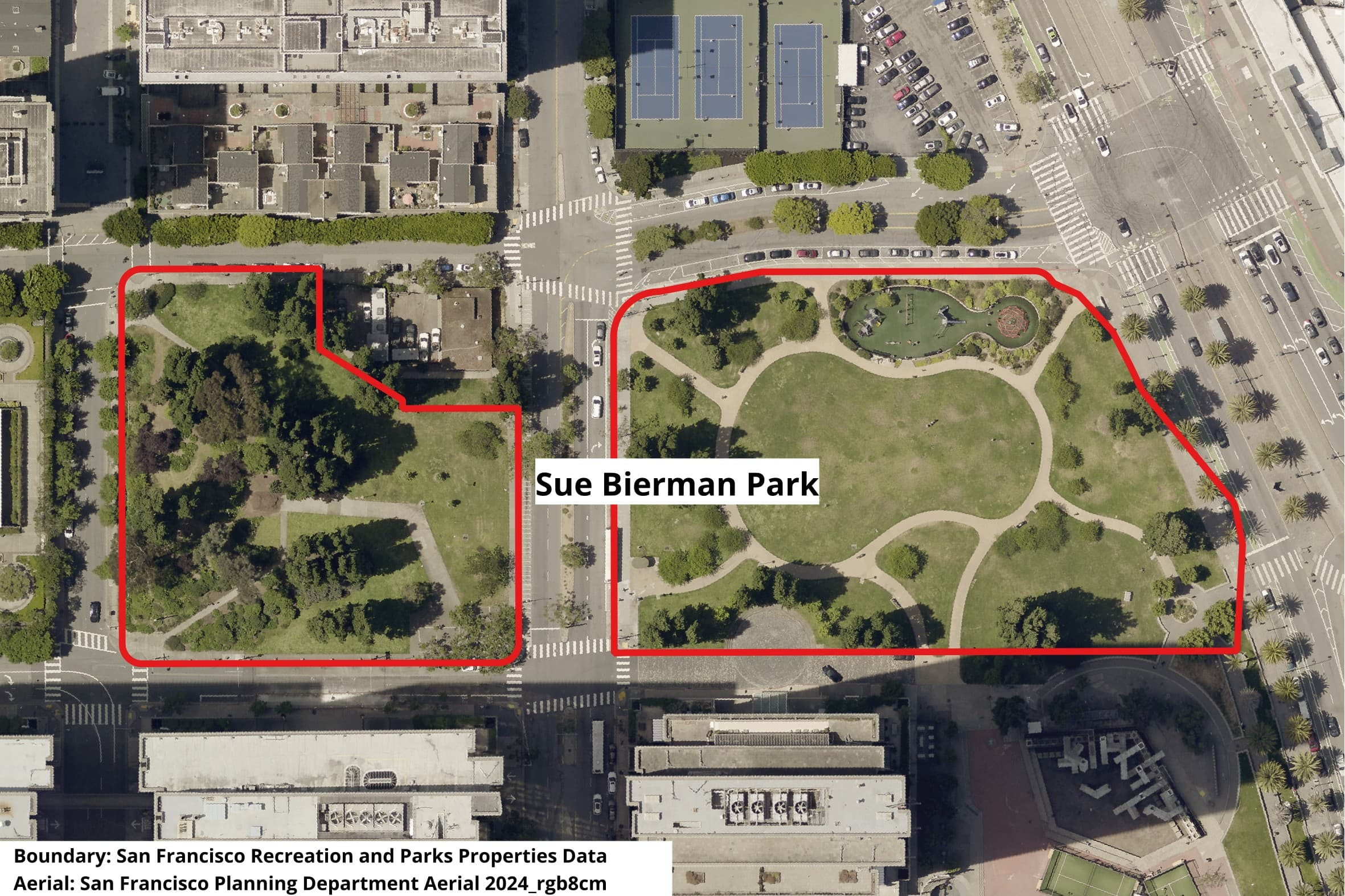
- 2024 aerial of Sue Bierman Park
- Interactive map of Sue Bierman Park
- Type: Urban park
- Location: San Francisco, California
- Coordinates: 37.795939°N 122.396592°W
- Area: 4.5 acres (1.8 ha; 0.0070 mi^{2}; 0.018 km^{2})
- Created: 1975
- Designer: Lawrence Halprin & Associates (1975), ROMA Design Group (2010 renovation)
- Owner: San Francisco Recreation & Parks Department
- Operator: San Francisco Recreation & Parks Department
- Open: All year
- Parking: Street parking
- Public transit: BART and Muni, Embarcadero station

Sue Bierman Park, previously known as Ferry Park, is a 4.5-acre (1.8 ha) park in San Francisco, California in the Financial District, in the U.S. state of California. The park is named after Sue Bierman, a San Francisco civic activist and San Francisco Supervisor. It was completed in 1975 and is owned and operated by the San Francisco Recreation & Parks Department.

Sue Bierman Park is bordered by Washington Street on the north, The Embarcadero on the east, a combination of Embarcadero Plaza and Clay Street on the south, and Davis Street on the west. Drumm Street cuts through the center of the park.

== History ==
=== 1970s–1989: Construction and early history ===
Designed alongside Embarcadero Plaza by Lawrence Halprin & Associates, the park was completed in 1975 and covered two blocks. The park was known as Ferry Park until its renaming in 2007.

Upon completion, it was bordered by Washington Street on the north, The Embarcadero on the east, a combination of Embarcadero Plaza and Clay Street on the south, and Davis Street on the west. The Embarcadero Freeway, including its on and off ramps, passed over the park.

Map of Sue Bierman Park

The original design included a concrete bridge and stairs connecting the park to Maritime Plaza. As street skateboarding became popular in the late 1980s, this bridge and stairs became known as Hubba Hideout, a well-known skateboarding location.

=== 1989–2010: Earthquake and changing use ===
The 1989 Loma Prieta earthquake caused significant damage to the Embarcadero Freeway, leading to the freeway's demolition in 1991, causing the surrounding area to open up. This included the on and off ramps within the park.

=== 2010–present: ROMA redesign and current use ===
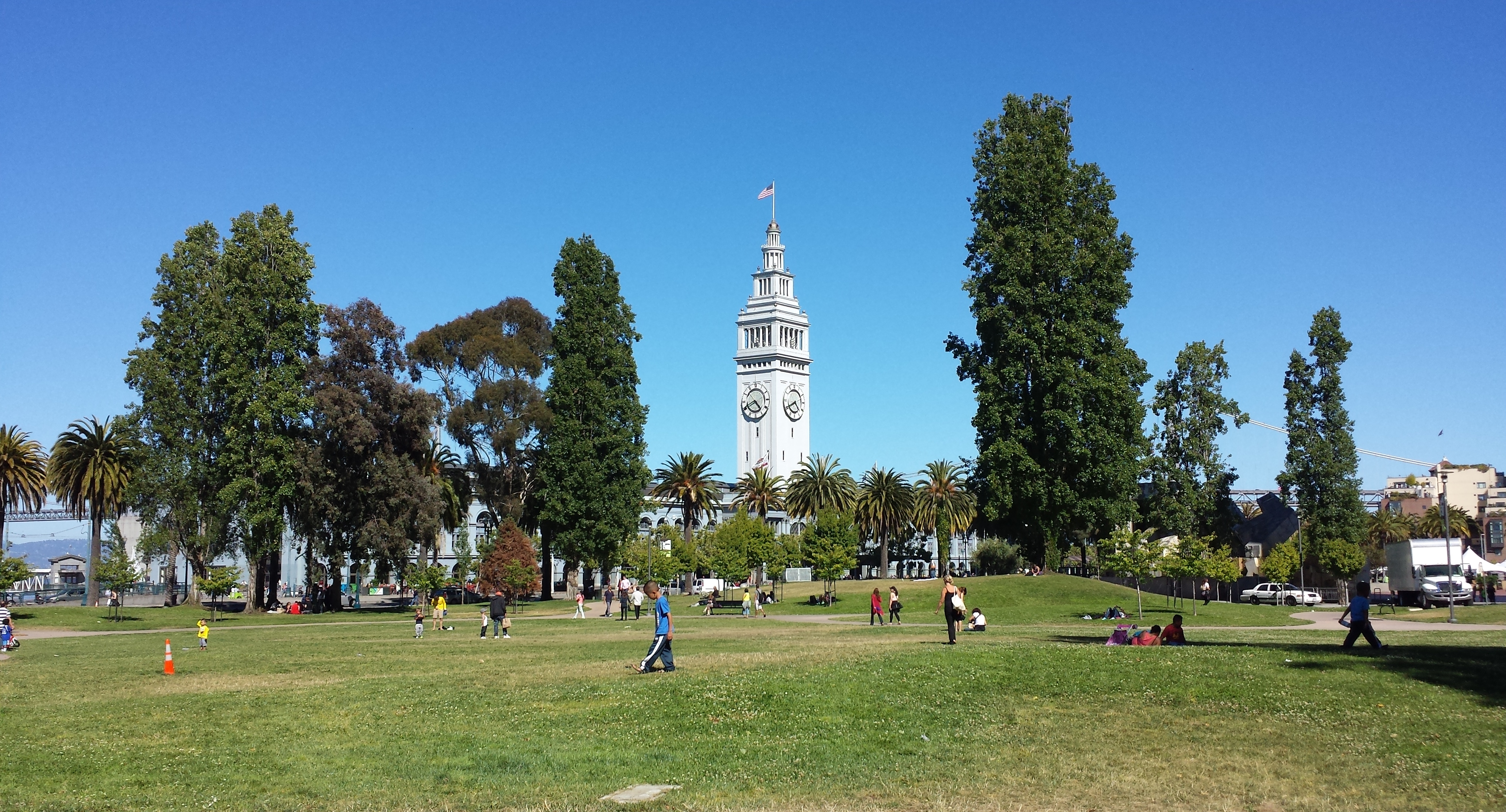
Sue Bierman Park with the Ferry Building in the background, 2014

Beginning around 2010, the park was fully redesigned by ROMA Design Group. Renovations included the removal of all Lawrence Halprin-designed features, as well as the bridge connecting the park to Maritime Plaza, removing direct access between the two parks.

In 2007, the park was renamed "Sue Bierman Park" after Supervisor Sue Bierman, who died in 2006.

On October 4, 2011, the renovation was completed. Press panned the new park, describing it as "a design that squanders the setting".

In 2013, a playground was constructed at the northeast corner of the park.

In 2025, a report by an independent consultant found that Sue Bierman Park was not individually eligible for listing in the National Register or California Register under any criteria.
