= Baldy pipe =

Skateboarding spot in Los Angeles, California

Baldy pipe, or the Mt. Baldy Pipeline, is the name given by skateboarders to an iconic skate spot in San Bernardino County. It is a water pipeline that--along with the San Antonio Dam, which it is part of--offers flood protection for areas to the south. In the early history of vert skateboarding, it became a popular spot for skateboarders and was featured in many skate videos. It has been used as a skate spot since the mid-1970s.
