= West LA Courthouse skate plaza =

Skatepark in Santa Monica, California

Coordinates: 34.04573°N 118.44973°W

- Interactive map of West LA Courthouse skate plaza
- Type: Skatepark
- Nearest city: Santa Monica
- Website: vision3music.com

The West Los Angeles Courthouse (West LA Courthouse) is a street skateboarding spot in Santa Monica, Los Angeles County, California. Once an illicit skate spot, this location became a public skatepark. Nike Skateboarding hosted a "Go Skateboarding Day" event in 2014 that led to a chain of events in which local skatepark advocates worked with the city to convert the space into a legal skate spot. Now, it exists as an aesthetically unique and historically rich skatepark, combining both the angular aesthetics of the courthouse's original design with a vibrant paint job that changes occasionally and a mural that also sees changes to mark contests or holidays in the skateboarding community.

== History ==
=== Illicit times and pre-2014 era ===
In the 1990s, the West Los Angeles Courthouse, originally part of the Los Angeles County Superior Court System, became a popular street skateboarding spot. In spite of it being strictly forbidden to skateboard on the court property, the ledges, at the perfect height for skateboarders to grind and slide, drew in professional skateboarders like Eric Koston, who made the spot famous through videos of their skateboarding that prominently featured the iconic spot. In spite of an increased security presence at the spot over the years, the spot only grew in popularity among skaters due to the infamous aura created by skate videos and the courthouse's unintentionally ideal skate terrain.

=== Nike SB purchase and post-2014 era ===
In 2013, the West LA Courthouse itself was closed down as part of budget cuts, but the local city council offices remained in use. Shoe brand Nike rented the space to do a one-day "Go Skateboarding Day" event there and paid for the ledges to be refinished for better skating. The ledges were slated to be knobbed the next day. Courthouse spot local Aaron Snyder worked with Stoner Skatepark Advocate Alec Beck and Neighborhood Council Chair Jay Handel to attempt to keep the skate spot from being knobbed in the hopes that the city could be convinced to turn the space into a community recreation asset—a legal skate spot. This group of local skaters worked out a deal with the city to make the space a legal skate spot, and for two months, while the deal was being negotiated, the city mandated that, as part of the agreement, nobody skate the park until the deal was finalized. Skater Alec Beck printed out pieces of paper stating "Wait! Don't blow it. If you grind through this paper, you are blowing it for everyone," on each of the ledges, and after two months, not one paper had been torn. As a result of the skate community coming together, the park was officially reopened as "West LA Courthouse Skate Plaza," by Nike Skateboarding in 2014.

=== Skatepark in jeopardy and future ===
In October 2018, California Governor Jerry Brown signed a bill into law that puts the courthouse up for sale, making it uncertain how much longer the space will remain a skate plaza.

In October 2020 at a Community Preview of the Development Proposals for the West LA Civic Center, it was revealed that neither development team plans to keep the fountain or site features that make up the current skate plaza.

== Culture ==
Culturally, this site is an important spot in street skateboarding. Immortalized in the 1990s by skateboarders like Eric Koston, in the 1993 skate video part "Goldfish," and Ronnie Creager, in the 1996 skate video part "Trilogy," these videos both defined early street skateboarding style as being focused on technical prowess and creativity in interacting with the urban environment as well as established this courthouse plaza, with its perfect ledges, as the mecca for any skateboarder trying to film a video part and make a name in a growing industry. One ledge in particular is very high off the ground, and getting any trick at all onto this platform, let alone a technical trick like a kickflip or 360 flip, would instantly give a skateboarder clout and recognition within the skateboarding culture. The illegality of skateboarding at this location helped establish the "skaters vs. authorities" mentality that blossomed from 90s skate culture. By establishing this location as a legal skate location in 2014, the location paradoxically became what skaters had wanted for decades: free to skate, but now a corporately owned, defined, and limited skatepark. Many skaters consider this a violation of skate culture and do not agree with being relegated to one space, believing instead that the entire city is their rightful skate domain.

== Aesthetics ==
The West LA Courthouse plaza had a rectangular fountain, ledges in squares around trees, and a wavy, stage-like area. These features are unintentionally perfect for street skateboarding, and after Nike SB's purchase in 2014, the ledges were painted vibrant colors like red, blue, and yellow, and these ledges are painted every few months or when there is a contest or special event. The most aesthetically significant aspect of the plaza following 2014 is the mural behind the stage. This mural, like the ledges, is painted whenever there is an event. For example, for the plaza's opening in 2014, the mural was decorated with a variety of different abstract shapes, skateboards, and human figures, and for Go Skateboarding Day in June 2015, the mural was decorated with a depiction of a skateboarder, having fallen flat on his face. These murals give the plaza personality and are a visual reminder of how skater control over the location has changed.
