= Amelia Brodka =

Polish-American skateboarder

Personal information
- Native name: Amelia Bródka (Polish)
- Born: 18 August 1989 (age 37) Nowa Sarzyna, Poland
- Education: University of Southern California
- Occupations: Professional skateboarder; President of Exposure Skate
- Spouse: Alec Beck
- Website: ameliabrodka.com

Sport
- Country: Poland
- Sport: Skateboarding
- Events: Park, vert, bowl
- Turned pro: 2009

Amelia Brodka (Polish: Amelia Bródka; born 18 August 1989) is a Polish-American professional skateboarder, coach, and president of Exposure Skate Organization. A two-time European Park Skateboarding Champion, she qualified to compete in the inaugural women's park event at the Olympic Games.

== Career ==
Brodka was born and raised in Nowa Sarzyna, Poland and emigrated with her family to New Jersey in 1996. She began skateboarding when she was 12 years old and was further inspired to seriously pursue the sport after seeing women compete in skateboarding events at the 2002 X Games in Philadelphia.

When she began competing in professional skateboarding events in 2009, she noticed a clear lack of opportunities and visibility for women and girls in the sport. Her senior thesis at the University of Southern California, Underexposed: A Women's Skateboarding Documentary, aimed to shine a light on the gender disparities within the sport. The documentary went on to receive honorable mentions at several American film festivals.

Brodka has ranked well in international vert, park, and bowl competitions for the past decade. Notable results include third place at the 2017 World Vert Championships, first place in the 2017 and 2018 European Park Championships, second place in the 2017 Australian Bowl Championships and first place at the 2020 Polish Park Skateboarding Championships. Her skateboarding has earned her a pro model skateboard on Arbor Skateboards, pro wheel on Speedlab Wheels, and one of skateboarding's first-ever spots on Team Visa. Brodka is not only an athlete, she also advocates for gender equality through documentary film making, activism, and charitable work.

== Personal life ==
Brodka holds a bachelor's degree from the University of Southern California in communications and narrative studies. She lives in Vista, California with her husband, American skateboarder Alec Beck.
