= Farallon Capital =

American investment management firm

Farallon Capital Management

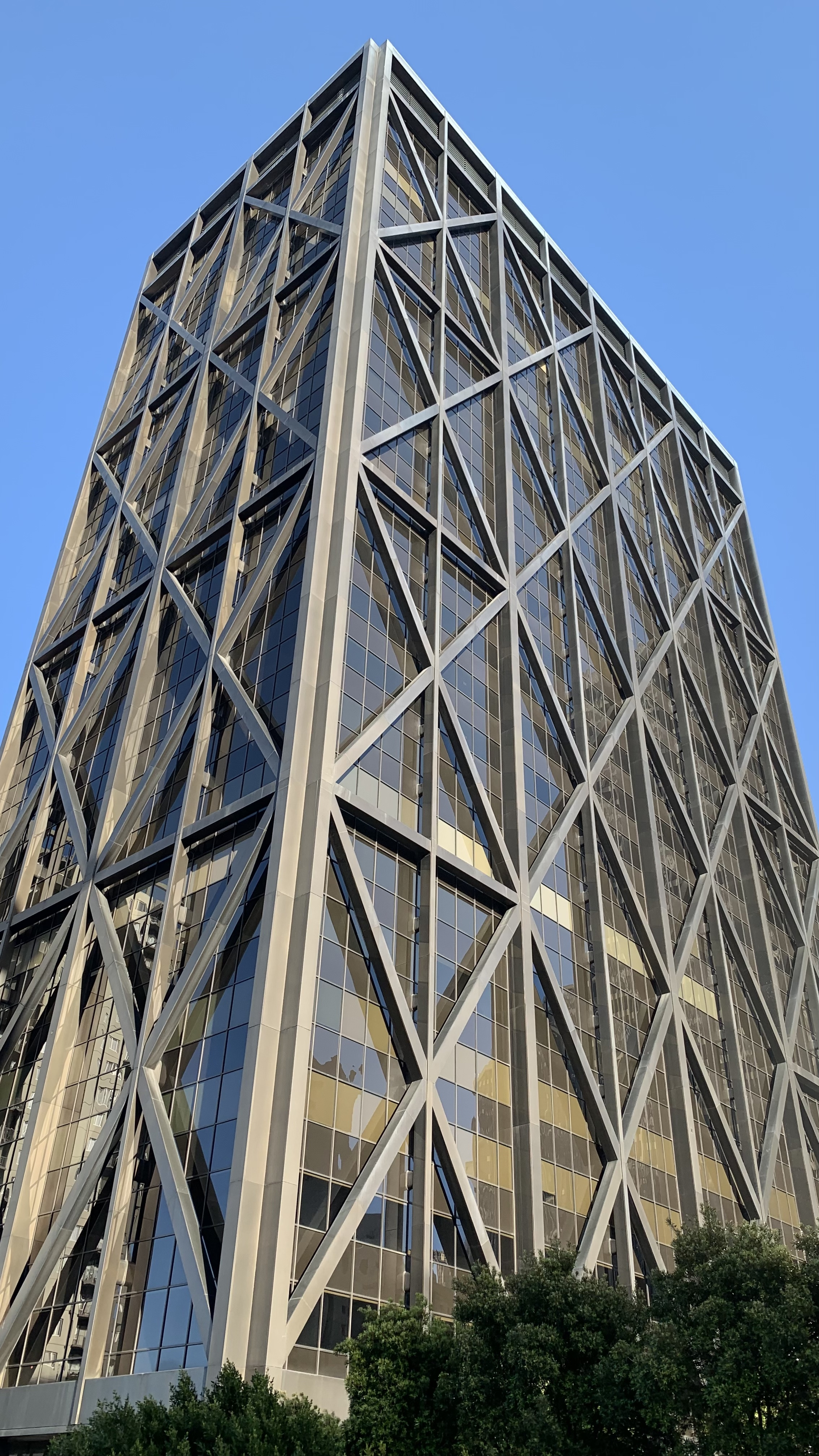
- Headquarters at One Maritime Plaza
- Type: Limited partnership
- Industry: Hedge fund
- Founded: January 1986; 40 years ago
- Founder: Tom Steyer
- Headquarters: One Maritime Plaza; San Francisco, California, U.S.
- Area served: Worldwide
- Key people: Nicolas Giauque (Managing Partner)
- AUM: US$ 42 billion (as of June 1, 2025)
- Number of employees: 230+ (2021)
- Website: faralloncapital.com

Farallon Capital Management, L.L.C. is an American multi-strategy hedge fund headquartered in San Francisco, California. Founded by Tom Steyer in 1986, the firm employs approximately 230 people in eight countries around the world.

Farallon primarily manages capital for university endowments, foundations, and high-net-worth individuals. The company manages assets reportedly worth $39 billion.

== History ==
Farallon was founded by Tom Steyer in January 1986 with $15 million in seed capital. Before starting Farallon, Steyer had worked for San Francisco-based private equity firm Hellman & Friedman, as a risk arbitrage trader under Robert Rubin at Goldman Sachs, and in Morgan Stanley's corporate mergers and acquisitions department.

Farallon was one of the first hedge funds to raise money from a university endowment. In 1987, Steyer, who received his bachelor's degree from Yale, approached the university's endowment to allocate funds for Farallon to manage. The Yale endowment declined based on the fees charged by Farallon. David Swensen, Yale's chief investment officer, later arranged with Tom Steyer that Farallon would initially manage an allocation of the Yale endowment for no fee. After Yale's investment proved to be lucrative, many other college endowments and pensions began to invest in hedge funds.

== Investment strategy ==
Farallon claims to have pioneered absolute return investing, a model focusing on potential returns as well as risk adjusted returns. Farallon invests in various asset classes including value investments, credit investments, merger arbitrage, real estate related investments, and direct investments in both developed and emerging markets. As of 2005, Farallon reportedly holds positions anywhere from two to five years.

According to Institutional Investor's Alpha, Steyer considers "himself as a research-oriented fundamental investor, not a trader."

Farallon also practices "event driven" international investing, finding distressed international companies and helping the businesses restructure. In 1999, Farallon bought a direct stake in an Argentine shoe company, which helped stabilize profitability as Argentina recovered from an economic crisis.

In 2002, Farallon bought control of Bank Central Asia (BCA), an Indonesian financial institution, for $531 million. At the time, many of Indonesia's banks were on the verge of collapse because of bad loans made during President Suharto's term and the country was seen as dangerous for foreign investment. Farallon sold its stake for a profit in 2006.

In the year before Farallon's investment in Indonesia, $286 million flowed into the country as foreign direct investment. After Farallon exited, that number grew to $1 billion in 2007 and $4 billion in 2008.

In March 2010, Farallon announced plans to refocus its investing on risk arbitrage and credit wagers and lessen its equity exposure. In addition, the firm said it would disclose more information to clients to "foster a more open culture at the hedge fund."

== Investment history ==
In 2007, Farallon in partnership with Simon Property Group and other hedge funds purchased Mills Corp, a real estate investment trust.

The fund is one of the largest shareholders in Japanese electronics company Toshiba, with a stake of more than 6 percent. Farallon is also one of the top-10 shareholders in Acceleron Pharma.

== Company ==
In 2006, it was reported that Farallon Capital was the largest hedge fund in the world in 2005. Steyer named the firm after the Farallon Islands off the coast of the San Francisco Bay Area.

=== Structure ===
Nicolas Giauque acts as the firm's Managing Partner. Giauque was promoted to the position when Andrew J.M. Spokes stepped down in 2025. Spokes was promoted to the position in 2012 when Steyer separated from the firm. Prior to his promotion, Spokes oversaw portfolio management and strategy for Farallon exclusive subadviser Noonday Global Management. Spokes opened Farallon's first international office in London in 1998.

Today, Farallon has 27 principals, 49 managing directors, and 35 investment professionals who oversee the firm's day-to-day operations and management.

=== Offices ===
Farallon operates offices in San Francisco, São Paulo, Tokyo, Singapore, London, Hong Kong.

== See also ==
- Hedge fund
- Risk arbitrage
- Tom Steyer
