= EZ-7 =

Skate-spot in Houston, Texas

Coordinates: 29.833774516867223°N 95.45347293480296°W

EZ-7 is a famous skate-spot located in Houston, Texas, USA. The EZ-7 is easily recognized by its large amount of graffiti covering the drainage ditch. As described in a 1985 article:

EZ-7 is unique. It has that added concrete extension and an adjoining ditch to soak your board in.

It is actually a drainage ditch located in northwestern Houston. It has been used by skateboarders since the early 1970s and has gained in popularity. Eventually a skate park, named the Watonga Skate Park was built on the adjacent property as part of Watonga Park. It is the location of the annual "Turkey Jam", which is a skateboarding jam session held during the week of Thanksgiving. It has been held annually at the EZ-7 since 1983.
