= James Roberts (Australian soccer) =

Australian athlete

James "Jim" Roberts is an Australian sports and recreation advocate, former association football player, and former coach of the Australia national futsal team.

== Coaching career ==
In 1987, Roberts and Charles Perkins AO devised the first Aboriginal Futsal Cup with Canada and Roberts coached the first Australian Aboriginal indoor soccer select team. Roberts went on to coach the Australian national futsal team from 1992 until 2000. Under his stewardship, the team qualified for and competed at the 1992 FIFA Futsal World Championship in Hong Kong, the 1996 FIFA Futsal World Championship in Spain, and the 2000 FIFA Futsal World Championship in Guatemala. At the time of his retirement from coaching in 2000, he was one of only four national team coaches in history to have participated in three FIFA futsal world cups. The national team played 66 games under his leadership.

== Sport and recreation advocacy ==
In 1985, Roberts became President of ACT Sports House, a position that he held until 2003. Under his presidency, ACT Sports House became ACTSport, the peak industry body for sport in the Australian Capital Territory. In 2011 Roberts was once again president of ACTSport, and was still in the position in September 2013.

== Awards and honours ==
In 2000, Roberts was awarded the Australian Sports Medal for his contribution to the development of sport and recreation in the Australian Capital Territory, his community service as president of ACT Sports House (later ACTSport) and for services to futsal. Also in 2000, he was presented with an achievement award by the Brazilian Futsal Confederation for his contribution to the development of futsal throughout the world. In 2010 Roberts was inducted into the ACT Sport Hall of Fame and has been inducted into the ACT Football Federation Hall of Fame.
