= One Maritime Plaza =

Office tower in San Francisco's Financial District

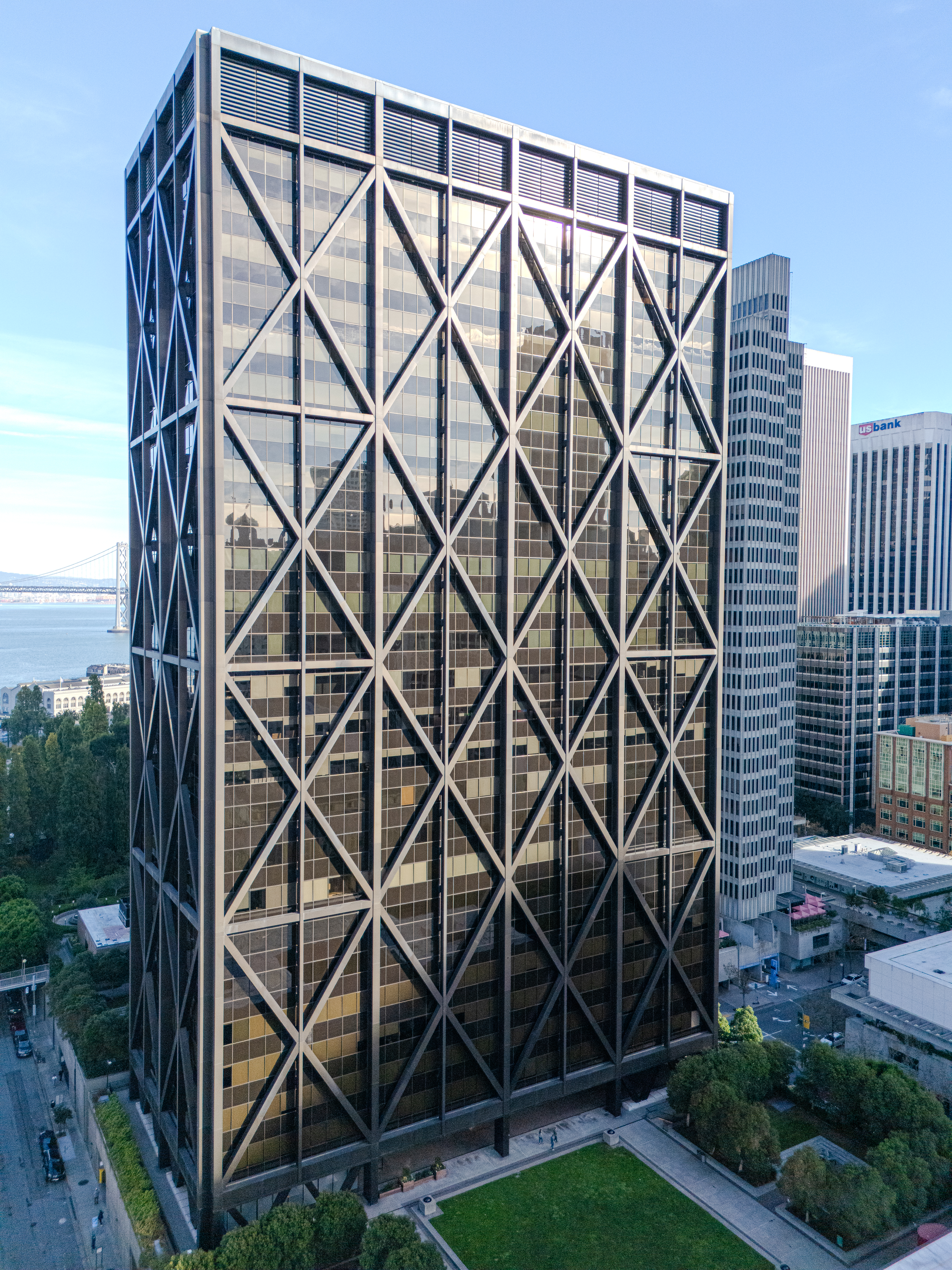
- One Maritime Plaza in 2025

- Location within San Francisco

General information
- Type: Office
- Location: 300 Clay Street; San Francisco
- Coordinates: 37°47′44″N 122°23′57″W
- Completed: 1967; 59 years ago

Height
- Roof: 121.3 m (398 ft)

Technical details
- Floor count: 27

Design and construction
- Architect: Skidmore, Owings & Merrill

Website
- onemaritimeplaza.com

One Maritime Plaza is an office tower located in San Francisco's Financial District near the Embarcadero Center towers on Clay and Front Streets. The building, built as the Alcoa Building for Alcoa Corporation and completed in 1967, stands 121 m (398 feet) and has 25 floors of office space. It is surrounded by Maritime Plaza, an elevated public park finished in 1967. This is one of the earliest buildings to use seismic bracing in the form of external trusses and X-braces.

== Tenants ==
In December 2018, Google signed a deal to lease 190,000 sqft of this building.

- CVC Capital Partners
- Farallon Capital
- Cowen Group
- Skidmore, Owings & Merrill

== See also ==
- List of tallest buildings in San Francisco
