= Sue Bierman =

American politician (1924–2006)

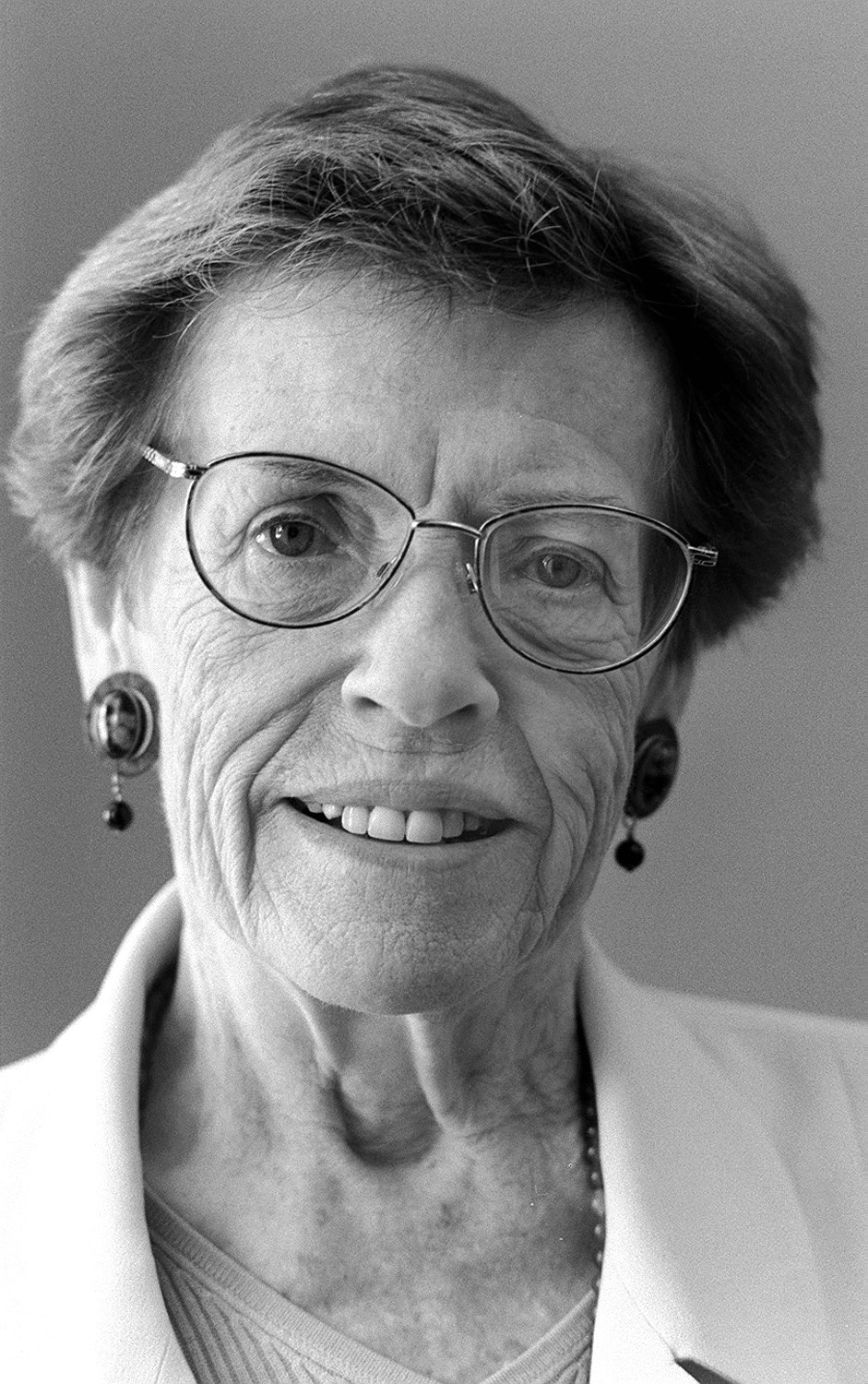

Member of the San Francisco Port Commission
- In office 2003–2006
- Mayor: Gavin Newsom; Willie Brown

Member of the San Francisco Board of Supervisors
- In office 1993–2000
- Preceded by: Harry Britt
- Succeeded by: District abolished

Member of the San Francisco Planning Commission
- In office 1976–1992

Personal details
- Born: August 5, 1924; Fremont, Nebraska, U.S.
- Died: August 7, 2006 (aged 82); San Francisco, California, U.S.
- Spouse: Arthur K. Bierman

Sue Bierman (August 5, 1924 – August 7, 2006) was a civic leader in San Francisco, serving on the San Francisco Planning Commission, the Board of Supervisors, and the Port Commission.

Born in Fremont, Nebraska, she moved to San Francisco in the 1950s with her husband Arthur K. Bierman. She became active in city politics as a leader of the "freeway revolt" of the 1960s, an effort to stop the expansion of the Interstate 80 freeway into the Golden Gate Park Panhandle. In 1964, she formed a council in her Haight-Ashbury neighborhood to campaign against the proposed "Panhandle Freeway". The expansion was halted in March 1966 when the Board of Supervisors voted 6–5 against it.

Her reputation as a neighborhood activist and co-founder of the Haight-Ashbury Neighborhood Council led to her appointment by Mayor George Moscone to the San Francisco Planning Commission in 1976. She served on the commission until 1992, and afterwards ran successfully for the Board of Supervisors on a platform of housing the homeless, protecting the health budget and preserving open space. She remained a Supervisor until required by term limits to step down in 2000. Her final civic position was on the Port Commission, where she was appointed by Willie Brown in 2003, reappointed by Gavin Newsom, and served until her death in 2006. The Susan J. Bierman Grove in the Golden Gate Park Panhandle and Sue Bierman Park in the Financial District are named in her honor.
