= Raoul Wallenberg Traditional High School =

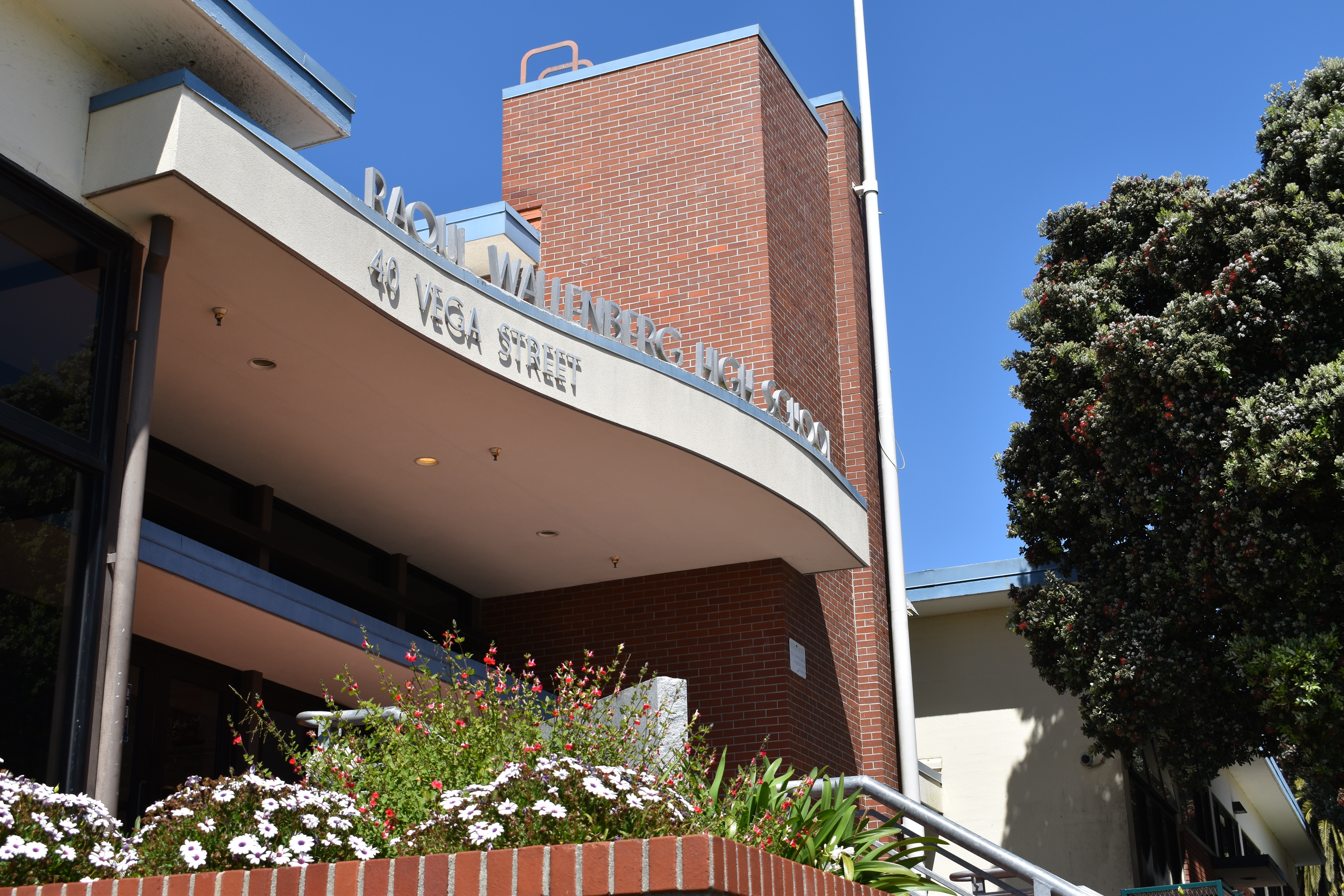
- Main entrance on Vega St.

Location
- 40 Vega St; San Francisco, California, 94118; 37°46′48.86″N 122°26′46.82″W

Information
- Established: 1981
- Superintendent: Maria Su
- Principal: Tanya Harris
- Staff: 26.77 (FTE)
- Enrollment: 551 (2023–2024)
- Student to teacher ratio: 20.58
- Campus: Urban
- Colors: Blue, White, and Columbia Blue
- Teams: Wallenberg Bulldogs
- Website: www.sfusd.edu/school/raoul-wallenberg-high-school

Raoul Wallenberg Traditional High School is a high school in the San Francisco Unified School District in San Francisco, California, US. It was founded in 1981 in honor of the Swedish architect, businessman, diplomat, and humanitarian Raoul Wallenberg. In recognition of its namesake, the school's motto is "The individual can make a difference" and all students are required to complete at least 100 hours of community service before graduating.

== History ==
=== Land Development ===
The Wallenberg High School campus sits on the former site of the Lone Mountain Cemetery complex, specifically Calvary Cemetery, which was cleared for development.

=== Anza Elementary School (1952-1981) ===
In February 1946, the board of education voted to appropriate $87,000 to purchase land for an elementary school in the Anza neighborhood which was then being developed. Two years later, in 1948, San Francisco voters approved a bond measure for $48,890,000 which was used to renovate existing schools and build new ones, one of which became Anza Elementary School, built for $915,000, which opened on September 3, 1952. On May 12, 1981 the Board of Education voted to convert the school into a high school, a decision opposed by some Richmond residents in part because the change would eliminate a Japanese-English bilingual program afforded to over 200 students.

=== Raoul Wallenberg Traditional High School (1981-present) ===
On June 9, 1981 the school board voted to name the new high school after Raoul Wallenberg. On September 10, 1981 the school officially opened as Raoul Wallenberg Traditional High School. The descriptor "traditional" at the time referred to "'back-to-basics' schools because of their stress on academics and student discipline". Though traditional elementary schools existed in San Francisco, Wallenberg was the first high school to open with that distinction. The opening of these "traditional" schools was a strategy by SFUSD to combat the popularity of private schools as well as a response to criticism at the time that the district had misaligned priorities and had fallen behind on academic rigor. When it was opened the elementary school toilets and water fountains still had not been replaced to meet the needs of older students. The school was officially dedicated to Raoul Wallenberg on November 23, 1981 with Wallenberg's maternal half-sister, Nina Lagergren, and then Mayor Dianne Feinstein in attendance. This came just over a month after Wallenberg was posthumously granted honorary US citizenship.

== Campus ==
Situated in the north of the city, in the Western Addition district, the school spans several blocks bounded by O'Farrell Street to the north, Masonic Avenue to the west, Vega Street to the south, and Anza Vista Avenue to the east. Wallenberg High School is located in the Anza Vista neighborhood to the east of the University of San Francisco's Lone Mountain Campus. The school is directly accessible via the SFMTA's 31, 38, and 43 bus lines.

The campus includes a library, an art studio and music classroom, an auditorium, a computer lab, an indoor gymnasium with a court used for basketball, badminton and volleyball, a Wellness Center, and an outdoor weightlifting gym. The central patio is known as the "upper yard" and is home to the school's 3 garden areas and greenhouse. On the eastern side of campus is the annex building which was constructed in 2011.

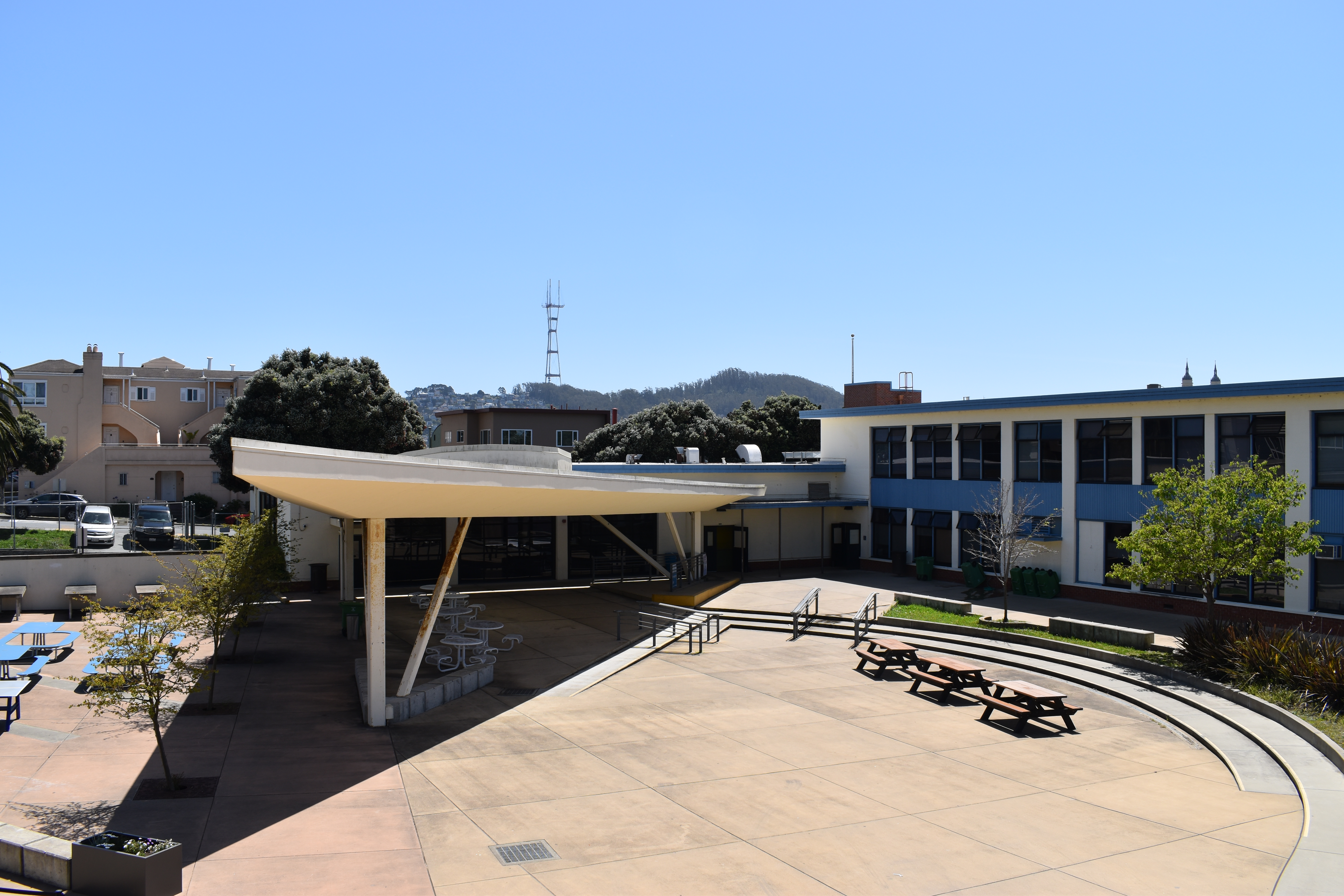
The upper yard facing south towards Sutro Tower

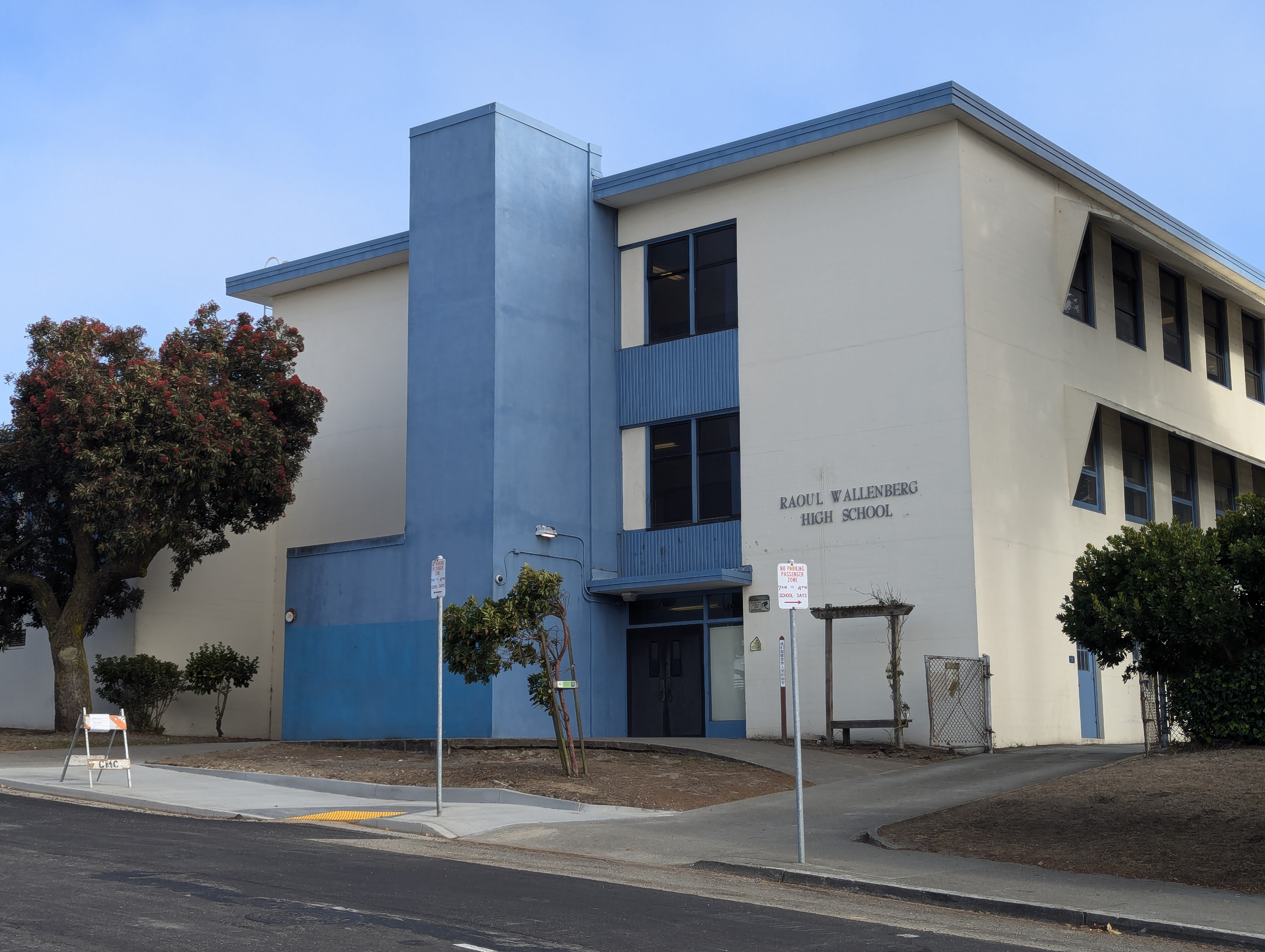
The north entrance on O'Farrell St.

== Academics and Class Structure ==
In the 2024-2025 school year students had the opportunity to choose from several Advanced Placement courses, including: Biology, Calculus AB, Computer Science Principles, English Literature & Composition, Environmental Science, Macroeconomics, Statistics, US Government and Politics, and US History.

The career and technical education pathways offered include: Biotechnology, Computer Science, and Environmental Science, Engineering, and Policy (ESEP).

Starting in school year 2026-27 the Academy of Arts & Sciences was no longer offered as a stand alone school due to an SFUSD resource alignment initiative. Consequently, Wallenberg High School absorbed the programs offered at The Academy including: a deaf and hard of hearing program, dual enrollment opportunities at City College of San Francisco, and opportunities to study at the Mission Bay Hub.

== Student Activities ==
=== Athletics ===
For the 2022-2023 school year, Wallenberg High School is a member of the California Interscholastic Federation in the following sports:

- Badminton (co-ed)
- Baseball (boys)
- Basketball (boys and girls)
- Cross country (co-ed)
- Flag football (girls)
- Golf (boys and girls)
- Soccer (boys and girls)
- Softball (girls)
- Swimming (co-ed)
- Tennis (boys and girls)
- Track and field (co-ed)
- Volleyball (boys and girls)

=== Clubs ===
As of the 2024-25 school year Wallenberg's clubs include: Acts of Random Kindness, Badminton Club, Charity Club, Cooking Club, Gaming Club, Gardening Club, Kaibigan, Psychology Pathways, Red Cross Club, Upcycling club, and Yarn Club. Clubs fundraise at Food Fests around campus throughout the year.

=== Events ===
At the end of the fall semester the school typically puts on a winter concert in the auditorium featuring student and teacher bands. Since 2014 Wallenberg has also put on Wallapalooza, a spring arts and music festival held towards the end of the school year.

== Demographics ==
Enrollment by Grade (2023-2024)
Category	% of Students	# of Students
9th	26.8	148
10th	24.3	134
11th	22.8	126
12th	25.9	143

Enrollment by Gender (2023-2024)
Category	% of Students	# of Students
Male	54.9	303
Female	45	248

Enrollment by Race/Ethnicity (2023-2024)
Category	% of Students	# of Students
American Indian/Alaska Native	0.01	1
Asian	40.29	222
Black	9.43	52
Hispanic	23.23	128
Native Hawaiian/Pacific Islander	0.05	3
White	16.15	89
Two or More Races	10.16	56

For the 2020-2021 school year, total minority enrollment was 83%, with 47% of the student body coming from an economically disadvantaged household.

== Academic indicators ==
The graduation rate in 2020-2021 was 93.5%, compared to district average of 58.2% and state average of 83.6%. In 2019-2020, 63% of graduates completed all of the courses required for University of California and California State University admission.

The dropout rate in 2020-2021 was 3.9%, compared to district average of 36.6% and state average of 9.4%. The school reported that 14.6% of students were chronically absent.

In the 2022 U.S. News & World Report rankings, 55% of Wallenberg students were considered proficient in mathematics (compared to 32% in the district and 30% in the state), 66% were proficient in reading (compared to 49% in the district and 60% in the state), and 45% were proficient in science (compared to 25% in the district and 30% in the state). 65% of 12th grade students took at least one Advanced Placement (AP) exam.

During the 2020-2021 school year, 83% of students said they felt the school provided a climate of support for academic learning. 74% felt safe at school and 58% reported a sense of belonging.

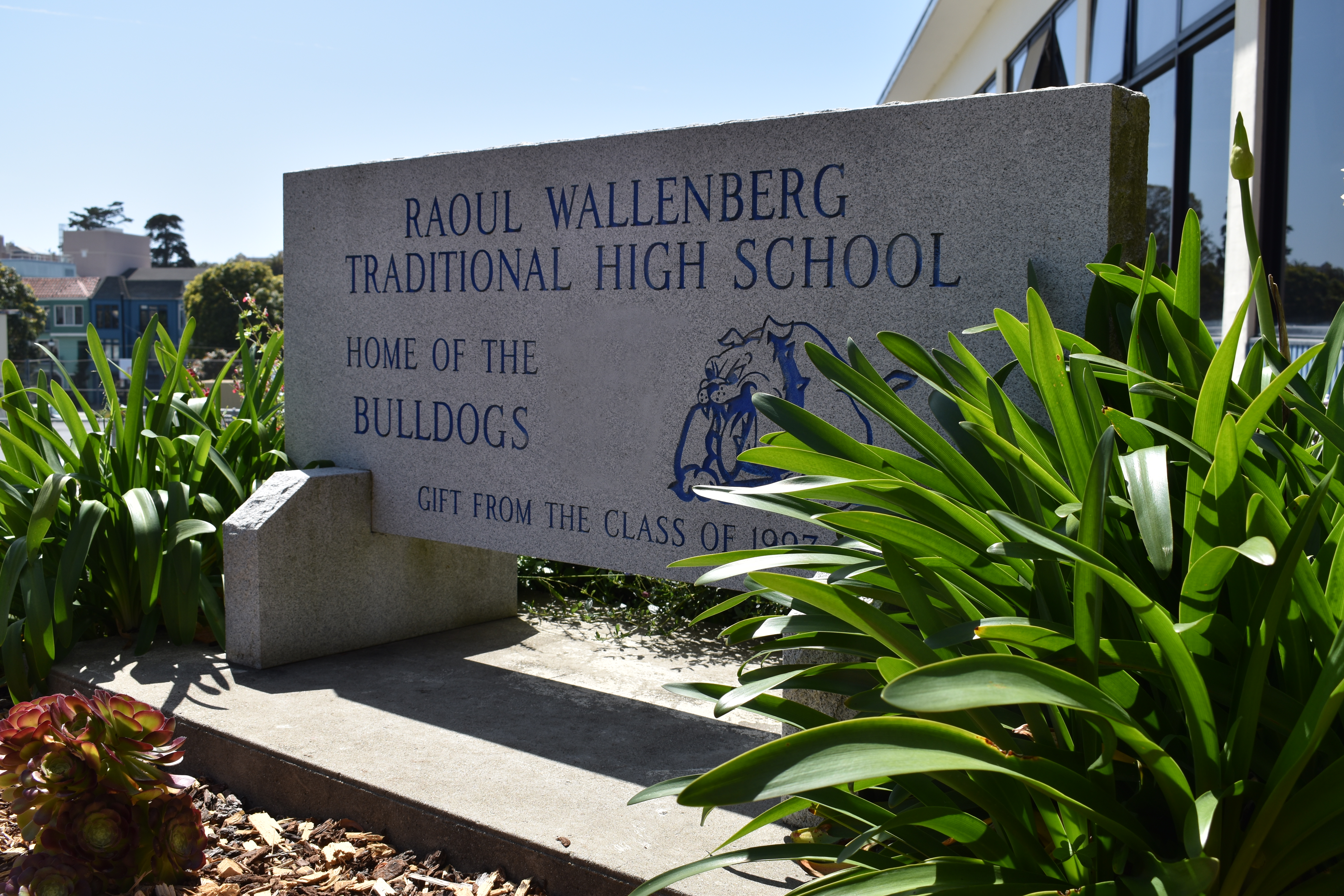
The sign at the front entrance of the school

== Notable alumni ==
- Coco Lee, singer, songwriter and actress
- Wisp, shoegaze musician

== See also ==
- Wallenberg Set
