= Martinez Playground =

Public park in Brooklyn, New York

- Blue Park
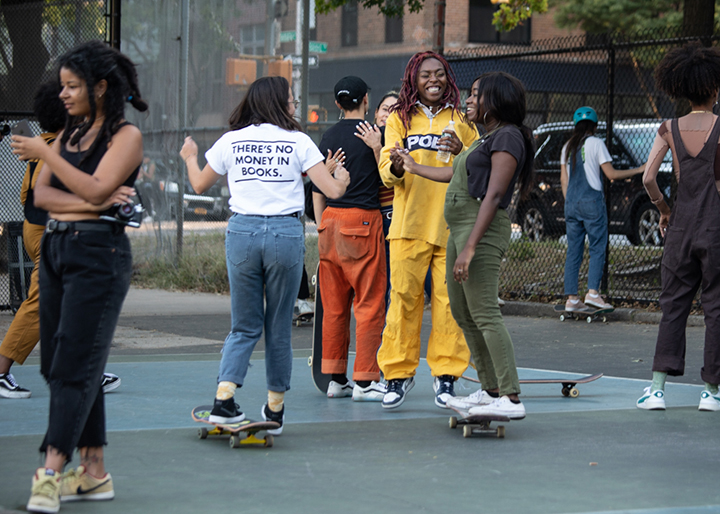
- Interactive map of Martinez Playground
- Type: Urban park
- Location: Williamsburg, Brooklyn, New York City
- Coordinates: 40.709091°N 73.944359°W
- Created: New York City Department of Parks and Recreation
- Open: All year
- Terrain: Concrete
- Public transit: New York City Subway: train at Montrose Avenue

Martinez Playground is a public park in Williamsburg, Brooklyn, New York City. It is located on Scholes Street between Manhattan and Graham Avenues.

== Origins ==
Martinez Playground honors Thelma Martinez (1918-1987), a life-long resident of New York City and a 30-year resident of the nearby Williamsburg Houses. Martinez' extensive work in the neighborhood included a special commitment to the park, formerly known as Williamsburg Playground.

On October 10, 1957 the City, in agreement with the New York City Housing Authority, leased the property to the New York City Department of Parks and Recreation to use for park and playground purposes.

== Facilities ==
- Basketball courts
- Bathrooms
- Handball courts
- Playgrounds
- Skateparks

== "Blue Park" Skatepark ==
The Martinez Playground Skate Park, known as Blue Park Skate Park or Blue Park, was built in 2012–2013 and features manual pads of different shapes and sizes in a basketball court. The obstacles were built by California Skateparks.

== Gallery ==
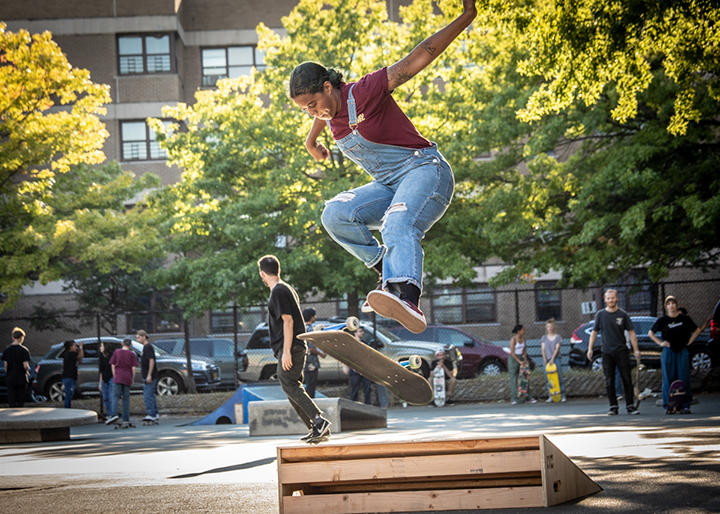

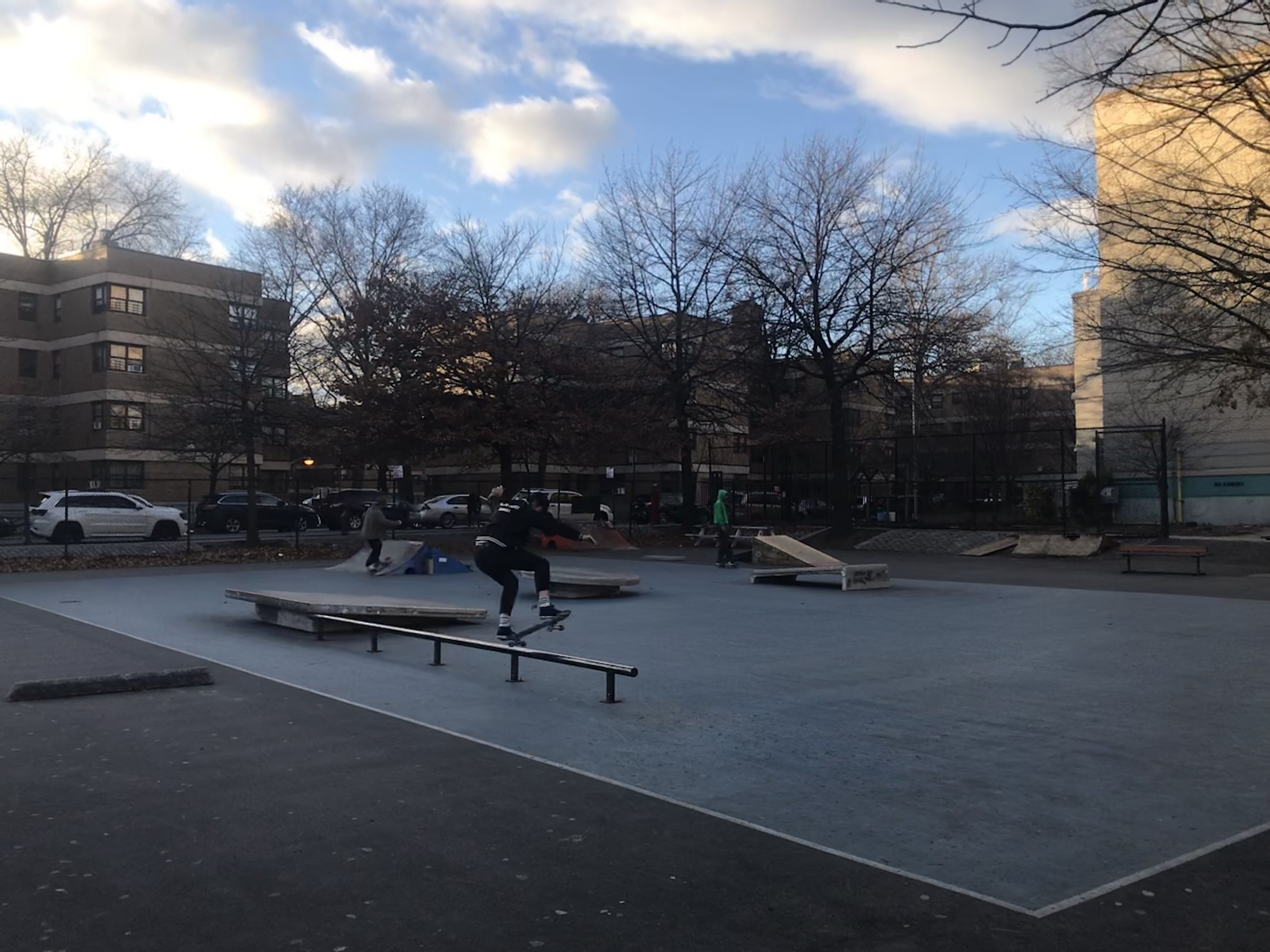

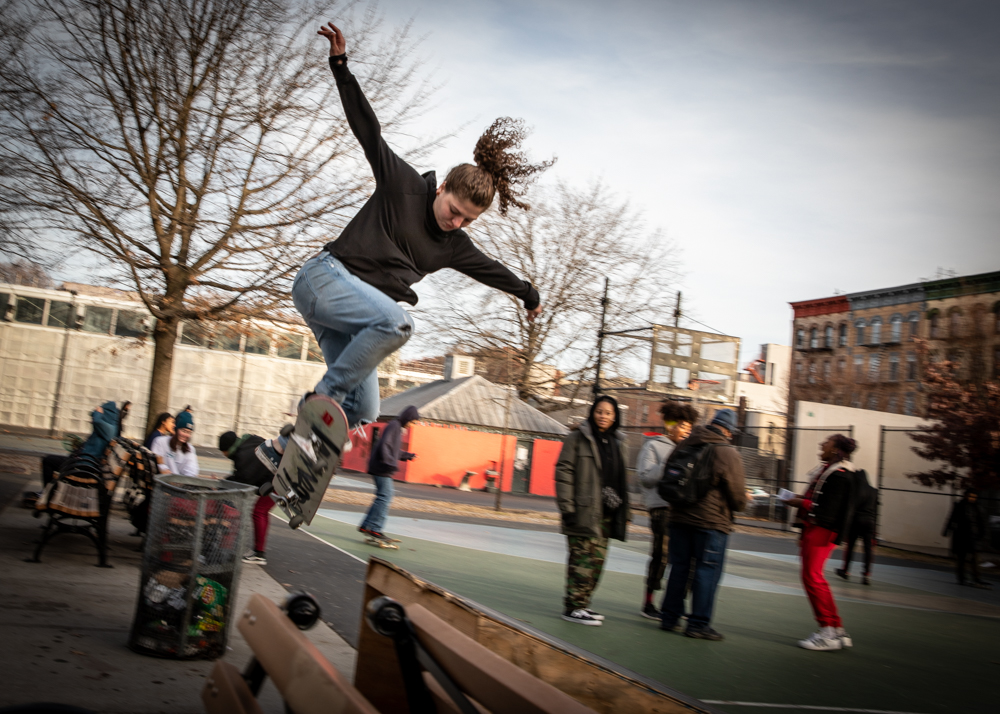

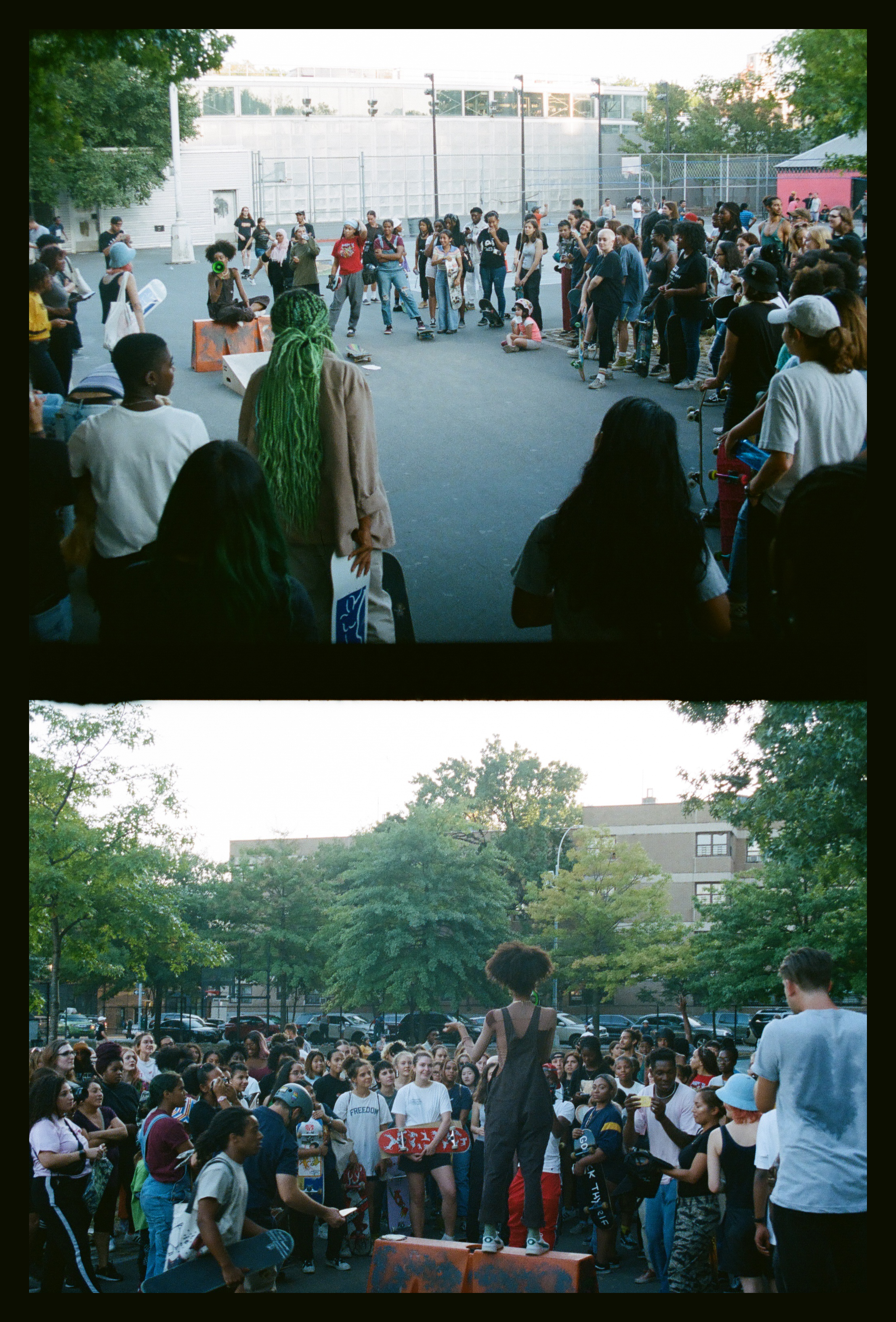
