= Ryan McGinness =

American painter (born 1972)

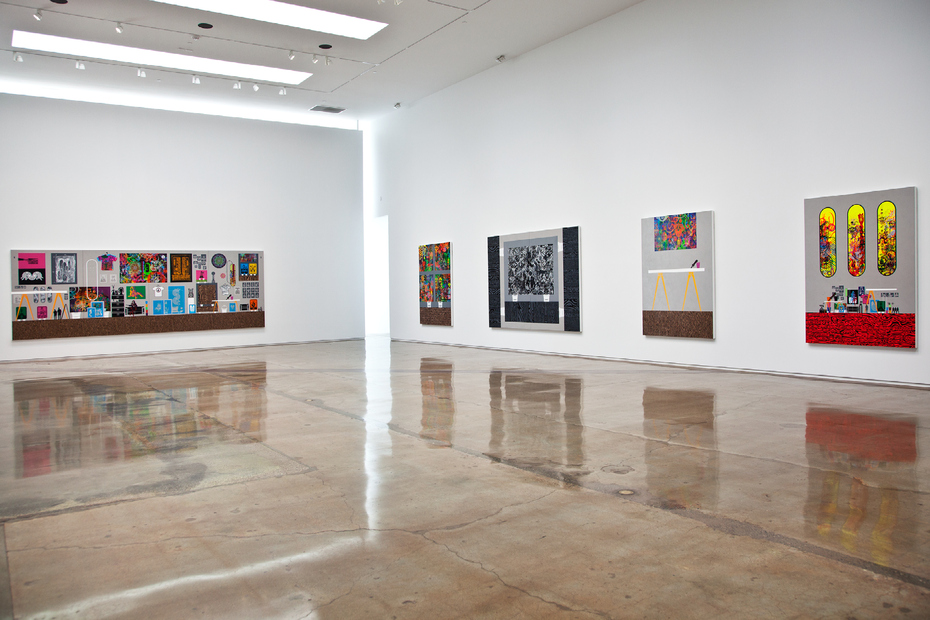

Ryan Joseph McGinness (born January 9, 1972) is an American artist, living and working in Manhattan, New York. Known for his original extensive vocabulary of graphic drawings which use the visual language of public signage, corporate logos, and contemporary iconography, McGinness creates paintings, sculptures, and environments. McGinness is interested in assuming the power of this anonymous aesthetic in order to share personal expressions. His work is in the permanent public collections of the Museum of Modern Art, Virginia Museum of Fine Arts, Museum of Contemporary Art San Diego, Cincinnati Art Museum, MUSAC in Spain, and the Misumi Collection in Japan.

== Early life and upbringing ==
McGinness grew up in the surf and skate culture of Virginia Beach, Virginia, an influence that is visible in much of his work. He then studied graphic design and fine art at Carnegie Mellon University in Pittsburgh, Pennsylvania as an Andrew Carnegie Scholar. During college, he interned at the Andy Warhol Museum as a curatorial assistant.

== Public Collections ==
- Albright-Knox Art Gallery, Buffalo, N.Y.
- AkzoNobel Art Foundation, Amsterdam
- Cincinnati Art Museum, Cincinnati, Ohio
- Columbus Museum of Art, Columbus, Ohio
- Cranbrook Art Museum, Bloomfield Hills, Mich.
- EMMA - Espoo Museum of Modern Art, Espoo, Finland
- Metropolitan Museum of Art, New York
- Mori Art Museum, Tokyo, Japan
- MUSAC, Museo de Arte Contemporáneo de Castilla y León, Leon, Spain
- Museum of Contemporary Art, San Diego, Calif.
- Museum of Contemporary Art, Tokyo, Japan
- Museum of Modern Art, New York
- New York Public Library, New York
- Saatchi Gallery, London
- Virginia Museum of Fine Arts, Richmond, Va.

== Books ==
- "Everything Is Everywhere", 2014, ISBN 978-94-91727-26-9
- "Sketchbook Selections", 2000–2012, 2013, ISBN 978-1-58423-470-8
- Women: New (Re)presentations, 2013, ISBN 978-0-615-72511-6
- Studio Franchise, 2010, Published by La Casa Encendia, ISBN 978-84-96917-63-7
- Studio Manual, 2010, Published by La Casa Encendida, ISBN 978-84-96917-62-0
- Ryan McGinness Works., 2009, Published by Rizzoli, ISBN 978-0-8478-3196-8
- No Sin/No Future, 2008, Published by Gingko Press, ISBN 978-1-58423-330-5
- Aesthetic Comfort, 2008, Published by Arkitip,
- Installationview, 2005, Published by Rizzoli, ISBN 0-8478-2721-6
- Multiverse, 2005, Published by Galerie du Jour, ISBN 2-906496-44-8
- Project Rainbow, 2003, Published by Gingko Press, ISBN 1-58423-163-7
- Sponsorship, 2003, Published by Anthem Press & BLK/MRKT, Second Edition Published by Gingko Press, ISBN 1-58423-199-8
- Gasbook, 2002, Published by Gas Exchange, ISBN 4-86083-189-6
- Pieceofmind, 2001, Published by Colette, ISBN 978-2-9516533-1-3
- Vocabularytest, 2001, Published by Joseph Silvestro Gallery, ISBN 0-9713799-0-4
- Luxurygood, 2000, Published by Alife,
- Flatnessisgod, 1999, Published by RSUB, ISBN 1-887128-34-4
