= Brooklyn Banks =

Skate spot in Manhattan, New York

Coordinates: 40.70995°N 74.00144°W

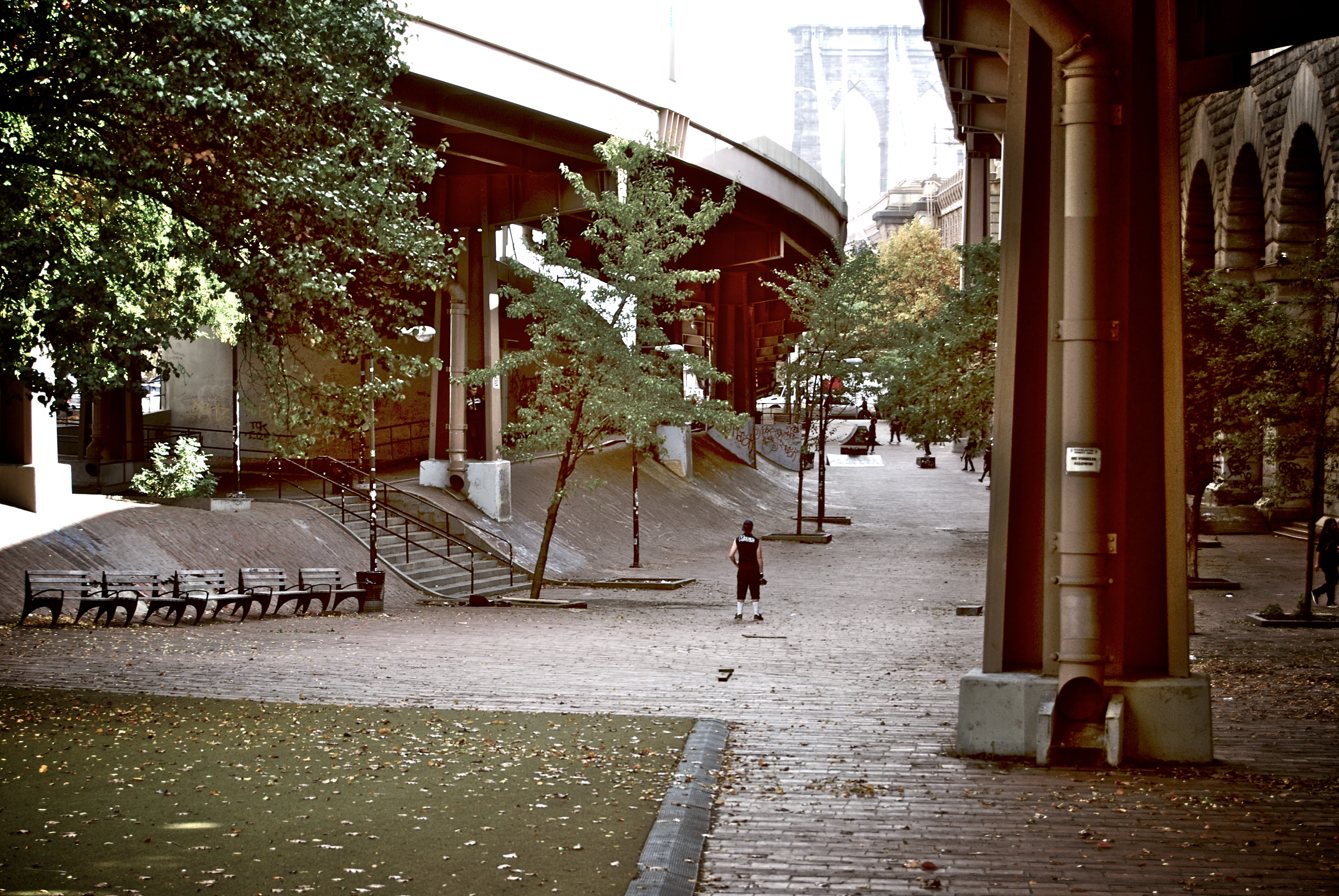
The lower banks as seen in 2009

Brooklyn Banks (officially known as Gotham Park) is an area under the Manhattan side of the Brooklyn Bridge in New York City. The banks are a skate spot popular among skateboarders and BMXers for the unique brick banked surfaces that give the spot its name, and other skateable features such as benches, pillars, ledges, stairs, and handrails.

The banks have been referred to as "New York City's most famous skateboarding spot" and "the Mecca of New York skateboarding" by the New York Times.

The skateboarding community has rallied to save the banks from destruction on multiple occasions.

== Architectural history ==
Originally an area used for the construction of the Brooklyn Bridge, the banks abut large vaults under the bridge's anchorage that had been used as wine cellars in the 19th century and a Cold War era bunker to store emergency survival supplies in the case of a nuclear attack.

After the removal of trolley lines from the bridge in the 1950, land was cleared for additional exit ramps for cars to be constructed on the Manhattan end. In 1972, the space under the ramp supports was reclaimed as part of the larger 1 Police Plaza development project. Parks Commissioner Henry Stern independently declared the area a park by installing a wooden sign that read "Red Brick Park."

The distinctive wavelike banked surfaces were designed by landscape architect M. Paul Friedberg, who later said of his design "it was not with the intent of creating a recreational area… but it's interesting that it became that. What is fascinating to me is how we interpret our environment, how we use our imagination to do things, involve ourselves in activities that were not intended." Justin Davidson, architectural critic for Curbed, wrote that the banks were "bleak by design".

== Skateboarding ==
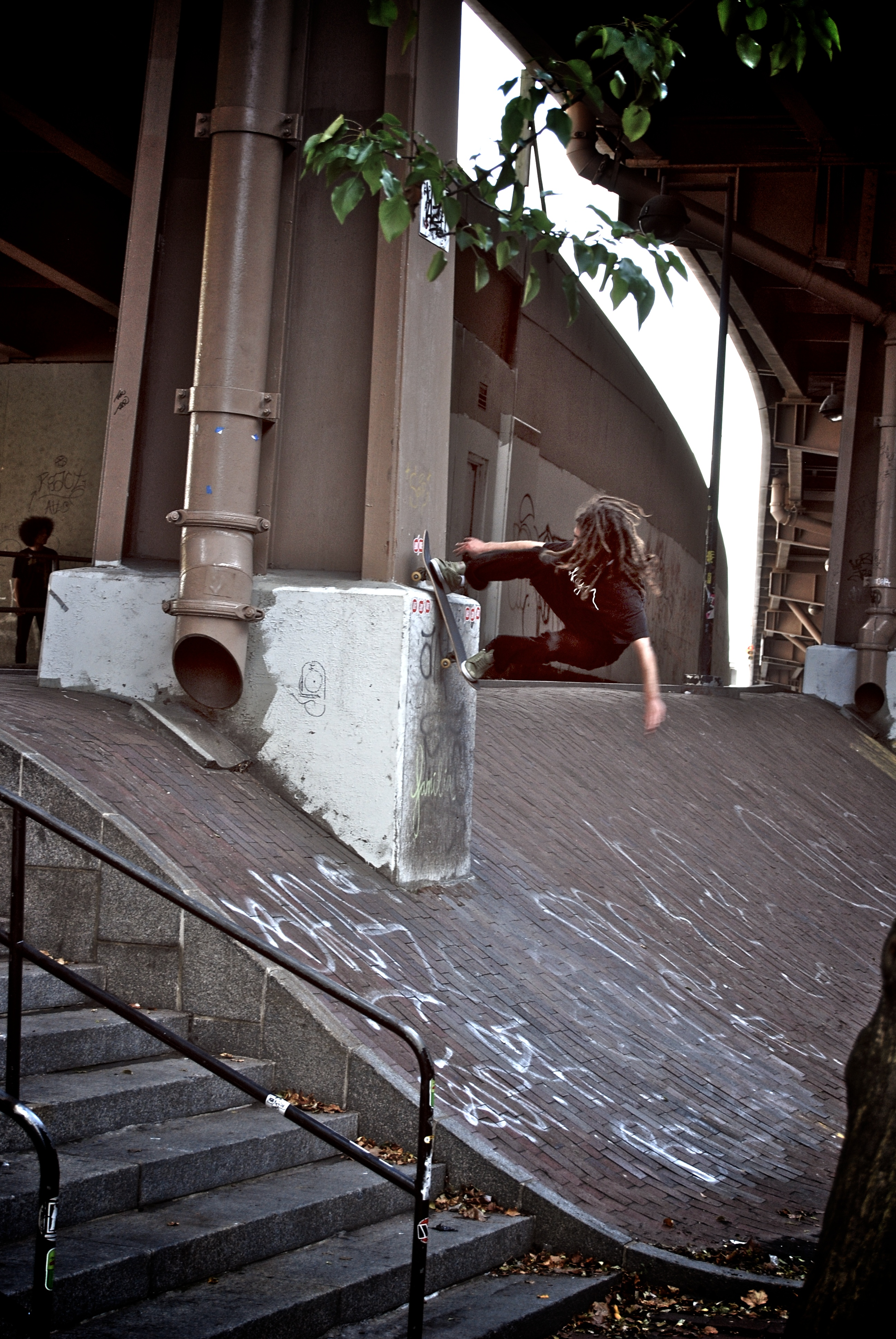
A skateboarder at the banks in 2009

From the mid-1980s onward, significantly before any skateparks were built in New York City, the Brooklyn Banks provided one of the only banked skateable areas in the city. The banks remained a major meet up spot for Downtown skateboarders for the next two decades.

In 2001, the September 11 attacks on the nearby World Trade Center caused access to the banks to be temporarily shut down, although skaters were allowed to return almost immediately, even when the area remained closed to others. The city soon started using the area for weekday parking, limiting the usable hours for skateboarding.

New York City began renovations on the spot in 2004, destroying the little banks in the process, and planning to turn the area into a green park. Skateboarder and community organizer Steve Rodriguez successfully organized skateboarders to lobby the New York City to save the larger banks for skateboarding in 2005. The New York City Department of Parks and Recreation agreed on a redesign for the area would result in what Parks Commissioner Adrian Benepe deemed a "skateboard-friendly park."

Five years later, in 2010, New York City turned the space into storage for a major restoration and repair project for the bridge. This effectively closed the area skateboarders had used for over twenty years. In 2016, a petition to re-open the banks was circulated with 21,718 signatures collected.

In 2020, after the New York City Department of Transportation removed all the bricks from the flat ground area, the skateboard community feared the big banks themselves would be next. Over the next three years, a new petition to reopen the banks to skateboarding gathered over 53,000 signatures. Local resident Rosa Chang established the nonprofit organization Gotham Park in 2021 to lead efforts to renovate the space. With the organizing and lobbying of Rodriguez once again, the park was partially reopened on May 24, 2023, the 140th anniversary of the opening of the Brooklyn Bridge, as part of a planned redesign that would specifically keep skateboarding in mind, rebuild the small banks, and reopen the big banks.

Rodriguez, along with Mayor Eric Adams and the not-for-profit organization Gotham Park, announced that the big banks had reopened to the public on June 5, 2025, after 15 years of closure. Adams also allocated $50 million to rebuild the space. As of 2026, the reconstruction is planned to begin during fiscal year 2028.

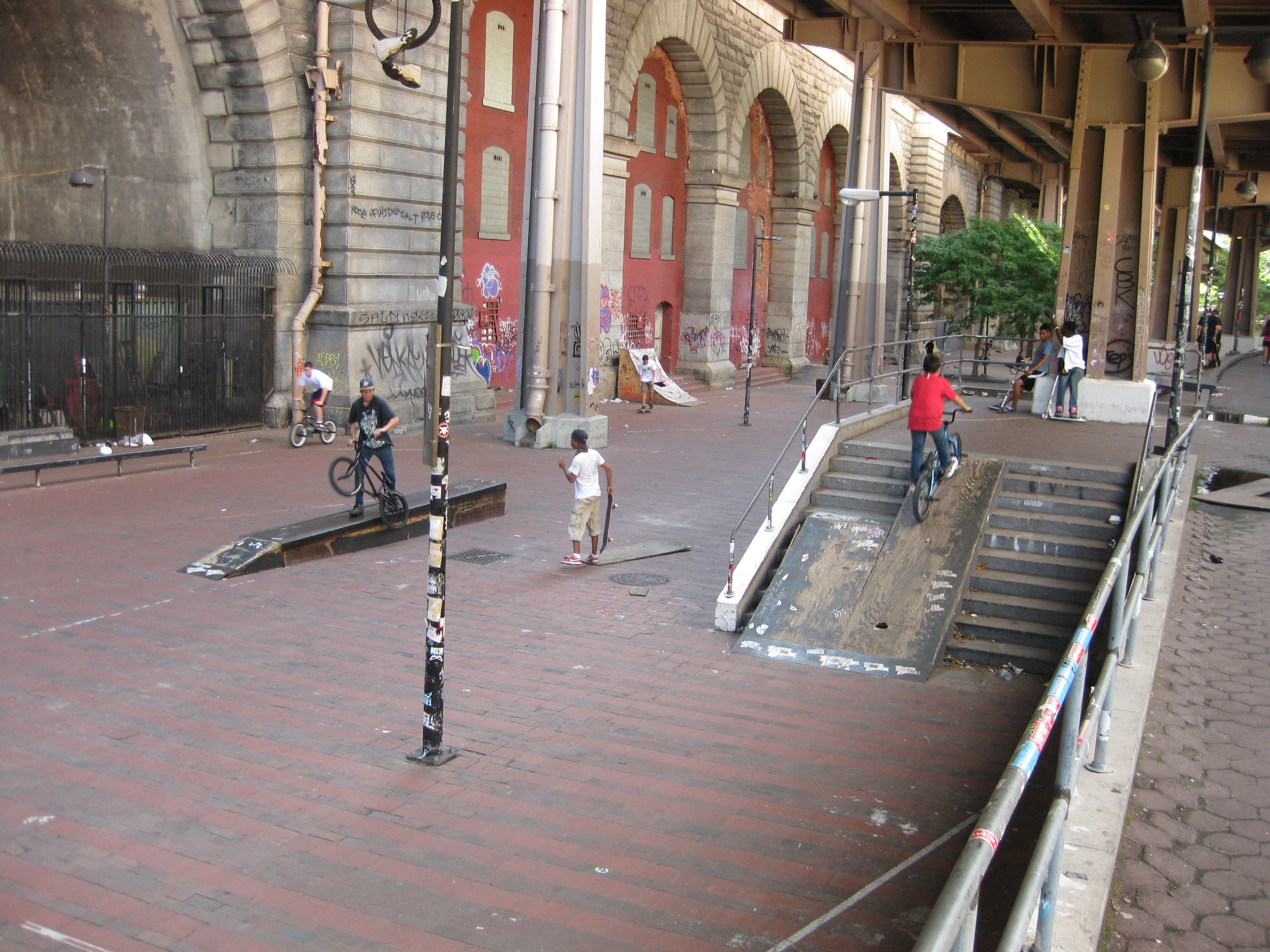
The banks during their skatepark era in 2009

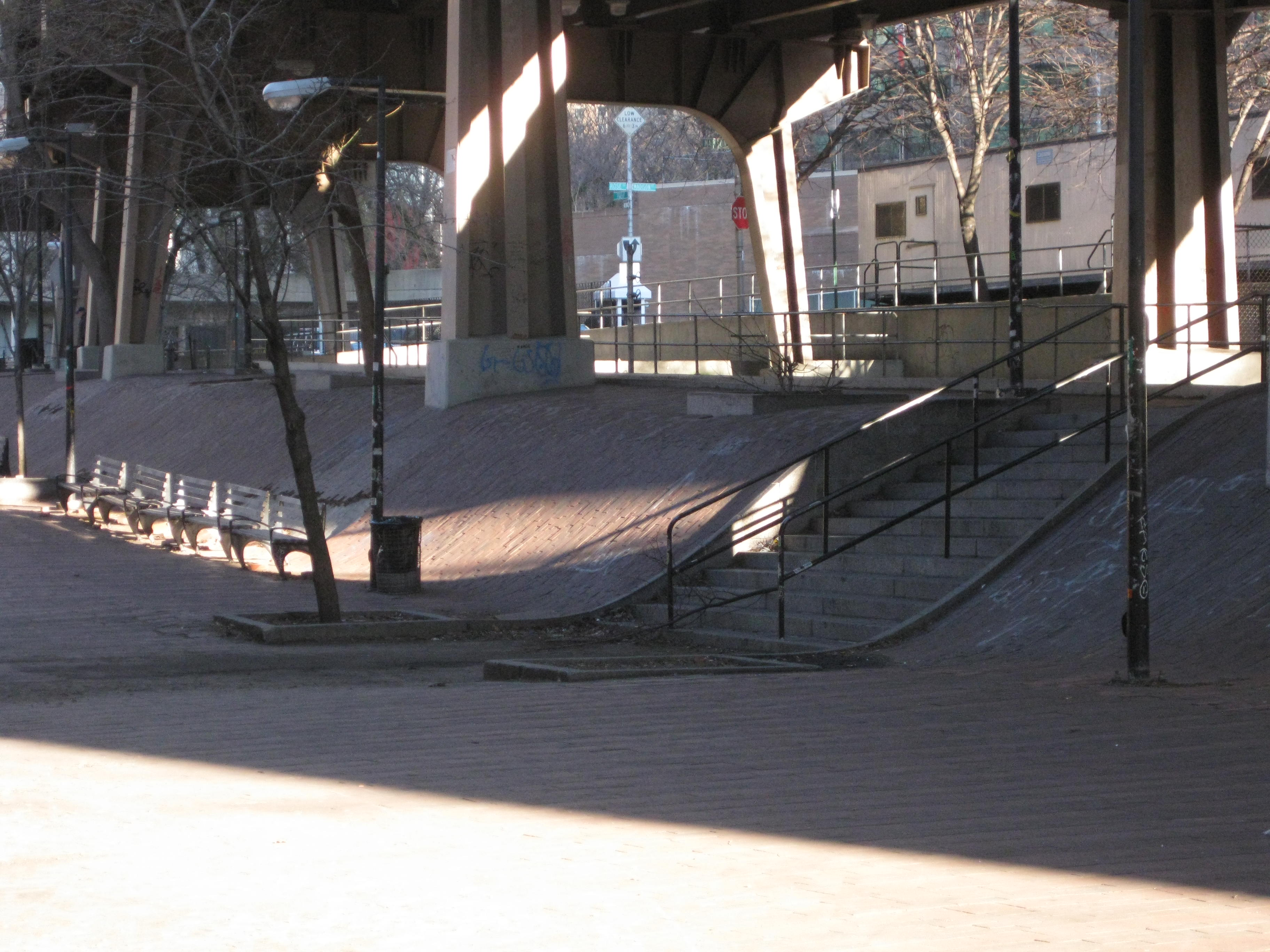
The lower banks in 2010

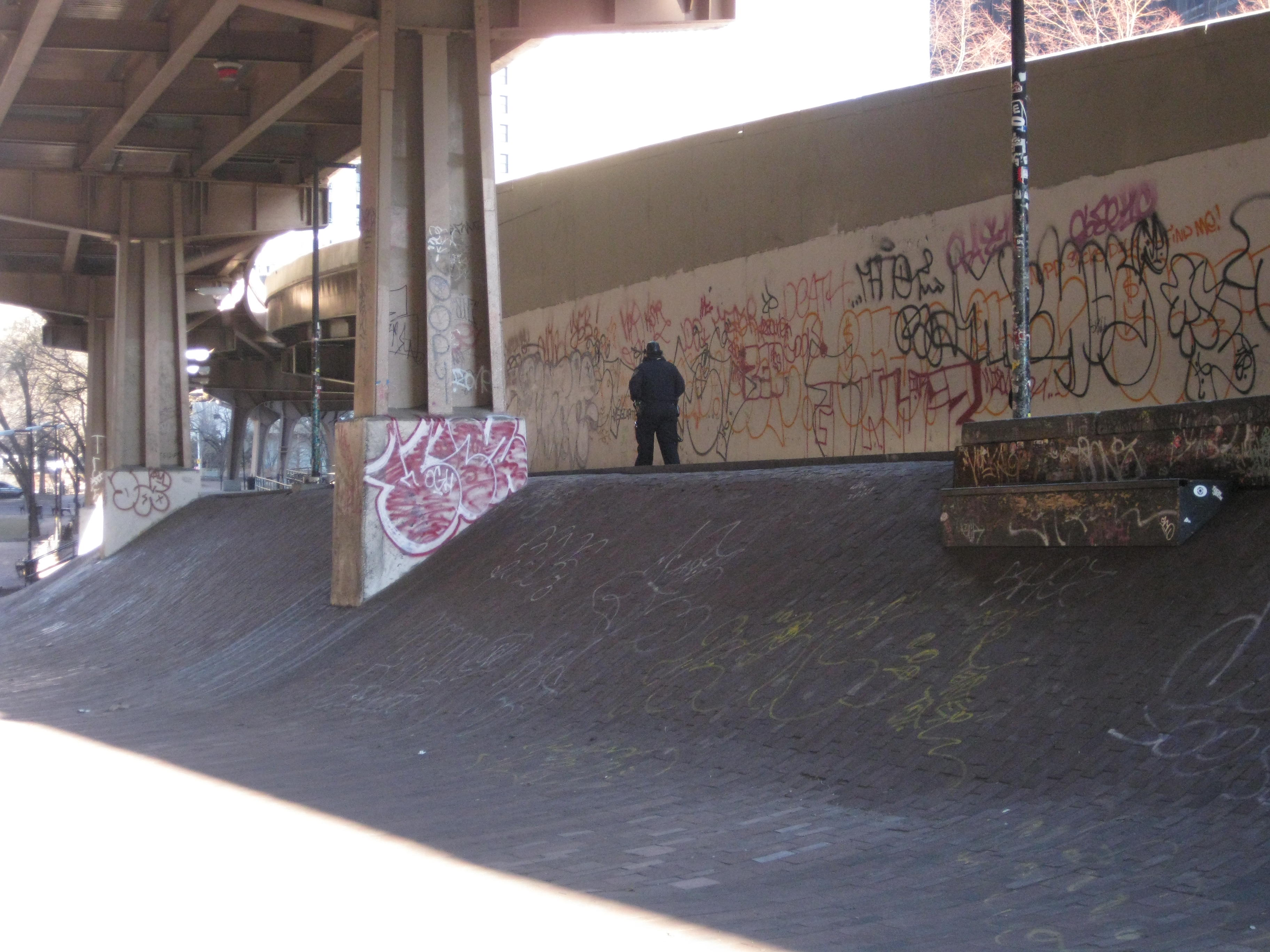
The lower banks in 2010

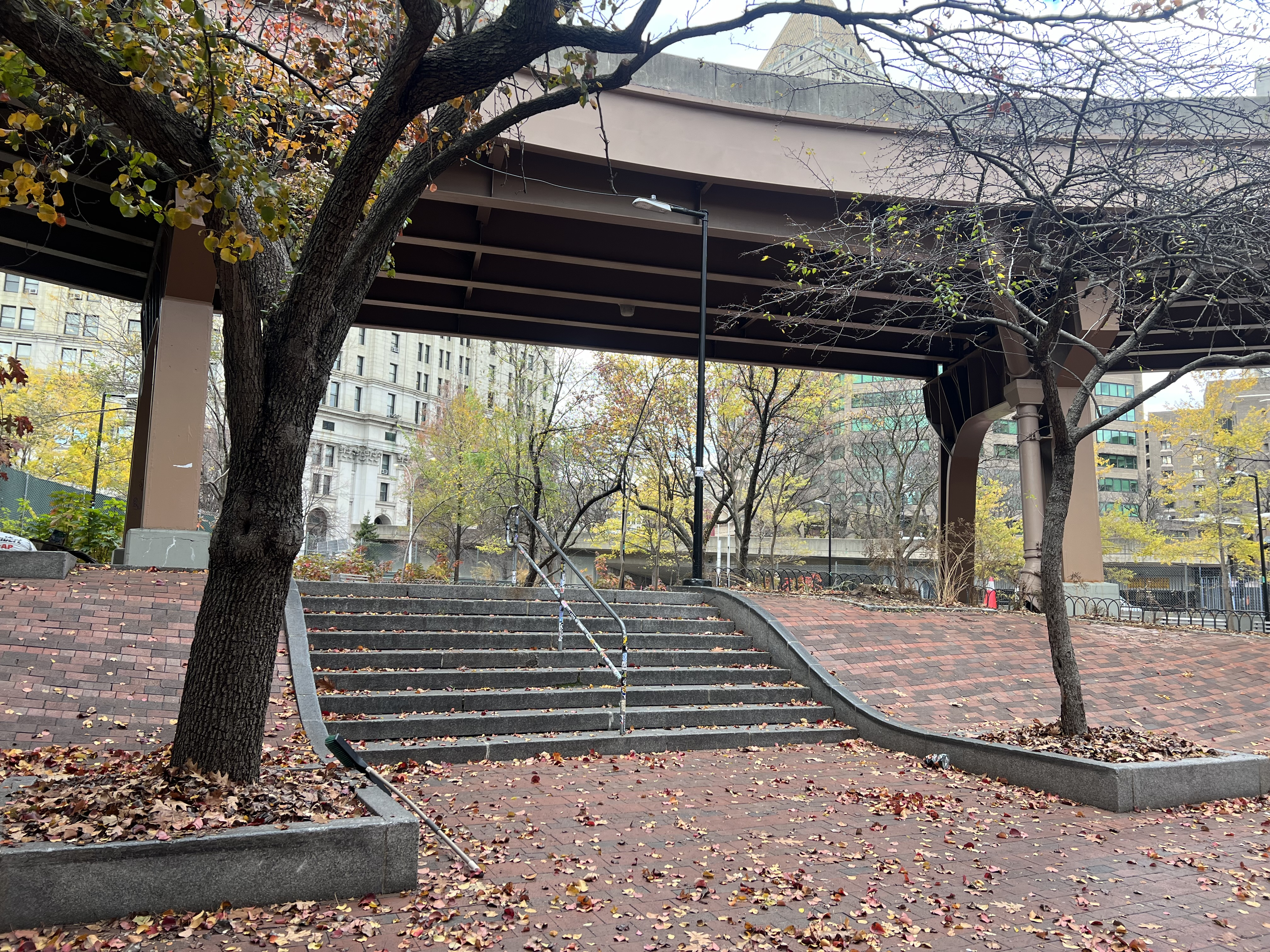
Part of the reopened upper banks in 2023

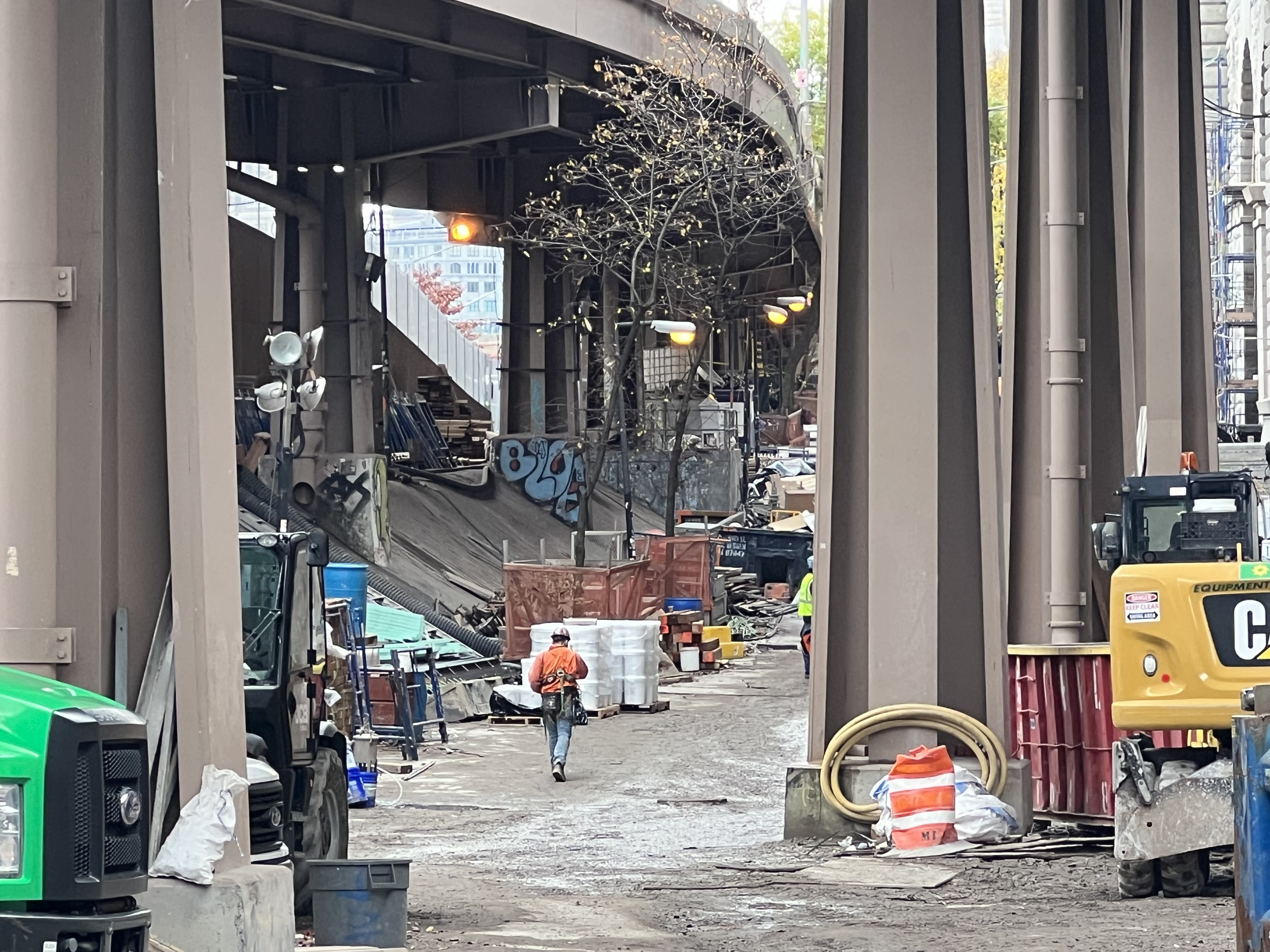
The lower banks undergoing renovation in 2023

== Video game appearances ==
Due to their fame, virtual versions of the Brooklyn Banks have appeared in several skateboarding video games including Tony Hawk's Pro Skater 2, Thrasher: Skate and Destroy, Tony Hawk's Underground, and Session: Skate Sim.
