= Skateboarding is not a crime =

Slogan advocating for skateboarding

Skateboarding is not a crime is a slogan advocating for the right of anyone to enjoy skateboarding.

In 1987, skateboard company Powell Peralta initiated an advertising campaign using "skateboarding is not a crime" as their slogan. Their 1988 advertising video, Public Domain, showed skateboarders in various locations which displayed stickers showing the slogan.

In 1997, skateboard company NHS, Inc. began formal use of the slogan for their brand.

Various commentators in the skateboarding community have discussed what the phrase means to them.

Skateboarding at the 2020 Summer Olympics raised the profile of the sport, leading commentators to reflect on how skateboarding was previously referred to as a crime.

The phrase has been used to advertise skateparks in locations where skateboarding is encouraged. It has also been used for the opposite to explain where skateboarding is discouraged.

== Further consideration ==
- Public Domain by Powell Peralta, some early use of the slogan
- Skateboarding is not a crime by Skate Inc
- SKATEBOARDING IS NOT A CRIME | A Dramatic Reenactment by The Berrics
