= Wallenberg Set =

Popular skateboarding location in San Francisco, California, U.S.

The Wallenberg Set, also known as the Wallenberg Four or simply Wallenberg, is a popular location in the skateboarding community. Located at the Raoul Wallenberg Traditional High School in San Francisco, California, it consists of four tiers of pavement and curbing, adjacent to a stairway and next to a parking area. The section notable for skateboarding measures 4 feet 4.8 inches (1.341 m) in height and 16 feet 6 inches (5.03 m) in length.

Since becoming notable, the school has re-profiled the "run up" to the set, and it is no longer possible to use adjacent Vega Street to gain speed in order to jump the entire set; speed has to be obtained from a ramp, roll in, or by some other form.

The address of the school is 40 Vega Street, San Francisco, California 94118. The GPS coordinates of the Wallenberg Set are 37.78014°N 122.44664°W.

== Coverage in skateboarding media ==
The Wallenberg gap first appeared in Mark Gonzales's part in "Video Days," a 1991 skateboarding video released by Blind Skateboards.

In 1999, Danny Gonzalez performed a kickflip to melon grab as seen in Transworld's "The Reason".

In 2004, Thrasher skateboard magazine hosted "High Noon at the Big Four" at the famous spot. Unlike traditional skateboarding competitions, there were no rankings or standings; the event was billed as a "big tricks contest." In order to encourage skaters to attempt difficult tricks, cash prizes were offered for landing specific ones. Andrew Reynolds was the first skateboarder to successfully perform a frontside flip. Darrell Stanton performed a switch backside 180. Lindsey Robertson landed a heelflip over the set.

On 30 May 2009, Thrasher magazine's Back to the Berg contest was held at Wallenberg, in which another set of difficult tricks were landed. Jordan Hoffart's varial heelflip, Nick Merlino's switch heelflip, Chris Cole's backside 360 and switch frontside flip, Cody McEntire's backside bigspin, Andrew Pott's hardflip, and Lizard King's 180 ollie north, ollie disaster, and scarewalk.

Andrew Reynolds backside kickflipped the set. The trick appeared on the cover of the May 2007 issue of Thrasher and was also added to Reynold's part in Emerica's Stay Gold released in 2010.

Chris Cole was the first one to 360 flip it in New Blood a skateboarding video by Zero Skateboards. Some other tricks include a backside 180 (Diego Bucchieri), a pop-shove it (by Steve Nesser - 411VM #66), a switch ollie, a switch frontside 180 (by Tony Manfre - montage in Free Your Mind from Transworld Skateboarding), and a pop-shove it to melon grab (Jeremy Reeves, from footage featured on Thrasher magazine's website).

Forrest Edwards landed a switch kickflip down the stairs; there are photographs of the feat in the April 2013 issue of Thrasher, and a 'magnified' clip of the trick on Thrasher's YouTube channel. On the same day, DJ Gaudin landed a switch backside kickflip.

Chris Joslin performed two tricks down the set for his Etnies Album part. The first was a hardflip backside 180 which was only captured from one angle since he landed it on his third attempt. The second was an inward heelflip. Both tricks had never been done (NBD) at this location.

On November 9, 2019, Miles Silvas switch back heelflipped the set after five trips to the spot spanning over four years of attempts.
