= Recreation advocate =

A recreation advocate is a community organizer who focuses their efforts on improving public recreation spaces such as parks and playgrounds.

== History ==
The role of recreation advocate is a philanthropic one that grew alongside the playground movement of the mid 19th century. Joseph Lee (1862-1937) is recognized as one of the early pioneers of recreation advocacy.
