= Hubba Hideout =

Former public location used for skateboarding

Coordinates: 37.795632°N 122.397826°W

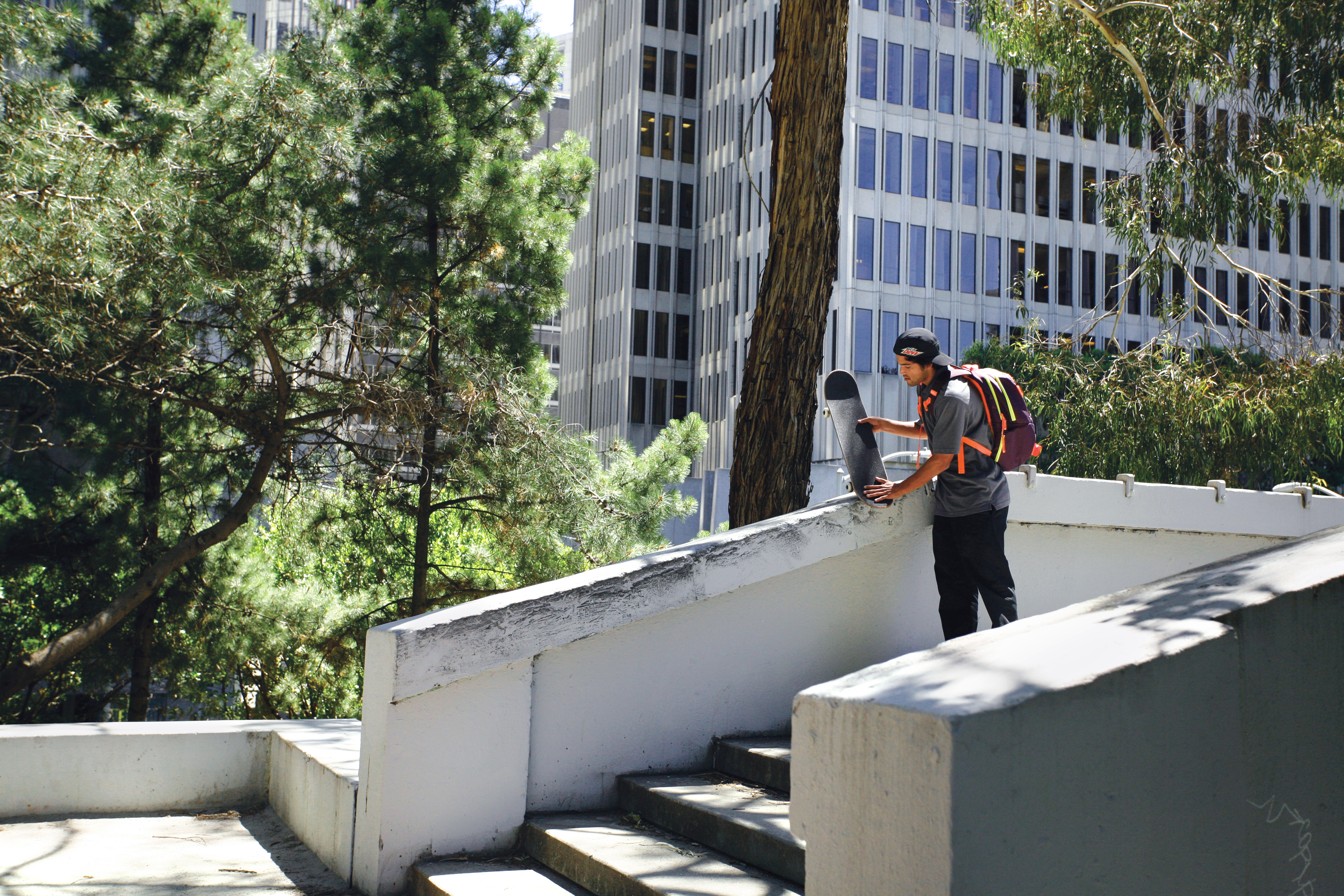
Paul Rodriguez at Hubba Hideout in 2010

Hubba Hideout was one of the most famous skateboarding spots. It was located in San Francisco near the Justin Herman Plaza on the Embarcadero. Its central features were two oversized sets of 6 stairs with large concrete ledges on both sides. The spot is part of a pedestrian walkway but was more commonly used by the local skateboarders and vagrants. The city of San Francisco made numerous attempts over the years to ward off skateboarders from the spot, and in January 2011 city workers completely demolished its ledges and stairs.

== Etymology ==
Hubba Hideout got its handle because of the nefarious denizens that would frequent the skate spot looking for a hidden place to engage in illicit activity. The nickname was a nod to the Bay Area slang term for crack cocaine: "hubbas." Appearing in numerous skateboard videos and attracting a wide following, the Hubba Hideout eventually gained such popularity among skaters that the term "hubba" became synonymous with any type of concrete ledge that leads down a stairway for example: Black Hubba in NYC or Clipper Hubba.

== History ==
The first documented trick on the ledge at Hubba Hideout was Wade Speyer's crooked grind which was photographed on black and white film by skate photographer Bryce Kanights. Hubba Hideout gained fame through skateboarding magazines and videos and it became a mecca for advanced skateboarders visiting San Francisco.

The frequency of skateboarders eventually attracted the attention of the authorities and resulted in a full-scale skate-stopper implementation (in the late part of the nineties). The ledges were capped (or knobbed) with skate-stopping devices which rendered them impossible to grind.

Skateboarders eventually managed to remove the skate-stopping devices and use of the ledges resumed.

In March 2007, local authorities had the brick landing taken out and covered it in sand. However, this did not render the spot un-skateable. A rather simple impromptu set-up of wood or other material replacing the brick landing would suffice to cushion the initial impact and allow for a clean landing across the sand.

In January 2011, the spot was fully demolished.
