= List of skateboarding magazines =

A skate magazine or skateboarding magazine is a publication whose main topic is skateboarding. They can be in print form, online, or both.

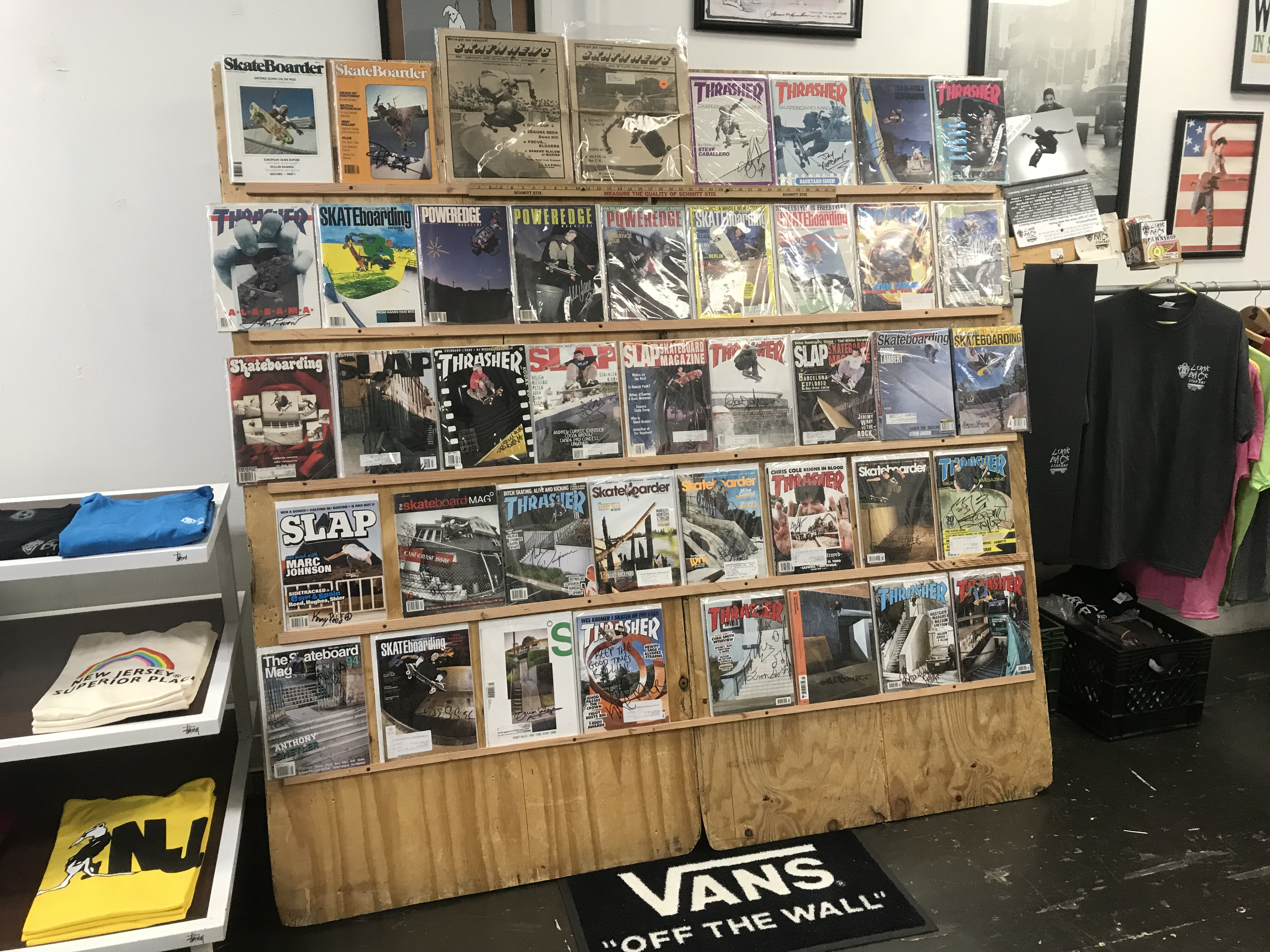
Classic skateboard magazines covers on display at a Look Back Library exhibit at NJ Skate Shop - New Brunswick, NJ

Skateboarding magazine	Years active	Location
43 (magazine)		United States
411 Video Magazine	1993–2005	United States
Action Now	1980–1982	United States
ABD Magazine		Vienna
BE Skateboarding	2016–present	Europe
Big Brother (magazine)	1992–2004	United States
Brasil Skate (BR)		Brazil
COLOR (magazine)	2003–2013	Canada
Concussion Magazine		United States
Dose Skateboarding	2020–present	Germany
Confusion magazine	2010–present	International
Concrete Wave Magazine	2002–present	Canada
Déjà-vu Skatemag		France
document (magazine)	1997–2009	United Kingdom
DOGPISS MAGAZINE		United Kingdom
Esqueite		Brazil
Five 40 Skateboarding	1988–1990	Australia
FLAT Mégazine	1993–1996	Switzerland
Free (skateboarding magazine)	2015–present	United Kingdom
Focus Skate Mag	2005–2015	Philadelphia
Format Skateboard Magazine		
giftorm	Est. 2004	Sweden
grey skate mag		United Kingdom
Jenkem Magazine	2011–present	United States
Juice (skateboarding magazine)	1993–present	Venice Beach, CA
HOMEBOY	1987	USA
Huck (magazine)	2006–present	London, UK
Kingpin Magazine		United Kingdom
Lodown magazine	1995–2016	Germany
Lowcard Mag		United States
Love Skate Mag	2018–present	Montreal
Le Nouveau Skate International	~1978	France
Medium Skate Mag		Toronto
Monster Skateboard Magazine	~1985	
National Skateboard Review	1976–1979	
New Zealand Skateboarder		New Zealand
North Skateboard Magazine	2011–present	Scotland
OH-SO	Est. 2018	
One Love Skatemag		Denmark
Pocket Skateboard Mag		Germany
Pop Magazine	2005–2016	Australia
Poweredge Magazine	Jan 1988 – Oct 1991	United States
Push Periodical	2015–present	San Francisco / Belgium
R.A.D.	1987–1995	United Kingdom
same old		United Kingdom
Sessions		
Session Magazine	c. 2010 –	South Africa
Sidewalk (magazine)	1995–2016	United Kingdom
Skate International Belgie	~1978	Belgium
Skateboarder (magazine)	1964 – print ended in 2013	United States
Skateboard	1975 one issue	United States
Skateboard		Germany
Skateboard Magazin	~1978	Germany
Skaterock	2005–present	Czech Republic
Skateboard!	1977–1979 1988–1992 relaunched	United Kingdom
Skateboard Scene	1977–?	United Kingdom
Skateboard Special	1977–1978	United Kingdom
Skateboard World	1977–1979	United States
Skateboard World.Japan	1977–1978	Japan
Skate		
Skate Jawn	2010–present	Philadelphia / Brooklyn
Skateworld Journal		
Skat'n News		
Skate Rider		
Skate Magazine		France
Skate France International		France
Skateboard		France
Slam Skateboarding	1988–present	Australia
Slap Magazine	1992–2008	United States
Slicks	1976	Australia
SOLO skateboard magazine		Cologne, Germany
Super Skateboard		France
Staf magazine		Spain
Stoops		Los Angeles
Street Noise	1990–1993	Australia
Streetsurfing		
STRENGTH (magazine)	1995 – Oct 2002	
The Quarterly Skateboarder	only 2 issues before it became Skateboarder Magazine	
The Skateboarder's Companion		United Kingdom
That Noise Magazine	Est. 2012	Switzerland
Transworld Skateboarding	1983 – print edition ended in 2019 after 397 issues	United States
The Skateboard Mag	Est. March 2004 – 2017	Carlsbad, California
Thrasher (magazine)	Est. January 1981–present	San Francisco
Wild World of Skateboarding	1976–1978	United States
