= Dave Hackett =

Canadian professional skateboarder

Dave “Hackman” Hackett
Personal information
- Full name: David Jude Hackett
- Nickname: "Hackman!" the Gnar
- Born: November 12, 1960 (age 65) Wilmington, Delaware
- Height: 6 ft 0 in (1.83 m)
- Weight: 190 lb (86 kg)
- Website: hackettslash.com

Sport
- Country: United States of America
- Sport: Skateboarding, Surfing
- Events: Pools, Bowls, Slalom, Banked Slalom, Downhill
- Turned pro: Summer, 1975

Dave “Hackman” Hackett (born David Jude Hackett on November 12, 1960) is a professional skateboarder from Malibu, California.

== Career ==
Hackett has been featured in many skateboard films, videos and movies including the award-winning documentary DogTown and Z-Boyz.

In 1975, Hackett won the Hang Ten World Championship Jr. Men’s’ Slalom Title at age 15, and the 1978 US Open Men’s Bowl and Pool Riding Title at Kona Skatepark at age 18.

Known as "Hackman", he was a pioneer of Extreme Skateboard stunts, and one of the first skateboarders to transfer surf moves from the water to the land. Hackett was also the first to jump 3 cars end to end on a Rocket Powered Skateboard and the first Pro to jump a 25 stair set in 1982.

In 1979, Hackett starred in the Action Sports TV show HotShots with overall world champion Tony Alva. In this show he debuted the “Pipe to Pipe” Ollie. Later on his career, DogTown photographer, Glen E. Friedman captured the “Hackett Slash” on film, soon becoming a recognized image in Skateboarding. The image has been made into T-shirts, Posters, Tattoos, a Skateshop Logo, Signs, Paintings and Sculptures.

In 1984, Hackman helped start Jimmy’Z clothing line and sponsored other renowned riders such as Christian Hosoi, Scott Oster, Eric Dressen, and Steve Olson. A year later, in 1985 Hackett’s first of two signature skateboards, The Iron Cross and & The Street Sickle, was released on the Skull Skates brand along with team members Duane Peters, Steve Olson and Christian Hosoi. In 2003 Hackett was chosen by Juice magazine as one of the 50 Most Influential Skateboarders in the World. In 2005 Hackett formed the Skateboard Racers Association (SRA) designing and sanctioning professional skateboard races around the globe.

Still in 2005, Hackett beat the World Champion Italian Luca Giammarco to take the European TS Skateboard Racing title at the European Championships in Stockholm, Sweden.

In 2006, at the age of 46, Hackett set the world record for being the “Oldest Pro” to complete Tony Hawk’s “Loop of Death".

In 2008, former skateboarder magazine editor Sean Mortimer included Dave Hackett in his skateboarding book StaleFish, highlighting the experiences of 16 of the world’s most influential skateboarders. He can be seen in magazines such as The Skateboard Mag, Concrete Wave and Thrasher.

In his 50s, Hackett is still an active skateboarder, winning the World tight slalom Championship title in 2015 and the Overall US Nationals Masters Title in 2016. Hackman surfs and skateboards regularly, as well as plays guitar. His sponsors include Khiro Skateboard Products, Osiris Shoes, Independent Trucks, Nitro Bearings, Kryptonics Wheels, Black Leather Racing and Deathbox Skateboards.

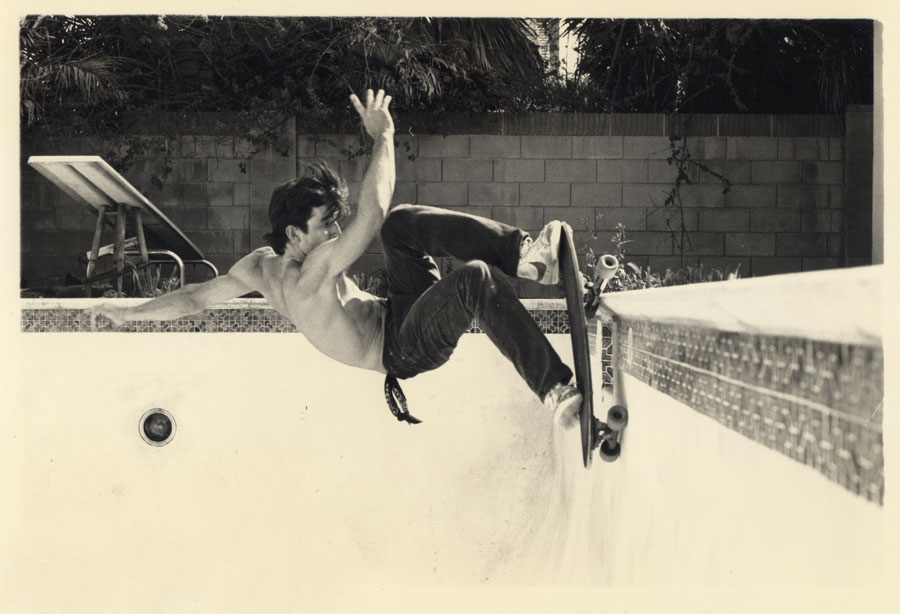
Dave's patented move titled "The Hackett Slash"

== Competition results ==
Some of Hacketts competition results include:

- 1st Place 1974 Malibu Park Jr. High School Contest
- 1st Place1975 Jr. Men's Slalom, Hang Ten World Championships
- 1st Place1978 Oasis Pro - Pool
- 1st Place1978 Oasis Pro - Half Pipe
- 1st Place1978 Oasis Pro - Cross Country
- 1st Place1978 U.S. Open Men’s Vert, Kona Skate par
- 1st Place 2002 Sandia Banked Slalom - The Bear, Alb. New Mexico
- 1st Place 2003 Indian School Outlaw Ditch Race - Alb. New Mexico
- 1st Place 2005 TS European Slalom Champion - Stockholm, Sweden
- 1st Place 2011 Masters Tight Slalom, Oceanside Open
- 1st Place 2011 Masters Giant Slalom, Oceanside Open
- 1st Place 2011 Masters Overall, Oceanside Open
- 1st Place 2012 Masters Tight Slalom, Oceanside Open
- 1st Place 2012 Masters Giant Slalom, Oceanside Open
- 1st Place 2012 Masters Overall, Oceanside Open
- 1st Place 2015 Masters Tight Slalom, World Championships, KY
- 1st Place 2016 US Nationals, Masters Tight Slalom, Oceanside
- 1st Place 2016 US Nationals, Masters Hybrid Slalom, Oceanside
- 1st Place 2016 US Nationals, Masters Giant Slalom, Oceansid
- 1st Place 2016 US Nationals, Masters Overall Title, Oceanside

== Other projects ==
Currently, Dave Hackett is also an artist and a consultant to the Action Sports Industry and the CEO of the Y.O.U. Institute, home of The Ultimate Life Tool®, an advanced human assessment instrument approved for Continuing Education by the Board of Registered Nursing and the International Coach Federation. In addition to this work, Hackett is a professional Prayer Practitioner, Spiritual Guide and Executive Life & Relationship Coach. Hackett was the MC for the International Skateboarding Hall of Fame from 2012 – 2016. He is also a Motivational Speaker and Seminar Leader.

Currently, he is the Creative Director of Castle Coatings and Brand Manager for Black Leather Racing (BLR), Malibu Surf Skates and Deathbox® Skateboards.

== See also ==
- Skateboarding trick
- Skateboarding companies
- Skateboarding sponsorship
