= List of skateboarding companies =

The following is a list of notable companies that produce skateboards and skateboarding merchandise.

Companies listed may also be members of the US-based trade association, the International Association of Skateboard Companies and may have skateboarding sponsorship arrangements with individuals, venues or events.

== A ==
- Alien Workshop
- Almost Skateboards
- AntiHero skateboards

== B ==
- Baker Skateboards
- Billabong
- Birdhouse Skateboards
- Black Box Distribution
- Blind Skateboards
- Blueprint Skateboards
- Bones Bearings
- Bronson Speed Co.

== C ==
- California Free Former
- California Skateparks
- Chocolate Skateboards
- Circa
- Cliché Skateboards
- Converse
- Creature Skateboards

== D ==
- DC Shoes
- Deathwish Skateboards
- Deluxe Distribution
- DGK Skateboards
- Dunkelvolk
- DVS Shoes
- Dwindle Distribution

== E ==
- Element Skateboards
- Enjoi
- Etnies
- Emerica

== F ==
- Fallen Footwear
- Famous Stars and Straps
- Flip Skateboards
- Fucking Awesome

== G ==
- Girl Distribution Company
- Girl Skateboards
- Globe International

== H ==
- H-Street
- Hamboards
- Hook-Ups Skateboards
- Hubba Wheels
- Hurley International
- HUF Worldwide

== I ==
- Illegal Civilization
- Independent Truck Company
- IPath Footwear

== K ==
- KR3W
- Krooked Skateboards
- Kryptonics
- Krux Trucks

== L ==
- Lifted Research Group

== M ==
- Mambo Graphics
- MOB Grip

== N ==
- New Era
- NHS, Inc.
- Nixon Watches

== O ==
- Obey
- Osiris Shoes

== P ==
- Palace Skateboards
- Penny Skateboards
- Plan B Skateboards
- Powell Peralta
- Primitive

== Q ==
- Quiksilver

== R ==
- Rayne Longboards
- Rip Curl
- Royal Trucks
- RVCA
- Rubicon Skateboards

== S ==
- Santa Cruz Skateboards
- Say-10
- Sector 9
- Sessions
- Shake Junt
- Skate Jawn
- Spitfire Wheels
- Stance
- Stüssy
- Supreme

== T ==
- Tensor Trucks
- The Hundreds
- Thrasher
- Toy Machine
- Tum Yeto
- Two Seasons

== V ==
- Vans
- Vision Street Wear
- Volcom

== W ==
- World Industries

== Z ==
- Zero Skateboards
- Zoo York
