= Mid-Atlantic Skateboard Series =

Amateur mid-Atlantic skateboarding competition series

The Mid-Atlantic Skateboard Series is a skateboarding competition series started by former pro skateboarder Curt Kimbel. The series has been running every summer since 2003 and usually runs from July until late August. The series is meant to attract amateur skateboarders from all over the mid-Atlantic. Its format is quite simple. The contest tours skateparks in Maryland and Virginia nearly every weekend for about 6 weeks. Prizes are awarded to anyone who places 4th or higher in a variety of divisions. The points for each place are 5th Place-500, 4th place-750, 3rd place-800, 2nd place-900, and 1st place-1000. At the series finale (always in St. Mary's County), the points are tallied up for each skater and their overall points are matched against others to determine an overall placing for each division. Prizes for overall winners have varied by year. Most of the years the contest has been held, the divisions were divided into ages and also included divisions for longboarders, women, and up to 3 street divisions. Since its beginning, portions of the contest have been filmed and aired on Concretewave TV – a program on FUEL TV. With the exception of the first year, fees are $20 per contest. The event benefits the Surfrider Foundation. As of 2006 it is the largest contest series on the east coast.

== 2003 ==
In 2003 the contests main sponsor was Deathbox Skateboards. Due to it being the series first year and the slow progress on the St. Mary's skatepark the contest was by far the smallest and most disorganized compared to following years. Despite this the series was a success. The dates for the contest were:

- Charles County Skatepark, Saturday, June 8
- Vans Skatepark, Saturday, June 15
- St.Mary's County Skatepark, Saturday, August 31

The Divisions were:

- 10 and under
- 11-13
- 14-16
- 17-19
- 20-29
- 30-39
- 40 and older
- Women
- Longboard

Among others sponsors included: Osiris Shoes, Plug Skateboards, Alian Snowboards, and Exodus Clothing.

== 2004 ==
In 2004 the format was changed from a one-day event to a two-day event that included points for street skaters as well. Because of the additional categories, it was changed to a two-day event at each skatepark. Checkers restaurant was the main sponsor of the years' contests. Because of the new sponsor, the series saw huge growth and was able to spend much more money. There were even two full-page advertisements in Concrete Wave Magazine. Despite the additional support and exposure, the two-day format would prove to be too much for organizers and competitors. This format would not repeat. The dates for the contest were:

- Charles County Skatepark, July 10–11
- Vans Skatepark, July 17–18
- St. Mary's County Skatepark, August 21–22

The Divisions were:

- 10 and under
- 11-12
- 13-14
- 15-16
- 17-19
- 20-29
- 30-39
- 40 and older
- Women
- Longboard

The sponsors were Alian Snowboards, Checkers, Banzai Skateboards, Pleasure Tool, Central Boardshop, Deathbox Skateboards, Edger Griptape, Gravity Skateboards, Exodus Clothes, Nagchaumpa, Osiris Shoes, Plug Skateboards, Pocketpistols, RoeRacing, Sk8kings.com, Tracker Trucks, Arc Boardshop, Bozi Boards, IPS, Old School Skateshop, Owens Ski and Sport, and Concrete Wave.

== 2005 ==
In 2005 the series took a large turn by changing the format and rules in many ways and adding new parks while dropping old ones. Instead of combining the street and bowl skating they decided to separate them. Most liked this format much better and liked even more that it was changed back to a one-day event. In 2005, Ledo Pizza became the series main sponsor. Ledo Pizza would provide free food and drink for each contest. The dates for the contests were:

- Frederick Skatepark MD, Saturday, July 30
- Charles County Skatepark MD, Saturday, August 6
- Arlington Skatepark VA, Saturday, August 20
- St. Mary's County Skatepark, Saturday, August 27

The Divisions were:

- 10 and under
- 11-13
- 14-16
- 17-19
- 20-29
- 30-39
- 40 and older
- Women
- Longboard
- Street Novice
- Street Intermediate
- Street Expert

Sponsors Included: Alian Snowboards, Banzai Skateboards, Pleasure Tool, Central Boardshop, Deathbox Skateboards, Edger Griptape, Gravity Skateboards, Exodus Clothes, Nagchaumpa, Osiris Shoes, Plug Skateboards, Pocketpistols, RoeRacing, Sk8kings.com, Tracker Trucks, Arc Boardshop, Bozi Boards, IPS, Old School Skateshop, Owens Ski and Sport, Concrete Wave, and Windells Skate Camp.

== 2006 ==
In 2006 the format remained the same as the previous year. Despite many rumors, the series went on and was once again sponsored by Ledo Pizza. The most surprising addition to the contest was its Kronik Energy sponsored "Pro Class". It gave competitors a chance to compete in a class separate from their age division with cash prizes. Top places – 1st, 2nd, and 3rd overall – in this division won money at the series finale in St. Mary's County. Third place won $200, 2nd won $300, and 1st won $500. The series dates were:

- Arlington Va, Saturday, July 29
- Frederick MD, Saturday, August 5
- Charles County MD, Saturday, August 19
- St. Mary's County MD, Saturday, August 26

Divisions were:

- 10 and under
- 11-13
- 14-16
- 17-19
- 20-29
- 30-39
- 40 and older
- Women
- Longboard
- Street Novice
- Street Intermediate
- Street Expert
- Kronik Energy Pro Class (winner was Ben Hatchell)

Sponsors were: Banzai Skateboards, Pleasure Tool, Central Boardshop, Deathbox Skateboards, Edger Griptape, Gravity Skateboards, Exodus Clothes, Nagchaumpa, Osiris Shoes, Plug Skateboards, Pocketpistols, RoeRacing, Sk8kings.com, Tracker Trucks, Arc Boardshop, Bozi Boards, IPS, Old School Skateshop, Owens Ski and Sport, Concrete Wave, and Windells Skate Camp, Dakine, Pitcrew, Rebel Skates, Bones, FKD, Powell
