= Waverider (disambiguation) =

A waverider is a type of hypersonic aircraft that takes advantage of compression lift from its own shock wave.

Waverider or wave rider, may also refer to:

== Transportation and vehicles ==
- Boeing X-51 Waverider, a hypersonic research aircraft
- Wave Rider class patrolboat, from the Naval Boat Building Yard (Sri Lanka)
- Wave Rider a series of ocean-going robots by Liquid Robotics

== Sports ==
- Delhi Waveriders, Delhi, India; a field hockey team
- WaveRiders, Kealakehe High School, Kailau, Hawaii, USA; the school sports team

=== Surfing ===
- surfer, the person or board (surfboard), used in surfing
- Wave Rider, a surfing magazine
- Waveriders (film), a 2008 surfing documentary film
- Wave Riders Association of Afghanistan, the surfing sports federation

== Arts and entertainment ==
- Waverider (character), a DC Comics superhero
- Waverider, a ship featured in the Arrowverse series Legends of Tomorrow
- Waverider (character), a Transformers character from The Transformers: Spotlight
- Waverider, a flume ride at HerseyPark, Hersey, Pennsylvania, USA; see History of Hersheypark

== Other uses ==
- WaveRider Communications

== See also ==
- Waverunner (disambiguation)
- Rider (disambiguation)
- Wave (disambiguation)
