= Color magazine =

Color magazine or colour magazine may refer to:

== Generic terms ==
- A colour supplement, a full-colour magazine packaged with a newspaper
- Color magazine (lighting), a filter mechanism which is part of a lighting system

== Individual magazines ==
- Color (skateboard lifestyle magazine), a skateboard lifestyle culture quarterly published in Vancouver

== See also ==
- Colors (magazine)
