= Bruce Lyon =

American film producer

Bruce Lyon (born c.1948) is an American film producer, animator, and artist.

== Career ==
In 1980 he won an Academy Award in the Scientific Technical Achievement Category for inventing the Lyon Lamb Video Animation System (shared with John Lamb) a single frame video device for pre-testing animation art (pencil tests) before it's committed to final production. Video recordings were 30 frames per second, while film had a standard of 24 frames per second. Their animation system allowed animators to record pencil tests with 24 frames per second, just like film, one or two frames at a time. He and John also designed and built a video-rotoscope machine that was used to make the music video "Tom Waits for No One", which they won first place for at the 1st Hollywood Film and Video Festival.
