= International Association of Skateboard Companies =

- Formation: 1995
- Type: Trade association
- Headquarters: 22431 Antonio Parkway, Suite B160-412
- Location: Rancho Santa Margarita, California 92688
- Executive Director: Thomas Barker
- Website: theiasc.org

The International Association of Skateboard Companies (IASC) is a for-profit trade association that seeks to promote skateboarding as a leisure activity. Its board of directors includes representatives of a number of skateboarding companies who in turn represent a membership base of "skateboard manufacturers, distributors, contest organizers, ramp designers and individuals".

== History ==
The IASC was established in 1995 by Jim Fitzpatrick, with the goal of promoting skateboarding, increase participation, saving its members money and educating the community about skateboarding. Its members include skateboard manufacturers, distributors, skatepark designers and contest organisers.

Its current board of directors includes representatives of Dwindle Distribution, Sole Technology, Wabsono International, Transworld Skateboarding, DVS Shoes, Sector 9, Black Box, Nike Skateboarding, Element, Tum Yeto (Tod Swank), The Skateboard Mag, DC Shoes, Vans and Blitz Distribution (Per Welinder).

== Initiatives ==
=== Go Skateboarding Day ===
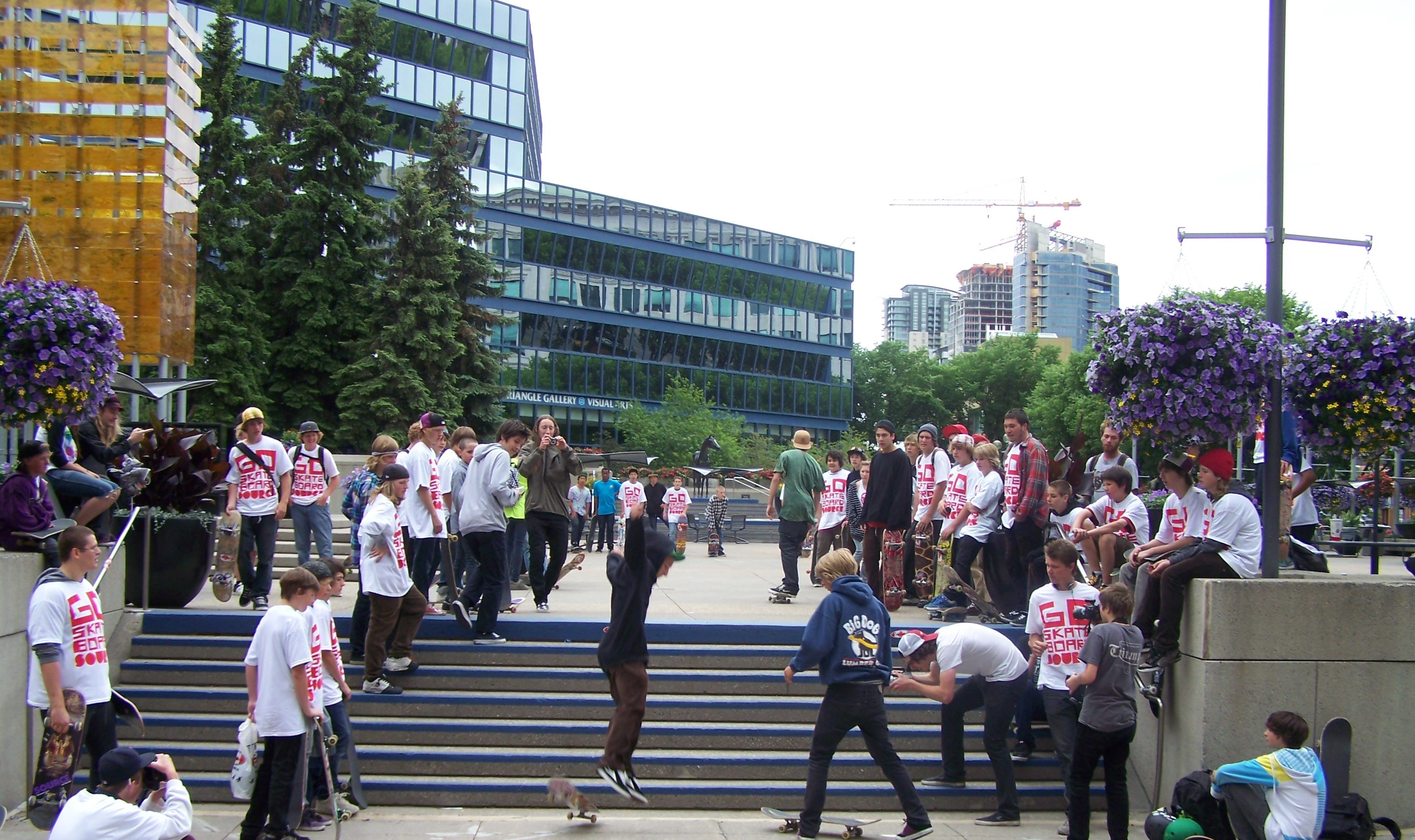
Skaters at a Go Skateboarding Day event in Calgary, Canada.

The IASC established an annual Go Skateboarding Day (usually June 21 each year) to encourage skateboarders around the world to go skateboarding, hold competitions and generally promote skateboarding and to encourage non-skaters to consider buying a skateboard.

=== Anti-blank-deck campaign ===
In part, the initial establishment of the association was prompted by industry concerns about the sale of blank (un-branded) skateboard decks. In 1994, during the months before the establishment of the association, representatives of various skateboarding companies met to discuss their concerns. In particular, companies were concerned about the proliferation of un-branded decks for sale in skate shops and other retail outlets that had not been produced by one of the major skate brands. These decks carried no logos or associated designs and were produced by manufacturers that (according to the companies) did not contribute to the sponsorship of skateboarders, venues or events. The association was officially established the following year.

In 2007, the IASC released a report, produced in conjunction with Transworld Skateboarding titled, Under Fire: A special report on the skate hard-goods market. In it, the IASC detailed the impact of blank deck sales on the wider industry and encouraged skaters to only buy and ride branded decks and to wear branded clothing at competitions. The IASC also resolved to encourage media outlets to only publish stories with images that included skaters supporting their sponsors' brands.

Blitz Distribution, an IASC member company, established www.aworldwithoutpros.com to support the campaign. A number of skaters and industry representatives established www.aworldwithoutceos.com as a direct counter-argument to the claims made by the IASC. Both sites have since been taken down.

As a result of the campaign, a number of manufacturers discontinued direct sale of blank decks (though a number continued to supply IASC member companies).

=== Liability laws ===
During the late-1990s, founding director Jim Fitzpatrick and the IASC campaigned for reform of California's public liability laws as they pertained to skateboarding in particular. The campaign was successful and laws were changed in 1997 to introduce liability limits.

=== Just One Board ===
In 2012, the IASC and the Go Skateboarding Foundation (established by the IASC to run Go Skateboarding Day) launched the non-profit Just One Board initiative. Just One Board seeks to collect used skateboards and refurbish them for distribution to underprivileged children.

== See also ==
- ISSA - International Slalom Skateboarding Association
