= Jawn =

Philadelphia slang term

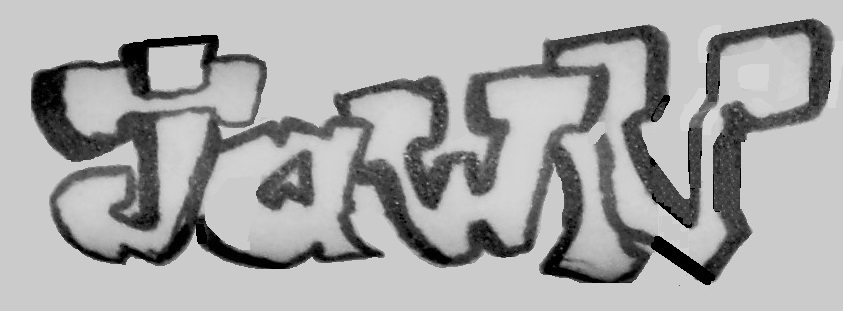
The word Jawn in graffiti style text

Jawn is a slang term local to Philadelphia and, by extension, the Philadelphia metropolitan area. It is a placeholder word that may refer to a thing, place, person, or event, substituting for a specific word/name. Jawn is a context-dependent substitute noun; a noun that substitutes for other nouns. Jawn can be singular or plural. Examples include: "These jawns are expensive!", "Pass me that jawn.", "Slow it down, jawn.", "That new jawn.", "This jawn is packed."

Jawn is believed to be derived from the word "joint" (as its proper pronunciation sounds more like "joiwn"). The term began in the past as joint, a place where bones meet; from this came a term to refer to a place where criminals meet; this came to any place (see Glossary of jive talk); in New York hip-hop this came to mean any thing; and in Philadelphia this was used broadly and pronounced as jawn.

== Popular culture ==
- In a scene in the 2015 Philadelphia-based feature film Creed, the character Bianca explains to Adonis Creed the meaning of jawn.
- Skate Jawn is a skateboard magazine, founded in 2010 in Philadelphia, PA. The original name of the magazine was Skate Jawn Mag Jawn.
- Philadelphia-native Ahmir "Questlove" Thompson's documentary films Summer of Soul and Sly Lives! are each billed as "A Questlove Jawn."

== See also ==
- Philadelphia English
- Da kine
