= Keenan Milton =

American skateboarder

Personal information
- Nationality: American
- Born: August 4, 1974
- Died: July 5, 2001 (aged 26)

Sport
- Sport: Skateboarding

Keenan Milton (August 4, 1974 – July 5, 2001) was an American professional skateboarder from Atlanta, Georgia. His sponsors included DVS Shoes, Chocolate skateboards.

Keenan was the second child of nine children born to Phyllis Patterson. He had four brothers and four sisters. His mother was murdered in 1991. Keenan was raised in Harlem, New York, by his grandmother, Georgia Patterson, who died in May 2008.

In 2001, he accidentally drowned at an Independence Day party. Upon his death memorial and funeral services were held in the cities of Los Angeles, New York, and Savannah, Georgia. Even after his death, old footage of Keenan has been used in several videos. The introduction to the videos Yeah Right! and pretty sweet, by Girl Distribution Company; as well as, Bunny Hop, released by the chocolate skate company in December, 2021.

Hip hop musician Murs says "Rest in peace, Keenan Milton/Keep ridin" in his song "Transitions as a Rider" from the soundtrack to the film Rising Son: The Legend of Skateboarder Christian Hosoi.

Musician Devendra Banhart included a song called "The Ballad of Keenan Milton" on his 2013 album, Mala.

== Video appearances ==
- Chocolate Skateboards – Hot Chocolate (2003)
- Girl Skateboards – Yeah Right! (2003)
- 411VM – Around the World (2002)
- 411VM – #38 (2000)
- Chocolate Skateboards – The Chocolate Tour (1999)
- Transworld Skateboarding – Greatest Hits (1997)
- Girl Skateboards – Mouse (1996)
- FTC – Penal Code 100a (1996)
- Chocolate Skateboards – Las Nueve Vidas De Paco (1995)
- World Industries – 20 Shot Sequence (1995)
