= Jet Ski (disambiguation) =

A jet ski, or personal watercraft, is a small recreational watercraft.

Jet Ski or jetski may also refer to:

- Jet Ski (brand), brand name of a personal watercraft manufactured by Kawasaki

== People ==
- Lil Pump (born 2000), a US rapper, also known as "Jetski"
- Rhettski the Jetski (born 1987), U.S. pro-wrestler

== Music ==
- "Jetski" (song), by Internet Money, Lil Tecca and Lil Mosey
- "Jet Ski", a song by Bikini Kill from the album Reject All American

== Other uses ==
- PC DOS "Jetski" v4.02, an operating system version

== See also ==
- Kawasaki Jet Ski (video game), a video game for the Wii console
- Waverunner (disambiguation)
- Ski (disambiguation)
- Jet (disambiguation)
