= Skate photography =

Taking images of skateboarding

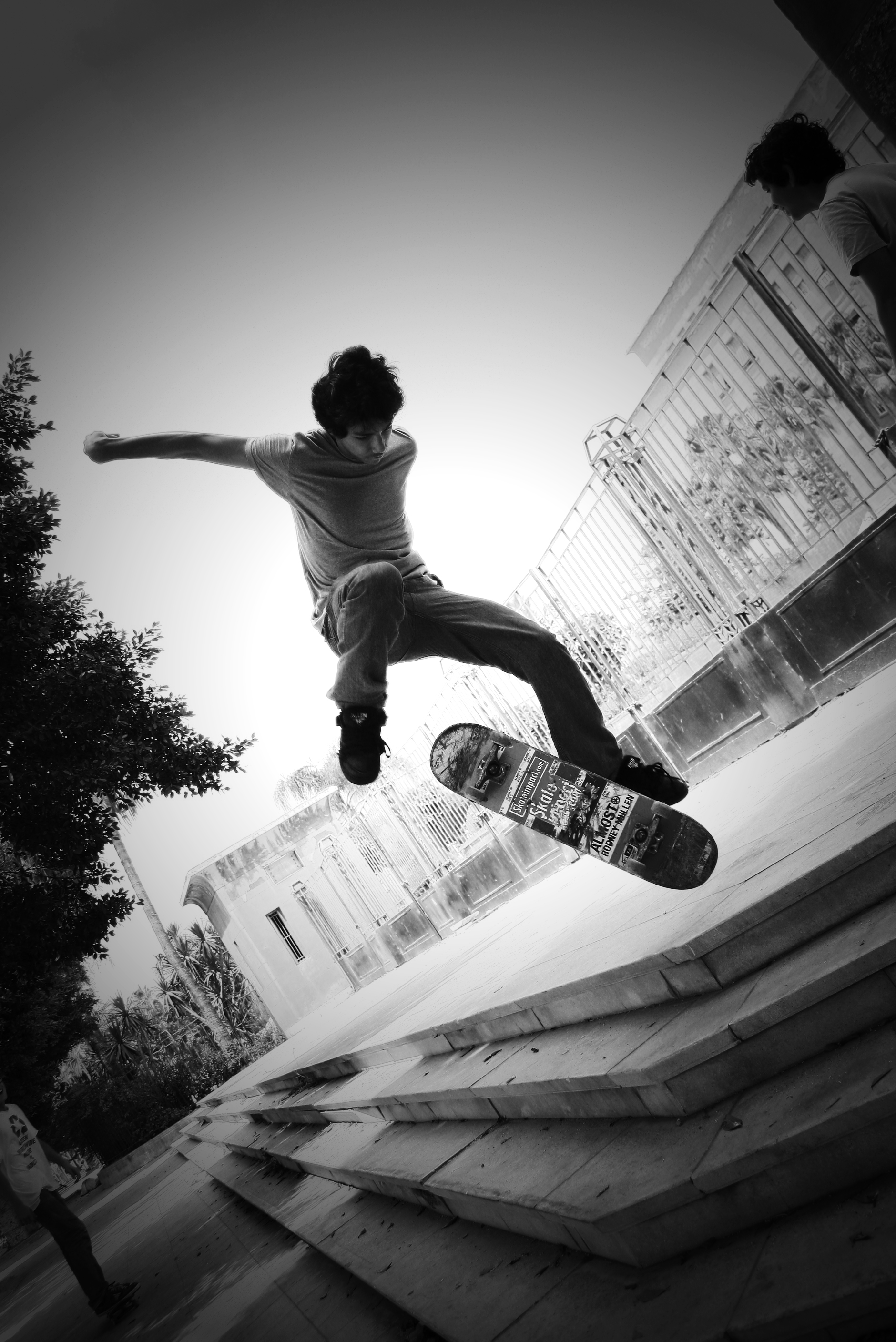
A skateboarder performing a trick.

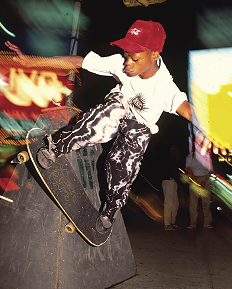
Harold Hunter wallrides in New York City.

Skate photography or skateboarding photography is the act of photographing skateboarding. Skate photography has been an integral part of skateboarding since its inception, used as a way to document and share the skateboarding tricks performed by skateboarders. Influential skate photographers include Skin Phillips, Glen E. Friedman, Dobie Campbell, Spike Jonze, Tobin Yelland, and Mike O'Meally.

== History ==
In 1965, Life magazine had an article on skateboarding with photographs of skateboarders in Central Park taken by Bill Eppridge. In the early days of skate photography, magazines were a primary way skate photography was disseminated via skate magazines, zines, and write-ups in mainstream media. The advent of the Internet slowly eroded away at skate magazines' dominance of skate photo dissemination. Photo and video sharing social media, such as YouTube, Twitter, and Instagram; in addition to self-published websites such as Crailtap, altered the landscape of skate photography. In March 2019, the print edition of Transworld Skateboarding ceased publication, leaving Thrasher as the last remaining in-print mass market skate magazine. Thrasher publishes more than 10,000 skate photos in print and online each year.
