= Patti McGee =

American professional skateboarder (1945–2024)

- McGee on the October 1965 issue of Skateboarder

Personal information
- Born: Patricia Ann McGee; August 23, 1945 Fort Lewis, Washington, U.S.
- Died: October 16, 2024 (aged 79) Brea, California, U.S.
- Occupation: Skateboarder
- Years active: 1957–1970
- Spouse(s): Glen Villa; William Chase
- Children: 2

Sport
- Country: United States
- Sport: Skateboarding
- Team: Hobie/Vita Pak
- Turned pro: 1965

Patricia Ann McGee (August 23, 1945 – October 16, 2024) was an American professional skateboarder. In 1964 she set a world speed record for women's skateboarding and became the first women's champion in the sport. She was the first woman professional skateboarder and the first woman inducted into the IASC Skateboarding Hall of Fame.

== Early life and career ==
Patricia Ann McGee was born at the Fort Lewis Army post in Washington state, where her father was stationed at the time. She grew up in San Diego. Her first skateboard was built by her brother in wood shop from her own shoe skate as a surprise. Her second skateboard was a Bun Buster. In 1965 in the magazine Skateboarder, McGee recalled the first time she saw a skateboard and executed her first maneuver:

I saw my first skateboard about two years ago during Easter vacation when I was at the Hollywood Teen Fair. I had been asked by a sporting goods store to give away a skateboard every evening. One evening the kid who did the skateboard demonstrations didn't show up and they asked me to take his place. So in front of 1,500 kids I did my first skateboard demonstration—it was just a kick turn, but skateboarding was new then and nobody else knew many tricks then anyway.

While on the Cooley Team, and standing on a Bun Buster, McGee set the world record for the fastest woman on a skateboard at 47 miles per hour (76 km/h) during Dick Clark's World Teen Fair 1964, held at the Orange County Fair Grounds in California. She won the first women's skateboarding championship the same year, in Santa Monica; by then she had adopted a handstand as her signature board trick.

McGee was the first female professional skateboarder. She was paid by Hobie/Vita Pak to travel and demonstrate the Hobie skateboard on a national level. This lasted almost a year until the craze subsided. During the tour, McGee appeared on the occupation-guessing TV game show What's My Line? on May 16, 1965, without a skateboard (but did not stump the panel), and with a skateboard on The Johnny Carson Show the following evening. McGee was featured on the cover of Life magazine May 14, 1965, and the cover of the fourth issue of Skateboarder in October 1965.

== Recognition ==
In 2010, McGee became the first woman inducted into the IASC Skateboarding Hall of Fame. A picture book about her life by Tootie Nienow, There Goes Patti McGee!, was published in 2021.

== Personal life and death ==
After living in Lake Tahoe for a time, McGee lived for many years in Cave Creek, Arizona, near Phoenix. She and her husband Glenn Villa had two children; her daughter Hailey Villa also became a skateboarder. She later remarried to William Chase, who predeceased her.

McGee died from complications of a stroke at her home in Brea, California, on October 16, 2024, at the age of 79.
