= John Lamb (producer) =

American artist and entrepreneur

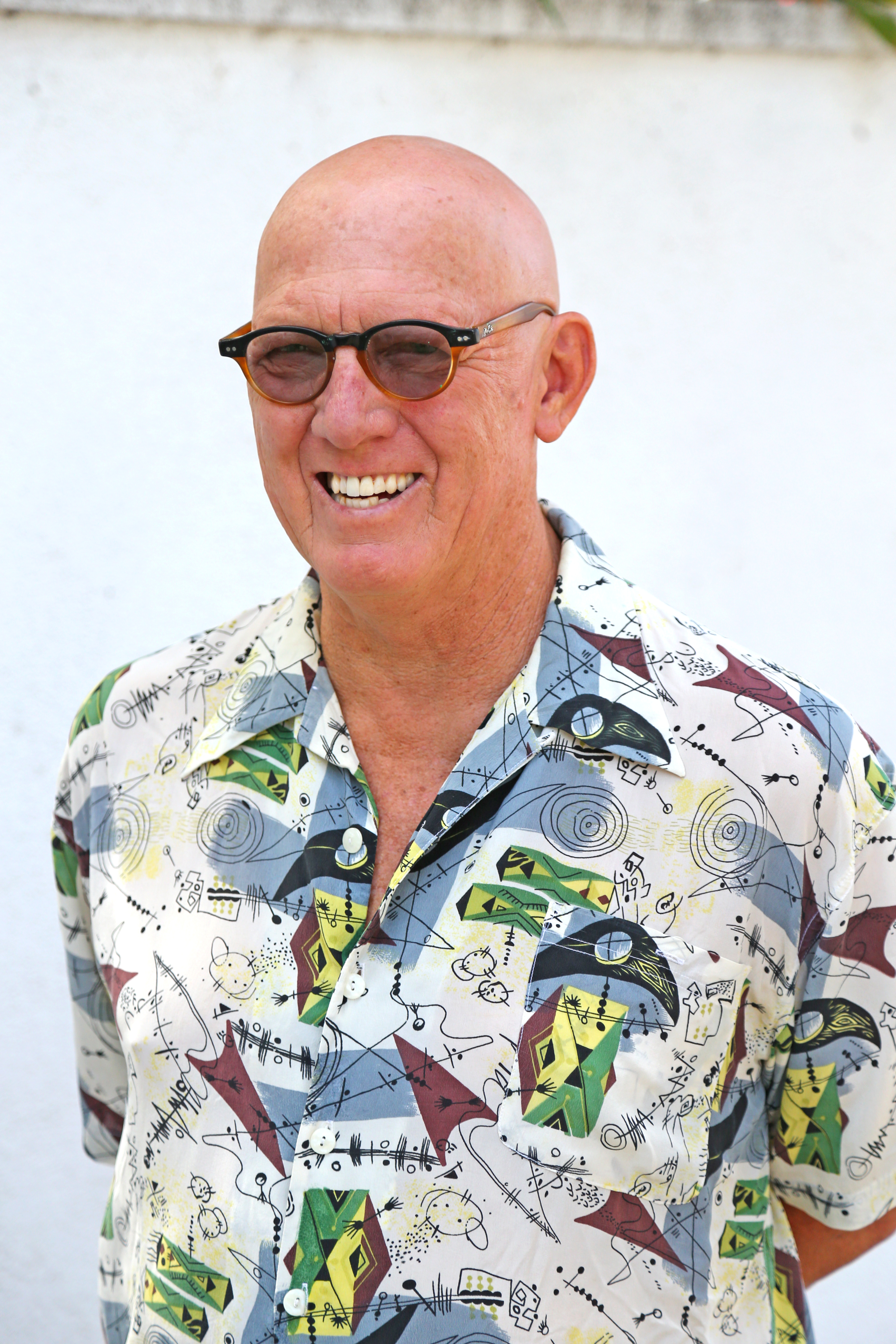
- Photo by Zack Cordner, 2017
- Born: John Charles Lamb; August 1952 (age 74); California
- Occupations: Artist, Author, Animator
- Children: Gabby Lamb
- Awards: Emmy®; Academy Award®
- Website: https://johnlambartist.com/

John Lamb is an American artist, author and animator. Lamb received an Academy Award and an Emmy for co-invention of the Lyon Lamb Video Animation System, with Bruce Lyon. Lamb is also known for creating Tom Waits for No One, Tom Waits' first music video, which is also the first known American animated, rotoscoped music video.

Early in John's animation career, his first film Secret Spot (1974) introduced Willy Makitt, Lamb's trademark animated surfer. Secret Spot features an aerial maneuver where the surfer rides up the face of the wave, into the air, and lands back on the wave to continue surfing. This maneuver was pure imagination at the time, and is now a standard trick in the world surf community. Lamb's animated short Rocket 88 also features Willie Makitt doing a "shuvit" maneuver, which would later become a standard trick among skateboarders. The "shuvit" shows Willy Makitt kick-flipping the surfboard, causing it to spin - he then lands it to continue the ride. In 1975, Willy Makitt was licensed by Hang Ten and featured on their fiberglass skateboards, which can be seen in an NBC newscast on the "new" skateboarding phenomenon.

In 1976, Lamb created a psychedelic animation sequence for the feature film documentary Spinnin' Wheels, by Chris Carmichael. The title sequence includes a blond-haired guy blazing a joint, while snaking up a mountain road in his yellow Porsche (modeled after Chris Carmichael's own Porsche). At the top, he steps out of the car barefooted, grabs his skateboard and bombs the hill at top speed. Going so fast, he flies off the road into mid-air, and through Spinnin' Wheels logo. The film includes surfing and skateboard greats, like Rabbit Bartholomew, Larry Bertlemann, Bruce Logan, Brad Logan and many others.

In 2010, Lamb and Secret Spot were honored by the California Surf Museum in Oceanside, CA with a permanent installation. Hand painted by Lamb, with a bigger-than-life wave scene and classic hot rods, tikis, palm trees and jungle scene, Willy Makitt is featured at the peak of the giant wave. The Secret Spot installation plays host to art openings and premieres of all types at the groundbreaking museum. The installation also features the work of Brett Hazzard, who created the "footprints in the sand" and breathtaking beach effect, which completes the installation's unique experience. See the mural's start and sky-bending finish on YouTube.

== Lyon Lamb Video Animation System ==
In 1976, Lamb co-invented the Video Animation System (VAS), through his company Lyon Lamb. Soon after, Lamb set out for his most ambitious animation project: Tom Waits for No One, featuring Tom Waits singing "The One That Got Away" from his LP Small Change. Using his newly invented Video Rotoscope, Lamb animated live footage of Tom Waits, creating what appears to be the first American, rotoscoped music video. Released in 1979, and largely hidden from the public eye for decades, the video would eventually see a second life when it went viral among Tom Waits fans on YouTube almost 30 years later.

In 1979, Lamb was honored with an Academy Award® for Scientific and Technical Achievement for co-inventing the Lyon Lamb Video Animation System (VAS) - (shared with Bruce Lyon). The VAS is a single frame video device for pre-testing animation drawings before they are committed to film for final production.

With the invention of the Lyon Lamb VAS, an animation revolution began. One example, a master animator uses the VAS to demonstrate a human "walk cycle" for his students.

In February 2024, Lyon Lamb won an Emmy® for Pioneering Development of Inexpensive Video Technology for Animation.

== Companies ==
Lamb is the founder several ventures including animation, graphic design, clothing design, licensed apparel, fine art and public murals.

In 1980, Lamb founded Animation Controls, releasing a competitive product to the Lyon Lamb VAS. In the 1980s, he founded John Lamb Productions, which merchandised and licensed Lamb's stylized, humorous drawings. During that same period, Lamb also designed apparel for international companies Adidas, Nike, L.A.Gear, Puma, Body Glove, Bugle Boy, Jimmy Z, Maui and Sons, Hang Ten and Bear Surfboards, among others.

In the late '90s, Lamb co-founded Bobtown Ink, with veteran Disney director Russ Mooney, producer Brian Ray and award-winning director John Kafka. They produced and created many original content shows for clients such as Disney, Universal, Nickelodeon, Sun Woo, Hanna-Barbera, Cartoon Network, MGM, and Sony.

In 2013, Lamb's work moved into the gallery with "Blast from the Past", a series of post-WWII California-style images of hot rods, surfboards, classic cars and beach scenes set against the backdrop of one of America's most conspicuous images: the atomic plume. Printed on the same type of material from which the Enola Gay was made, the images represent an ironic commentary of life after the A-bomb. Linksoul Lab in Oceanside, CA hosted the opening for "Blast From the Past".

== Books ==
In 2015, Lamb published Tom Waits For No One: The Illustrated Scrapbook, a collection of art, photographs and rock n roll artifacts from the making of Tom Waits For No One. The Illustrated Scrapbook was a limited edition hard cover, published independently by Big Buick Press. The book tells the story behind the film, the animators, the music and the artist, Tom Waits.

In 2016, Tom Waits For No One was featured at the 10th Anniversary of Animation Volda, a prominent animation festival Norway (September 22–25, 2016). The film was shown for the first time since 1980, and honored with a gallery opening dedicated to the art, animation cels and drawings from Tom Waits For No One.

In 2024, John published "The Varmits", a children's book originally written by his identical twin, Dave Lamb, in 1970. "The Varmits" is a humorous morality tale about being kind, sharing, and having good manners. "The Varmits", John and his grandson were featured on "The Zevely Zone", and the heartwarming story was aired on CBS stations across the US.

== Television ==
In 2017, live action footage from "Tom Waits For No One" was featured in the BBC's "Tom Waits: Tales From a Cracked Jukebox"
