= Waverunner (disambiguation) =

A WaveRunner is a brand of personal watercraft made by Yamaha.

Waverunner or wave runners may also refer to:

== Transportation and vehicles ==
- Personal watercraft (PWC), or jetski, also called waverunners

== Arts and entertainment ==
- Wave Runner (arcade game), a 1996 jetski racing Sega arcade game
- Wave Runner, a 2015 album by Capsule
  - "Wave Runner", a 2015 song by Capsule off the album Wave Runner

== Sports ==
- The Waverunners, a pro-wrestling tag team; see List of former Future of Wrestling personnel
- Wasatch Wave Runners, a Samoan swim club; see List of Samoan records in swimming
- Wave Runners, New Jersey, USA; a swim team in New Jersey Swimming
- Broward Waverunners, Broward County, Florida, USA; a baseball team in the Florida Winter Baseball League
- Daytona Waverunners, Daytona Beach, Florida, USA; an American Football team in the Women's Football Alliance
- Long Beach WaveRunners, Long Beach, California, USA; a soccer team in the IGLFA; see List of IGLFA member clubs

== See also ==
- Waverider (disambiguation)
- Jet Ski (disambiguation)
- Runner (disambiguation)
- Wave (disambiguation)
