= Yeah Right! =

2003 skateboarding video by Ty Evans and Spike Jonze

- DVD cover
- Directed by: Ty Evans; Spike Jonze
- Produced by: Megan Baltimore
- Cinematography: Ty Evans; Tom Lohmann
- Edited by: Ty Evans
- Music by: Sam Spiegel
- Distributed by: Girl Films
- Release date: April 17, 2003
- Country: United States
- Language: English

Yeah Right! is a 2003 skateboarding video by Girl Skateboards (featuring Chocolate Skateboards), directed by Ty Evans and Spike Jonze. Yeah Right! is notable for its soundtrack, length, and the extensive use of never-before-seen (in a skateboarding video) special effects. In his book Skateboard Video, Duncan McDuie-Ra considers Yeah Right! one of the four "finalists" of the skateboard video canon.

== Summary ==
A short prologue pays tribute to skater Keenan Milton, who died in 2001. Milton was part of Chocolate Skateboards team, a subset of Girl Skateboards.

The introduction credits for the video feature a unique series of shots in ultra-slow motion, filmed with Jonze's personal camera that is capable of shooting 100 frames per second. The camera is low to the ground and very close to the skateboarder as various flip tricks are completed. In this sequence a different skater is shot landing on the skateboard noticed by the different shoes on the feet that appear to land each trick.

Although Yeah Right features mainly skateboarding, there are many special effects used. There are several different scenes in between skaters' parts which make use of green screen technology like the "invisible skateboards" bit and other camera effects such as the "magic board" and the "Skatetrix" bits.

A cameo is made by Owen Wilson. He is in a parking lot with Rick Howard, Eric Koston and Mike Carroll preparing to perform a trick on a handrail. By framing the camera very carefully, it appears that Wilson attempts a backside bluntslide. However, while the camera was facing the opposite direction for a moment, Wilson had slipped out of the frame and is replaced by Eric Koston who is wearing a wig and matching clothes. Koston performs the trick down the staircase and Wilson reappears in the shot after Koston lands to make it look like he completed the trick.

== Cast ==
Yeah Right! features the Girl Skateboards team, along with Chocolate Skateboards.

(in order of appearance)

- Keenan Milton – memorial section before the intro of the film (Milton rode for Chocolate until his death in 2001).
- Brandon Biebel
- Brian Anderson
- Marc Johnson – Chocolate section
- Chico Brenes – Chocolate montage
- Jesus Fernandez – Chocolate montage
- Daniel Castillo – Chocolate montage
- Chris Roberts – Chocolate montage
- Ricardo Carvalho – Chocolate montage
- Scott Johnston – Chocolate montage
- Richard Mulder – Chocolate montage
- Kenny Anderson – Chocolate montage
- Mike York – Chocolate section
- Justin Eldridge – Chocolate section
- Gino Iannuci – Chocolate section
- Robbie McKinley
- Guy Mariano – Girl "Veterans" montage
- Rudy Johnson – Girl "Veterans" montage
- Tony Ferguson – Girl "Veterans" montage
- Jeron Wilson – Girl "Veterans" montage
- Rick Howard – Girl "Veterans" montage
- Paul Rodriguez
- Jereme Rogers
- Mike Carroll
- Rick McCrank
- Eric Koston
