= J. Grant Brittain =

American photographer and skateboarder

- Born: July 28, 1955 (age 71)
- Occupation: Skateboarding photographer
- Years active: 1979–present
- Website: jgrantbrittainphotos.com

J. Grant Brittain (born 1955) is a photographer internationally recognized for his work documenting skateboarding. Brittain has been shooting skateboarding for over 30 years.

== Skateboarding ==
In his early 20s, Brittain got a job at the Del Mar Skate Ranch, starting work on the second day the skatepark was open.

== Photography career ==
Brittain began photographing skateboarding in 1979 at Del Mar. Brittain photographed many professional skateboarders skating at Del Mar including Tony Hawk, Steve Caballero, Mike McGill, and many others. Brittain became one of the first professional skate photographers to make a living photographing skateboarding.

In 1983, Brittain helped found Transworld Skateboarding working as an editor and senior photographer.

While working at Transworld, Brittain also provided content to creators of self-published skate zines, such as Steve Caballero's SPEED Zine, published in the mid 1980s.
