= Skate Rider =

Skateboarding magazine

Cover of Volume 1

Skate Rider was a quarterly skateboarding magazine of the 1970s which originated out of Cocoa Beach, Florida, published by Gunnar and John Griffin who had launched Wave Rider magazine several years earlier. Skate Rider was founded in 1976 and lasted until 1980 when the popularity of skateboarding began to plummet.

== History ==
The first issue of Skate Rider was published in Winter 1976. John Griffin served as editor of the magazine and its first staff photographers included Rob Battipaglia and Michael Cassidy. Skate Rider was most important for its role in documenting a large number of East Coast riders and contests that were never covered by any of the other magazines. It would notably become the first magazine to publish a photo of Alan Gelfand before he became a famous public figure, the South Florida skater associated with the creation of the Ollie (skateboarding trick).
