= Jereme Rogers =

American professional skateboarder (born 1985)

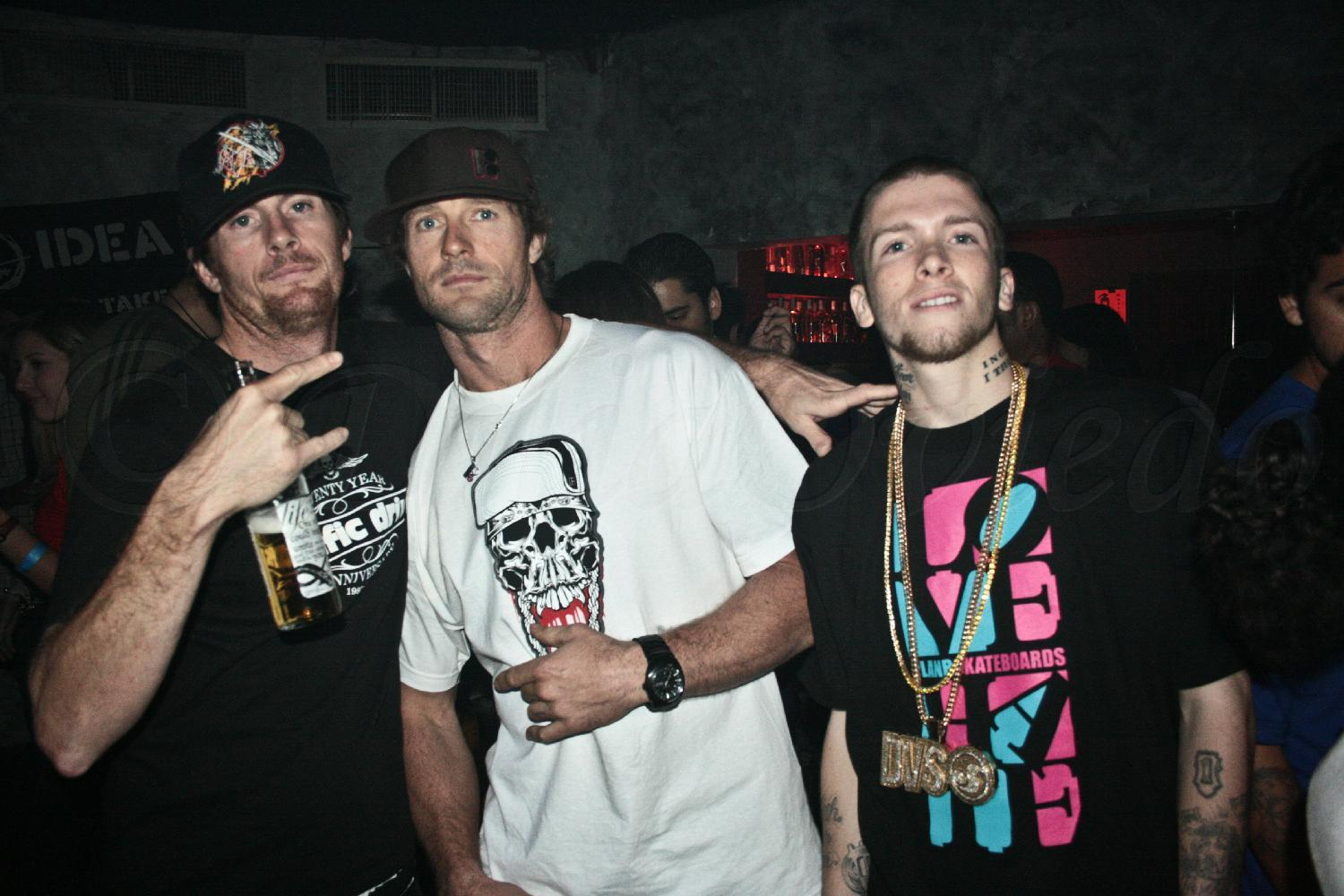
- Jereme Rogers (right) with Pat Duffy and Danny Way, 2007 (photo: Dilia Oviedo)
- Born: January 13, 1985 (age 41); Boston, Massachusetts, United States
- Occupation: professional skateboarder

Jereme Rogers (born January 13, 1985) is an American professional skateboarder, well known in the skateboarding sub-culture for his early retirement and rap music production.

Rogers returned to professional skateboarding in June 2010 with a press release announcing his own company, Selfish.

== Biography ==
=== Early life ===
Rogers was born and raised in Boston, Massachusetts, United States (US). He primarily skated at a local skatepark called Eight Ball Skatepark in Bellingham, Massachusetts and was sponsored by Concrete Wave Skate Shop.

=== Professional skateboarding ===
Following Rogers' participation at a series of demos by the DVS Shoes team, Jeron Wilson (DVS team member) obtained Rogers' name and phone number. Rogers then left school at the age of fifteen and relocated to Los Angeles, California, US, to pursue his skating career.

Rogers retired from professional skateboarding in June 2009 to focus on a musical career. On May 4, 2010, Rogers announced that he would return to skateboarding and will do his music career at the same time.

== Video parts ==
- Girl: Harsh Euro Barge (2002)
- Girl: Yeah Right! (2003)
- Girl: High Fives Up The i-5 (2004)
- DVS: Skate More (2005)
- Chocolate: Hittin' Britain & Oui Will Rock You (2005)
- Jereme Rogers' Neighborhood (2006)
- DVS: Dudes Dudes Dudes (2008)
- short edit: "A Day at Court" featured on Thrasher Magazine in February 2016.

== Awards ==
Rogers was named Transworld's 2005 Rookie of the Year.

== Media ==
=== Television ===
Rogers was in Rob and Big season two "Tampa", as well as Bad Girls Club season four as Natalie's "friend". Most recently, Jereme was on Thrasher Magazine's "King of the Road" (2015 filming; 2016 release via Vice Media) series as a guest skater. He had previously featured on "King of the Road" as a team member of Girl Skateboards.

=== Video games ===
He is also featured in the video game Tony Hawk's Proving Ground.

== Personal life ==
Rogers is a vegetarian and a Christian (one of his tattoos on his neck reads "In God I Trust"). He continues to run Selfish Skateboards.

== Controversy ==
Rogers resigned from the Girl skateboard company following his assertion that the company was withholding skateboard deck royalties. Following his departure from the company, Rogers claimed that his royalties were being used to compensate for losses in other areas of Girl's business.

In March 2014, Jereme was arrested on charges of assault and battery for his alleged participation in a beating at Los Angeles nightclub Lure. He was found not guilty in March 2015, although he was sued in civil court by the victim of the melee.
