= Tom Waits for No One =

- Directed by: John Lamb
- Starring: Tom Waits
- Release date: 1979
- Country: United States
- Language: English

Tom Waits for No One is a rotoscoped short film starring Tom Waits, singing "The One That Got Away" to an apparition.

Directed in 1979 by John Lamb, it is the first rotoscoped music video, and was released two years before the advent of MTV. It was meant as a test and demonstration of an analog video rotoscope system, a new way of doing rotoscoping since Max Fleischer invented it in 1915. The film, inspired by a performance of Tom Waits at the Roxy in May 1977, captured a first-place award at the first Hollywood Erotic Film and Video Festival in 1980. The film never saw commercial release and sat in obscurity for 30 years, when it went quietly viral on YouTube.

Filmed live at the La Brea Stage in Hollywood in six takes, 13 hours of footage taken from five cameras were cut down to a little under six minutes, which was then converted into handdrawn animation, one frame at the time, by 12 people over six months. This particular combination of rotoscoping and pencil test, originally developed for Ralph Bakshi's American Pop, was considered innovative at the time, and assisted in winning Lyon Lamb a 1980 Academy Award for Scientific and Technical Achievement.

The film's production team consisted of a wide range of industry professionals which includes:

- David Silverman: David was the first animator on The Simpsons, working with Klasky-Csupo on Simpsons interstitials for The Tracey Ullman Show, later to produce The Simpsons, The Wild Thornberrys and Monsters, Inc.
- Keith Newton (rotoscope and character design): Keith went on to greater heights with Disney Animation doing backgrounds and character design for Pocahontas.
- Micheal Cressey (inker): Micheal went into a distinguished career of children's book publishing, writing 8 books and receiving the coveted Caldecott Award twice, among numerous others.
- Garrett Smith (live action camera): Garrett moved into an illustrious career at Paramount Studios and became an integral part in the development of HD with Texas Instruments.
- Gary Beydler (live action camera): Gary was an esteemed film maker, photographer and fine artist with works in the MMA and Moca, and a Newsweek cover article.
- Donna Marie Gordon (dancer/model): Donna became a choreographic trainer for Las Vegas chorus girls for 18 years.
- Ray Roberts extended his fine art talents and today is a renowned Plein Air painter and multiple award winner for his depictions of the Southwest.
- Garrett Smith served as vice president, production technology and digital mastering operations at Paramount Pictures. He was actively involved in the development of DVD, HDTV and a member of Digital Cinema Initiatives. Today, Smith is a member of the Academy of Motion Picture Arts and Sciences, and serves on the Science and Technology Council as Co-Chair of the Next Generation Technology Project.
- John Lamb received an Emmy® (2024) and Academy Award® (1979) for co-inventing the Video Animation System (VAS). Lamb also developed and manufactured the first video rotoscope system in 1979. Continuously working in the graphic arts and animation, Lamb recently published a children's book, "The Varmits", which shows children the importance of kindness and friendship.

Recently, a cel from Tom Waits for No One became part of the Tom Waits permanent exhibit at the Rock and Roll Hall of Fame in Cleveland, Ohio.
