= Ledo Pizza =

American pizzeria restaurant chain

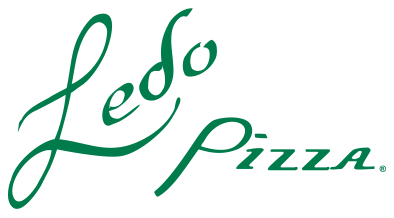
- Type: Private
- Industry: Pizza, Pizza Delivery
- Founded: 1955; 71 years ago Adelphi, Maryland, U.S.
- Founder: Robert Beall and Thomas Marcos
- Headquarters: Annapolis, Maryland
- Number of locations: 116, as of May, 2023
- Key people: Jamie Beall (President, COO); Aaron Weedy (VP - Finance); Will Robinson (VP - Marketing); Mike Conway (VP - Operations)
- Website: ledopizza.com

Ledo Pizza is an American pizza restaurant chain in the Mid-Atlantic and Southeastern United States headquartered in Annapolis, Maryland. Their first pizzeria was opened in Adelphi, Maryland, in 1955 on University Boulevard (Maryland Route 193) in Adelphi Shopping Center near the University of Maryland, College Park (38°59′5.5″N 76°58′1″W). The first franchise was granted to the Fireside Restaurant in Berwyn Heights, Maryland, in 1979. Fireside Restaurant no longer exists. There are now over 100 restaurants in Maryland, Virginia, West Virginia, North Carolina, South Carolina, Florida, New York City and Washington, D.C.

== Overview ==
Ledo Pizza is rectangular in shape and is known for its very thin crust, sweet sauce, thick pepperoni (one per slice; optional), and smoked provolone cheese.

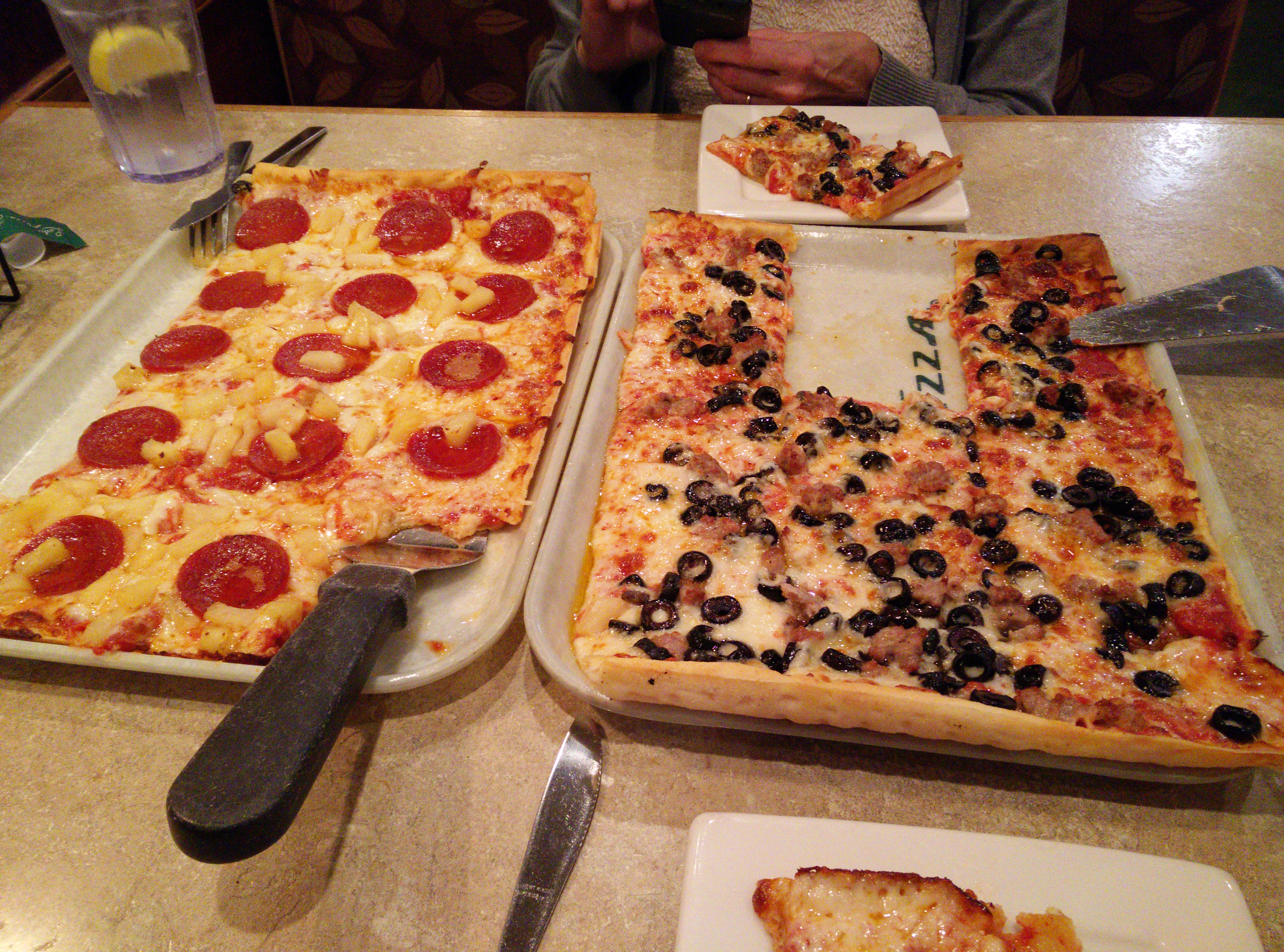
Pizzas from Ledo Pizza

The original location in Adelphi, Maryland, at the Adelphi Shopping Center was established in 1955.

In 2006 the Ledo chain sued the Marcos family claiming that they illegally used the Ledo name and trademark to sell food, resulting in a financial loss.

In September 2009, the Marcos family announced that the original Ledo restaurant would be moving a few miles from its original location to downtown College Park. The original location closed in July 2010, and the new location opened for business on August 27, 2010. The College Park restaurant closed in November 2020 and reopened a year later as a Ledo franchise location.

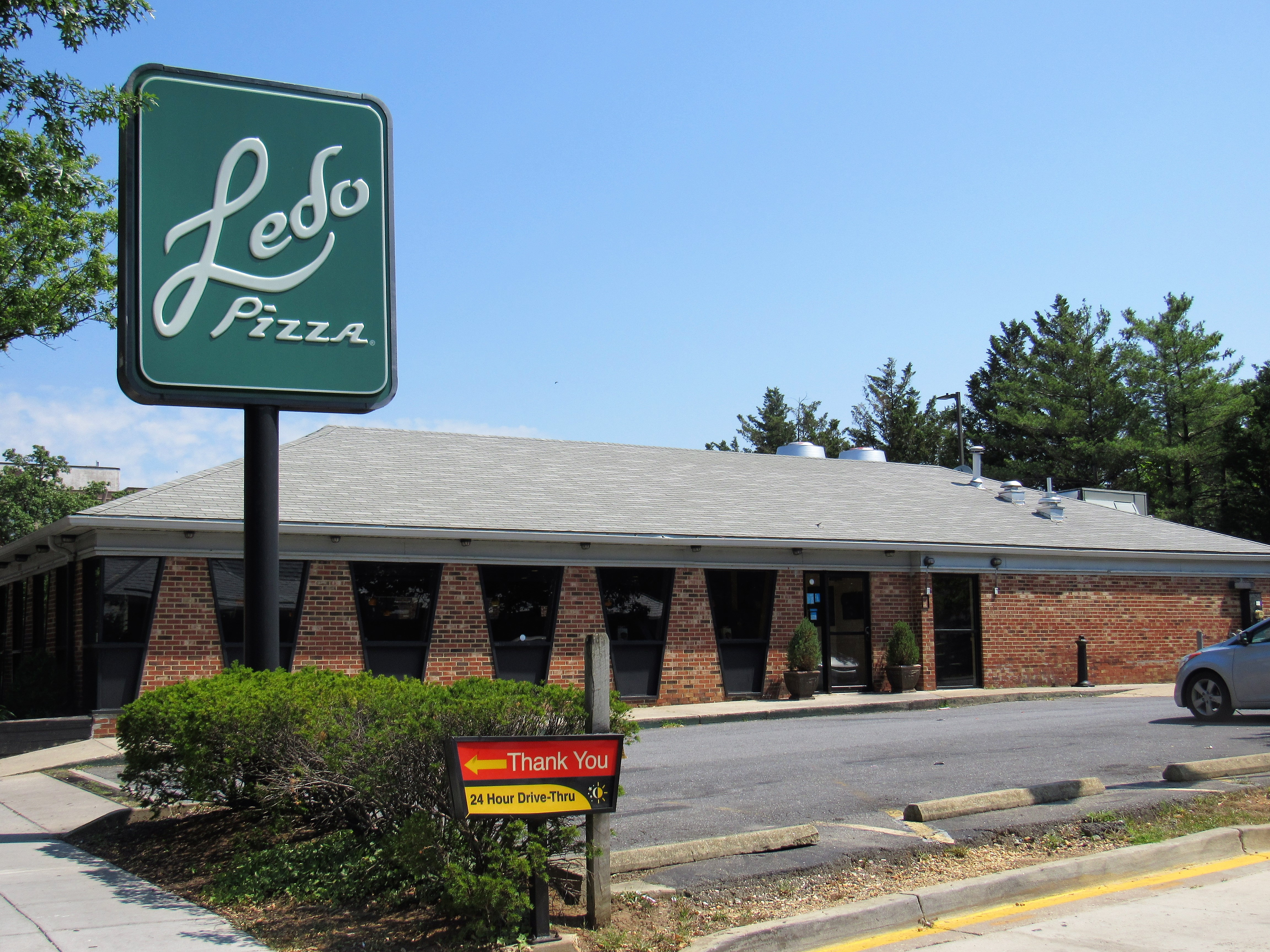
Standalone franchise in Washington, D.C.

In February 2024, Ledo Pizza reached a multi-year sponsorship agreement with the Baltimore Orioles.

== Recognition ==
In 2019, Ledo Pizza was rated #31 on the Pizza Today Top 100 Companies list with 2018 gross sales of $120,000,000 from its 106 restaurants. Ledo Pizza was named among the best pizzas in America on The Oprah Winfrey Show.
