= 1980 Academy Awards =

1980 Academy Awards may refer to:

- 52nd Academy Awards, the Academy Awards ceremony that took place in 1980
- 53rd Academy Awards, the 1981 ceremony honoring the best in film for 1980
