= Luca Giammarco =

Italian slalom skateboarder

Luca Giammarco, from Italy, is the top-ranked slalom skateboarder in the world. A multi-talented competitor, Giammarco was a competitive rock climber and placed in the 1999 and 2001 UIIA World Cup climbing competitions. In 1989, he earned 3rd place in the Slalom event at the World Championships of Skateboarding (the first year that Tony Hawk made the podium in this competition, placing 1st place in the Pro Half-pipe.) Giammarco was the # 1 slalom skateboarder in world in 2003, dropped to 3rd in 2004, and regained his #1 overall position in 2005.
