= Kawasaki Jet Ski (video game) =

2008 video game

- European box art
- Developer: Data Design Interactive
- Publishers: EU: Data Design Interactive; NA: Bold Games
- Platforms: Wii, Windows
- Release: NA: 22 January 2008; EU: 25 April 2008
- Genre: Racing
- Mode: Single player

Kawasaki Jet Ski is a video game for the Wii console, released in 2008. It was created by Data Design Interactive, a budget developer.

== Reception ==
Kawasaki Jet Ski has generally received negative reviews, as well as negative ratings. It received a 2.0/10 at IGN, and a 3/10 at GamesRadar. It has been criticized for poor graphics and unresponsive controls.
