= Hubba Wheels =

Hubba is a skateboard wheel company that has sponsored many professional skateboarders over the years. Hubba has a product line of more than 30 different wheel models. Along with wheel models, Hubba also sells a variety of soft goods, for example T-shirts and calendars, as well as specially designed skateboard grip tape, and colored skateboard hardware. Hubba uses a wide cast of female models for their ads, which lures in a large percentage of their fan base. These women are also featured on the annual calendar.

== History ==
Hubba Wheels was founded by Fausto Vitello, the founder of Thrasher and skateboard wheel company Spitfire Wheels.
