= The Skateboard Mag =

American skateboarding magazine

- March 2006 Cover of Skateboard Magazine
- Editorial director: Dave Swift
- Categories: Skateboarding
- Frequency: Monthly
- Circulation: 90,000 (2005)
- Publisher: Strictly Skateboarding
- First issue: April 2004
- Final issue: 2017
- Company: Strictly Skateboarding
- Country: Solana Beach, California, United States (US)
- Language: English
- Website: http://www.theskateboardmag.com/
- ISSN: 1548-3975

The Skateboard Mag was an independently published American skateboarding magazine that published over 100 issues (in 2005 its circulation was approximately 90,000) and featured professional skateboarder Danny Way on the cover of its inaugural issue, depicted mid-air while executing a gap to noseblunt slide on a construction known as the "Mega Ramp". As of February 2005, the publication was owned by a group that consists of seven partners, while the magazine employed eleven full-time staff members. In 2014, it became a part of a website and in 2017, its existence on the website stopped.

== History ==
Internal tensions between the Transworld Skateboarding magazine staff and AOL Time Warner owners prompted the resignation of several key editorial members, including Mike Mihaly, J. Grant Brittain, and Dave Swift. Later, The Skateboard Mag Founding trio was later joined by TransWorld Skateboarding Senior Photographerer Atiba Jefferson, who then sought financial backing from publishing veteran Preston Murray. With that backing they launched The Skateboard Mag publication. (the first issue was published in April 2004). Jefferson, whose seminal mentor was Brittain, revealed in May 2012:

So, in 2006, we were all working at Transworld with Dave Swift, Grant ... Brittain. I think I'd gotten to the point—you've done everything you kinda could. And, with that magazine being bought and sold that many times, and being corporate-owned, a lot of things had changed. Even when I started working at Transworld, it was just owned by the bombers; it was independently owned. It was just different, it wasn't the same. There was a lot of things that became very corporate about it. And that was just-it is so hard to do with skating. There were so many things we couldn't justify. So we decided to break off and start out own magazine, The Skateboard Mag, in 2006.

Jefferson's view was reinforced seven years prior in an interview that Brittain participated in with the Union-Tribune, whereby Jefferson's mentor stated, "We did not like the whole corporate deal, not knowing what was in every issue ad-wise. It wasn't about skateboarding anymore."

Other key members of The Skateboard Mag who moved across from TransWorld Stance Magazine included Art Director, Ako Jefferson (Atiba Jefferson's brother), writer, Kevin Wilkins, and Transworld Publisher, Mike Mihaly (the three had worked a combined total of forty-four years for Transworld Publications). The first issue was released in March 2004, Issue #1 April 2004.

As of October 2016, the editorial director of the magazine was Dave Swift, who is a current skateboard photographer and had worked for Transworld Skateboarding as Editor-In-Chief, Staff Writer and Staff Senior Photographer.

Veteran skateboard photographer Grant J. Brittain confirmed on October 7, 2014, that the Skateboard Mag publication, of which he was a photo editor for, has reached a purchase agreement with the Berrics. The Berrics retained the combined majority ownership shares of Preston Murray and Mike Mihaly and negotiated earn-out agreements with Brittain, the Jefferson brothers and Kevin Wilkins. Brittain published the announcement on his Instagram account: "We started a new endeavor, the Skateboard Mag is under The Berrics skateboarding umbrella." Following this, the magazine ceased publication and became part of the website Berrics.

== Mission statement ==
The Skateboard Mag's mission statement stated that it :

Seeks to maintain the independent nature and integrity of the skateboard culture at all levels, provide readers with a broad, accurate, and knowledgeable view of skateboarding, and advance skateboard publishing through excellence in photography, writing, and design.

In a February 2005 interview, the magazine's three primary founders, Brittain, Swift, and Mihaly explained the ethos of the magazine and the main points of distinction from their former employer by stating that the target audience is "hardcore skateboarders", while Transworld retains a tendency towards the mainstream aspect of skateboarding culture. Mihaly explained: "We don't have any beef with those guys. We've been doing what we're doing for a year and realized we can all coexist. The further we can separate the umbilical chord from them the better."

== Digital photography ==
The launch of The Skateboard Mag coincided with the popularization of digital photography in skateboarding and Atiba Jefferson has revealed that he made the shift upon his commencement at the publication:

You know, it's really funny, because, at Transworld I did my film, Cross-Process, you know, it was really funny, because right when The Skateboard Mag came is when digital photography came ... right when that magazine started is right when I almost switched over to a 100 percent digital. Which gave me a whole different look again ... which really changed the way that my photography looked."

== Free Fabes campaign ==
In October 2012, the magazine assisted with the "Free Fabes" campaign, organized by the DGK skateboard company for former professional skateboarder and actor, Fabian Alomar. Alomar, who was a member of the now-defunct Menace skateboard team (founded by Kareem Campbell), was arrested on a non-violent drug possession charge in Hollywood, California, United States (US). The magazine also uploaded unseen footage of Alomar from the 1990s.

== Location ==
As of February 2013, the headquarters of The Skateboard Mag was located in Solana Beach, California, US.

== See also ==
- Skateboard
- Flip tricks
- The Berrics
