= Sessions (clothing company) =

US apparel company

- Founded: 1983; 43 years ago
- Founder: Joel Gomez
- Headquarters: Santa Cruz, California, United States
- Parent: Leonian Singapore Pte. Ltd. (from 2015)

Sessions is an apparel company that designs, develops, produces and markets action-sports based products primarily in the snowsports industry as well as young men's and women's clothing. Sessions is headquartered in Santa Cruz, California, United States.

== History ==
Joel Gomez, a skateboarder from Santa Cruz, began his retail career in 1983 by opening the country's first snowboard shop in Sunnyvale, California selling his now famous Sessions star logo patches as well as punk rock records and t-shirts.

In 1985, Sessions started an alternative rock music mail order business. The Sessions music mail-order catalog was often included as a circular with Alternative Press, SPIN, and other American music magazines, coinciding with the rise and acceptance of underground college and alternative rock by mainstream media. In 1989, Sessions received an order of 300 pairs of pants from a customer in Japan after Terry Kidwell was photographed with a Sessions patch on his snowpants. This kickstarted Sessions outerwear production and the local shop to an internationally recognized brand. In the late 1980s, Cindi Busenhart joined Sessions and later served as president, playing a key role in the development of the company’s outerwear division and overall brand growth. She later became a co-owner of the company and contributed to its community and philanthropic initiatives. Sessions was also the first action sports company to create a record label, Sessions Records. Sessions Records featured collectable 7" vinyl records. Some of Sessions Records notable releases were from artists including Fu Manchu, Gwar, AFI, Swingin' Utters, Audioslave, No Use For A Name, Supersuckers, Descendents and Foo Fighters. Sessions Records also released several compilation albums including Snoisses Vol. 1, Snoisses Vol. 2, Steve Caballero Bandology Vol. 1 and more. Sessions Records was active between 1995 and 2005.

Today, Sessions sells snowsports apparel that includes snowboard jackets, snowboard pants, layering, gloves, hats, shirts and related products.

In 2015, the Sessions brand was purchased by Leonian Singapore Pte. Ltd., a company that runs retail chains, sporting goods, apparel and golf driving ranges.
