= Wave Riders Association of Afghanistan =

Wave Riders Association of Afghanistan (WRAA) is the Afghan governing body in charge of surfing in the country. It was founded in 2012 and joined the International Surfing Association (ISA) in 2014. The Afghan national championships, which were sponsored by the agency, were held in May 2015 in Ericeira, Portugal.
