= Skateboarding sponsorship =

Commercial practice

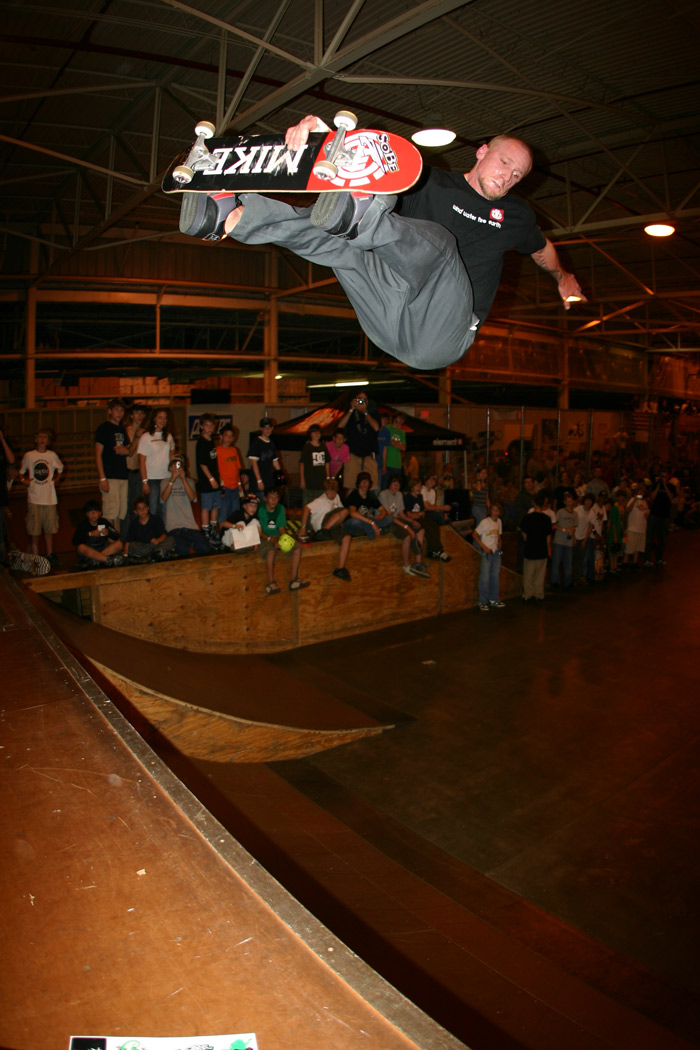
Professional skateboarder Mike Vallely riding a customised MIKE skateboard from then-sponsor Element Skateboards in 2006.

Skateboarding sponsorship is the commercial sponsorship of an individual or team of people who participate in skateboarding, competitions or public activities. Typically, the individual or team will receive cash payments, reduced-price or free merchandise or equipment from a sponsor in return for public and in-competition use of that sponsor's merchandise or equipment for promotional purposes and recipient testimonial or endorsement. Skateboarding sponsorship may also extend to the sponsorship of major competitions or venues (like specific skateparks) by larger distributors or manufacturers of skateboarding equipment and merchandise.

Sponsors employ a variety of methods in an effort to "discover" potential sponsorship recipients including word of mouth, the solicitation of "sponsor-me" videos and direct participation in public skateboarding events and competitions, as well as raising awareness through social media websites.

In the United States it is recommended that an organisation wishing to engage with Skateboarders via sponsorship apply to join the IASC. This allows a company to join, take part in and become credible within an already well established industry.

== Sponsorship types ==
There are two generally recognised classes of individual skateboarding sponsorship. Amateur and Professional. Both can come in different variations and can be agreed contractually in both verbal or written form.

=== Skate shop sponsorship ===
Skate shop sponsorship is sponsorship by a local professional skateboarding industry retail company. Obligations under the terms of a shop sponsorship vary but are usually light and the rider usually represents the sponsor by wearing branded apparel and by submitting media (videos and photographs) for use in advertising campaigns. Shops commonly employ skateboarders and sponsor their employees. This occurs along with traditional discounts to subsidise pay or as part of an employment agreement. Some simple sponsorship agreements may involve the provision of discounted merchandise or equipment in exchange for a commitment to use that merchandise or equipment at public skate parks or local competitions.

Skate shops may sponsor both amateur and professional skateboarders.

=== Amateur sponsorship ===
Amateur skateboard sponsorship involves the light provision of merchandise and equipment along with the occasional payment of travel and accommodation or living expenses when representing a sponsor in an out of town competition. Amateur skateboarders are not paid to skate and many are too young in any event, as per law.

A sponsored amateur skateboarder may receive some personal promotion as a brand "team member" and will commonly exchange marketing rights to their image for skateboarding equipment and other merchandising and or skateboard products.

=== Company flow sponsorship ===
Flow sponsorship is similar to shop sponsorship in that it generally involves the sponsorship of an individual by a small to medium commercial skateboard company or enterprise. However, flow sponsorship usually involves the provision of free merchandise (no cost to the sponsored individual) but the offer is not traditionally consistent or long term. Flow sponsorship is seen as one of the first stepping stones of opportunity which an aspiring professional skateboarder might accept on their journey to become pro. And is often used as an incentive before a skateboarder joins a team whilst they are considering all available offers from interested parties. The trade of goods mostly revolves around featuring in print, online and video based media. Personal appearances are rarely part of any agreement and the aim of a flow sponsorship is to give the skateboarder a hand into the industry to help them on to a path involving a career. By 2003, then-6-year-old Mitchie Brusco was committed to 9 such agreements.

=== Professional company individual sponsorship ===
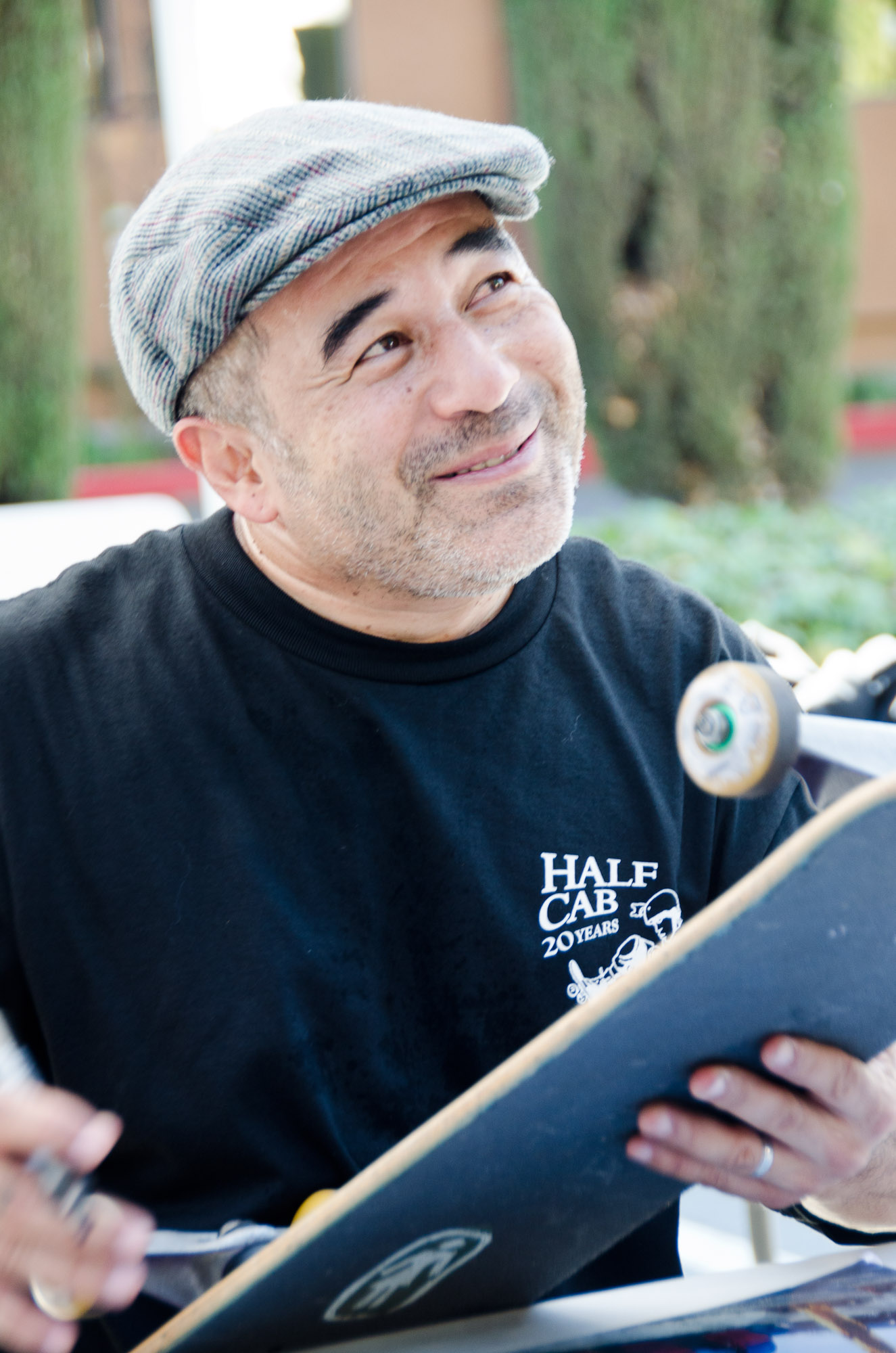
Professional skateboarder Steve Caballero signing merchandise.

Professional sponsorship is sponsorship attached to royalty payments and comes with a regular salary in all but the worst of contract formats. Contracts vary but coverage of living expenses which allow the skateboarder to travel and practice to be able to compete on a full-time basis without the need to work full-time, may be factored in. Healthcare, image rights, bonuses, product design and art work licensing are commonly covered in professional skateboarding contracts. Sponsored skateboarders receive monthly packages of sponsored merchandise (including additional merchandise for promotional uses) and equipment (including customized "pro model" equipment) as well as branded clothing and other promotional items which feature the sponsored skater's name or personal logo.

Professional skateboarders may receive royalty payments collected against products sold by their sponsor(s) which display the skateboarder's name or logo. Traditionally endorsed products are professional grade decks, trucks, clothing, shoes and wheels. It is normal for a rider to primarily attach to a single deck manufacturer as a pro and professional model skateboard products tend to display the professional skateboarder's name prominently in painted or transferred graphics. Deck sponsorship is seen as a primary long term goal and a right of passage by aspiring amateur skateboarders. Obtaining one signifies current prominence within the skateboard industry.

Professional skateboarder Tony Hawk signed endorsement and sponsorship deals with a number of major brands worth up to US$15 million each, including deals with a number of non-skateboarding brands most notably the Tony Hawk's series of video games published by Activision.
