= Jenkem Magazine =

Skateboard magazine and media outlet

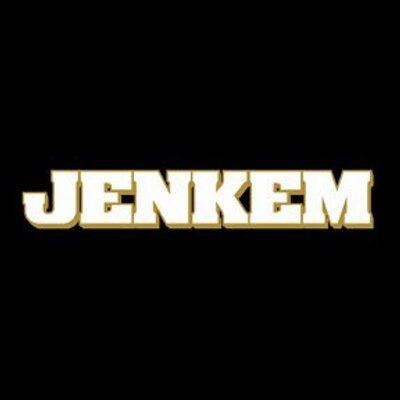
- Website type: Online magazine
- Available in: English
- Owner: Ian Michna
- Website: jenkemmag.com
- Commercial: Yes
- Launched: 2011; 15 years ago
- Current status: Active

Jenkem is an online skateboarding and culture magazine founded in 2011 and operated from Brooklyn, New York. The website features interviews with professional skateboarders, industry professionals, graphic artists, and musicians, as well as video segments, mixtapes, podcasts, essays on skateboard history, and an online clothing store. They have published two full length books of essays and interviews, and maintain a record label that features skateboarder musicians.

== History ==
Jenkem was founded in 2011 by Ian Michna in response to a perceived lack of unique content in skateboard media. It first attracted attention after publishing an interview with professional skateboarder Jereme Rogers and its articles have since been mentioned in the New York Times, Vice, Gawker, and XXL. It has published interviews with the professional skateboarders Andrew Reynolds, Mike Carroll, Bam Margera, and Marc Johnson and been one of a few magazines to cover LGBT professionals. Other notable work includes interviews with Dan Mancina, a blind skateboarder, Ali Jusovic, who skateboards on his knees, a history of the decline of skateboard plazas within the United States, and a video of Kanye West skateboarding.

== Website ==
Jenkemmag.com features regularly updated columns, music mixes, and video premiers from throughout the skateboard community.

- “Hanging out with”
- “Jenkem Mixes”
- “Premiere”

== Beginnings - A Jenkem Record ==
Jenkem magazine released a music compilation series titled "Beginnings - A Jenkem Record" in 2017. The series features bands fronted by skateboarders and was released on Vinyl.

Label: Jenkem Released: 2017
Format: Vinyl
Genre: Hip Hop, Electronic, Rock

- Darling Din - "Lost Kids"
- Shirtless - "Less I See"
- Girl Tears - "Sedated"
- Mr. Alexis - "Still Need U"
- Soudiere - "Highed Up"
- Grate Lakes - "Look At You"
- Poptartpete - "Lovely Day"
- Danny Boy - "Blue Color"
- Josiah Gatlyn - "M-Theory"
- Godchild - "Hesoclean"
- Adeodat Warfield - "After Bloom Night"
- Xolo - "Okay"
- Sleepy Eyes - "Sleepstakes"
- D Tiberio - "Jerome"
- Mary - "Silent Flower"
- Ghost Foot - "Wounded Son"
- Las Hermanas - "IV"
- Tai Khanor - "Tricky Sleeve"
- Alaskan Tapes - "The Things We Do"
