= Skate Jawn =

American skate magazine

- Founded in: Philadelphia, PA
- Categories: Skateboarding
- Frequency: bimonthly
- Circulation: 5,000
- First issue: 2010
- Based in: Brooklyn, NY
- Language: English
- Website: skatejawn.com

Skate Jawn is a skateboarding magazine founded in Philadelphia, Pennsylvania, in 2010 by Marcus Waldron. Skate Jawn produces a bimonthly magazine as well as a yearly photo issue. Skate Jawn releases video content and premieres skate videos via its website.

== Magazine history ==
Originating as a black and white, east coast-focused skate zine originally described as a "jawn about skateboards made by some dudes." As of 2021, Skate Jawn prints 5,000 copies per issue in full color. The magazine gets its name from the Philadelphia term "jawn", meaning thing or person. The original name of the magazine was Skate Jawn Mag Jawn, shortened after the second issue to Skate Jawn.

=== Collaborations ===
In 2019, DC Shoes and Skate Jawn collaborated on a Skate Jawn themed Lynx model skate shoe. In 2021, Skate Jawn and OJ Wheels collaborated on a tour, merchandise, and a video featuring Brian O'Dywer.
