= Rubicon Skateboards =

Skateboarding company

Rubicon Skateboards was created in 2005 by two brothers, Greg and Geoff, from Hampshire. Rubicon operates the first skateboard school in the United Kingdom and are the biggest and most active provider of skateboard lessons in the country.

== Location ==
Based out of Winchester, Rubicon have regional instructors around the country including Tony Da Silva (Harmony Skateboards, DC Shoes, Note Skateshop). Other professional UK skateboarders who have worked with Rubicon include Greg Nowik and Callum Bowran (UK Freestyle Champion).

== Work ==
Rubicon work with children aged 6 to 18 through primary and secondary schools, but have also established partnerships with several county councils. They are unique to the UK in that they always travel to whoever wants to learn, as opposed to working out of a single skatepark.

They have worked with companies such as BSkyB (doing a Living for Sport programme to help children who feel disconnected from education get involved again through sport), the BBC (as part of their Blast Tour programme to engage children in creative pursuits) and the Duke of Edinburgh Scheme (skateboarding is now on the options syllabus and monitored by Rubicon). In total, the Rubicon team has provided over 500 lessons to around 4,000 children.

== Camps ==
Rubicon Skateboards were also the first company to bring skateboarding-specific residential week long camps to the UK. Previously, skateboarding had been included within other general sports weeks. Camps involve trips to a number of large parks and include daily tuition from the instructors. The 2008 camps are based near Coventry and will visit the Stoke on Trent Plaza and the Works Skate Park in Leeds.

== Sponsorship ==
Rubicon sponsored the first ever Girls Skate Comp at NASS08. The National Adventure Sports Show is Europe's biggest action sports and music festival. Results were: Helena Long 1st, Sam Bruce 2nd, Lois Pendlebury 3rd with Sam picking up Best Trick with a frontside boardslide down the rail over the G gap into the bank.

Rubicon sponsored the Winchester City Skate Jam on 7 June 2008.

== Media Appearances ==
Rubicon Skateboards appeared in a wide selection of national press recently for their work with the Hampshire Police Force. The community success led to interviews and coverage with America's ABC News Network and their "Good Morning America" programme.

== Other documented groups Rubicon have worked with ==
Sports England along with Brighton & Hove Council organise Active for Life with Rubicon.

Sportsfest and Rubicon promote equality within sport.

Department for Environment, Food And Rural Affairs (DEFRA) and Rubicon promoting healthy lifestyles through non-traditional sports.

== Research ==
New research shows that the BSkyB "Living for Sport" project that Rubicon was involved in has been a great success.
