= Rayne Longboards =

Canadian longboard manufacturer

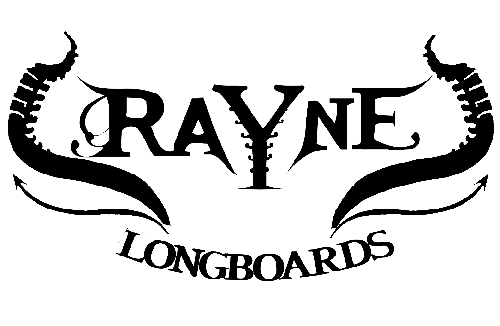

Rayne Longboards is a Canadian longboard manufacturer. Rayne Longboards products are made for downhill racing, freeriding, city riding, and long distance pushing.

== History ==
Rayne Longboards was established in North Vancouver, British Columbia in 2004 by owner and operator Graham Buksa, who began by producing longboard decks. The business later expanded to produce a wider range of products.

In 2008, Rayne developed a manufacturing system for producing boards entirely from bamboo and fibreglass.
