= Look Back Library =

Preservation organization

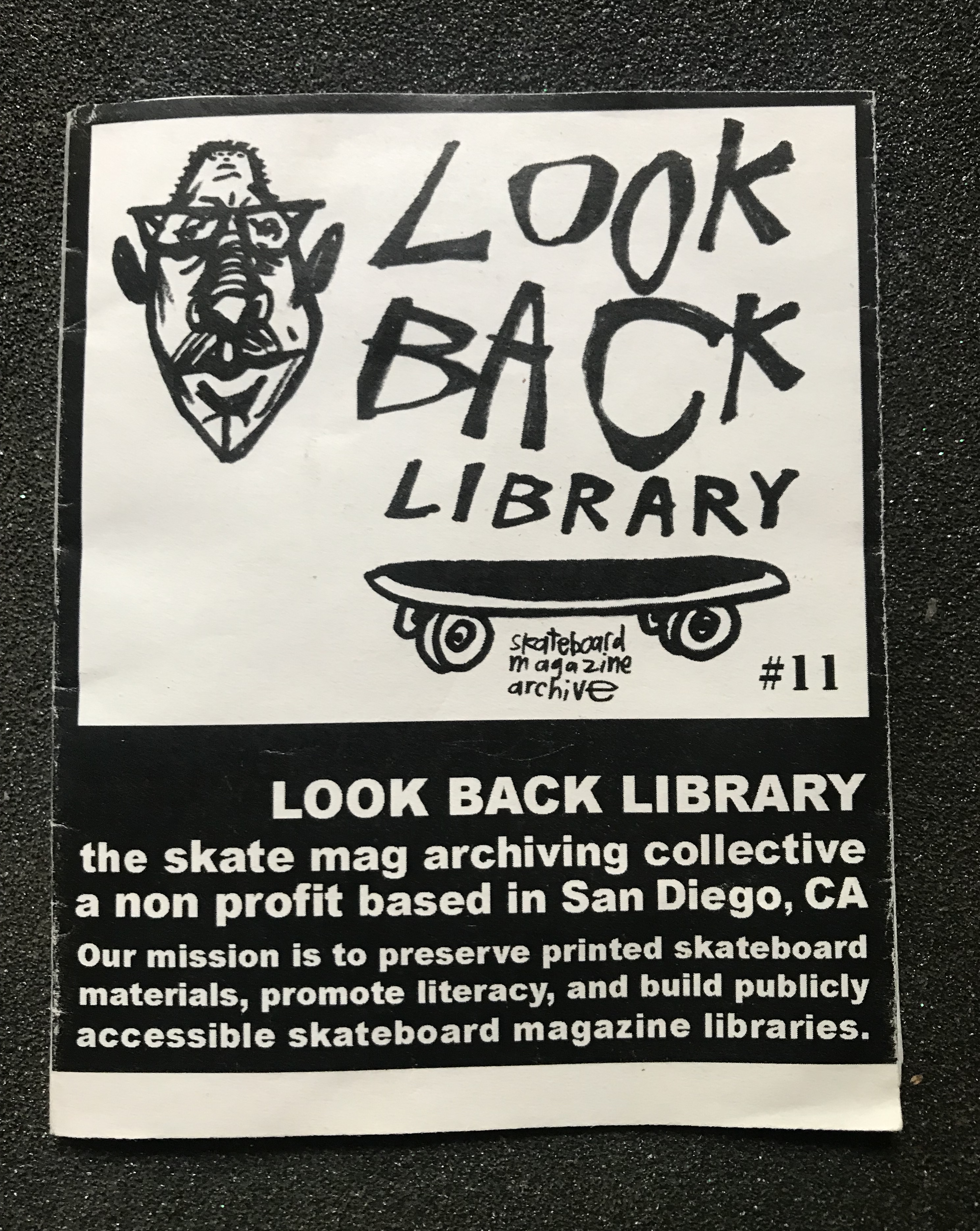
- Formation: 2015; 11 years ago
- Founder: Kevin Marks
- Type: Nonprofit organization
- Headquarters: San Diego, California, U.S.
- Staff: 1
- Website: lookbacklibrary.org

Look Back Library (LBL) is a non-profit organization dedicated to preserving the history of skateboard magazines, and other printed skateboard materials, through traveling exhibits and the building of publicly accessible skateboard magazine libraries.

== Mission ==
As a "Skate Mag Preservation Society" the Look Back Library aims to promote literacy and the appreciation of printed skateboard materials, particularly magazines. The LBL engages in community outreach through exhibits of classic skate magazines; as well as, installing skate magazine libraries at local Skate shops and other venues.

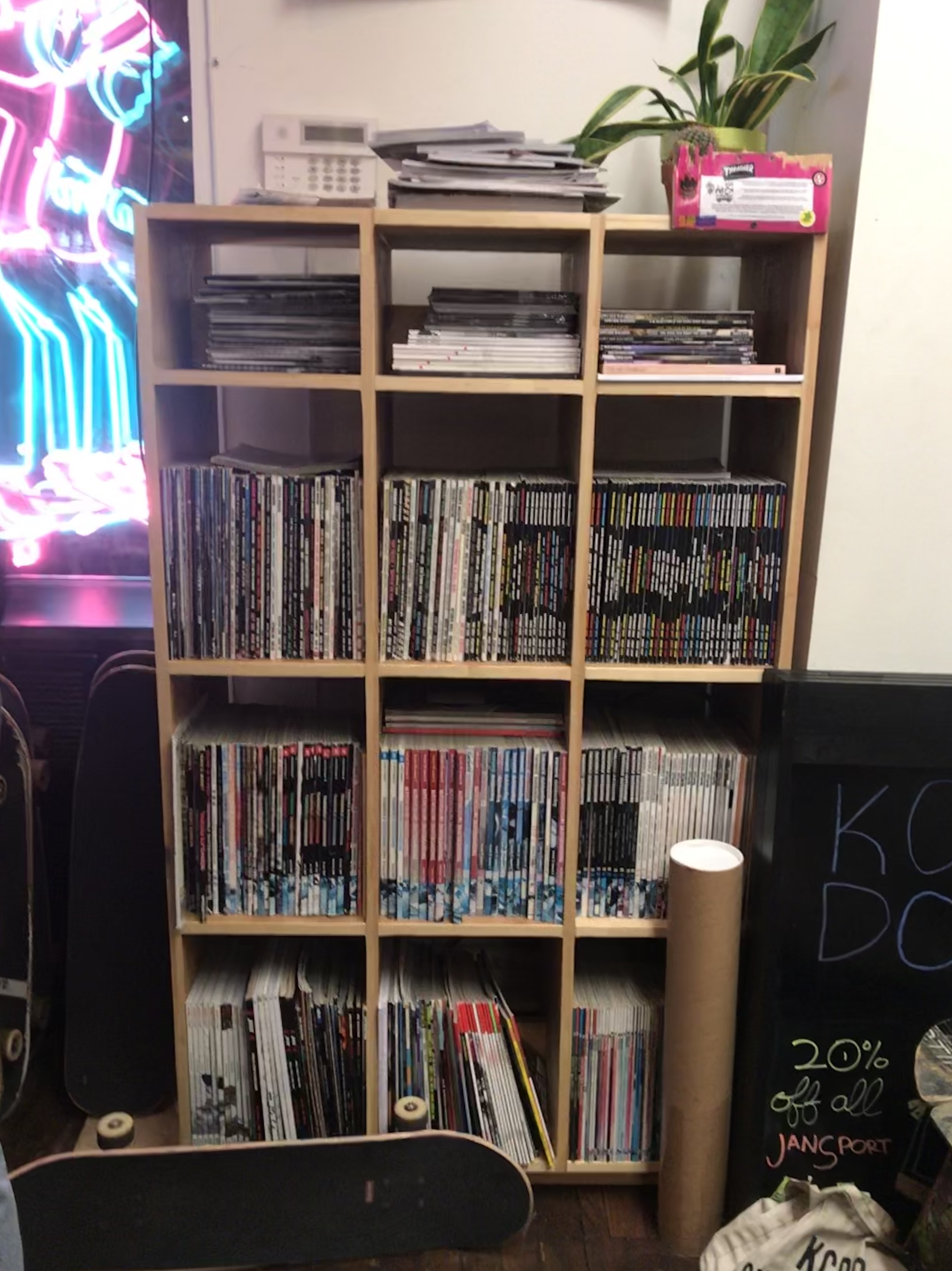
The Look Back Library at KCDC (skateshop) in Brooklyn, NY has many old and new issues of skate magazines from Thrasher to Strength to Slap.

== History ==
Founded by Kevin Marks in 2014, the Look Back Library originated from a pet project of Marks' to improve the skate magazine library at Launch, a community skate organization located in Fort Collins, Colorado. While improving the library at Launch, he noticed considerable interest from both readers and collectors. Marks conceived of the Look Back Library as a way to place the magazine duplicates he was accumulating into a space where the public could read them. The Look Back HQ is located in San Diego, CA, with Marks spending a good portion of the year traveling and installing libraries.

=== 41 Years of the Ollie ===
In 2019, Look Back Library travelled around the United States, touring a show titled 41 Years of the Ollie - a magazine cover exhibit exploring the history of the ollie.

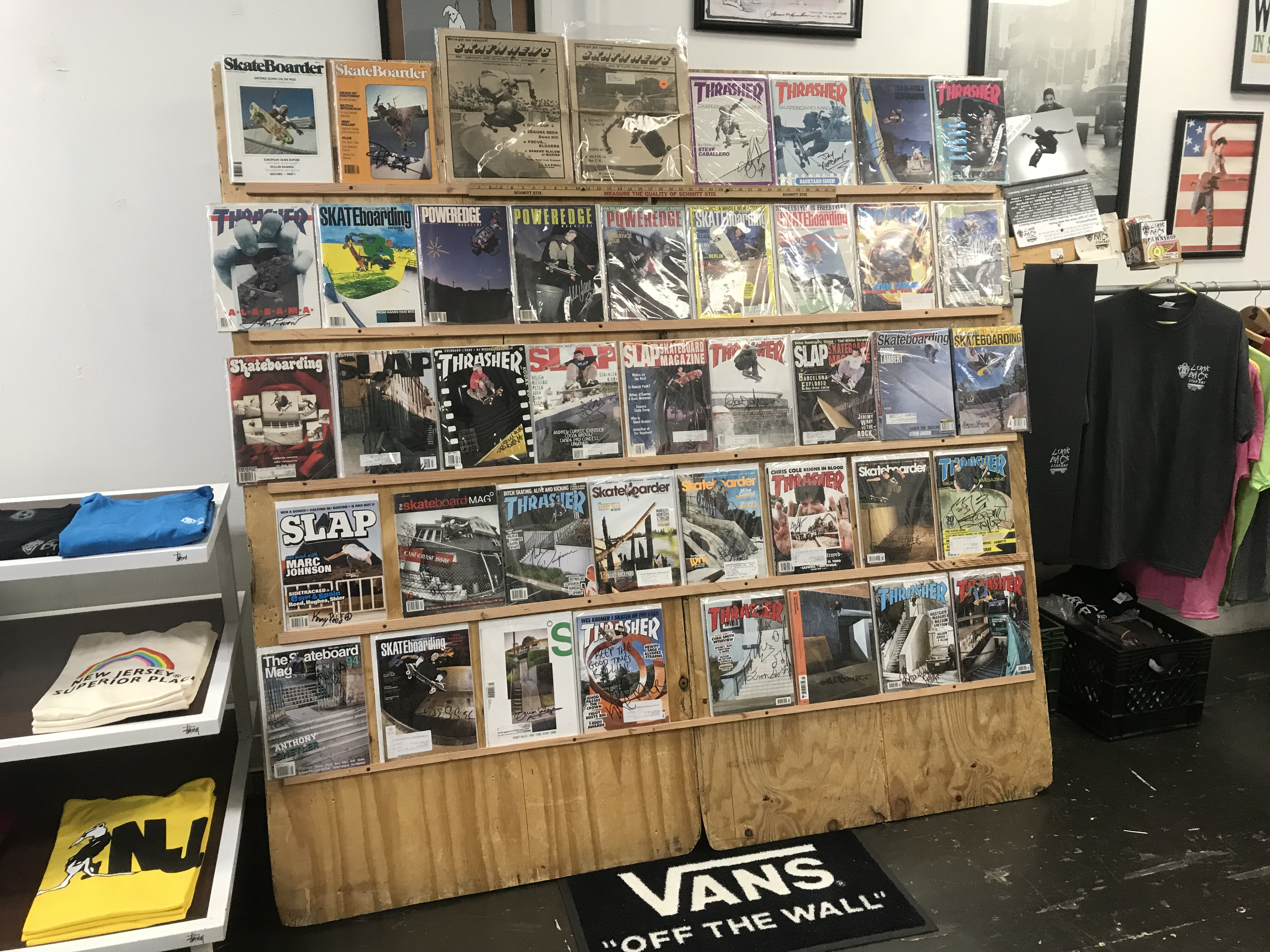
Look Back Library traveling exhibit of classic skateboard magazines at a skate shop in New Brunswick, NJ

== Libraries ==
=== California ===
- Slappy's Garage - San Diego
- Look Back HQ - San Diego, CA*
- Local Skate Shop - Lakeside
- The House Skate Shop - Vista
- Handplant - Laguna Beach
- Socal Skate Shop - Mission Viejo
- Focus Board Shop - Lake Forest
- Joker's Skate Shop - Huntington
- Next Up Foundation - Anaheim
- Contenders Boardshop - Orange
- Long Beach Skate - Long Beach, CA
- Transitions - Carson, CA
- Apt Skate Shop - Torrance, CA
- 3043 Board Shop - South Gate, CA
- South Bay Skates - Torrance, CA
- Unmodern Industries - Santa Fe Springs, CA
- The Garage Board Shop - Los Angeles, CA
- Six Stair - Los Angeles, CA*
- Overcast Skate Shop - Temecula, CA
- Kingswell - Los Angeles, CA
- Off Top - Los Angeles, CA
- Skate Punk Skate Shop - City of Industry, CA
- Pawn Shop Skate Co. - Covina, CA
- Crooks Skate Shop - Riverside, CA
- Skateboarding Hall of Fame - Simi Valley, CA
- Lighthouse Skate Shop - Santa Barbara, CA
- Impact Skate Shop - Bakersfield, CA
- Skate Works - Los Altos, CA
- Red Curbs Skate Shop - Fremont, CA
- The Orchid - Goleta, CA*
- Red Curbs II - Concord, CA
- San Francisco Skate Club - San Francisco, CA
- Mission Skate Shop - San Francisco, CA
- Proof Lab - Mill Valley, CA
- Brotherhood Board Shop - Santa Rosa, CA
- Street Science - Livermore, CA
- Kingpin Skate Shop - San Joaquin County, CA
- Woodward West - Stallion Springs, CA*
- Boulevard Skate Shop - Sacramento, CA
- Hangtown Board Shop - Placerville, CA

=== Washington ===
- Unknown Board Shop - Bellingham, WA
- All Together Skatepark - Seattle, WA

=== Oregon ===
- Shrunken Head Skate Shop - Portland, OR
- SOL SK8S - Bend, OR
- Windell's Camp*

=== Colorado ===
- Launch - Community through Skateboarding - Fort Collins, CO
- Curbside skatepark - Englewood, CO

=== New Mexico ===
- Microwave - Albuquerque, NM

=== Arizona ===
- Cowtown - Tempe, AZ*
- Mortal Skate Shop - Tucson, AZ

=== Virginia ===
- Cardinal Skate Shop - Norfolk, VA

=== Pennsylvania ===
- Switch & Signal Skatepark - Swissvale, PA
- Ignition - Lancaster, PA
- Holistic - Reading, PA
- Woodward EAST*

=== New York ===
- Krudco - Rochester, NY
- Jamestown Skate Products - Jamestown, NY
- KCDC - Brooklyn, NY

=== New Jersey ===
- NJ Skate Shop 1 - Jersey City, NJ
- NJ Skate Shop 2 - New Brunswick, NJ
- High Voltage Cafe - Asbury Park, NJ

=== Massachusetts ===
- The Edge Indoor Skatepark - Taunton, MA

=== Maryland ===
- Vu Skate Shop - Baltimore, MD

=== North Carolina ===
- Backdoor Skate Shop - Greenville, NC

=== Georgia ===
- Ruin - Dunwoody, GA

=== South Carolina ===
- Continuum - Charleston, SC

=== Florida ===
- The Boardr - Tampa, FL*

=== Texas ===
- Crooks - El Paso, TX
- AltaVista Skate Shop - San Antonio, TX
- Devotion Skateboard Company - Dallas, TX
- Deviance Skate Supply - Wichita Falls, TX
- Southside Skate Shop - Houston, TX

=== Oklahoma ===
- Nine One Skate - Tulsa, OK

=== Nebraska ===
- Precision Skate Shop - Lincoln, NE

=== Kentucky ===
- Riot Skatepark - Louisville, KY

=== Indiana ===
- Minus - Indianapolis, IN
- Rhett Skateboarding - Bloomington, IN
- Killer Skatepark - Evansville, IN

=== Tennessee ===
- Hunt Supply Co - Nashville, TN
- Sixth Avenue Skatepark - Nashville, TN

=== Ohio ===
- Tri-Star Skates - Cleveland, OH
- Demented Skate Shop - Liberty Township, Butler County, OH

=== Wisconsin ===
- Cream City Skatepark - Butler, WI
- Freedom - Madison, WI

=== Minnesota ===
- Familia HQ Skatepark - Minneapolis, MN

=== Illinois ===
- Ground Floor Skateboards - Rockford, IL
- Fargo Skateboarding - DeKalb, IL
- F A Skates - Prospect, IL

=== Kansas ===
- All City Skateboarding - Wichita, KS
- River Rat Skate Shop - Lawrence, KS

=== Michigan ===
- Plus Skateboarding - Farmington, MI

=== Missouri ===
- Missouri Vortex aka Hermann's Hole, near Hermann, MO*
- Escapist - Kansas City, MO

=== Canada ===
- Antisocial - Vancouver, BC
- ToplessPizza Shredquarters

=== Australia ===
- Hemley Skateboarding - Fitzroy, Victoria

Note: *libraries available by appointment only
