= Skate magazine =

A skate magazine, or skateboard magazine, is a magazine dedicated to skateboarding.

== History ==
The first mention of skateboarding in a magazine was in 1963 when the publisher of the “Surf Guide Magazine,” Larry Stevenson, published the first advertisement for skateboards in his magazine. The first skateboarding magazine “The Quarterly Skateboarder” was published in 1964. Skateboarder Magazine launched in 1975. In 1981, Thrasher Magazine was founded. Slap magazine existed as a monthly print magazine from 1992 through 2008. Concrete Wave Magazine was founded in 2002. In 2019, Transworld Skateboarding announced they were discontinuing their print magazine, continuing only as an online platform.

== Covers ==
In skateboarding, getting one's picture on the cover of a skate magazine is often a mark of success and pride.

== Advertising ==
Skateboard magazines sell advertising space to skate companies to advertise their goods. Before the internet, skate mags were one of the primary ways to learn about new skaters.

== Online magazines ==
Since the advent of the internet, many skate magazines shifted their focus online. In 2011, Ian Michna and Forrest Edwards founded Jenkem Magazine as an online skate magazine platform.

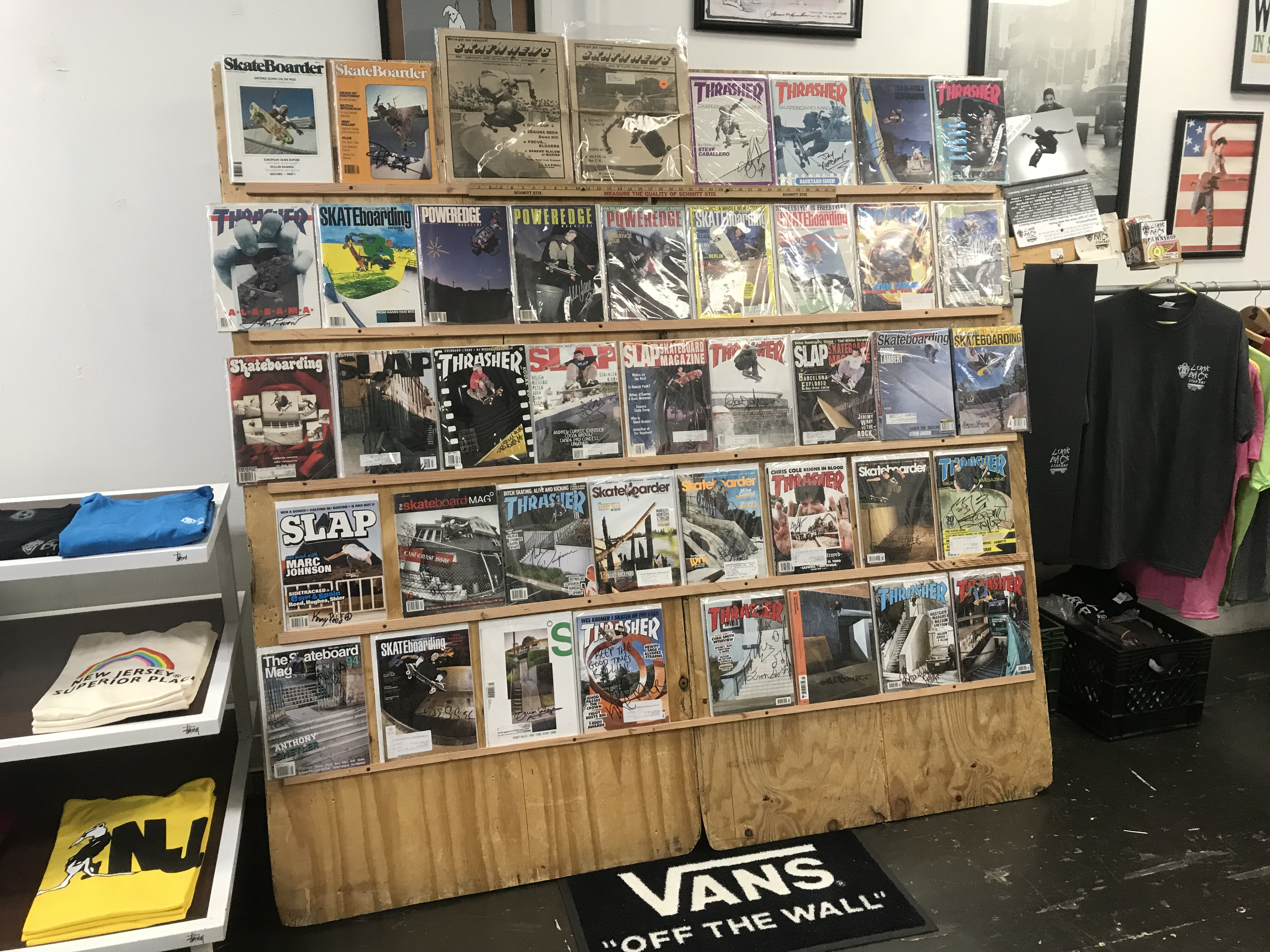
Classic skateboard magazines on display at NJ Skate Shop in New Brunswick, NJ

== Skate magazine archives ==
In an effort to preserve skate magazines, the Look Back Library was founded in 2015. The Look Back Library is a project promoting skate magazine history, literacy, and the appreciation of printed skateboard materials, particularly magazines, through community outreach such as exhibits and by installing skate magazine libraries at local Skate shops and other venues.

== See also ==
- List of skateboarding magazines
