= Color (skateboard lifestyle magazine) =

Skateboard lifestyle magazine

Color was a skateboarding lifestyle magazine published in Vancouver by Fourcorner Publishing Inc. Publication ceased in 2013, after 49 issues.

Edited by Sandro Grison, the magazine's writers included the Canadian short story writer Michael Christie.
