= Jimmy'z =

American clothing and lifestyle company

JIMMY'Z
- Type: Private
- Industry: Apparel
- Founded: Malibu Beach, California (1984)
- Founder: Jimmy Ganzer and Sepp Donahower
- Headquarters: Pacific Palisades, California, U.S.
- Area served: Worldwide
- Key people: Jimmy Ganzer, Founder; Blake Harrington (CEO/Director)
- Products: Skateboarding and surfing apparel
- Owner: Authentic Brands Group
- Website: jimmyzworld.com

JIMMY'Z is a clothing and lifestyle company founded in 1984 by Jimmy Ganzer and Sepp Donahower, known for its signature E-Z-In velcro closure shorts.

== History ==
=== 1984–1991: Origins ===
In the early 1980s, Jimmy Ganzer was a surfer and artist living in Malibu Beach, CA.

I slid into third base headfirst, got up, dusted myself off. And I went, “F***, why didn’t some surfer ever come up with an idea where the pants don’t fall off like this?” Inside of the waistband on these baseball pants was a woven nylon belting. That belting did not move. And I went “Wow, what if I used that belting and Velcro on the side over here?” And I stood there on third base for about that long. And I went, “That’s a good idea.”

The shorts he created became known as E-Z-In, E-Z-Out shorts, and the idea quickly took off, finding a natural home not only amongst surfers but in the skateboard community during the boom of the 1980s, as the lack of a belt buckle or button prevented discomfort while paddling out on a surfboard, bending to grab the board beneath your feet or when falling from a skateboard onto a hard surface.

During the 1980s, the brand grew, eventually sponsoring famous skateboarders such as Steve Caballero and Christian Hosoi. Jimmy Ganzer and partner Sepp Donahower sold the brand to Ocean Pacific in 1987, and then Ocean Pacific later sold it to a chain of multiple owners ending up with Aéropostale during skateboarding's downturn at the start of the 1990s. Aéropostale kept the brand going as an upscale surf-orientated brand, but ceased all activity in 2009.

=== 2011–present day: Revival ===
In late 2011, Blake Harrington, a fellow Californian surfer, joined forces with Jimmy Ganzer and reacquired the rights to the brand from Aéropostale. Together they restarted production of the original E-Z-In shorts, choosing styles and designs that would bring the idea up to date for modern skaters and surfers worldwide.

Today the company continues to sponsor a team of skateboarders across all disciplines (including Steve Caballero, who rejoined as soon as the company restarted production), and produces an array of T-shirts, tank tops, hoodies and hats to go along with their signature velcro closure shorts.
