= Wave Rider =

1970s surfing magazine

Cover of the Winter 1976 volume

Wave Rider was a quarterly surfing magazine from the 1970s. It was launched in 1975 by Gunnar Griffin and John Griffin in Cocoa Beach, Florida.

Staff photographers included Rob Battipaglia, Joaquin Garcia and Larry Marshall, as well as Sal Catania, who was a photo editor and staff photographer for a short period of time. Reggie Hodgson was the art director in the late-1970s.

Wave Rider covered international surfing as well as surfing on the East Coast of the United States.

Wave Rider ceased publication in 1982.
