= Concrete Wave Magazine =

Canadian magazine

Concrete Wave Magazine is a Canadian publication which was founded in 2002 by Michael Brooke. It was a continuation of Brooke's involvement with skateboard publishing. In 1999, Brooke had also his book The Concrete Wave (the history of skateboarding), published by Warwick Publishing. In 2000, a television series called Concrete Wave launched. The magazine was first based in Toronto. It is headquartered in Thornhill, Ontario.

A 6-page preview issue of Concrete Wave Magazine appeared in the publication International Longboarder (vol. 3 no. 3, spring 2002). International Longboarder was co-published by Brooke along with Tom Browne. It ceased publication in 2002.

Concrete Wave's mandate is to inject roots and variety into skateboarding. Features have included profiles of some of the world's greatest skate photographers and interviews with some of the sports pioneers and legends. The magazine covers the entire range of skateboarding: pools, pipes, ditches, longboarding, speedboarding, slalom, freestyle and of course, street.

In July 2018, the magazine was sold and Michael left the world of skateboard magazine publishing. Concrete Wave produced a few issues and was then sold to another group. Michael decided to return to publishing via Billy James of Shred Shack. In late fall, Billy began work on www.concretewaves.com and soon after, Michael decided that he wanted to collaborate with the revamped website.
