= Transworld Skateboarding =

American international skateboarding magazine

- Former Editor-in-Chief: Jaime Owens
- Categories: Sports magazine
- Frequency: 12 monthly issues and 1 special issue
- Total circulation: 87,308 (March 2013)
- Founded: May 1983
- Final issue: 2019
- Company: The Arena Group
- Country: United States
- Based in: Carlsbad, California, U.S.
- Language: English
- Website: www.skateboarding.com
- ISSN: 0748-7401

Transworld Skateboarding (TWS) is an international magazine on skateboarding that was based in Carlsbad, California, United States. The publication also ran an accompanying website and video production company. In February 2019, the publishers of Transworld magazine, The Enthusiast Network, were purchased by American Media, Inc. In March 2019, the print edition of Transworld magazine was discontinued. It continues as a digital brand.

A satellite edition, Transworld Skateboarding Japan, is published in Japan.

== History ==
=== Early years ===
Transworld Skateboarding was founded in 1983 to rival Thrasher magazine with a slogan of "skate and create" as opposed to "skate and destroy". It was intended as a more accessible alternative to Thrasher Magazine. For example, a December 1982 Thrasher article, "Skate and Destroy", written by C. R. Stecyk III under the pen name "Lowboy", was criticized. A February 1983 advertisement for Independent Trucks featured a topless female model with the brand's decals displayed on her breasts.

The public release of Transworld Skateboarding occurred under the ownership of Peggy Cozens and Larry Balma, owner of the Tracker Trucks brand. Initially, the magazine's editorial teams were known collectively as the "United Skate Front", and Balma later spoke of the magazine’s beginnings as a reaction to Thrasher, explaining in a 2003 Union-Tribune interview: "They were pretty harsh, sex and drugs and using four-letter words and all that and in the early '80s, the sport started growing and [Thrasher] wasn't the best magazine for young kids".

The first issue of TWS contained the article "Skate and Create". Its author, Peggy Cozens, noted, "I have become increasingly concerned about a new skate attitude being pushed on skaters: Skate and Destroy". She highlighted the positive and creative side of skating. The stance of the new magazine remained positive, to the extent that even Thrasher owner Fausto Vitello wrote, "They were about Skate and Create; we were about Skate and Destroy."

The magazine recruited graphic designer David Carson into the position of art director in 1984, and he remained with TWS until 1988; he imbued the magazine with a distinctive look. Between 1984 and 1988, the magazine featured the photographic work of J. Grant Brittain and Spike Jonze, and editorial contributions from professional skateboarders such as Lance Mountain, Tony Hawk, Neil Blender, Steve Berra, Marty 'Jinx' Jimenez, Garry Scott Davis and Mark Gonzales.

=== Time Warner ownership ===
In 1997, the magazine was sold for US$475 million to the Times Mirror in 2000.

Internal tensions between magazine staff and AOL Time Warner started after a new publishers with no understanding of the company culture were sent to manage the publications at the Carlsbad office. Slowly the company started firing long-serving employees and replacing them with new employees that fit their undefined corporate vision. The culmination of this was when internal tensions prompted the resignation of several key founding editorial members, such as J. Grant Britain, Dave Swift, and Atiba Jefferson—journalists who later launched The Skateboard Mag publication that was first published in April 2004. Jefferson, whose seminal mentor was Brittain, revealed in May 2012:

"So, in 2004, we were all working at Transworld with Dave Swift (photographer), Grant ... Brittain. I think I'd gotten to the point—you've done everything you kinda could. And, with that magazine being bought and sold that many times, and being corporate-owned, a lot of things had changed. Even when I started working at Transworld, it was just owned by the Balma's; it was independently owned. It was just different, it wasn't the same. There was a lot of things that became very corporate about it. And that was just-it is so hard to do with skating. There were so many things we couldn't justify. So we decided to break off and start out own magazine, The Skateboard Mag, in 2004."

Jefferson's view was reinforced seven years earlier in an interview that Brittain participated in with the Union-Tribune, whereby Jefferson's mentor stated, "We did not like the whole corporate deal, not knowing what was in every issue ad-wise. It wasn't about skateboarding anymore."

=== Bonnier Group ownership ===
June 2009 cover featuring Nick Dompierre

On September 12, 2006, Time Warner announced the sale of Time4 Media, a company that consisted of a portfolio of eighteen print magazines that included the Transworld group of titles. The rationale for the sale was that Time Warner sought "to focus our energy, resources and investment on our biggest and most profitable brands". The eighteen Time4 Media properties were eventually sold for over US$200 million on January 25, 2007 to the Bonnier Group—a 200-year-old Swedish media and entertainment company with a net income of approximately US$20 million, an annual revenue of US$350 million, and businesses in twenty countries. The deal was finalized by March 1, 2007, and an internal memo from Time4 Media president Tom Beusse was published on the Internet, in which he stated:

Bonnier has adopted a decentralized approach in managing their 150 businesses because they believe in the potential and ability of individuals, and they are notorious for being very good to employees. They also understand vertical media brands and the value of their connection with passionate enthusiast audiences. Bonnier's acquisition of our businesses is excellent recognition of that value, as well as the quality of our brands and talent of our staff. Together we have the unique opportunity to build a new multi-platform media company on an incredible foundation.

Since the departure of Dave Swift as editor of Transworld Skateboarding in 2004, the magazine and website is overseen by Skin Phillips (Editor-in-Chief) and is the largest skateboarding magazine in the world. As of March 2013, the magazine's editors are listed as Oliver Barton (Bartok), Blair Alley, Ben Kelly, Kevin Duffel, Joey Muellner (Shigeo), Chris Thiesson and Dave Chami. The magazine's headquarters in Carlsbad also houses an indoor skate park that is a "5,000-square-foot 'plaza' complete with simulated brick banks and real concrete ledges", and it is estimated that over 2,500 people attend the facility every year. In early 2013, the Bonnier International Magazines website revealed that a full page, four-color advertisement in the magazine can be purchased for US$22,271.

In the second decade of the 21st century, the magazine launched Transworld.tv, an online video platform that is described by the publication as a service that "offers compelling and relevant selections of action sports clips, trailers, webisodes, and live webcasts through a single website viewable across multiple screens including mobile devices, personal computers, e-readers, and traditional television screens".

The publication's 2013 media kit cites a readership total of 619,886, a monthly print circulation of 87,308, and a total annual brand audience total of 13,092,000. As of March 2, 2013, the magazine's Facebook fan page had received 448,102 "likes" and the 2013 media kit claimed 298,000 monthly website visitors, 58,000 Twitter followers, 82,000 Instagram followers, 75,000 viewers of its "online on-demand video platform" Transworld.tv and 20,394 subscribers to its YouTube channel.

=== GrindMedia acquisition ===
An official announcement was released on May 20, 2013, to mark the acquisition of Transworld media by the GrindMedia company that is owned by Source Interlink. The Bonnier Corporation's decision occurred after it divested of the Mountain Group, which includes Ski, Skiing and Warren Miller titles and its Parenting Group. At the time of the acquisition, GrindMedia owned the forty-nine-year-old title Skateboarder Magazine, which was transformed into a free digital publication, with a bimonthly print replica, in April 2013.

Former Skateboarder Editor-In-Chief Jaime Owens was announced as the new Editor-In-Chief of Transworld Skateboarding in October 2013. Owens got the job as it became open around the time that the production of Skateboarder magazine ceased in August 2012 and explained what Transworld Skateboarding means to him in an October 29, 2013, interview with the magazine: "TWS‘ hallmark has always been amazing photography of the biggest names in skateboarding. Growing up with Transworld meant I was always seeing the best skateboarding being done by the best skaters shot by the best photographers. That documentation of skateboarding is unsurpassed."

GrindMedia’s parent company, Source Interlink Media (SIM), published a press release in May 2014 to announce a rebranding to the new name: "The Enthusiast Network" (TEN). As part of the rebranding process, the GrindMedia umbrella brand became the "TEN: Action/Outdoor" brand and remained a part of the new TEN brand. The press release stated that TEN sought to transform into a "Web-Led, Socially Amplified Media Model" and TEN Chief Executive Officer Scott Dickey—who was hired in February 2014—explained: "It is not up to us to decide how our consumers choose to interact with our brands ... Our job is to provide them with the content they want, where they want it, and when they want it. Our business model needs to reflect this new reality."

=== a360media acquisition ===
In February 2019, Transworld Skateboarding was acquired by a360media, formerly American Media.

=== The Arena Group acquisition ===
In 2022, The Arena Group acquired Transworld Skateboarding.

== Charity work and causes ==
The Bonnier Corporation associated the magazine with charities such as the Tony Hawk Foundation, Texas Skate Jam, Make-A-Wish, and Elemental Awareness, identifying the publication as a regular contributor to such programs.

In October 2012, the magazine featured and promoted the "Free Fabes" campaign, organized by the DGK skateboard company, on its website. The campaign sought to raise legal funds for former professional skateboarder, Fabian Alomar, who was arrested and detained earlier in the year for a non-violent drug possession charge.

== Videography ==
The magazine has released a series of skateboarding videos (in chronological order):

- Uno (1996)
- 4 Wheel Drive (1996)
- Greatest Hits (1997)
- Cinematographer (1997)
- Interface (1997)
- The Sixth Sense (1998)
- Transmission 7 (1999)
- Feedback (1999)
- The Reason (1999)
- Modus Operandi (2000)
- i.e. (2000)
- Sight Unseen (2001)
- In Bloom (2002)
- Chomp On This (2002)
- Free Your Mind (2003)
- Are You Alright? (2003)
- Subtleties (2004)
- First Love (2005)
- A Time To Shine (2006)
- Let's Do This! (2007)
- And Now (2008)
- Right Foot Forward (2009)
- Hallelujah (2010)
- Not Another Transworld Video (2011)
- The Cinematographer Project (2012)
- Perpetual Motion (2013)
- Outliers (2014)
- Substance (2016)
- Riddles in Mathematics (2017)
- The Cinematographer Project: Worldview (2017)
- Duets (2018)

Transworld Skateboarding has also released a number of additional video projects:

- The Dreams of Children (1994) – unofficial
- Starting Point 1 (1997)
- Starting Point 2 (1998)
- Starting Point 3 (2001)
- Anthology (2000)
- Videoradio (2002)
- Show Me the Way (2004)
- Skate & Create (2008)
- The Australia China Experience (2008)
