= Street art =

Visual art in public spaces

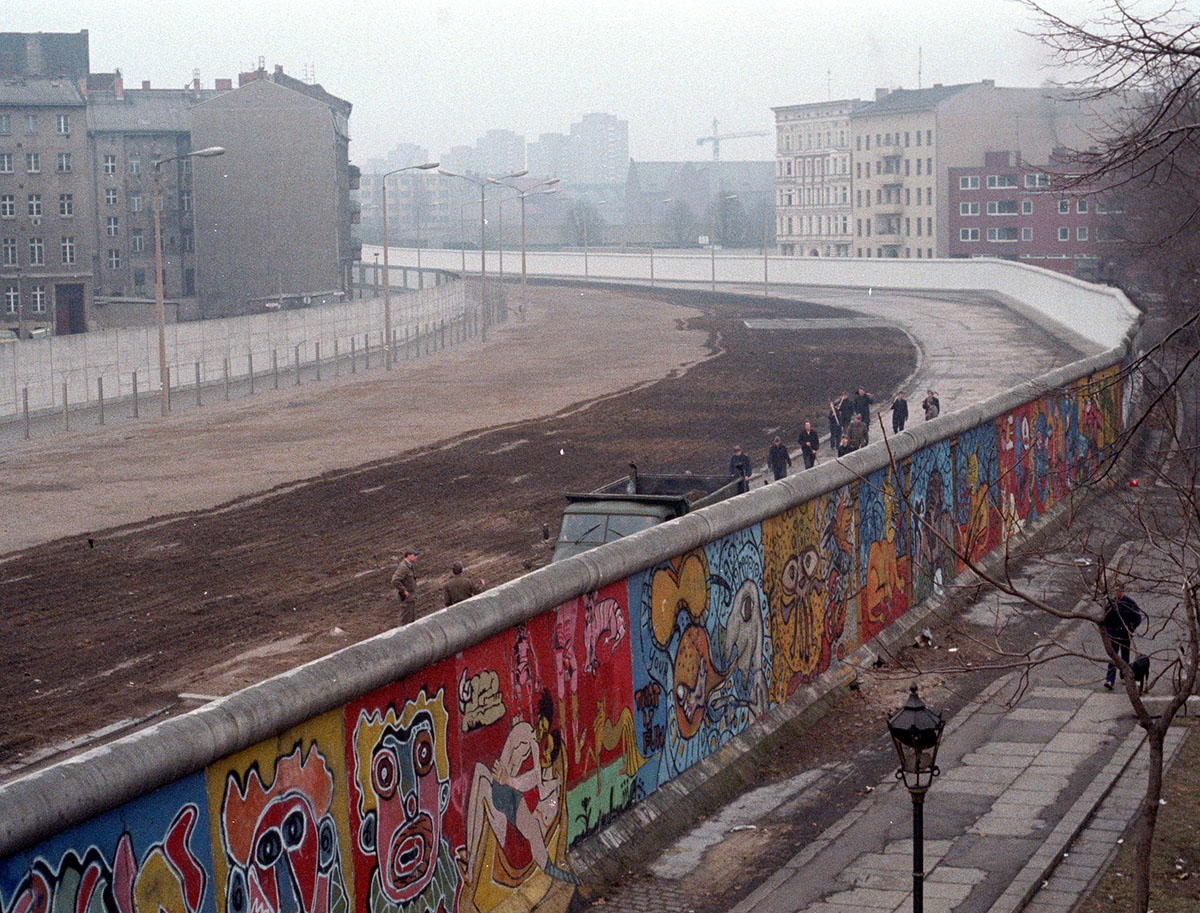
- Germany's Berlin Wall (shown 1986) was a target of artists during its existence (1961–1989).
- Years active: 1980s–present
- Major figures: Banksy; John Fekner; Keith Haring
- Influences: Graffiti

Street art is visual art created in public locations for public visibility. It has been associated with the terms "independent art", "post-graffiti", "neo-graffiti" and guerrilla art.

Street art has evolved from the early forms of defiant graffiti into a more commercial form of art, as one of the main differences now lies in the messaging. Street art is often meant to provoke thought rather than rejection among the general audience by making its purpose more evident than that of graffiti. The issue of permission has also come to the heart of street art, as graffiti is usually done illegally, whereas street art can nowadays be the product of an agreement or even sometimes a commission. However, it remains different from traditional art exposed in public spaces by its explicit use of said space in the conception phase.

== Forms and Mediums ==
Street art is a form of artwork that is displayed in public on surrounding buildings, on streets, trains and other publicly viewed surfaces. Many instances come in the form of guerrilla art, which is intended to make a personal statement about the society that the artist lives within. The work has moved from the beginnings of graffiti and vandalism to new modes where artists work to bring messages, or just beauty, to an audience.

Some artists may use "smart vandalism" as a way to raise awareness of social and political issues, whereas other artists use urban space as an opportunity to display personal artwork. Artists may also appreciate the challenges and risks that are associated with installing illicit artwork in public places. A common motive is that creating art in a format that utilizes public space allows artists who may otherwise feel disenfranchised to reach a much broader audience than other styles or galleries would allow.

Whereas traditional graffiti artists have primarily used spray paint to produce their work, "street art" can encompass other media, such as LED art, mosaic tiling, stencil graffiti, sticker art, reverse graffiti, "Lock On" sculptures, wheatpasting, woodblocking, yarn bombing and rock balancing.

New media forms such as video projections onto large city buildings are an increasingly popular tool for street artists—and the availability of cheap computer hardware and software allows such artwork to become competitive with corporate advertisements. Artists are thus able to create art from their personal computers for free, which competes with companies' profits.

== History ==
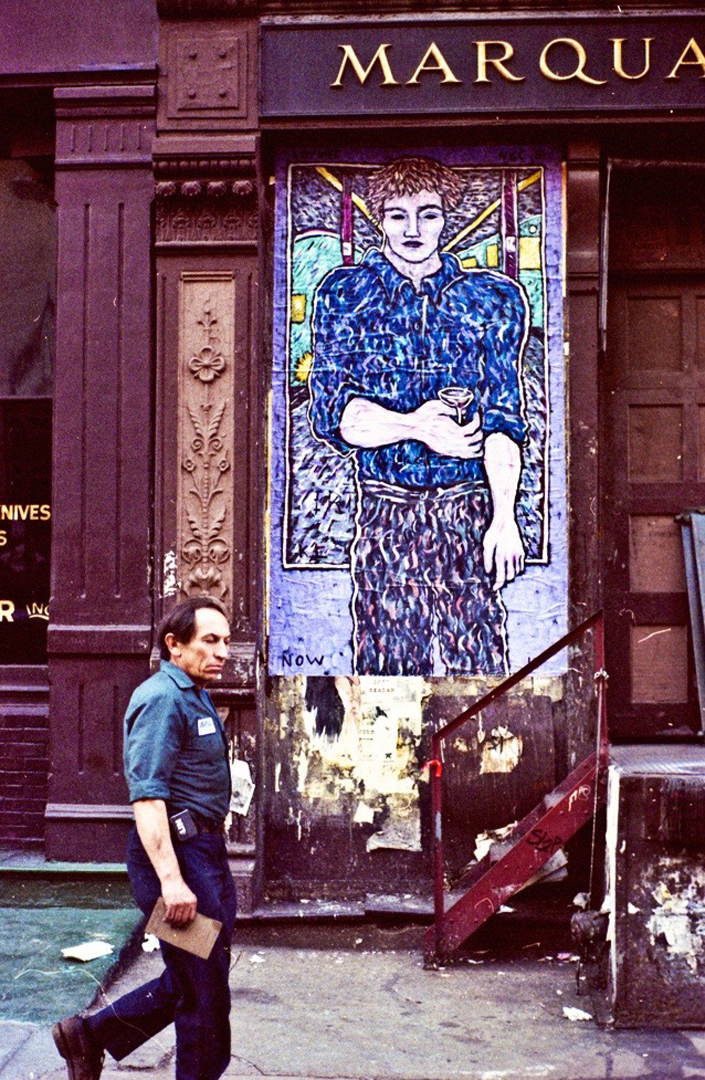
Street art by Kevin Larmee, SoHo, New York City (1985)

Slogans of protest and political or social commentary graffiti on walls are the precursor to modern graffiti and street art, and continue as one aspect of the genre. Street art in the form of text or simple iconic graphics of corporate icons can become well-known yet enigmatic symbols of an area or an era. Some credit the "Kilroy Was Here" graffiti of the World War II era as one such early example: a simple line-drawing of a long-nosed man peering from behind a ledge. Author Charles Panati indirectly touched upon the general appeal of street art in his description of the "Kilroy" graffiti as "outrageous not for what it said, but where it turned up".

Much of what is now considered modern street art has well-documented origins in New York City's graffiti boom and in Paris in the 1960s. Among its early practitioners was Gérard Złotykamień (known as Zloty), who began producing spray-painted works in public spaces in 1963. Influenced by Yves Klein, Zloty's work addressed themes including the Holocaust, war, and human suffering. In the 1970s, Blek le Rat introduced the use of pre-cut stencils.

The art form peaked in the 1980s with the spray-painted full-car subway train murals, especially in the Bronx. A shift occurred from text-based works of early in the decade to visually conceptual street art such as Hambleton's shadow figures. This period coincides with Keith Haring's subway advertisement subversions and Jean-Michel Basquiat's SAMO tags. What is now recognized as "street art" had yet to become a realistic career consideration, and offshoots such as stencil graffiti were in their infancy. Wheatpasted street poster art used to promote bands and the clubs where they performed evolved into actual artwork or copy-art and became a common sight during the 1980s in cities worldwide. The group working collectively as AVANT was also active in New York during this period. Punk rock music's subversive ideologies were also instrumental to street art's evolution as an art form during the 1980s. Some of the anti-museum mentality can be attributed to the ideology of Marinetti who in 1909 wrote the "Manifesto of Futurism" with a quote that reads, "we will destroy all the museums."

=== Early iconic works ===
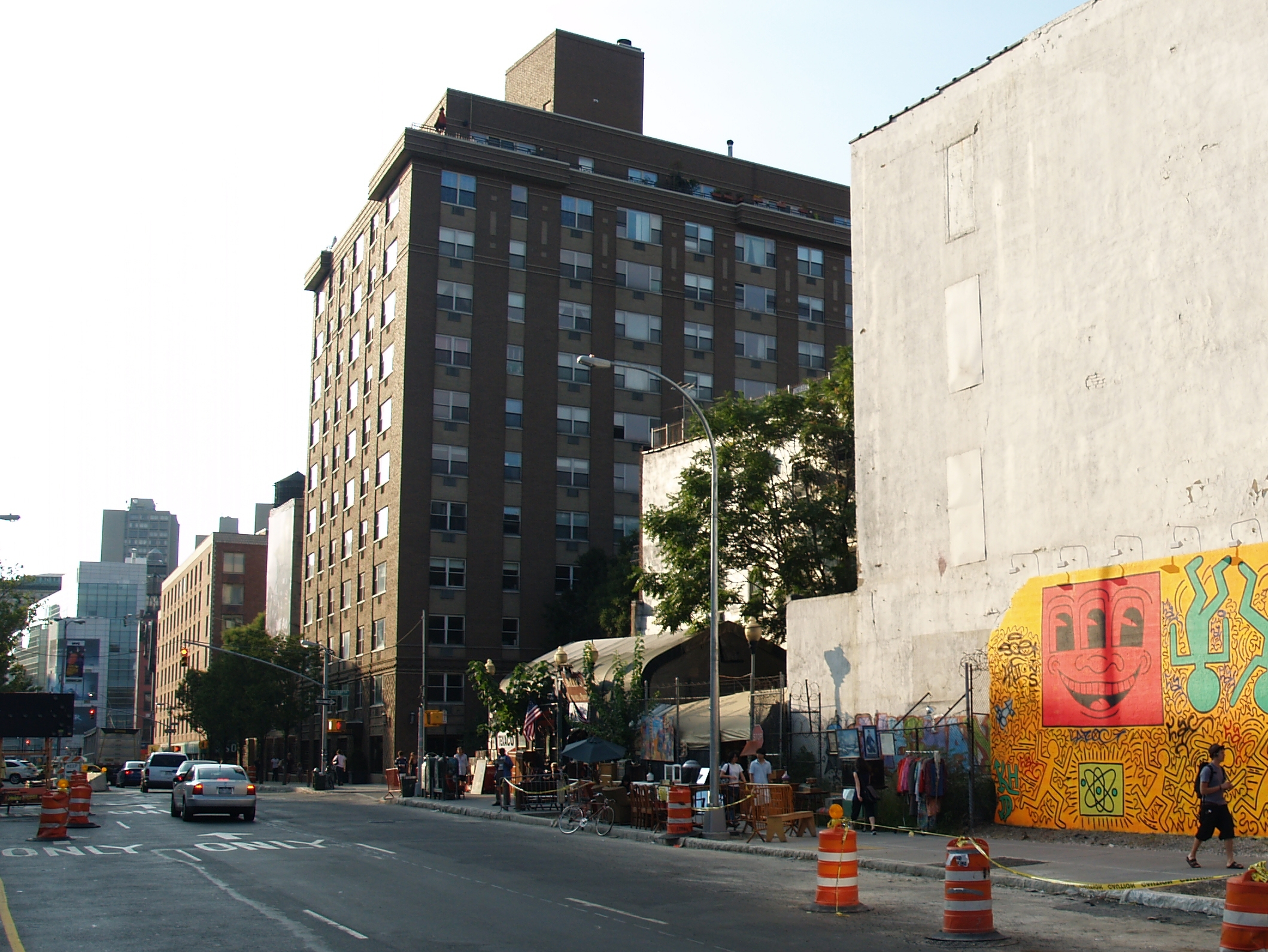
The 2010 recreation of Keith Haring's original 1982 mural; New York City's Bowery Mural wall at Houston Street and the Bowery

The northwest wall of the intersection at Houston Street and the Bowery in New York City has been a target of artists since the 1970s. The site, now sometimes referred to as the Bowery Mural, originated as a derelict wall that graffiti artists used freely. Keith Haring once commandeered the wall for his use in 1982. After Haring, a stream of well-known street artists followed, until the wall had gradually taken on prestigious status. By 2008, the wall became privately managed and made available to artists by commission or invitation only.

A series of murals by René Moncada began appearing on the streets of SoHo in the late 1970s emblazoned with the words I AM THE BEST ARTIST. René has described the murals as a thumb in the nose to the art community he felt he had helped pioneer but by which he later felt ignored by. Recognized as an early act of "art provocation", they were a topic of conversation and debate at the time; related legal conflicts raised discussion about intellectual property, artist's rights and the First Amendment. The ubiquitous murals also became a popular backdrop to photographs taken by tourists and art students, as well as for advertising layouts and Hollywood films. IATBA murals were often defaced, only to be repainted by René.

Franco the Great, also known as the "Picasso of Harlem" is another world famous street artist internationally known also for his New Art form. There were riots in the streets when Martin Luther King Jr. was assassinated in 1968. Harlem business owners retaliated by installing drab-looking metal gates on their store fronts. Franco decided to turn a negative into a positive by developing a new art form on the steel gates in 1978. He has painted over 200 gates from the west to the east side of 125th street on Sundays since then, when stores are closed. 125th Street in Harlem is unofficially known as "Franco's Blvd" because of his magnificent paintings on the metal business gates.

== Commercial crossover ==
Some street artists have earned international attention for their work and have made a full transition from street art into the mainstream art world—some while continuing to produce art on the streets. Keith Haring was among the earliest wave of street artists in the 1980s to do so. Traditional graffiti and street art motifs have also increasingly been incorporated into mainstream advertising, with many instances of artists contracted to work as graphic designers for corporations. Graffiti artist Haze has provided font and graphic designs for music acts such as the Beastie Boys and Public Enemy. Shepard Fairey's street posters of then-presidential candidate Barack Obama were reworked by a special commission for use in the presidential campaign. A version of the artwork also appeared on the cover of Time magazine. It is also not uncommon for street artists to start their own merchandising lines.

Street art has received artistic recognition with the high-profile status of Banksy and other artists. This has led street art to become one of the 'sights to see' in many European cities. Some artists now provide tours of local street art and share their knowledge, explaining the ideas behind many works, the reasons for tagging, and the messages portrayed in a lot of graffiti work. Berlin, London, Paris, Hamburg and other cities all have street art tours running all year round. In London there are over ten different graffiti tours available for tourists. Many of these organizations, such as Alternative London, ParisStreetArt, AlternativeBerlin, work with local artists so visitors can get a more authentic experience and not just a rehearsed script.

Many of these guides are painters, fine-art graduates and other creative professionals that have found the medium of street art as a way to exhibit their work. With this commercial angle, they can let people into the world of street art and give them more of an understanding of where it comes from. It has been argued that this growing popularity of street art has made it a factor in gentrification.

=== Legality and ethics ===
Street art can have legal problems. The parties involved can include the artist, the city or municipal government, the intended recipient and the owner of the structure or the medium where the work was displayed. One example is a case in 2014 in Bristol, England, which illustrates the legal, moral and ethical questions that can occur. The Mobile Lovers by Banksy was painted on plywood on a public doorway, then cut out by a citizen who in turn was going to sell the piece to garner funds for a boys' club. The city government in turn confiscated the artwork and placed it in a museum. Banksy, hearing of the conundrum, then bequeathed it to the original citizen, thinking his intentions were genuine. In this case, as in others, the controversy of ownership and public property, as well as the issues of trespassing and vandalism, are issues to be resolved legally.

=== Copyright ===
In 2005, Banksy's Wall and Piece included in the publisher notes that "Copyright is for losers ©™".

Under United States law, works of street art should be able to find copyright protection as long as they are legally installed and can fulfill two additional conditions: originality in the work, and that it is fixed in a tangible medium. This copyright would then survive for the lifespan of the artist plus 70 years. In case there is a collaboration between two artists, both would hold joint ownership in the copyright. Street artists also hold moral rights in their work, independent of economic rights arising from copyright. These include the right to integrity and the right to attribution. Recently, street art has started to gain recognition among art critics, and some major companies have found themselves in trouble for using this art without permission for advertising. In such a case, H&M, a fast fashion retailer used street art by Jason "Revok" Williams in an advertisement series. In response to Williams' 'Cease and Desist' notice, however, H&M filed a lawsuit, alleging that since the work is a "product of criminal conduct", it cannot be protected by copyright. This view has been taken earlier too, in the cases of Villa v. Pearson Education and Moschino and Jeremy Tierney. In all three cases, before the judge could make a ruling on the issue of the illegality of the art, settlements were reached. These companies typically settle out of court to avoid costly, time-consuming litigation.

When it comes to the question of the destruction of street art, the United States has applied the Visual Artists Right Act (VARA) to introduce moral rights into copyright law. In English v. BFC & R East 11th Street LLC and Pollara v. Seymour, it was held that this Act was inapplicable to works of art placed illicitly. A distinction was also made between the removable and non-removable works, indicating that if a work can be removed trivially, it cannot be destroyed, irrespective of its legal status. Another important factor considered by the court in the latter case was whether the artwork was "of a recognized stature".

In a case where a group of artists was awarded $6.7 million, the judge held that the art was not made without permission of the owner of the building, and that an important factor was that the demolition was done ahead of the intended date, indicating willful thought.

== Street art, guerrilla art and graffiti ==
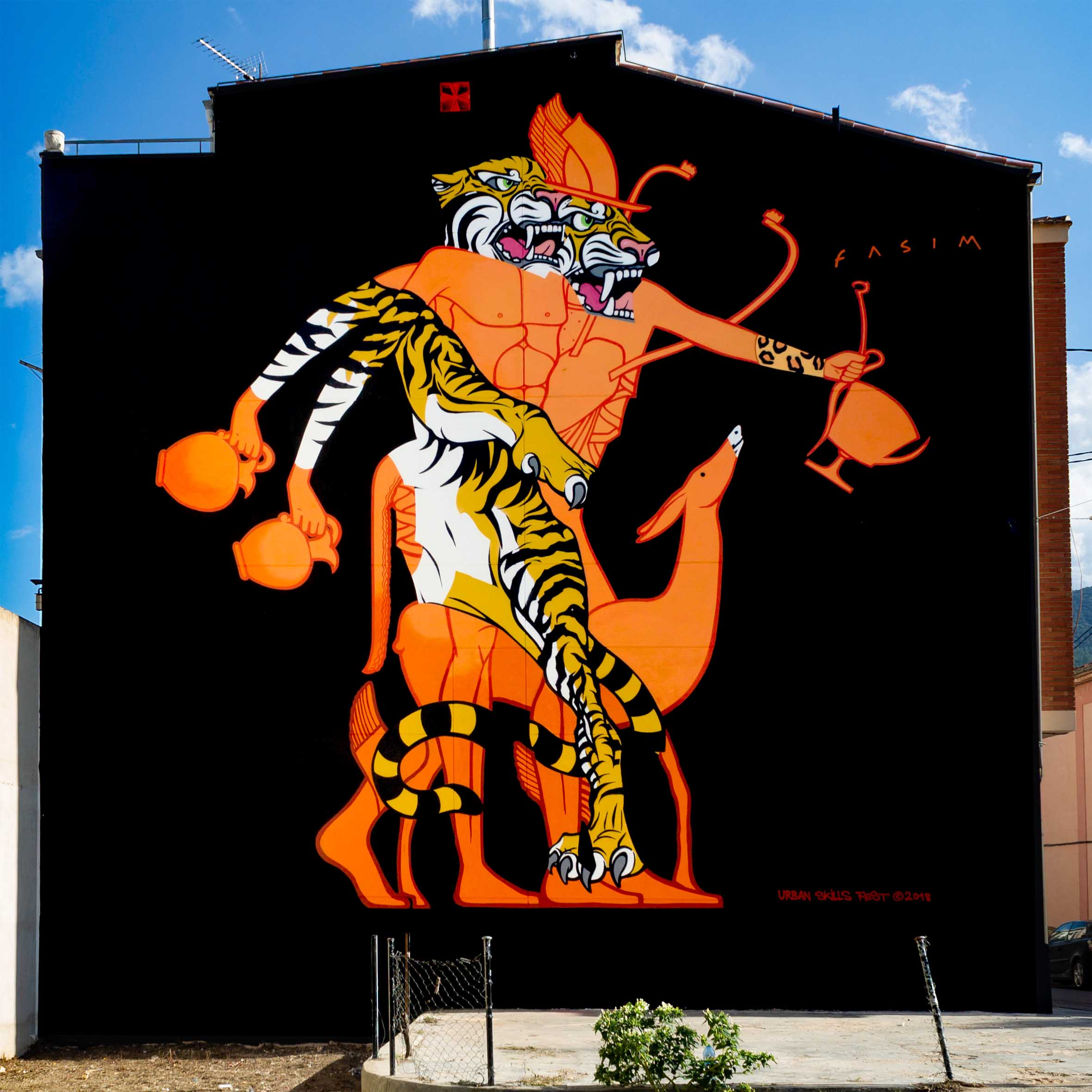
Guerrilla art, a humanist mural by Fasim in Alcoi, 2018, Valencia, Spain

Graffiti typically consists of stylized words that are meant to represent a group or community covertly, in plain sight. Street art usually includes images, illustrations, or symbols that are meant to convey a message, but the messages in street art are usually meant to be understandable to all. However, both graffiti artists and street artists often have similar ambitions for popularity, recognition, or the public display of their personal thoughts, feelings and passions.

The term street art is described in many different ways, one of which is the term "guerrilla art." Both terms describe these public works that are placed with meaning and intent. They can be done anonymously for works that are created to confront taboo issues that will result in a backlash, or under the name of a well-known artist. With any terminology, these works of art are created as a primary way to express the artist's thoughts on many topics and issues.

As with graffiti, an initial trait or feature of street art is that it is often created on or in a public area without or against the permission of the owner. A main distinction between the two comes in the second trait of street art or guerrilla art, where it is made to represent and display a purposefully uncompliant act that is meant to challenge its surrounding environment. This challenge can be granular, focusing on issues within the community or broadly sweeping, addressing global issues on a public stage.

This is how the term "guerrilla art" was associated with this type of work and behavior. The word ties back to guerrilla warfare in history where attacks are made wildly, without control and with no rules of engagement. This type of warfare was dramatically different from the previously formal and traditional fighting that went on in wars normally. When used in the context of street art, the term guerilla art is meant to give a nod to the artist's uncontrolled, unexpected and often unnamed attack on societal structure or norms.

Some have asked if it is sufficient to place art in the street to make street art; Nicholas Riggle looks more critically at the border between graffiti and street art and states that "an artwork is street art if—and only if—its material use of the street is internal to its meaning". The street is not a blank canvas for the street artist. It has a character, a use, a history, a texture, a shape. Street art, as well as broader urban art, transforms the street or opens the dialogue. Justin Armstrong states graffiti is identified as an aesthetic occupation of spaces, whereas urban street art repurposes them.

=== Guerilla sculpture ===
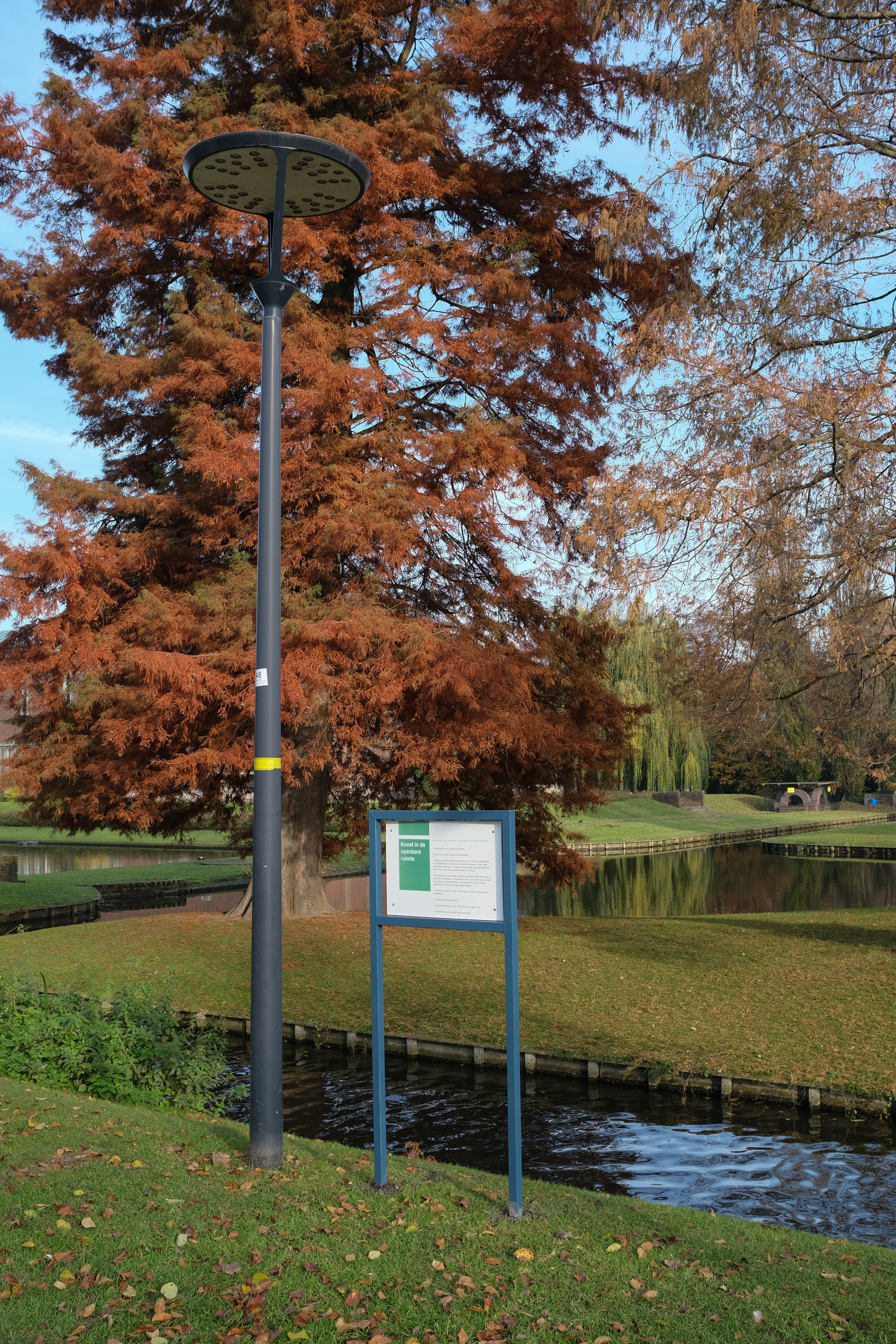
Framed Rules is an art installation in public space by Koen van Rijn, placed on 21 November 2019, in the Museumpark in Rotterdam, Netherlands.

Guerilla sculpture is the placement of sculptures in street settings without official approval; it developed from street art in England in the late 20th century. In addition to the nontraditional setting of the works of art involved, there are also many different techniques used in the creation of this artwork. The artists tend to work illegally and in secrecy to create and place these works in the dark of night, cloaked in mystery regarding their origins and creators. The sculptures are used to express the artist's views and to reach an audience that would not otherwise be reached through more traditional methods of displaying one's work to the public. In performing these acts of artistic expression, they are not working to gain acceptance or love of the people that they reach, but at times may even anger those who view their work.

An example is the overnight appearance of an unsanctioned sculpture of Edward Snowden onto a column in Fort Greene Park in New York City. In other cases, the sculptures integrate two-dimensional backdrops with a three-dimensional component, such as one by Banksy titled Spy Booth (2014). The backdrop was painted on a wall in Cheltenham, England and featured Cold-War spy characters adorned in trench coats and fedoras, with spy accoutrements, microphones and reel-to-reel tape decks. These characters appeared to be tapping into a broken telephone booth.

On 15 July 2020, a month after the statue of Edward Colston was pulled down during Black Lives Matter protests in Bristol, artist Marc Quinn used the empty plinth to display his sculpture A Surge of Power (Jen Reid). The life-sized piece, created from black resin and steel, was inspired by a picture of protester Jen Reid, raising her fist during the Bristol protest that subsequently went viral and caught the attention of Quinn. The statue was removed by Bristol City Council on 16 July 2020.

In Latin America, especially Mexico, the term antimonumento has developed as the equivalent to political guerilla sculpture, or simply, an illegal installation of a politically themed sculpture. They are used to denounce the inaction of the state and reclaim public space. Normally an antimonumento is installed during a demonstration and, as Márcio Seligmann-Silva writes, "corresponds to a desire to actively recall the (painful) past." Some of the issues commemorated are disappearances, massacres, migration, and the killing of women.

== Public acceptance ==
Although street art may be ubiquitous around the world, the popularity of its artistic expression is relatively recent. Street art has undergone a major transformation in public opinion to become socially accepted and respected in some public places. Even with this degree of acceptance, defacing private or public property with any and all message, whether it is considered art or not, is still widely illegal.

In the beginning, graffiti was the only form of street art that there was and it was widely considered to be a delinquent act of territorial marking and crude messaging. Initially, there were very clear divisions between the work of a street artist and the act of tagging a public or private property, but in recent years where the artists are treading the line between the two, this line has become increasingly blurred. Those who truly appreciate the work of famed street artists or street works of art are in acceptance of the fact that this art would not be the same without the medium being the street. The works are subject to whatever change or destruction may come because since they are created on public or private surfaces which are neither owned by the artist or permitted to be worked on by the property owners. This acceptance of the potential impermanence of the works of art and the public placement of the uncondoned works are what contribute to the meaning of the piece and therefore, what helps the growth of street art popularity. In the 21st century, a number of American cities began installing poetry into sidewalk cement, sometimes holding public contests to choose new poems.

Perhaps contrary to earlier anti-museum and ticket sale sentiments of some street artists; a dedicated exhibition to Street Art under the title 'Urban' opened in Peterborough Museum, United Kingdom, on 11 December 2021. With tickets for the preview evening selling at £5 GDP and subsequent entry being charged at £8 per person. The exhibition has been promoted as being of 'major national [UK] importance' and celebrating artists such as Banksy, Damien Hirst, My Dog Sighs, the Connor Brothers, Pure Evil and Blek le Rat. While street art and sculpture has been on display at Bristol Museum since a Banksy 'takeover' in 2009. Dedicated Banksy Museums, featuring life-sized recreations of his street murals, have also opened in cities including New York, Paris, Amsterdam, Barcelona, and Krakow.

== Beautification movement ==
Given the various benefits and sometimes high return on investment street art provides businesses, schools, neighborhoods and cities with a movement as a tool to create safer, brighter, more colorful and inspiring communities, a trend which has recently been more widely recognized. Organizations like Beautify Earth have pioneered cities to leverage these benefits to create widespread beauty where it would be otherwise empty or dilapidated public wall space.

A The Washington Post article written by Sydney Page has stated that according to a safety study produced by Bloomberg Philanthropies in partnership with the consulting firm Sam Schwartzentitled "Asphalt Art Safety Study", crosswalks painted with murals have been found to significantly reduce the frequency of accidents occurring at such sites.

== By region ==
Street art scenes vary widely across regions, shaped by local cultural traditions, legal frameworks, and urban development patterns. The following sections document notable concentrations and characteristics of street art worldwide.

=== North America ===
==== Canada ====
In Montreal, with over 80 murals and counting since the foundation of MURAL Festival in 2013, the annual street art festival contributed to creating Le Plateau-Mont-Royal as an epicenter for urban arts. Villeray, Downtown Montreal Le Sud-Ouest, Hochelaga-Maisonneuve, and multiple art districts also continue to broaden the street art circuit within the Island of Montreal. The Under Pressure annual graffiti festival, the largest of its kind in North America, celebrated its 25th anniversary in 2021.

Toronto has a significant graffiti scene.

Calgary, while historically having a smaller graffiti street art scene, recently started the Beltline Urban Mural Project (BUMP) with artists from all over the world creating large murals in the city center.

==== United States ====
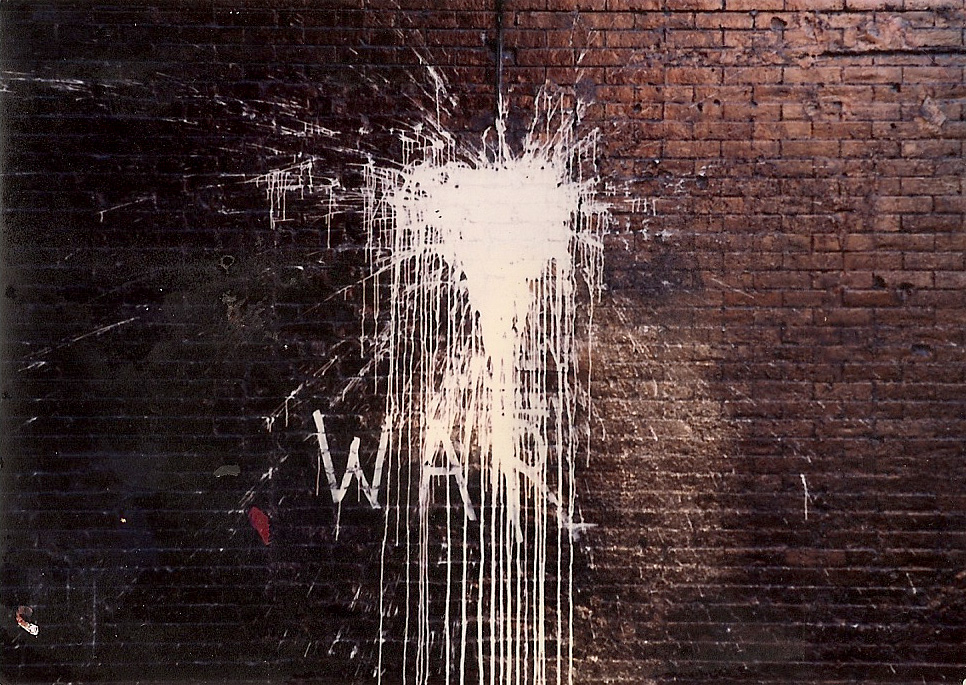
Early Street art by Jacek Tylicki, Lower East Side, New York City (1982)

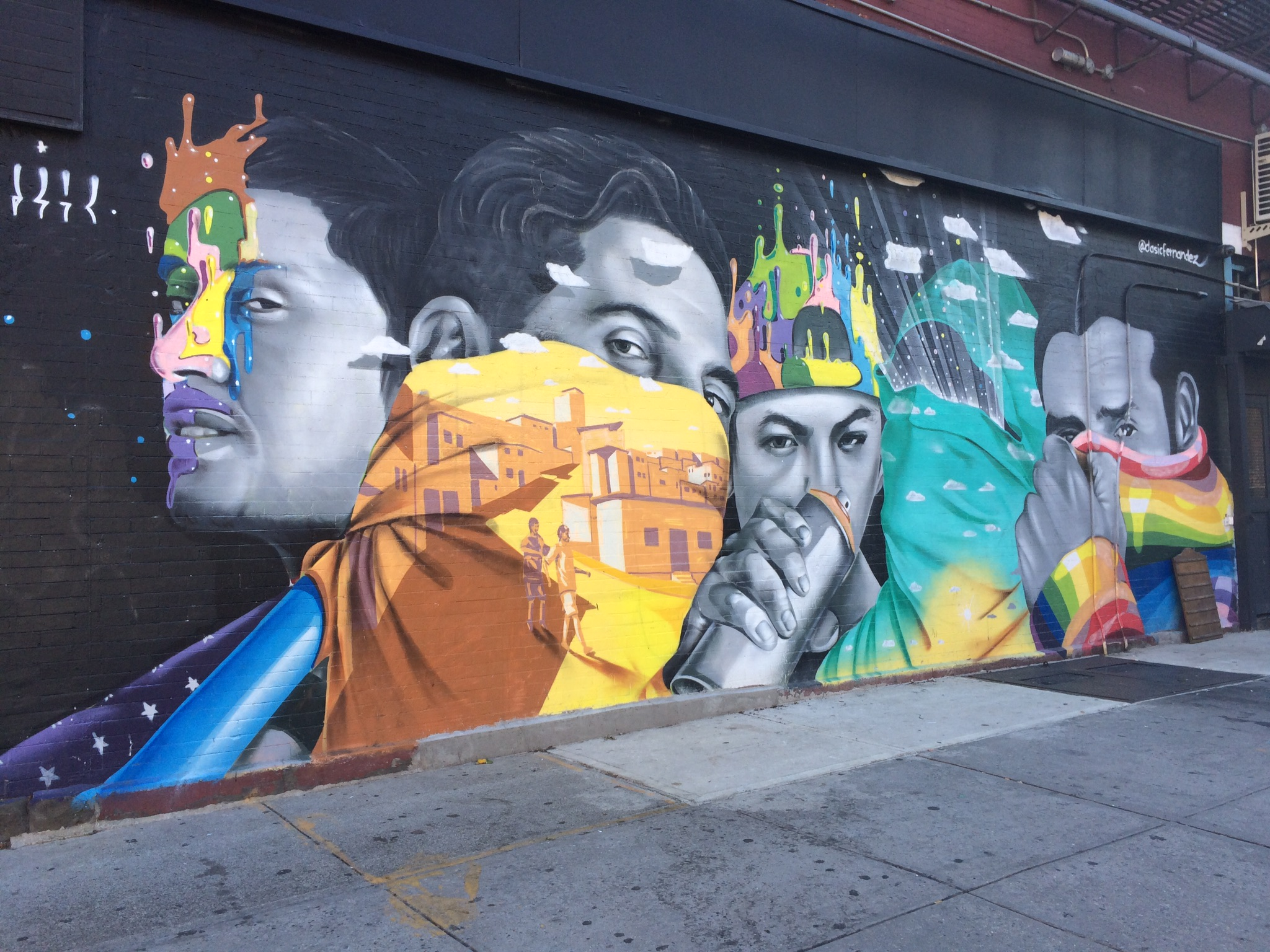
Street Art in Manhattan, New York City, 15 September 2017

New York City attracts artists from around the world. In Manhattan, "post-graffiti" street art grew in the 1980s from the then largely vacant neighborhoods of SoHo the Lower East Side and parts of East Village. The Chelsea art district became another locale, with area galleries also hosting formal exhibitions of street artist's work. In Brooklyn, the Williamsburg and Dumbo neighborhoods—especially near the waterfront—are recognized street art sites. New York City's unofficial mural district is in Bushwick, Brooklyn, with curatorial gatekeeping by a non-profit organization called The Bushwick Collective.

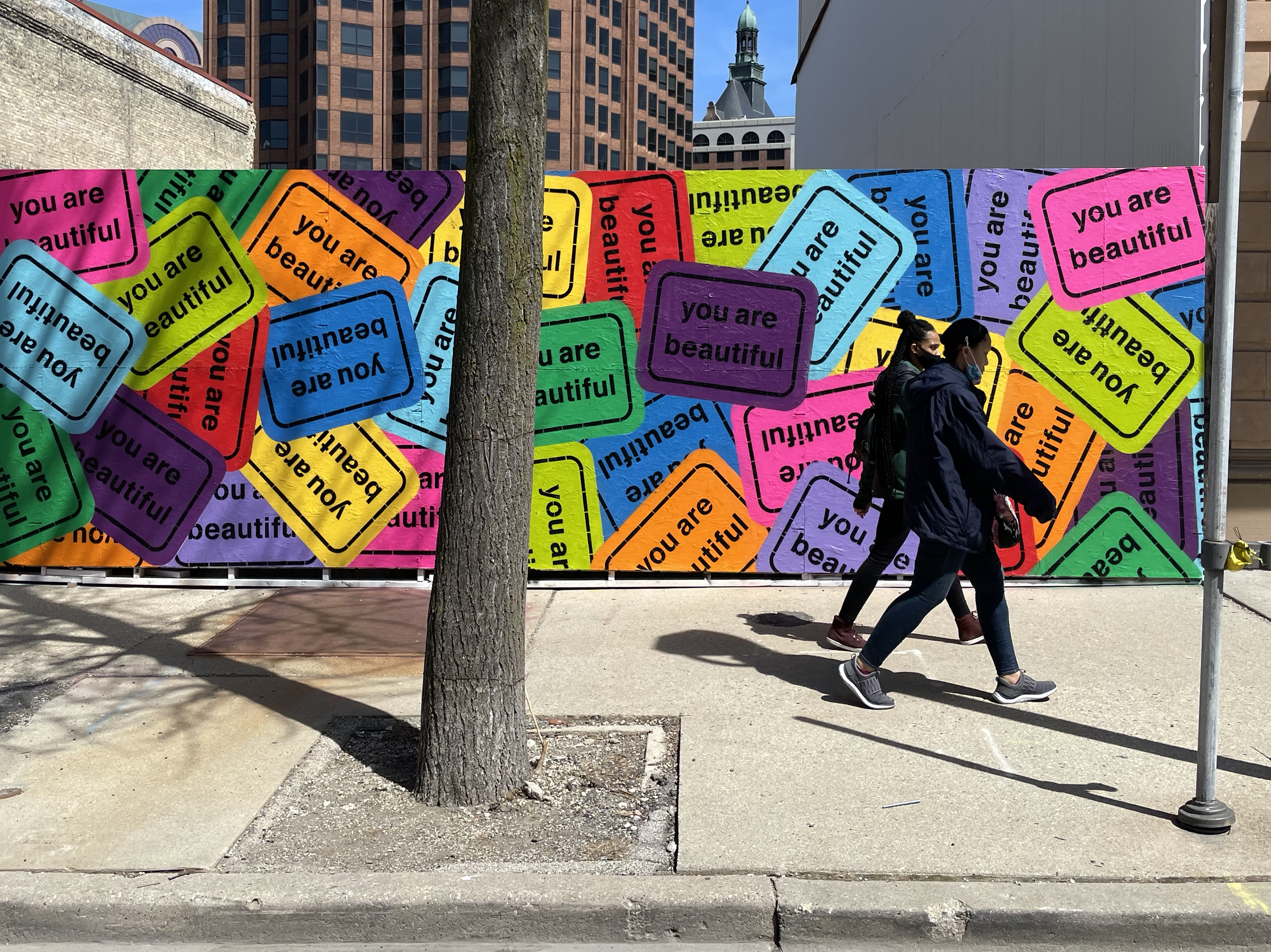
A vibrant mural of colorful "You Are Beautiful" stickers brightens a city street as pedestrians walk by.

Chicago has many forms of street art emerging but some of the most popular artists that can be seen everywhere in Chicago is Matthew Hoffman and his You Are Beautiful project, Sentrock, Jc Rivera (The Bear Champ), and Hebru Brantley.

Programs in the Pennsylvania cities of Philadelphia and Pittsburgh provide funding to agencies who employ street artists to decorate city walls. The Mural Arts Program established in 1984 has helped Philadelphia earn praise as the "City of Murals". The project was initiated to encourage graffiti artists toward a more constructive use of their talents. Murals backed by The Sprout Fund in Pittsburgh were named the "Best Public Art" by the Pittsburgh City Paper in 2006.

Street art in Atlanta centers on the Old Fourth Ward and Reynoldstown neighborhoods, the Krog Street Tunnel, and along the 22-mile BeltLine railway corridor which circles the inner city. Atlanta established a Graffiti Task Force in 2011. Although the city selected a number of murals that would not be targeted by the task force, the selection process overlooked street art of the popular Krug Street Tunnel site. Art created in conjunction with the Living Walls street art conference, which Atlanta hosts annually, was spared. Some actions were taken by the unit, including arrests of artists deemed vandals, caused community opposition; some considered the city's efforts as "misdirected" or "futile". After being sued by a group of artists in 2017 the city of Atlanta agreed not to enforce an ordinance requiring artists to obtain city approval for murals on private property. Images and locations of over 200 works of Atlanta street art can be found on the Atlanta Street Art Map.

Sarasota, Florida, hosts an annual street art event, the Sarasota Chalk Festival, founded in 2007. An independent offshoot known as Going Vertical sponsors works by street artists, but some have been removed as controversial.

Los Angeles's Arts District is known for its high concentration street murals. The neighborhood of Hollywood and streets such as Sunset Boulevard, La Brea, Beverly Boulevard, La Cienega, and Melrose Avenue are among other key locations. LAB ART Los Angeles, opened in 2011, devotes its 6,500 square feet of gallery space to street art. Artwork by locals such as Alec Monopoly, Annie Preece, Smear and Morley are among the collection.

San Francisco's Mission District, center of the Mission School movement, has densely packed street art along Mission Street, and along both Clarion and Balmy Alleys. Streets of Hayes Valley, SoMa, Bayview-Hunters Point and the Tenderloin have also become known for street art.

San Diego's East Village, Little Italy, North Park, and South Park neighborhoods contain street artwork of VHILS, Shepard Fairey, Tavar Zawacki a.k.a. ABOVE, Space Invader, Os Gêmeos, among others. Murals by various Mexican artists can be seen at Chicano Park in the Barrio Logan neighborhood. Chicano Park, which was a part of people's land takeover in 1970, celebrated its 52nd anniversary in 2022. The more than 80 murals depict many aspects of Latino culture from lowrider culture to Aztec warriors. The intent for the art provided people enough positive evidence to respect it and leave it be. These spaces were then seen as a place of activism and pride, rather than vandalism. Since the COVID-19 pandemic, Ground Floor Murals has created works that recognize the multicultural communities of San Diego, including Mexican singer Vicente Fernández, players from the San Diego Padres, and important local community members. Their first mural was of Padres' legend, Tony Gwynn in City Heights.

Richmond, Virginia has over 100 murals created by artists, many of whom are alumni of Virginia Commonwealth University's School of the Arts or current students there. Some of the murals are privately commissioned by individuals and businesses, some are created by solo street artists, and some are collaborative group fund-raising projects.

Denver street artists have been busy brightening (and enlightening) the urban landscape for decades by making canvases of the city's alleyways, building exteriors, warehouses, garage doors and storefronts. The city of Denver has a whole area called the River North Art District (RiNo) that is dedicated to the work of local creative artists. Most artists in the RiNo district are commissioned by the local business owners who want to give their buildings colorful imagery.

==== Mexico ====
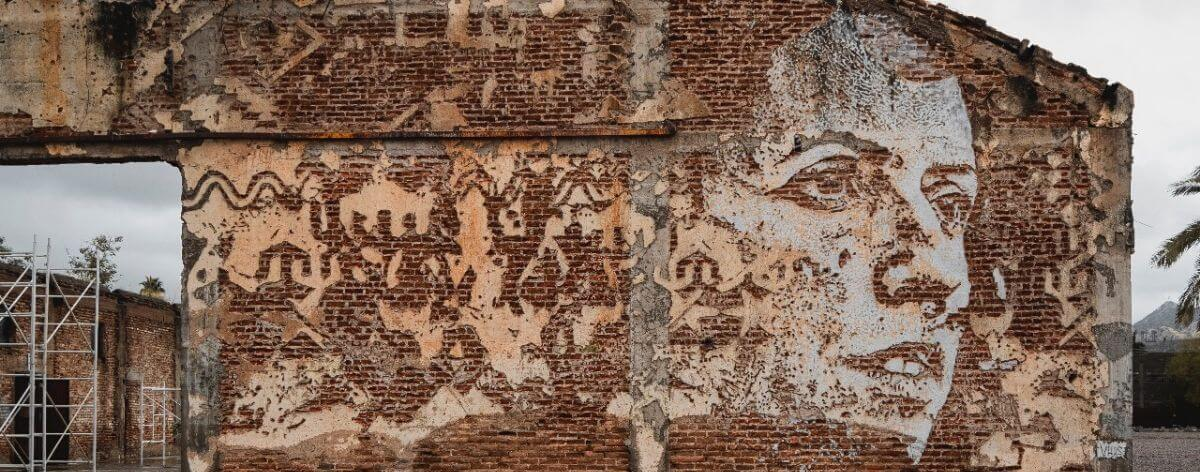
Mural by Vhils at Parque La Ruina (Hermosillo, Sonora), produced for ACC Global Series

The manifestations of street art in Mexico began in the late 80s in Mexico City, in multifamily buildings in the north of the city, and in the subway. Since then, urban art and graffiti have become an essential part of the cultural identity of the city halls of the metropolis. Currently, various associations and groups are dedicated to creating and finding spaces for urban art in Mexico City and throughout the country. Several artists, both emerging and established, both national and foreign, have brought their art to the country. In Oaxaca, political printmaking collectives including ASARO, Colectivo Subterráneos, and Lapiztola produce wheat-pasted prints addressing indigenous rights and social justice issues.

There are also media, such as All City Canvas, specialized in the dissemination of urban art in Mexico, Latin America, and the rest of the world. Even in 2012, All City Canvas was the first organization to create a street art festival in Mexico, seeking to join international efforts and showcase urban art for a week in Mexico City. In recent years, they have produced several murals in collaboration with talented artists such as Vhils, It's a Living and Bier in Brood, as part of the All City Canvas Global Series in some cities in Mexico and the United States. The objective of the initiative is to create an impact on society through a large-scale piece of art. In that way, it has been possible to create a universal language around this artistic manifestation.

=== South America ===
Buenos Aires has developed a reputation for its large scale murals and artworks in many subway stations and public spaces. The first graffiti artists started painting in the street in the Argentine capital in the mid-1990s after visiting other countries in Europe and South America. One of the first recognized street artists in Argentina is Alfredo Segatori, nicknamed 'Pelado', who began painting in 1994 and holds the record for the largest mural in Argentina measuring more than 2000 square meters.

An abundance of buildings slated for demolition provides blank canvases to a multitude of artists, and the authorities cannot keep up with removing artists' output. "Population density" and "urban anxiety" are common motifs expressed by "Grafiteiros" in their street art and pichação, rune-like black graffiti, said to convey feelings of class conflict.

Influential Brazilian street artists include Claudio Ethos, Os Gêmeos, Vitche, Onesto, and Herbert Baglione.

Bogotá has many walls dedicated to street art, a popular movement in Colombia, including: Avenida El Dorado (TransMilenio), Avenida Suba and the historical neighborhood La Candelaria. The Distrito graffiti (graffiti district) is a dedicated place with gubernatorial curatory with more than 600 pieces of Colombian and international artists.

Caracas at the beginning this art the works had a more cultural air, much of the first street arts in the country were related to politics. Messages of disagreement or support for the leaders of the moment predominated. Over the years, street art in Venezuela has evolved. The works with political accents continued to star in the streets of the country, but culture became part of the arena.

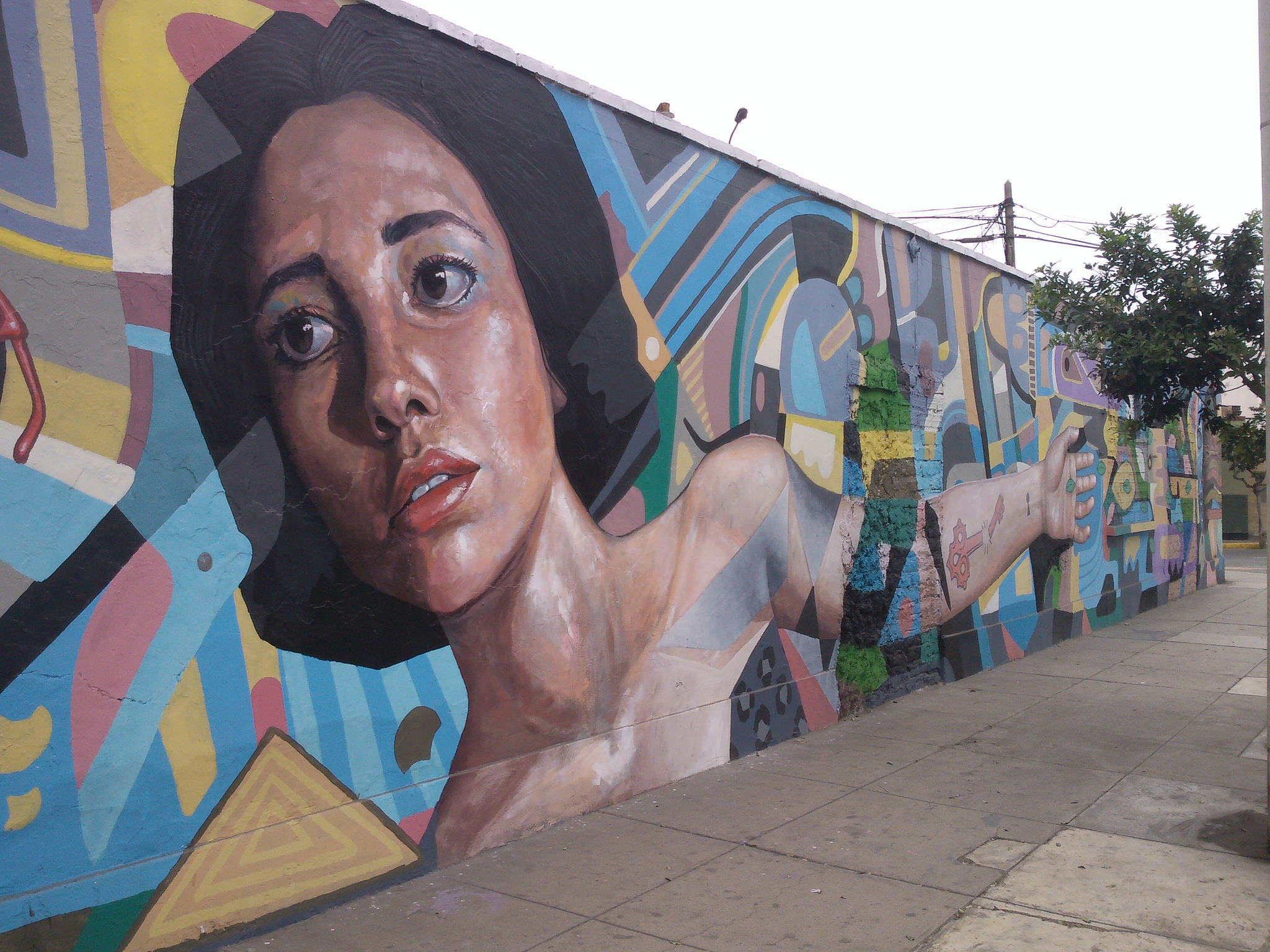
Graffiti in Lima, Peru (2014)

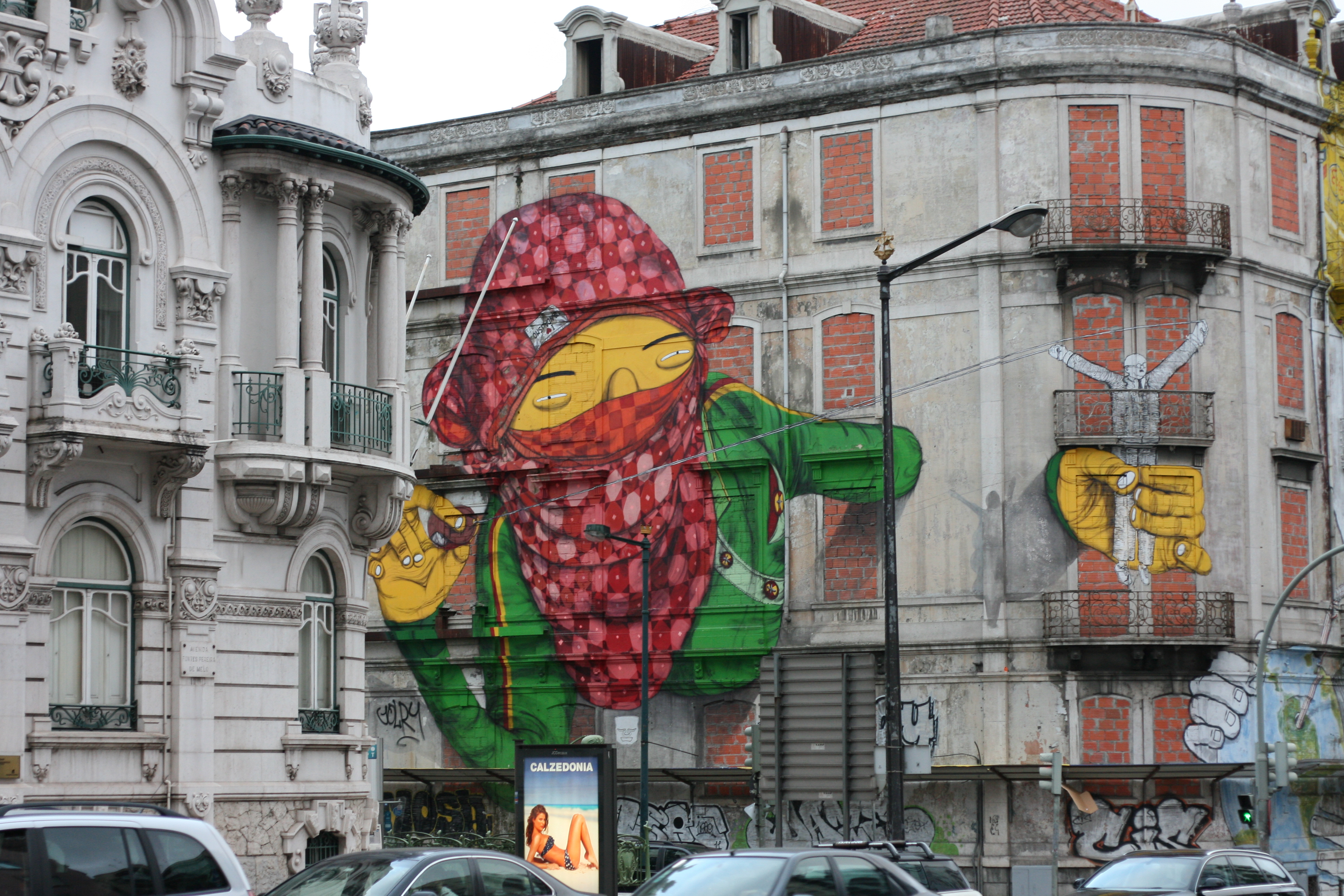
Work of Brazilian artists Os Gêmeos, in Lisbon, Portugal (2011)

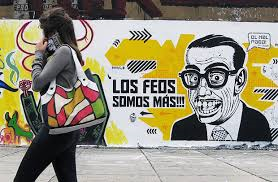
Graffiti in Bogotá, Colombia (S. XXI)

Mural Boulevard Olímpico, Rio de Janeiro Brazil by Leon Keer.

=== Europe ===
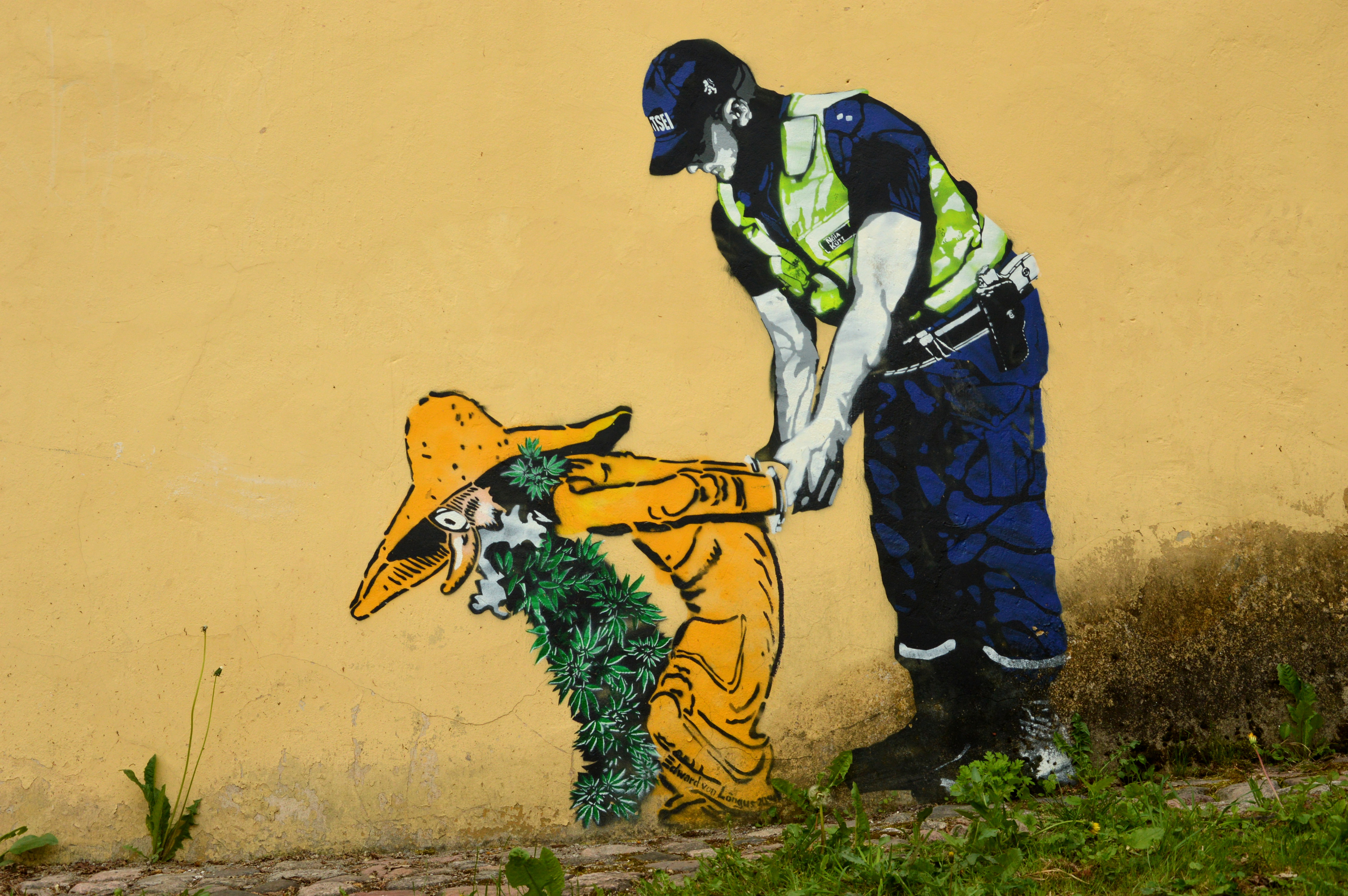
Social-critical work about the war on drugs by Edward von Lõngus in Tartu, Estonia

In London, Dulwich Outdoor Gallery, in collaboration with Street Art London, is an outdoor "gallery" of street art in Dulwich, southeast London, with works based on traditional paintings in Dulwich Picture Gallery.

Bristol has a street art scene, due in part to the success of street artist Banksy.

Ostend, Belgium, hosts an international street art festival. The Crystal Ship invites street artists every year since 2016 to produce art inspired by its people, landscape, and heritage. Liège-based street artist Thierry Jaspart has gained recognition since 2017 for his Je suis partout and J'EXISTE. poster campaigns around Europe and the rest of the world.

Paris has a street art scene that is home to artists such as Space Invader, Jef Aérosol, SP 38 and Zevs. Some connect the origins of street art in France to Lettrism of the 1940s and Situationist slogans painted on the walls of Paris starting in the late 1950s. Nouveau realists of the 1960s, including Jacques de la Villeglé, Yves Klein and Arman interacted with public spaces but, like pop art, kept the traditional studio-gallery relationship. In the 1970s, the site-specific work of Daniel Buren appeared in the Paris subway. Blek le Rat and the Figuration Libre movement became active in the 1980s. The 13 arrondissement promotes street art through the Street Art 13 project. This includes two frescos by D*Face from London: "Love will not tear us apart" and "Turncoat". Between October 2014 and March 2015, Fondation EDF hosted Jérôme Catz's exhibition "#STREET ART, L'INNOVATION AU CŒUR D'UN MOUVEMENT", which featured new technologies integrated with pieces by artists including Shepard Fairey, JR, Zevz, and Mark Jenkins. The exhibition became the second most-visited exhibit at EDF since it opened in 1990. Street artist John Hamon's work primarily involves projecting or pasting a poster of his photograph above his name on buildings and monuments across the city.

Street art on the Berlin Wall was continuous during the time Germany was divided, but street art in Berlin continued after reunification and is home to street artists such as Thierry Noir Tavar Zawacki a.k.a. ABOVE and SP 38. In 2016, StreetArtNews initiated an urban artwork in the name of Urban Nation Berlin, in which several artists participated.

The second largest city in Estonia, Tartu, has been called the Estonian street art capital. While Tallinn has been against graffiti, Tartu hosts the street art festival Stencibility.

The street art scene in Greece has been active since the late 1980s but gained momentum in Athens leading up to the country's 2011 financial crisis, with a number of artists raising voices of resistance, creating allegorical works and social commentary in the historic city center and Exarhia district. Street art by Bleepsgr, whose work has been categorized as "artivism", appears in neighborhoods such as Psiri.

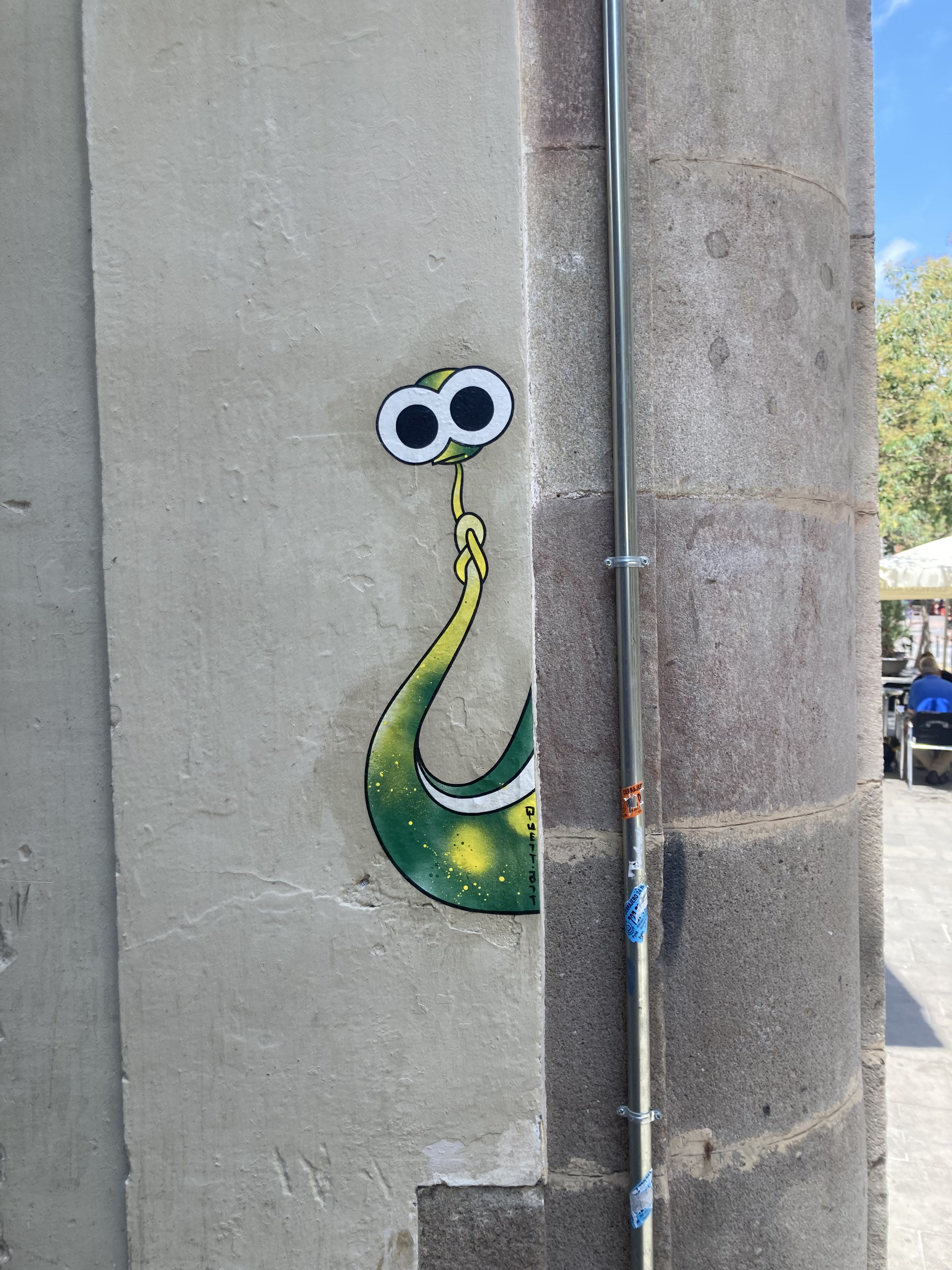
Street art in Barcelona

In Spain, Madrid and Barcelona represent the most graffiti populated cities, while Valencia, Zaragoza and Málaga also have a street art scene.

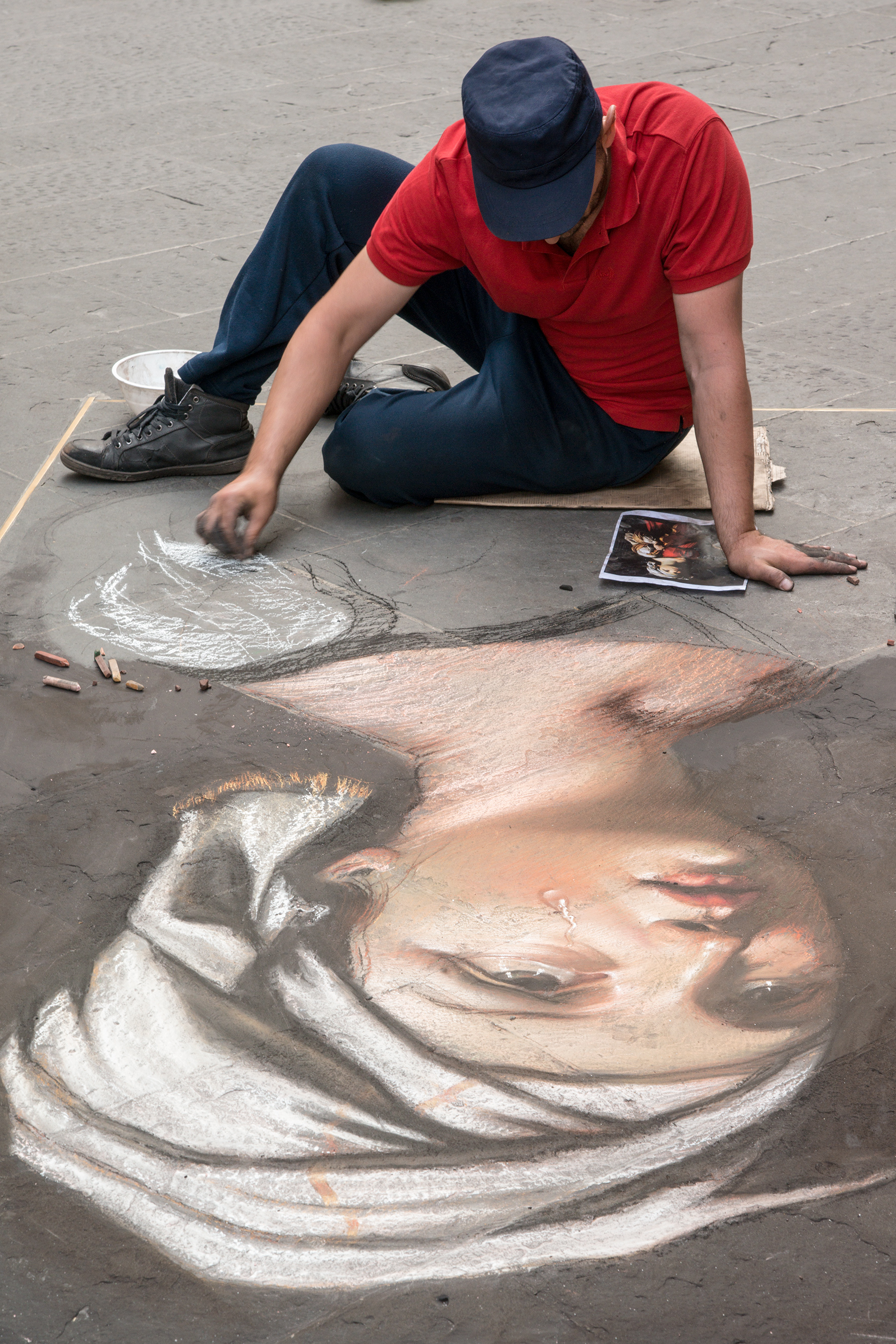
Street artist (chalks) in Florence, Italy

Italy has been active in street art since the end of the 1990s; street artists include BLU, 108, and Sten Lex.

Street art in Amsterdam dates from before the mid-1960s. The counterculture movement named the provos already used the street as a canvas. Member Robert Jasper Grootveld wrote things like "Klaas komt" (English: "Klaas is Coming!") throughout the whole city. At the end of the 1970s, young artists from the punk culture wrote on the decayed city. Well-known artists from this 'No Future-generation' are Dr. Rat and Hugo Kaagman, the stencil art pioneer who made his first stencil back in 1978. Yaki Kornblit brought New York graffiti artists like Blade, Dondi, Futura 2000 and Rammellzee to Amsterdam to exhibit in his gallery in the early 80s. A new generation style writers emerged that was later recorded in the documentary Kroonjuwelen (2006). In the early 1990s, Amsterdam became the epicenter of the graffiti movement, with a focus on its Metro system, bringing writers such as Mickey, Zedz and Yalt to the capital of the Netherlands. Figurative street art became more and more common in the streets around the turn of the century. Morcky, Wayne Horse, The London Police en Laser 3.14 communicated through their work on the street.

The city of Bergen is the street art capital of Norway. British street artist Banksy visited the city in 2000 and inspired many to take their art to the streets. Dolk is among local street artists in Bergen. His art can be seen around the city. Bergen's city council in 2009 chose to preserve one of Dolk's works with protective glass.

In 2011, the city council launched a plan of action for street art from 2011 to 2015 to ensure that "Bergen will lead the fashion for street art as an expression both in Norway and Scandinavia".

The city of Stavanger is host to the annual NuArt Festival, an event dedicated to promoting street art; the festival is one of the oldest curated "street art" festivals in the world. Nuart Plus is an associated industry and academic symposium dedicated to street art. The event takes place each September. Oslo, by contrast, traditionally has a zero tolerance policy against graffiti and street art, but the sanctioned NuArt RAD project is changing that.

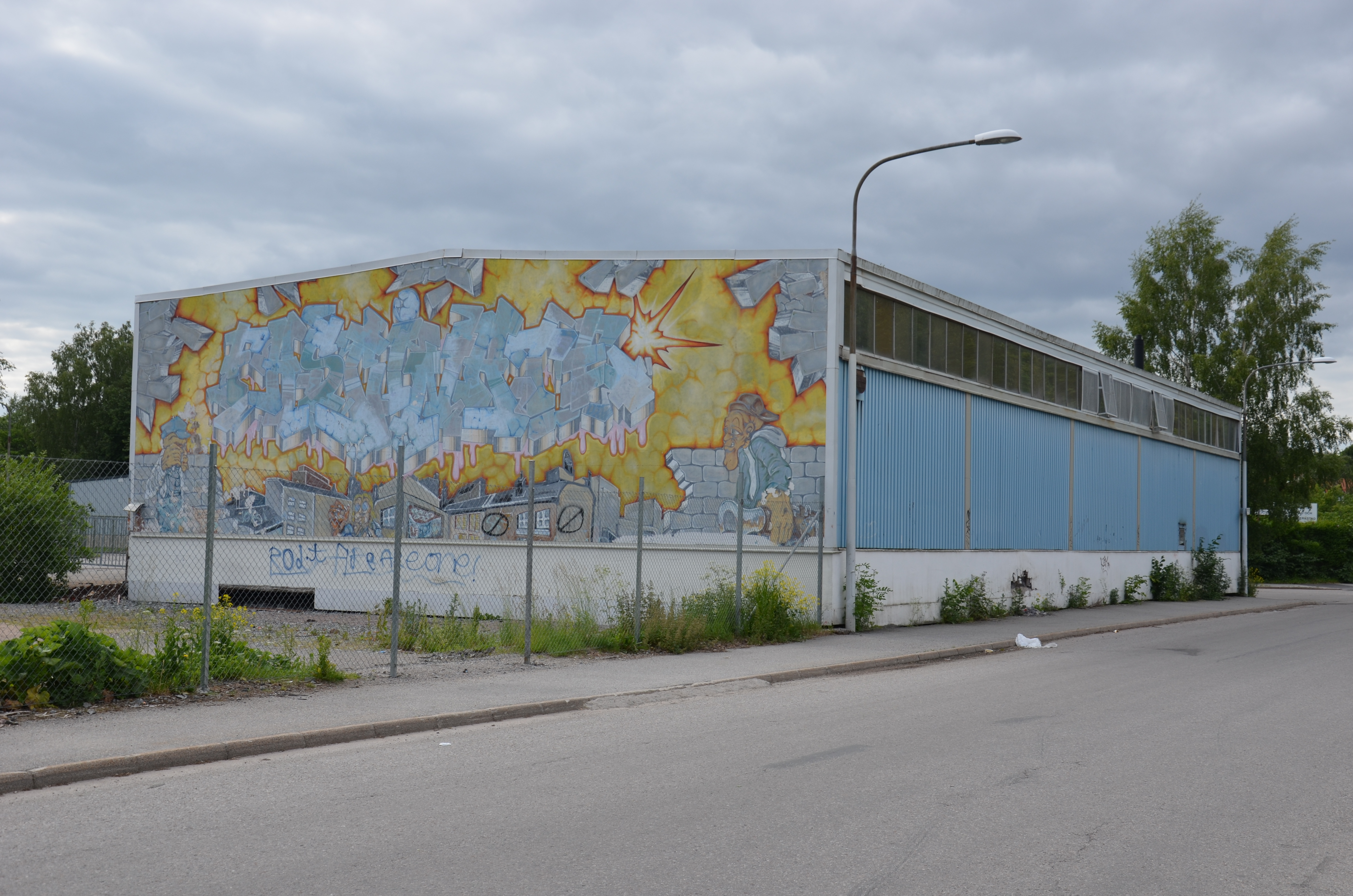
Graffiti painting in Bromsten, Stockholm

Street art came to Sweden in the 1990s and has since become the most popular way to establish art in public space. The 2007 book "Street Art Stockholm", by Benke Carlsson, documents street art in the country's capital.

The street art scene of Finland had its growth spurt from the 1980s onwards until in 1998 the city of Helsinki began a ten-year zero-tolerance policy which made all forms of street art illegal, punishable with high fines, and enforced through private security contractors. The policy ended in 2008, after which legal walls and art collectives have been established.

Wheatpaste and stencil graffiti art in Denmark increased after visits from Faile, Banksy, Ben Eine, and Shepard Fairey between 2002 and 2004, especially in urban areas of Copenhagen such as Nørrebro and Vesterbro. Copenhagen is home of TEJN, the artist credited with introducing the Lock On street art genre.

The street art scene in Switzerland saw the artist Harald Nägeli in the late 1970s. Activity from the nineties on included artists like Toast and NEVERCREW.

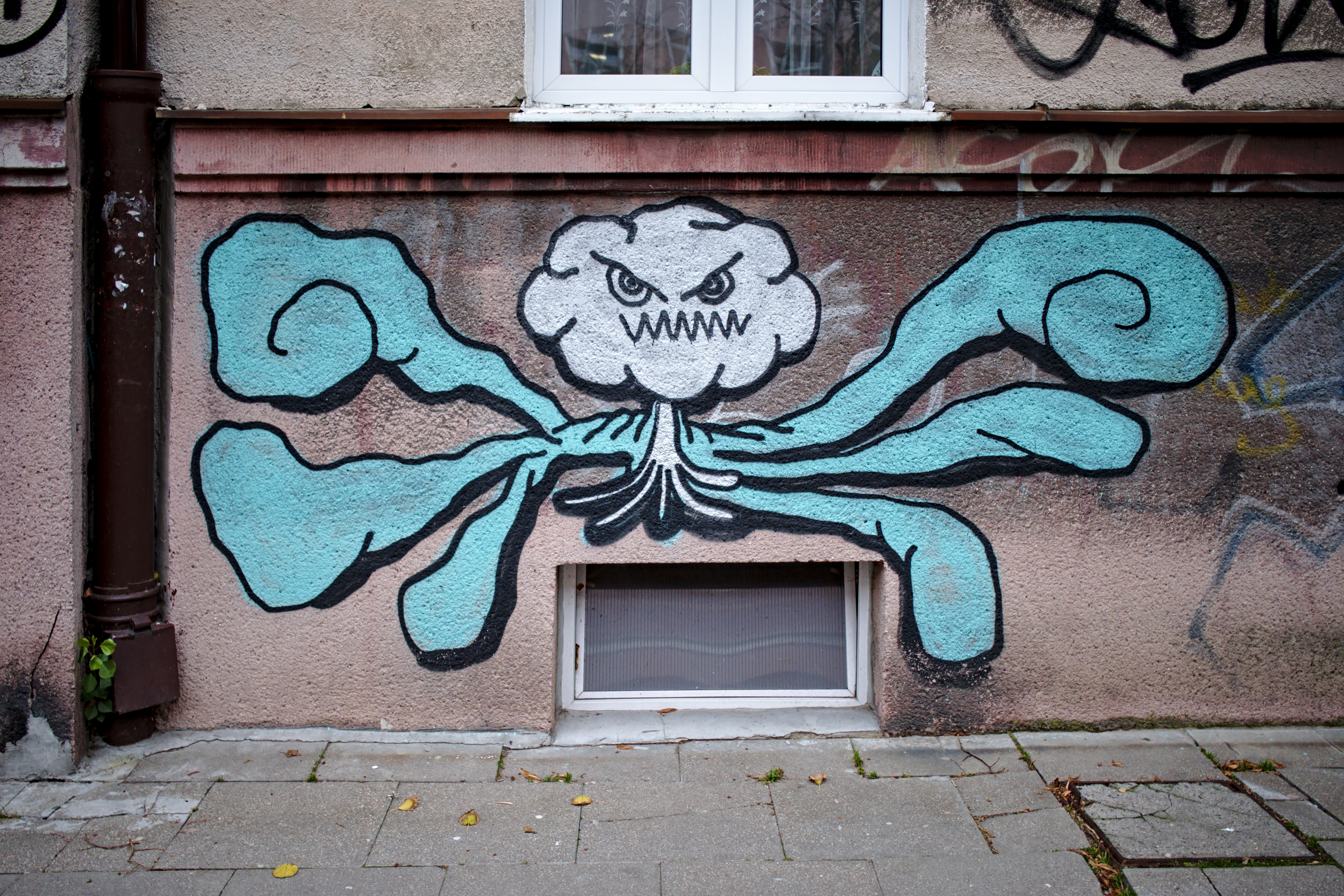
Graffiti art in central Warsaw, Poland, 2016

Since the collapse of communism in 1989, street art became prevalent in Poland throughout the 1990s. Artists like Sainer and Bezt became known for painting huge murals on buildings and walls in the 2010s. In the city of Łódź a permanent city exhibition was financed in 2011, under the patronage of Mayor Hanna Zdanowska, called "Urban Forms Gallery". The exhibition included work from some of Poland's elite street artists as well as globally known artists. Despite being mostly accepted by the public, with authorities occasionally allowing artists licenses to decorate public places, other properties are still illegally targeted by artists. Warsaw and Gdańsk are other Polish cities with a vibrant street art culture.

A monument in Bulgaria depicting Soviet Army soldiers was targeted by anonymous street artists in June 2011. The soldiers of the monument, located in Sofia, were embellished to portray Ronald McDonald, Santa Claus, Superman, and others. The monument existed in that condition for several days before being cleaned. Some citizens were in favor of allowing the embellishments to remain.

Mariupol in Ukraine saw building murals playing a symbolic role in the 2014 and 2022 Russian invasions of Ukraine. In 2018, the Ukrainian artist Sasha Korban painted the mural Milana on a facade of a Mariupol building, showing 3-year-old Milana Abdurashytova, a survivor of a 2015 pro-Russian missile attack, as a symbol of resilience. The mural was destroyed in late 2022 while Mariupol was still occupied by Russian forces. Also in 2022, the Italian artist Jorit painted a mural of a young Australian girl, found in an online search for the word "pigtails", on another building facade in Mariupol, initially stating that the subject was a girl from Donbas who had lived in Mariupol. His inclusion in the mural of a bomb labelled "NATO" in a town that was severely bombed by Russian forces and the relation with Korban's destroyed mural were criticised by media including Il Giornale and the investigative journalism website Valigia Blu.

Moscow became a hub for Russian graffiti artists as well as international visitors in the 2000s. The Street Kit Gallery, opened in 2008, is dedicated to street art and organizes events in galleries, pop-up spaces and on the streets of the city. The 2009 Moscow International Biennale for Young Art included a section for street art. Active artists include Make, RUS, and Kyiv-based Interesni Kazki (also active in Miami and Los Angeles). Britain's BBC network highlighted the artwork of Moscow street artist Pavel 183 in 2012.

The dissolution of the Soviet Union left Georgia with tantalizing urban space for the development of street art. Although it is a relatively new trend in Georgia, the popularity of street art is growing rapidly. The majority of Georgian street artists are concentrated in Tbilisi. Street art serves as a strong tool among young artists to protest against the many controversial issues in the social and political life in Georgia and thus gets considerable attention in society. Influential artists include Gagosh, TamOonz, and Dr.Love.

Sarajevo became a major hub for street art in Southeastern Europe in the 2010s. It hosts the Sarajevo Street Art Festival and the acclaimed 3D street art festival, Beton Fest. The former is held in July of every year and lasts for three days. Each year's edition is made up of numerous street performances, the creation of a new street arts bohemian quarter in the city, concerts, the painting of large murals and the showcasing of other creative art forms. The latter is the only 3D street art festival in Southeastern Europe and has hosted many renowned street artists such as Vera Bugatti, Giovanna la Pietra, Tony Cuboliquido, Manuel Bastante and others.

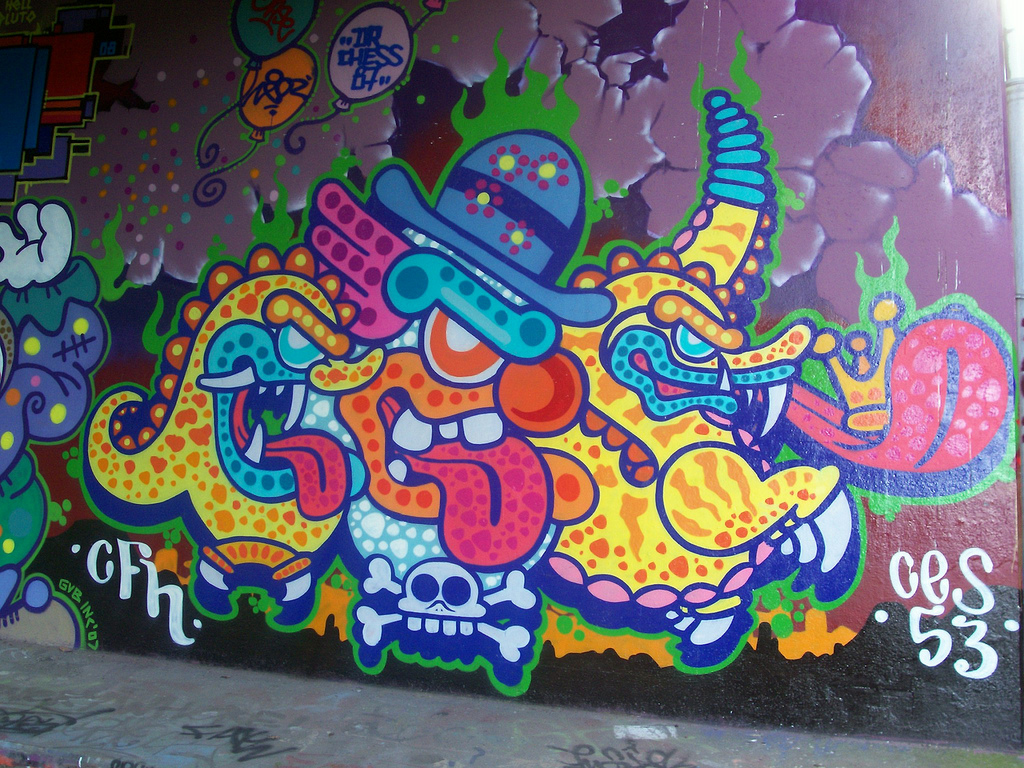
Painting in the Global Tradition by Ces53, a Dutch street artist

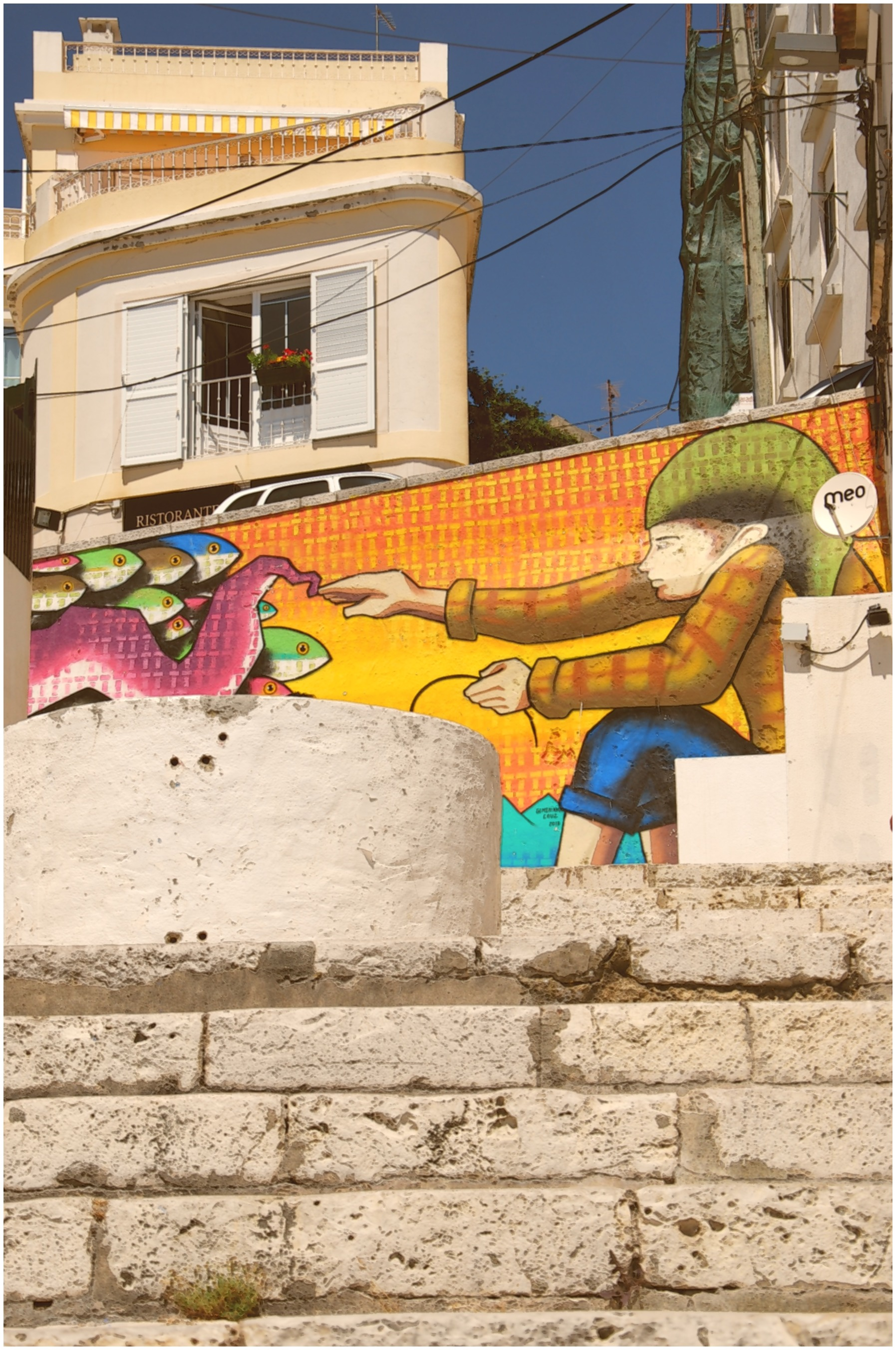
Street art in Sesimbra, Portugal

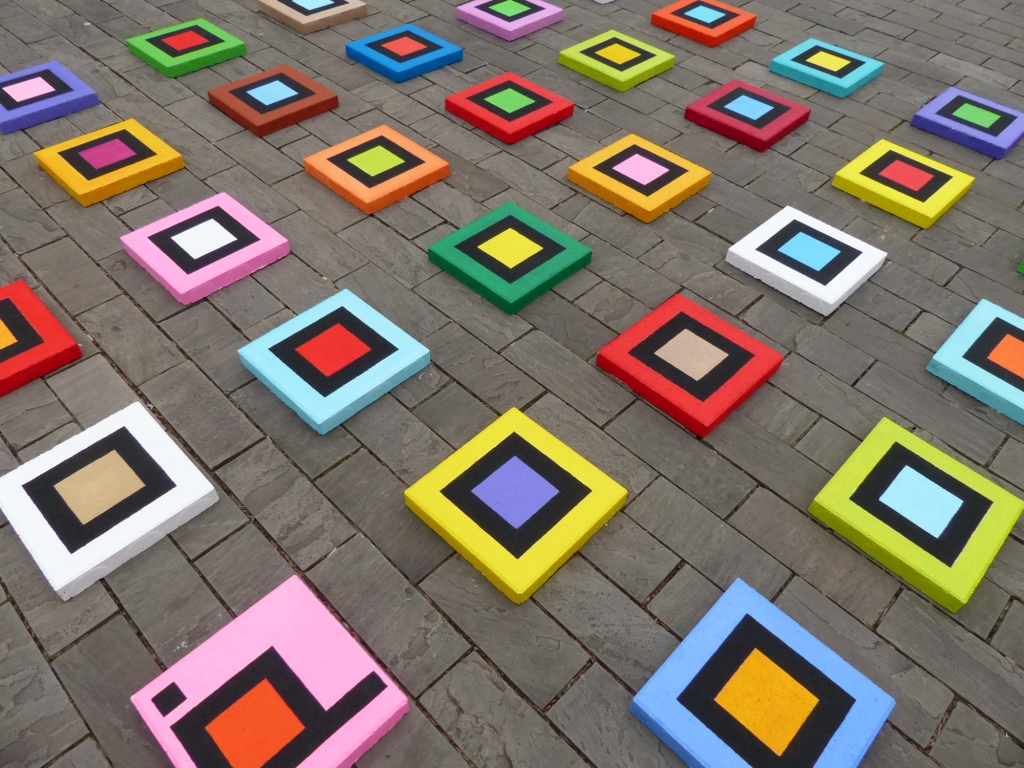
Graphic-Domain in Heidelberg, Germany, by Nicola Pragera

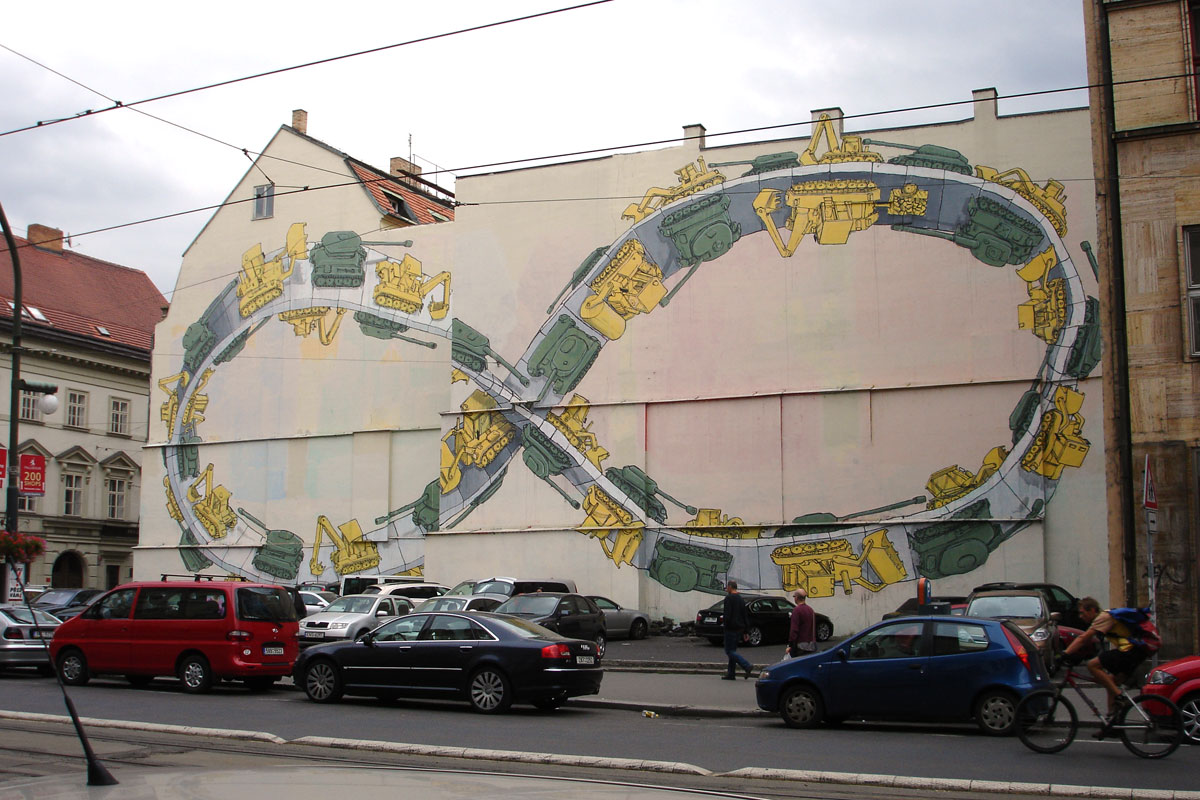
Mural by BLU, Gaza Strip, Prague, Czech Republic

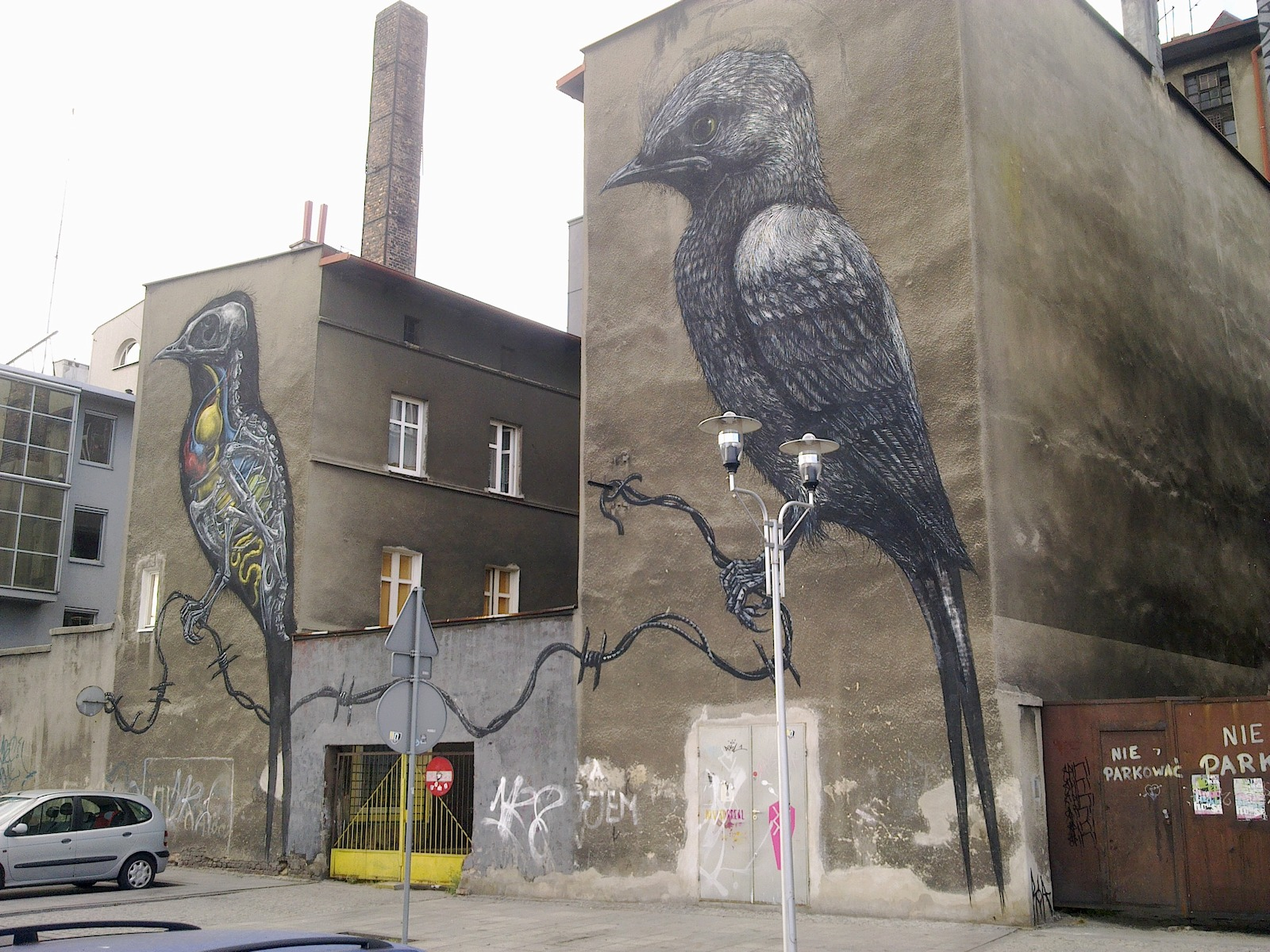
Urban art in Katowice, Poland

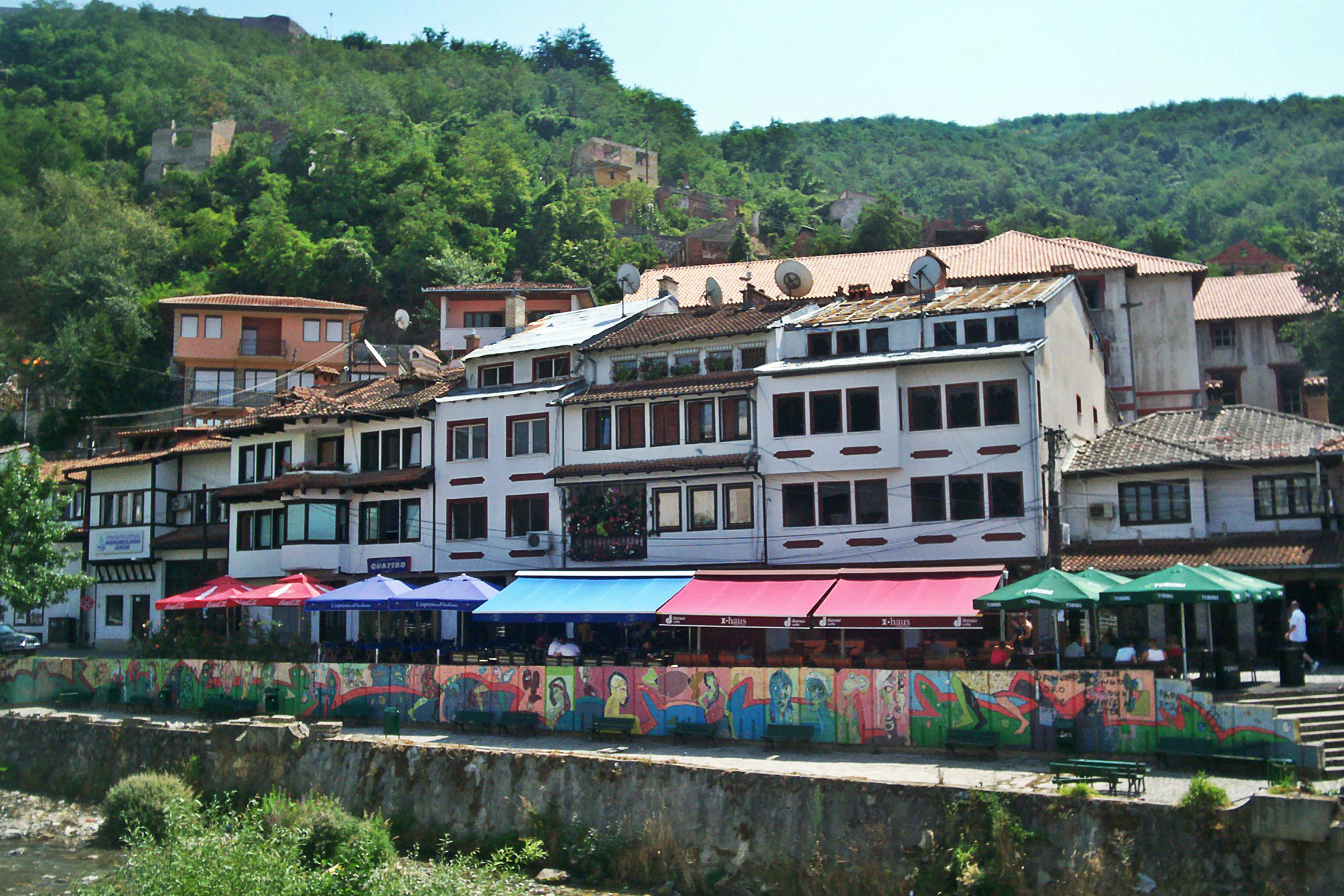
Street art in the old city of Prizren, Kosovo

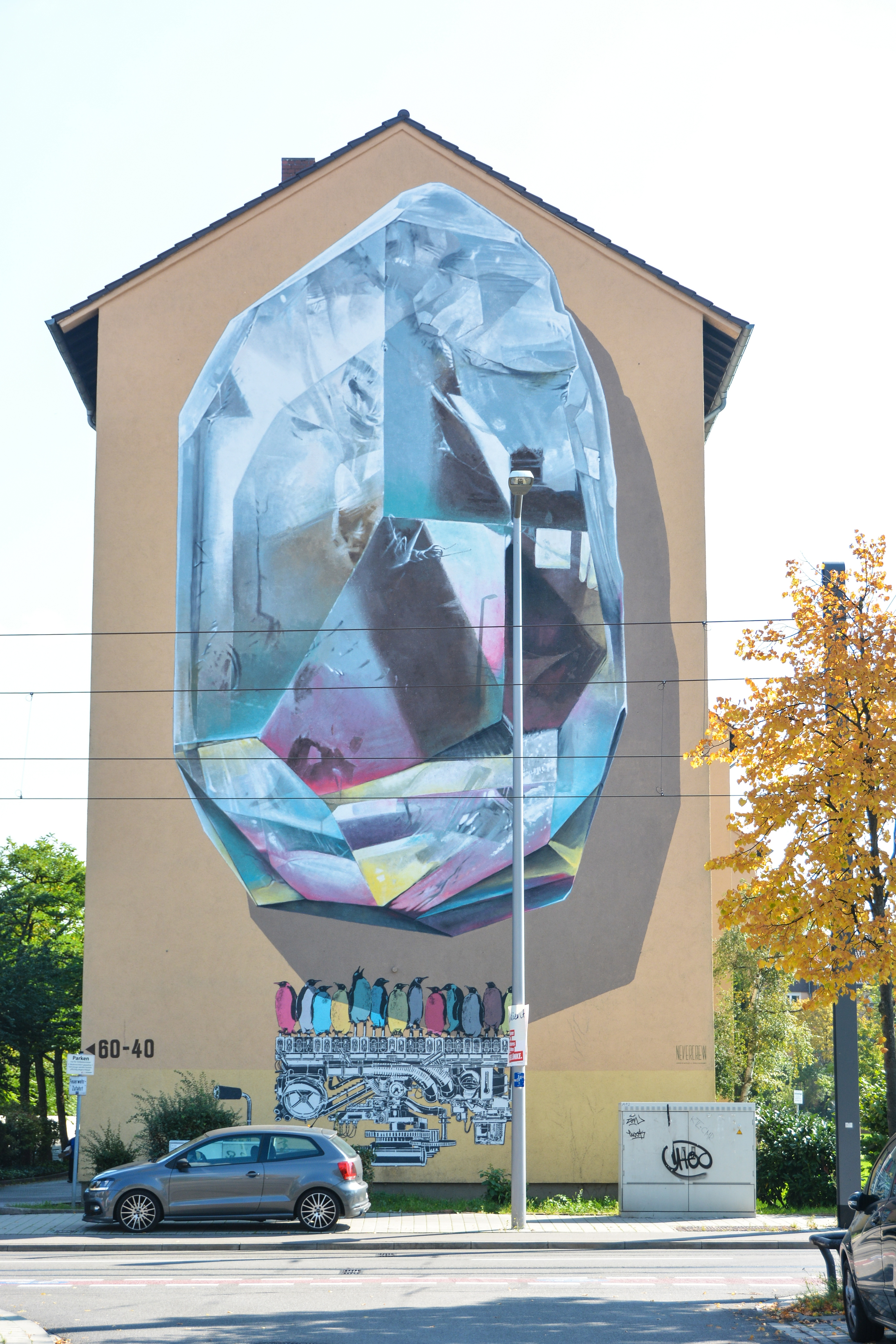
Mural painting "Propagating machine" realized by Nevercrew in Mannheim, Germany, in 2017

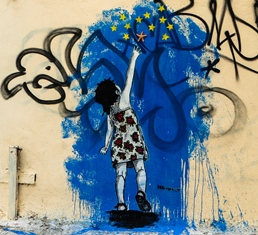
Work by Bleepsgr in Athens, Greece

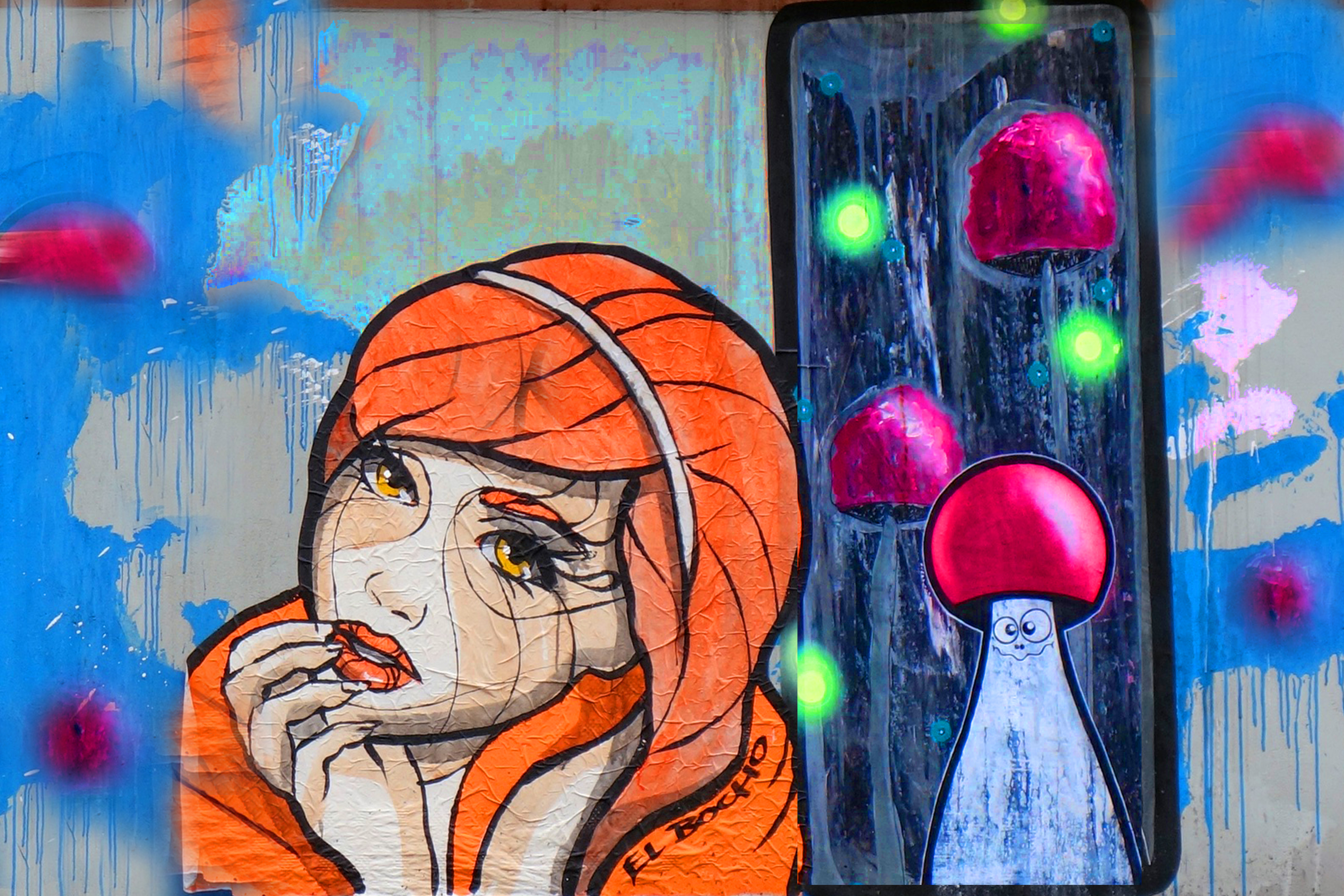
Paste-up of El Bocho in Hamburg, Germany

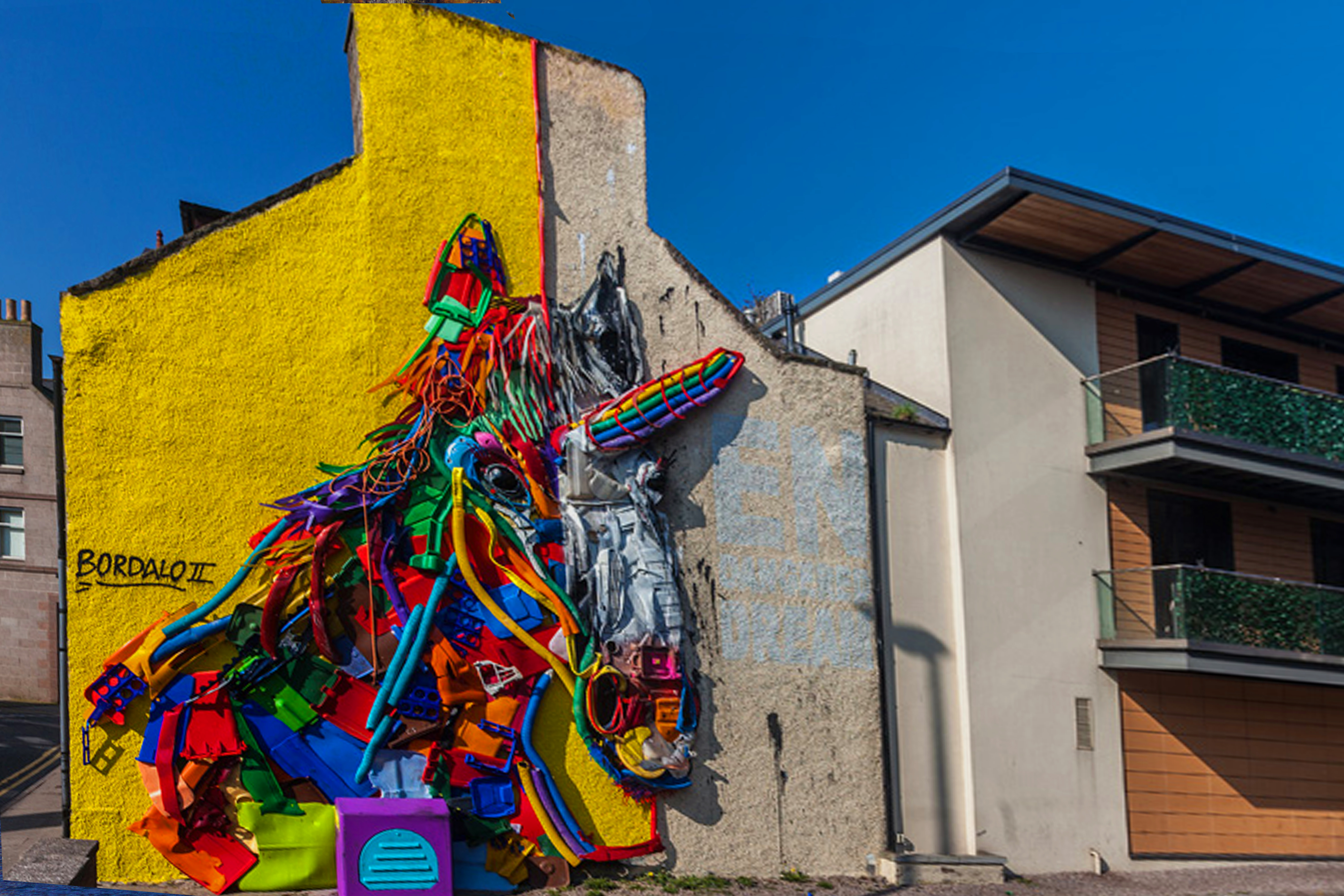
Unicorn made of waste by Portuguese street artist Artur Bordalo (BordaloII) at NuArt Festival Aberdeen (2018)

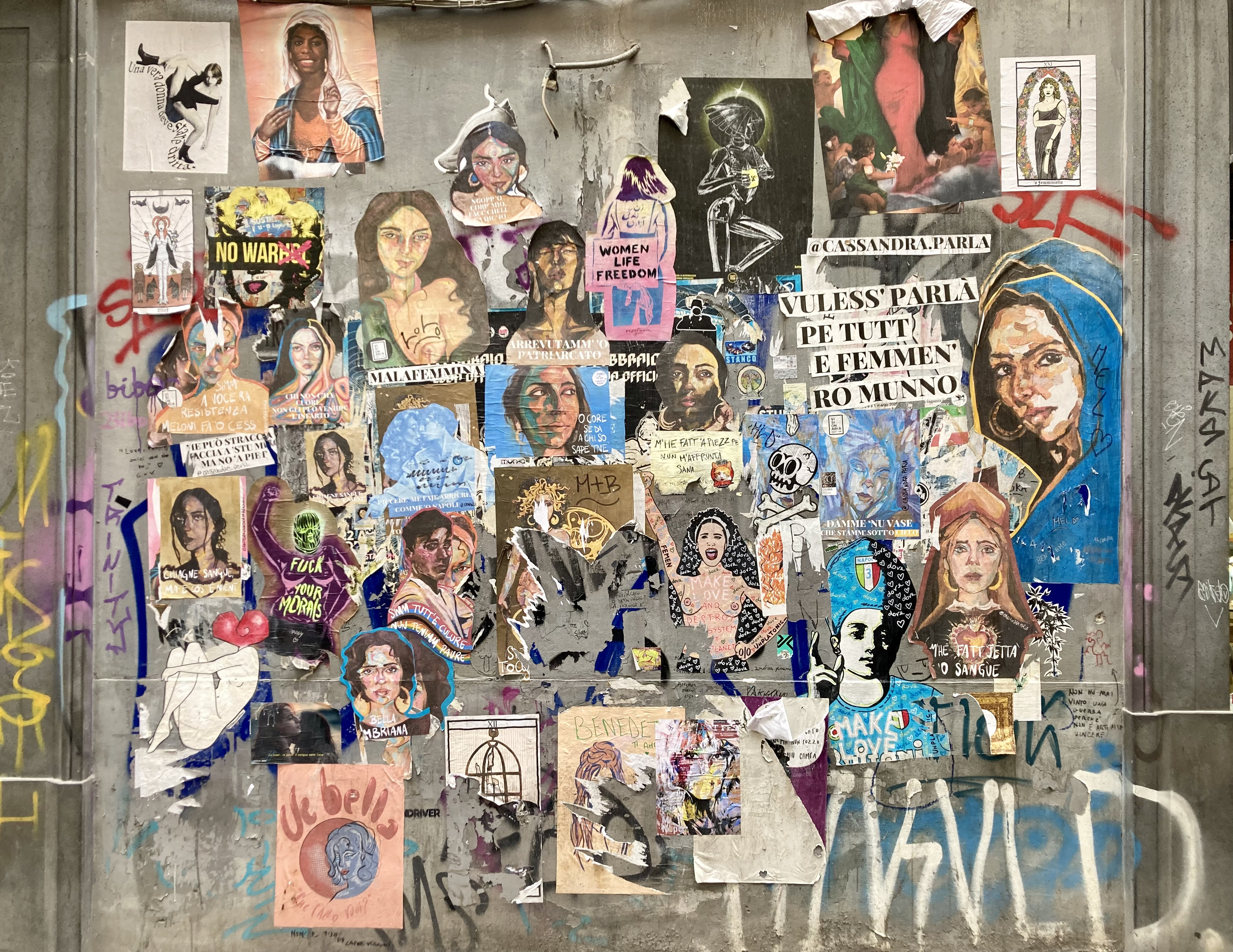
Street art in Naples

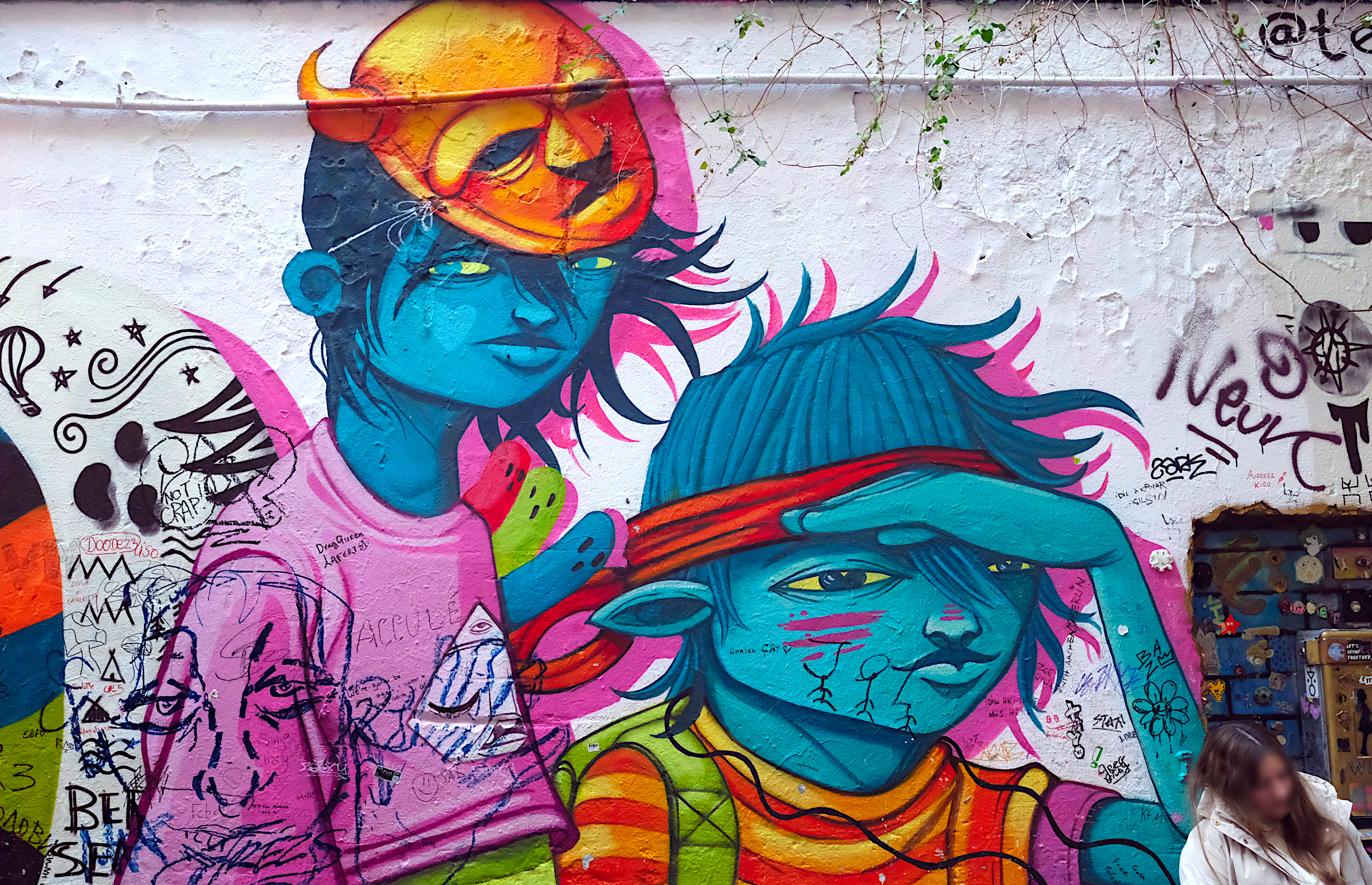
Urban art in Mitte (Berlin, 2025).

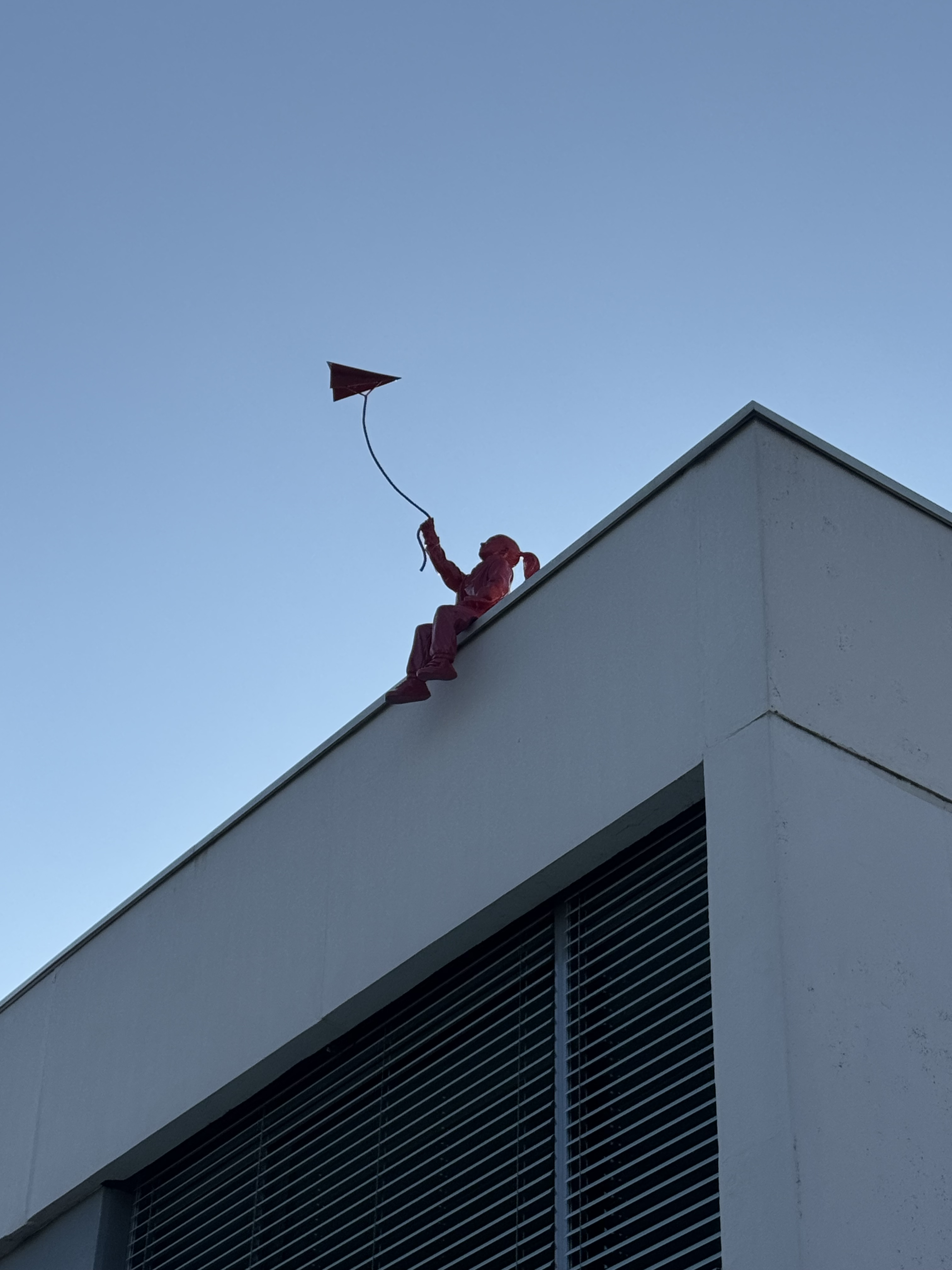
The little girl with the kite at ENAC (Toulouse, 2025).

3D mural Kit de Secours made by 3D artist Leon Keer in Plougasnou France.

=== Asia ===
==== India ====
In India, street art is hugely popular. Many of the film and TV series promotional materials were created by street painters/artists. Currently, digital art is replacing hand painted posters. From 1960 to the 1990s, the street posters worked well and impressed audiences. In the 1990s the hand painted posters started to be replaced by flex banners outside theatres. After the 2000s, the popularity of street posters started to decline, being replaced by digitally printed posters. Street art painting and street art drawing sketch has since declined in India due to the replacement by digital posters.

==== Malaysia ====
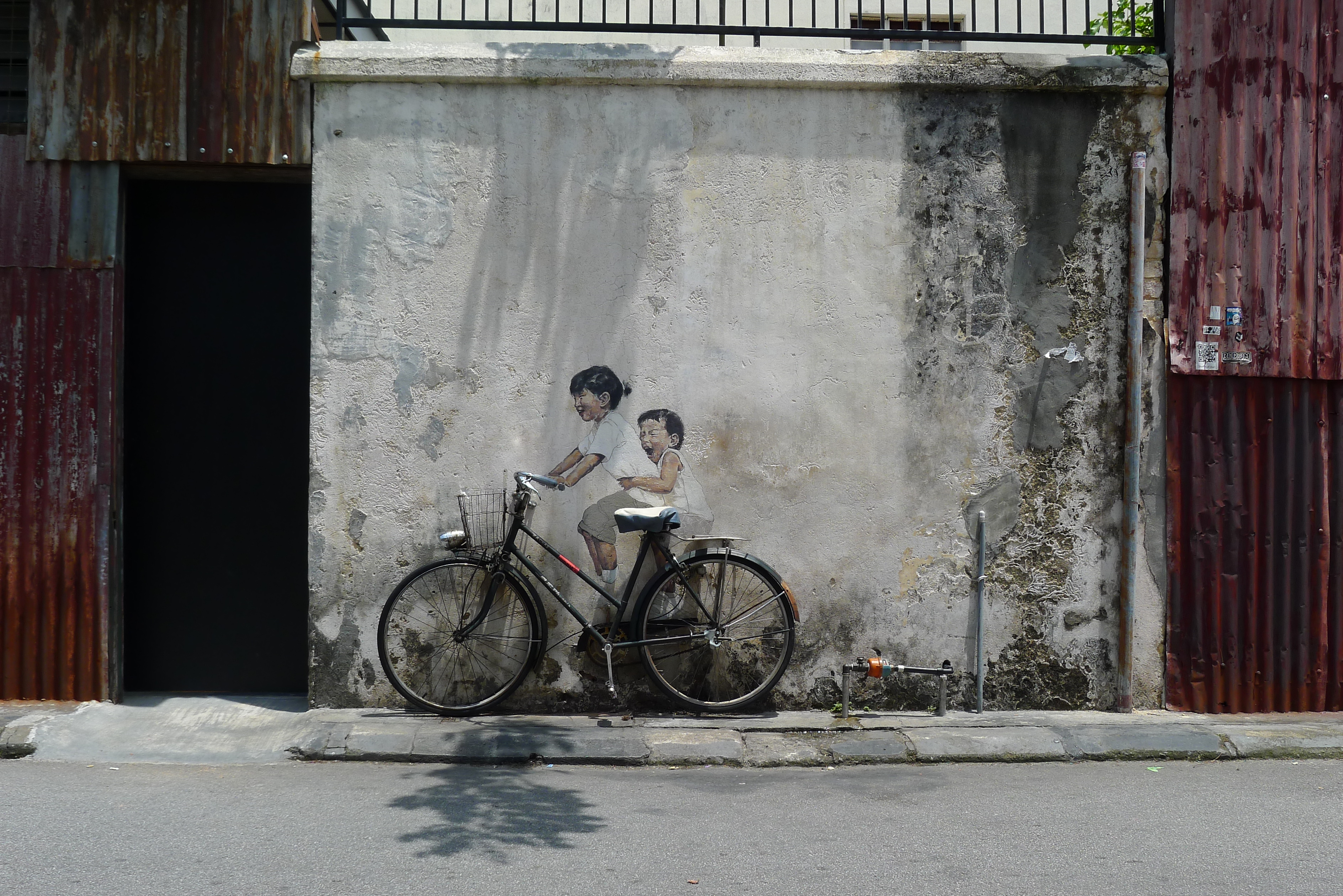
"Little Children on a Bicycle" mural on Armenian Street, George Town, Penang, by Lithuanian artist Ernest Zacharevic

In George Town, Penang, Lithuanian artist Ernest Zacharevic created a series of wall murals depicting local culture, inhabitants and lifestyles. They now stand as celebrated cultural landmarks of George Town, with Children on a Bicycle becoming one of the most photographed spots in the city. Since then, the street art scene has blossomed.

==== South Korea ====
In South Korea's second-largest city, Busan, German painter Hendrik Beikirch created a mural over 70 metres (230 ft) high, considered Asia's tallest at the time of its creation in August 2012. The monochromatic mural portrays a fisherman. It was organized by Public Delivery.

=== Thailand ===
A great deal of street art by well-known artists can be found in the Bang Rak district of Bangkok, on Soi Charoen Krung 28–32, between Charoen Krung road and the Chao Phraya river.

=== Israel ===
Areas of southern Tel Aviv including Florentin in the 1990s, evolved from an industrial zone into street-art districts. Artists repurposed its abandoned garages and crumbling façades with political murals, Hebrew poetry, religious verses and layered exchanges. Artists in the Tel Aviv scene include Dede, Klone, Broken Fingaz Crew, Know Hope, Kis-Lev and Sigalit Landau. Lord K2 said in a Times of Israel article this cultural revival spurred gentrification, prompting much of the graffiti scene to migrate elsewhere. Simon Durban, Banksy's former curater had an exhibition in Tel Aviv in 2025.

==== United Arab Emirates ====
In United Arab Emirates' largest city, Dubai, several famous painters created urban mural artwork on the buildings, which was initiated by StreetArtNews and named it Dubai Street Museum.

=== Oceania ===
==== Australia ====
There is street art in major cities as well as regional towns in Australia.

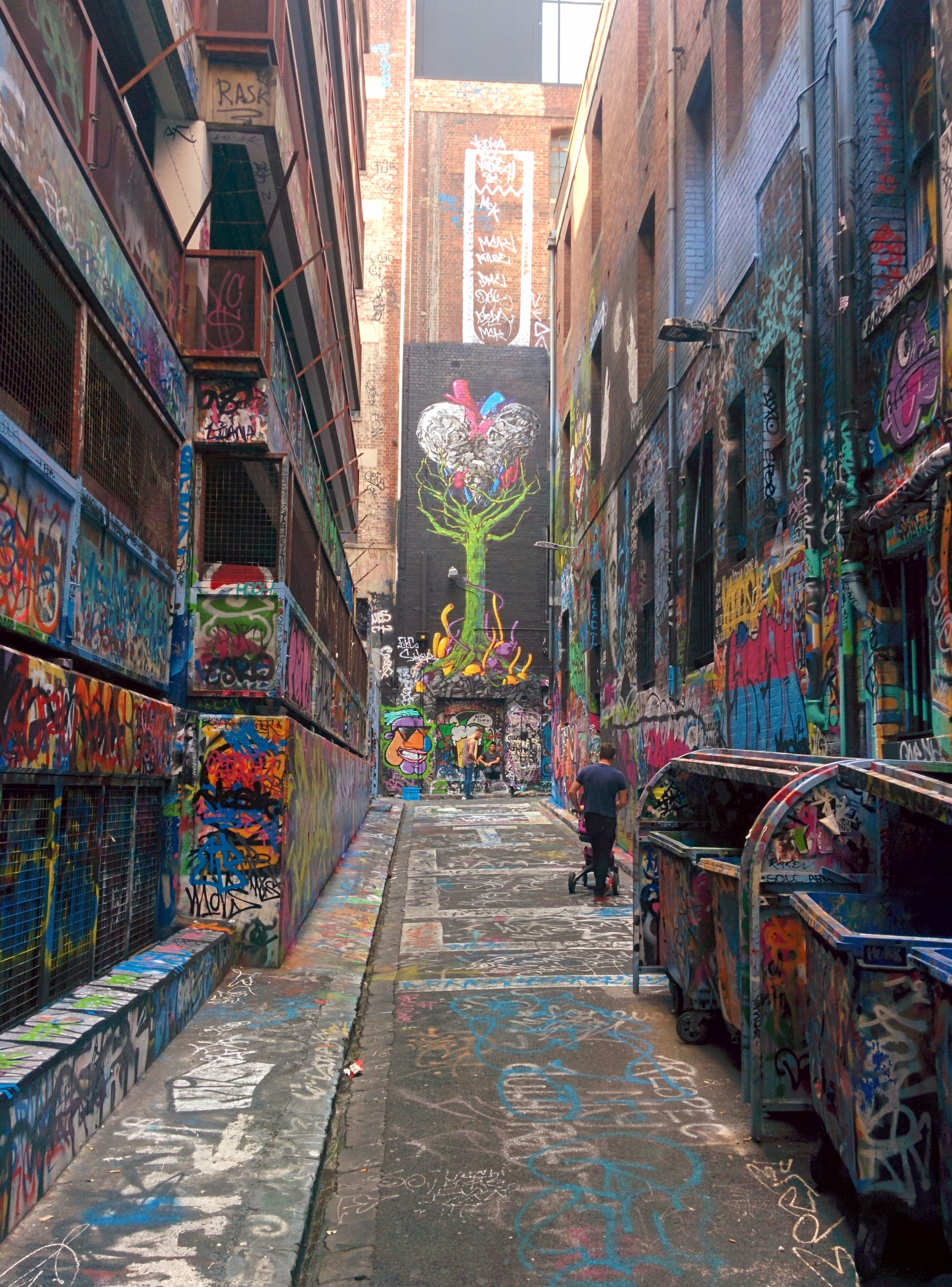
Hosier Lane Street Art, Melbourne, Victoria, Australia

Melbourne is home to one of the world's most active and diverse street art cultures and is home to pioneers in the stencil medium. Street artists such as Blek le Rat and Banksy often exhibited works on Melbourne's streets in the 2000s. Works are supported and preserved by local councils. Key locations within the city include Brunswick, Carlton, Fitzroy, Northcote and the city centre including the famous Hosier Lane.

Sydney's street art scene includes Newtown area graffiti and street art. Brisbane City Council supports graffiti on traffic signal boxes and other public spaces, although they prosecuted Anthony Lister in 2016 despite deputy mayor David Hinchliffe having encouraged him in 1999 to paint signal traffic boxes. The Brisbane Street Art Festival has been running annually since 2016. Many local governments throughout Australia run traffic signal box painting programs.

==== New Zealand ====
Dunedin pioneered "official" street art in New Zealand with over sixty bus shelters being given unique murals by painter John Noakes during the 1980s, many of them featuring local scenes or scenes inspired by the names of their locales. The Dunedin City Council has since commissioned a series of similar designs to grace electric boxes around the city. Street murals have also become a popular addition to Dunedin, with over 30 works by both local and overseas artists being added to the central city—especially around the Warehouse Precinct and Exchange areas—since an international street art festival was held there in the early 2000s. These include one of New Zealand's tallest works, a seven-story mural on the wall of the Southern Cross Hotel by Fintan Magee.

Christchurch was devastated by 2 earthquakes in 2010 and 2011 and as a result, 8000 homes and 80 percent of the central city were condemned. It wasn't until two and half years later that the city was able to host its first major cultural event – Rise Street Art Festival held at Canterbury Museum produced by Australasian street art organizer Oi YOU!.

The event attracted over 248,000 visitors (the most-visited show in the museum's history) and saw 15 murals painted across the devastated central city. The murals became community icons for the re-emergence and rebuild of Christchurch.

Two further Oi YOU! Festivals, both under the name of Spectrum, featured large internal exhibitions as well as adding to the city's stock of murals. Since Rise, over 40 murals have been produced in the central city and the Lonely Planet guide to global street art featured Christchurch as one of the best cities in the world to experience the art form.

In Auckland in 2009, Auckland's city council permitted electrical boxes to be used as canvases for street art. Local street art group TMD (The Most Dedicated) won the "Write For Gold" international competition in Germany two years in a row. Surplus Bargains is another local collective. In 2019 in Auckland, a heritage building in the city was painted without the owners' permission by Ares Artifex.

=== Africa ===
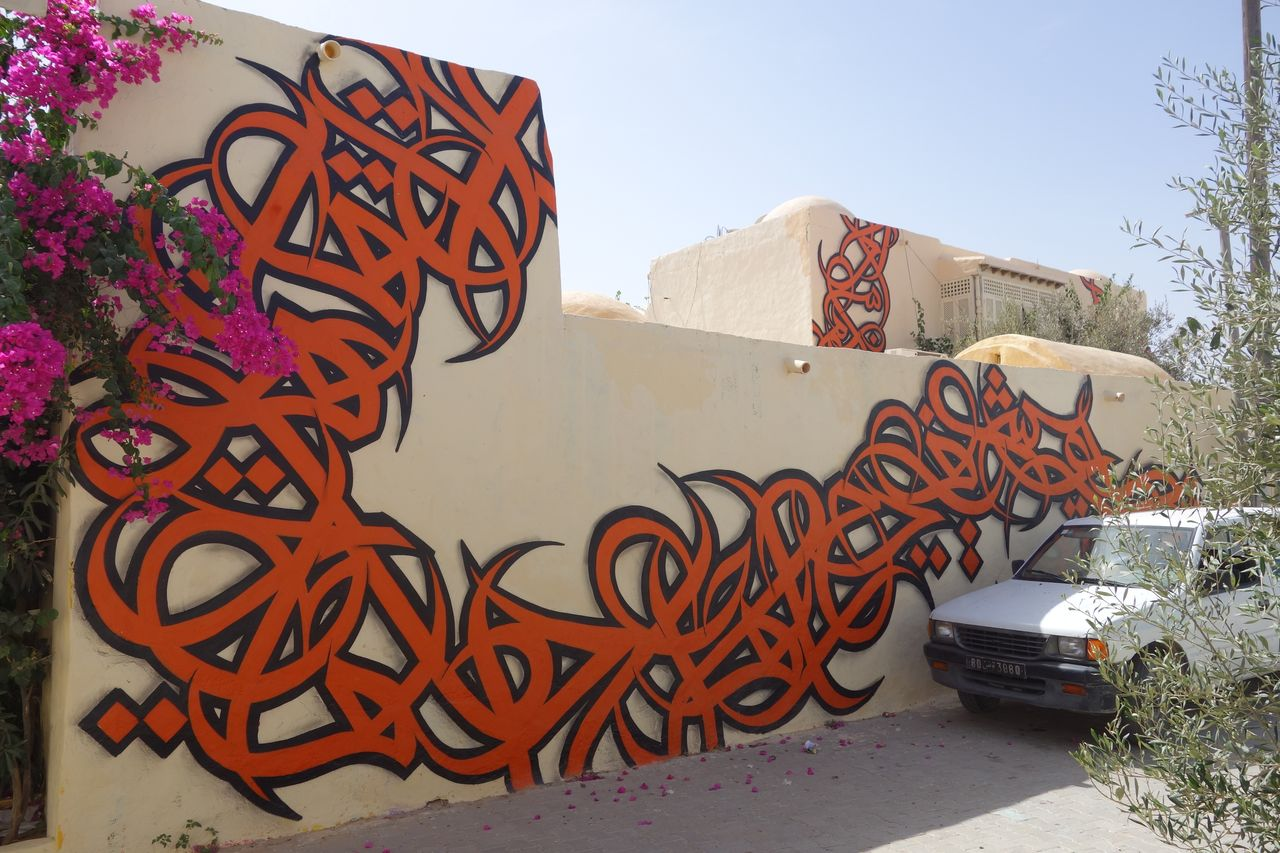
Calligraffiti in Djerbahood, Tunisia

Although street art in South Africa is not as ubiquitous as in European cities, Johannesburg's central Newtown district is a center for street art in the city. The "City Of Gold International Urban Art Festival" was held in the city's Braamfontein civic and student district in April 2012.

The New York Times reported Cairo's emergence as a street art center of the region in 2011. Slogans calling for the overthrow of the Mubarak regime has evolved into æsthetic and politically provocative motifs.

Street art from Egypt, Tunisia, Yemen, and Libya has gained notoriety since the Arab Spring, including a 2012 exhibition in Madrid's Casa Árabe.

== Exhibitions, festivals and conferences ==
In 1981, Washington Project for the Arts held an exhibition entitled Street Works, which included urban art pioneers such as Fab Five Freddy and Lee Quiñones working on the streets.

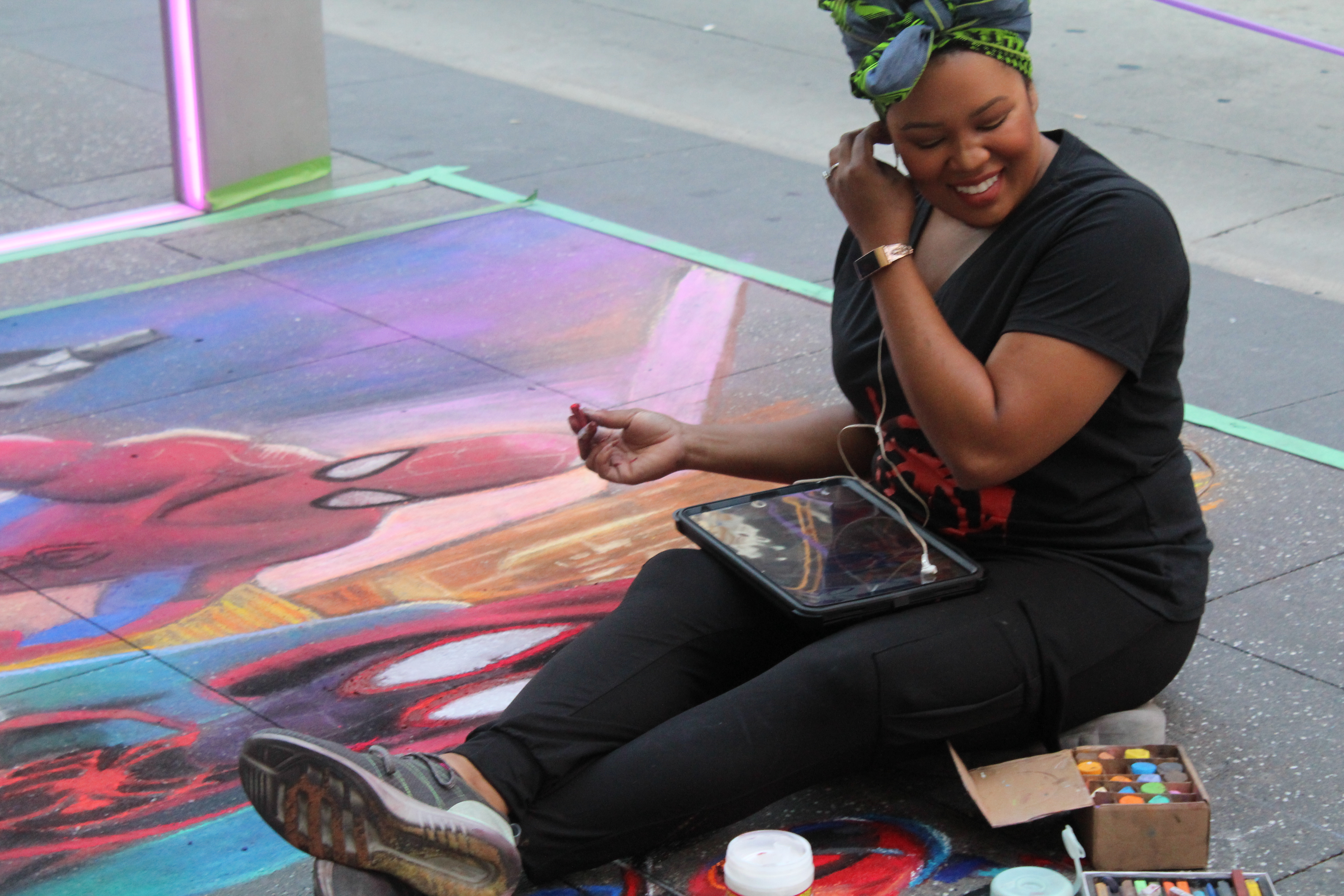
Amanda Harris of Southern California at the Minneapolis Street Art Festival in 2019

Sarasota Chalk Festival was founded in 2007 sponsoring street art by artists initially invited from the US and extended to internationally. In 2011 the festival introduced a Going Vertical mural program and its Cellograph project to accompany the street drawings. International films have been produced by and about artists who have participated in the programs, their murals and street drawings, and events at the festival.

The Streetart Festival Istanbul is Turkey's first annual street art and post-graffiti festival. The Festival was founded by the artist and graphics designer Pertev Emre Tastaban in 2007.

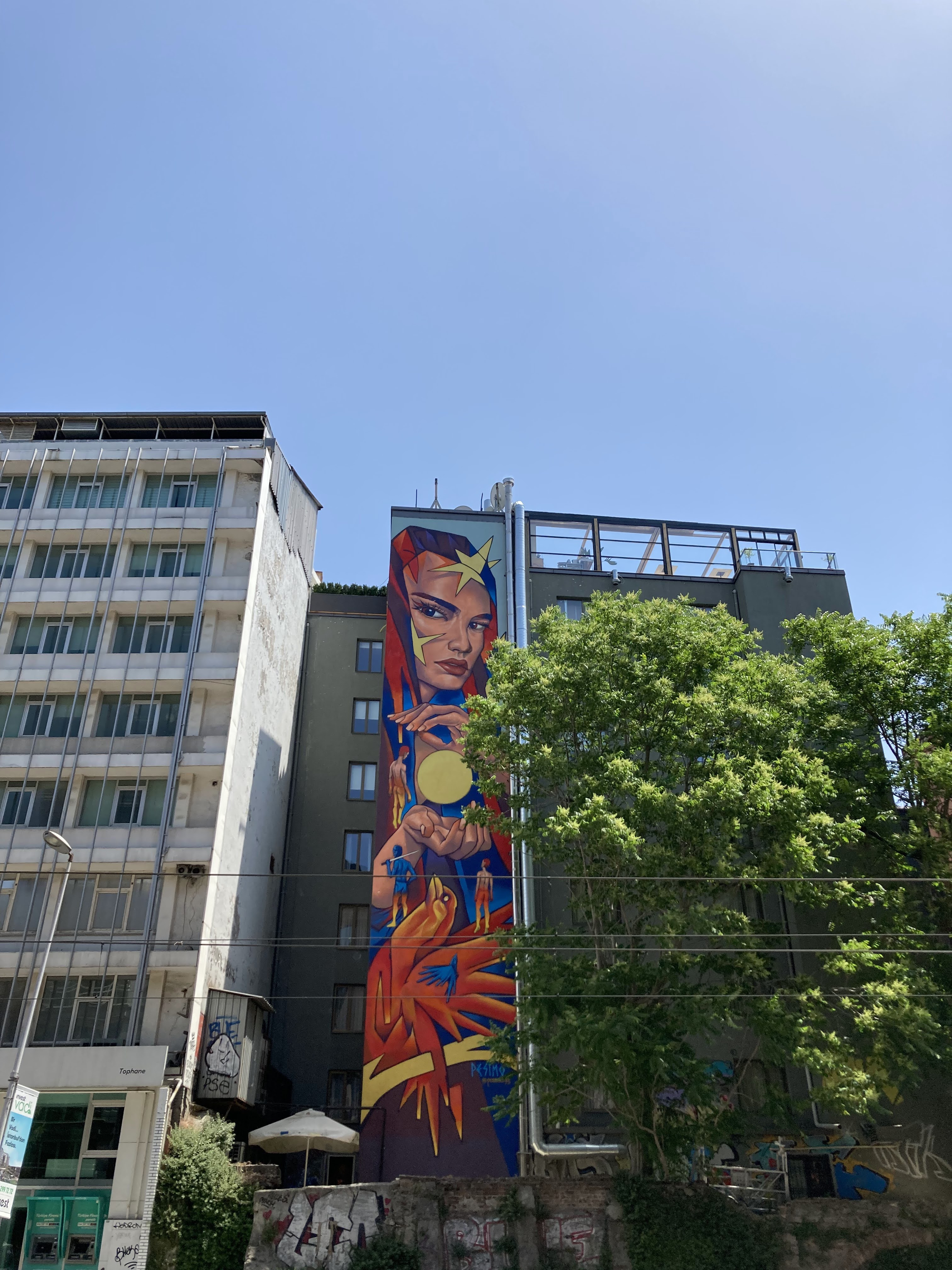
Mural by Peruvian artist Pésimo in Istanbul

Living Walls is an annual street art conference founded in 2009. In 2010 it was hosted in Atlanta and in 2011 jointly in Atlanta and Albany, New York. Living Walls was also active in promoting street art at Art Basel Miami Beach 2011.

The RVA Street Art Festival is a street art festival in Richmond, Virginia, began in 2012 along the Canal Walk. In 2013 it took place at the abandoned GRTC lot on Cary Street.

The Pasadena Chalk Festival, held annually in Pasadena, California, is the largest street-art festival in the world, according to Guinness World Records. The 2010 edition involved about six hundred artists and attracted more than 100,000 visitors.

UMA – Universal Museum of Art launched a comprehensive Street Art exhibition "A Walk Into Street Art" in April 2018. This exhibition in virtual reality offers works from Banksy, JR, Jef Aérosol, Vhils, Shepard Fairey, Keith Haring, among others.

The Eureka Street Art Festival is an annual public art event in Humboldt County, California. Artists from California and the world paint murals and create street art during a week-long festival. In 2018, 24 artists create 22 pieces of public art in the Old Town area of the city, focusing on Opera Alley. The 2019 festival is centered on the Downtown region.

=== Documentary films ===
- Rash (2005), a feature-length documentary by Mutiny Media exploring the cultural value of Australian street art and graffiti
- Bomb It (2008), a documentary film about graffiti and street art around the world
- Exit Through the Gift Shop (2010), a documentary created by the artist Banksy about Thierry Guetta
- Style Wars (1983), a PBS documentary about graffiti artists in New York City featuring Seen, Kase2, Dez and Dondi
- Obey Giant (2017), a documentary about the life and career of street artist, illustrator, graphic designer, activist, and founder of OBEY Clothing, Shepard Fairey.

== See also ==
- Brandalism
- Border art
- Contemporary art
- Craftivism
- Eyesaw
- Fr. Pat Noise plaque
- Glossary of graffiti
- Graphopoli
- Guerrilla art and hacking art (category)
- List of street artists
- Overspray Magazine
- Papergirl
- Street art in Israel
- Tower 13
- USB dead drop
- Utility box art
