= Street art in Atlanta =

In recent years, Atlanta has been called one of the USA's best cities for street art. Street artists have prominently created murals in Krog Street Tunnel, along the BeltLine, and in neighborhoods across the city. The street art conference, Living Walls, the City Speaks, originated in Atlanta in 2009.

== Events and festivals ==
Atlanta is host to the street art conference Living Walls, the City Speaks. In 2012, the conference limited participation to women street artists.

The Outerspace Project, an annual series of street art and cultural events coordinated by Greg Mike, began in 2015.

Peter Ferrari founded Forward Warrior, an event and initiative to bring together muralists in Atlanta to add street art to a host neighborhood.

== Locations ==
Images and mapped locations of over 200 works of Atlanta street art can be found on the Atlanta Street Art Map. Hotspots for viewing Atlanta street art include:

- The Krog Street Tunnel
- The 22-mile BeltLine path which circles the inner city along industrial and residential spaces
- In Cabbagetown, Atlanta along Tennelle St and the Wylie Street wall of the CSX railroad's Hulsey rail yard.
- In Inman Park around the intersection of Krog St. and Edgewood Ave.
- In East Atlanta surrounding the intersections of Flat Shoals Road and Edgewood Ave.
- In Little Five Points surrounding the intersections of Euclid Ave. and Moreland Ave.
- In Sweet Auburn along Edgewood Ave.

== Notable Atlanta street artists ==
=== John Morse ===
In 2010, ten haiku poems of artist John Morse were featured on 500 'bandit' signs posted around the streets of Atlanta, a guerrilla installation that received extensive press coverage including The New Yorker, The Guardian, NPR and South African national radio.

=== Greg Mike ===
Greg Mike began doing graffiti when he was 13 years old, and he started painting murals in his twenties. His murals are prominent in Atlanta's Old Fourth Ward neighborhood. Mike is known for his Loudmouf Larry depictions in his art.

=== Fabian Williams ===
Fabian Williams creates murals under his pseudonym Occasional Superstar. In 2017, Williams painted a mural of native Georgian and civil rights leader Hosea Williams. In 2017, Playboy named Fabian Williams a "New Creative".

=== Other notable street artists ===
- Olive47
- Sarah Emerson
- Sanithna
- Evereman
- Matt Haffner – works on shipping containers in the Old Fourth Ward, amongst others.
- BlackCatTips / Kyle Brooks
- Alex Brewer, a.k.a. HENSE
- Sever
- Yoyo Ferro
- Peter Ferrari
- 70Dot
- Lauren Pallotta Stumberg
- CisneArts
- Bornartistofficial
- Doitdoitleague
- Nat.hugs.cats
- EvilTwinBrother

== City efforts to remove street art ==
On April 1, 2011, Alex Brewer, also known as HENSE, and several other local Atlanta graffiti artists, were sued for $1 million by Atlanta neighborhood property owners. However, shortly after HENSE and several artists countersued stating they had nothing to do with the work that they were being sued for. Despite HENSE's prolific "all-city status" for tags, his 2010 grant proposals for city-funded wall paintings on Arizona Avenue and along the Atlanta BeltLine were all accepted.

=== Graffiti Task Force ===
In May 2011 the City of Atlanta established a Graffiti Task Force. In October 2011 the police arrested 7 persons that they designated as vandals and some regard as artists. However, city officials assert that they have no intention of stifling the street art scene. The city selected 29 murals which would not be painted over including those commissioned as part of the BeltLine and works created during the Living Walls conferences. But the list did not include the most famous street art space in the city, the Krog Street Tunnel. Many street artists and members of the arts community interviewed by Creative Loafing believe the city's efforts are misdirected or futile.

=== Lawsuit against the city of Atlanta ===
In May 2017, the city of Atlanta began regulating murals on private property, enforcing a 1982 ordinance that artists and property owners must complete an application process to obtain approval from the city or face a $1,000 fine and up to six months' confinement. A group of artists, including Fabian Williams, Peter Ferrari, and Yoyo Ferro, sued the city, claiming the ordinance was unconstitutional. In June 2017, the city settled the lawsuit, agreeing not to require artists to obtain city approval for murals on private property.

== Gallery ==
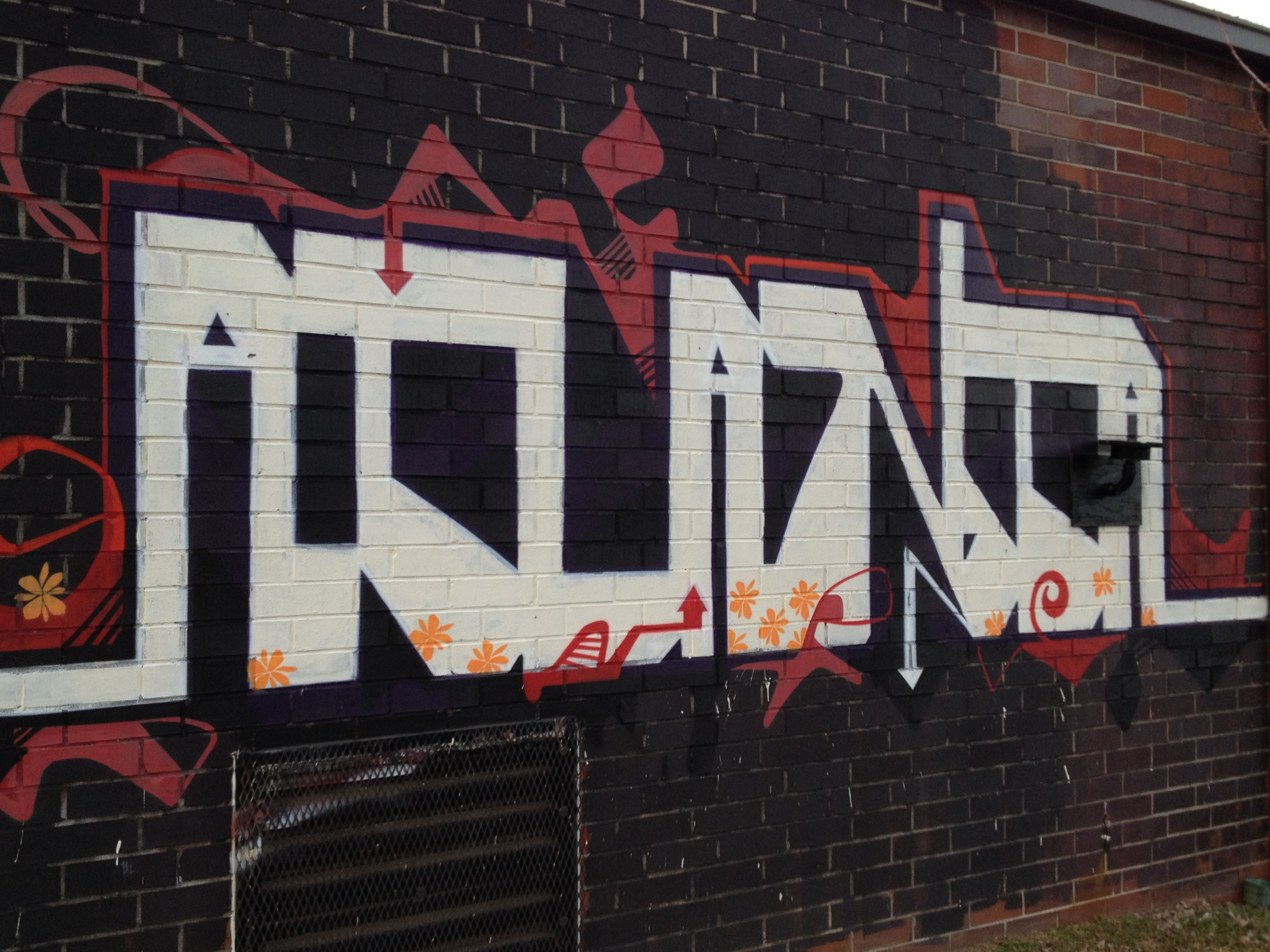

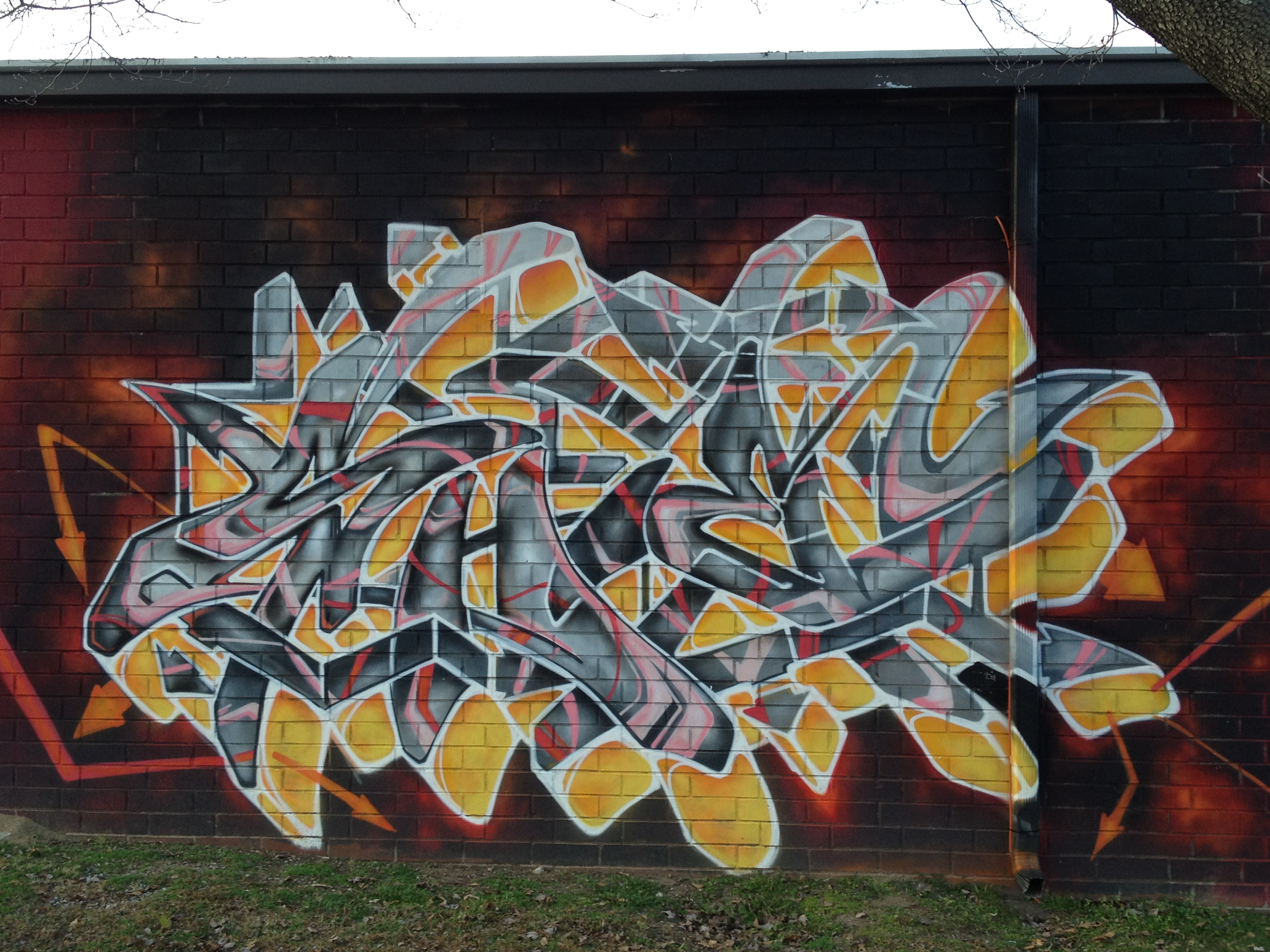

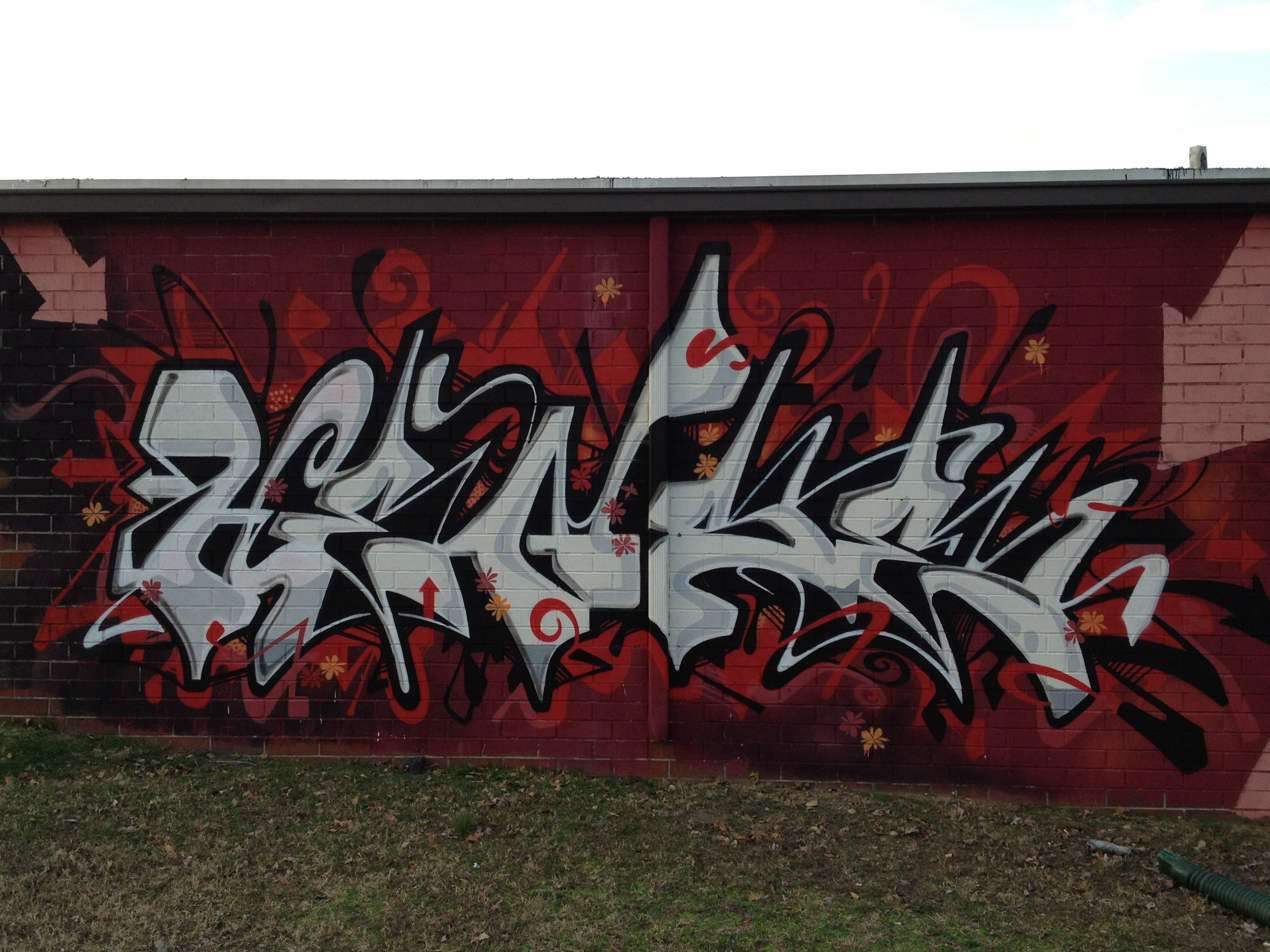

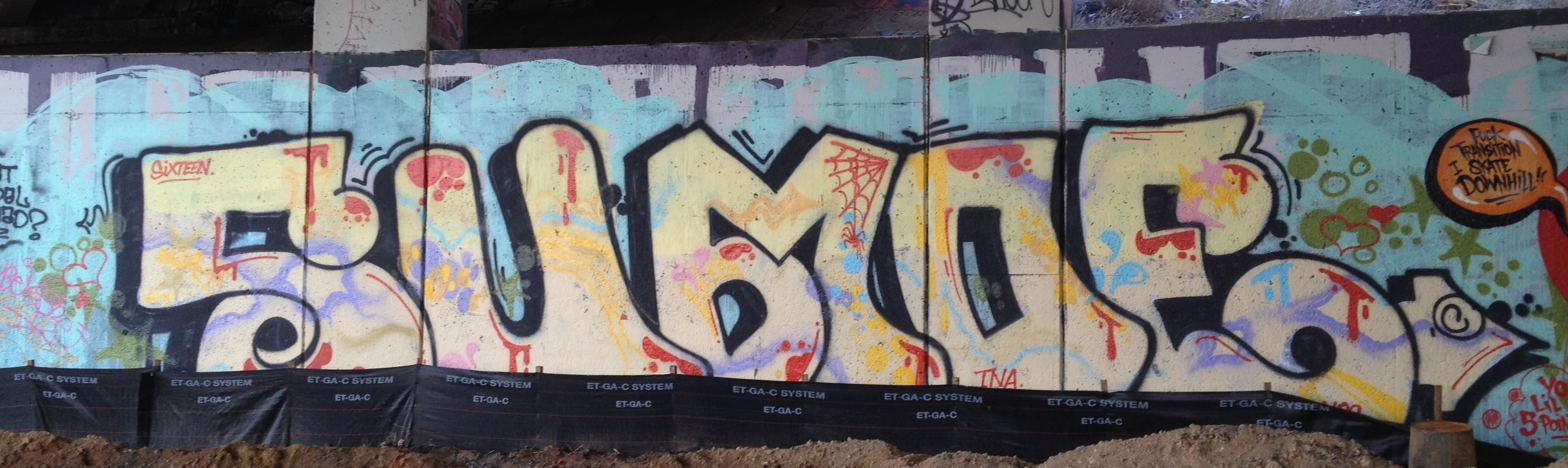

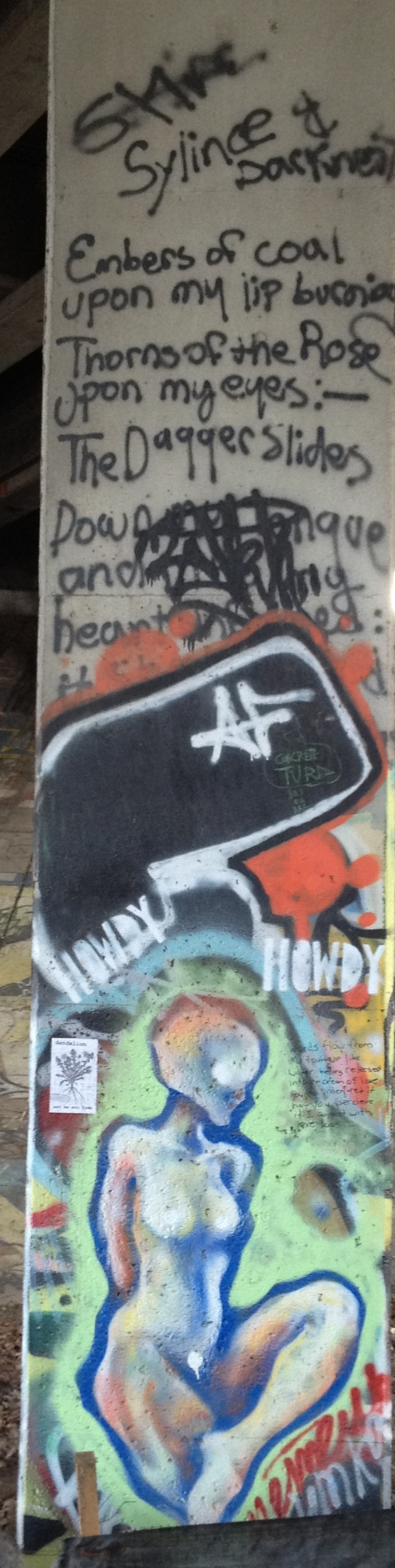

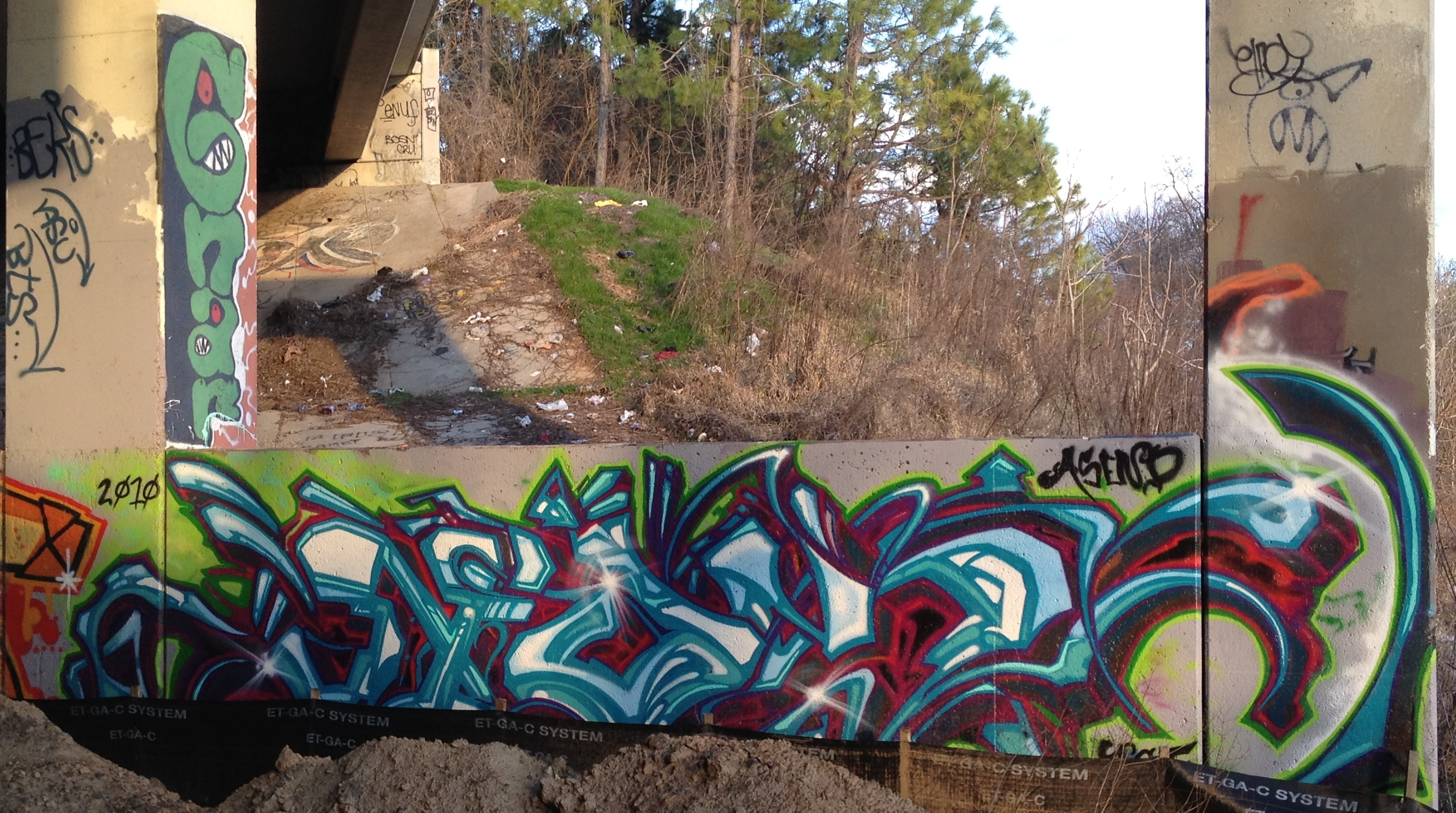

== See also ==
- Arts in Atlanta
