= Nicolás Romero =

Nicolás Romero may refer to:

- Ciudad Nicolás Romero, city and municipality in State of Mexico, Mexico
- Ever (artist) (Nicolás Romero), Argentine street artist
- Nicolás Romero (colonel) (1827–1865), Mexican military figure
- Nicolás Romero (footballer) (born 2003), Argentine footballer
- Tiquicheo de Nicolás Romero, municipality in Michoacán, Mexico
