= Ever (artist) =

Argentine street artist

Nicolás Romero, known as Ever is a street art artist from Buenos Aires, Argentina. Ever has been commissioned for works in Miami's Wynwood Walls street art district, and to paint a parking garage wall on Atlanta's Second Avenue as part of the Living Walls conference.

Ever began painting graffiti on his city's streets in the 1990s, starting with letter-based works. Since then, his work has evolved towards portraits of people, which Ever claimed is due to the influence of Gustav Klimt, Francis Bacon and Vincent van Gogh. Ever's preference is to paint ordinary people, based on photos he finds on the Internet, or people he sees on the streets, or simply his own brother. The "painterly" style of portraits is more typical of paintings found in a gallery than in street art. Ever uses both aerosol and brush-based techniques in his work.
