= Arts in Atlanta =

Cultural resources in Atlanta

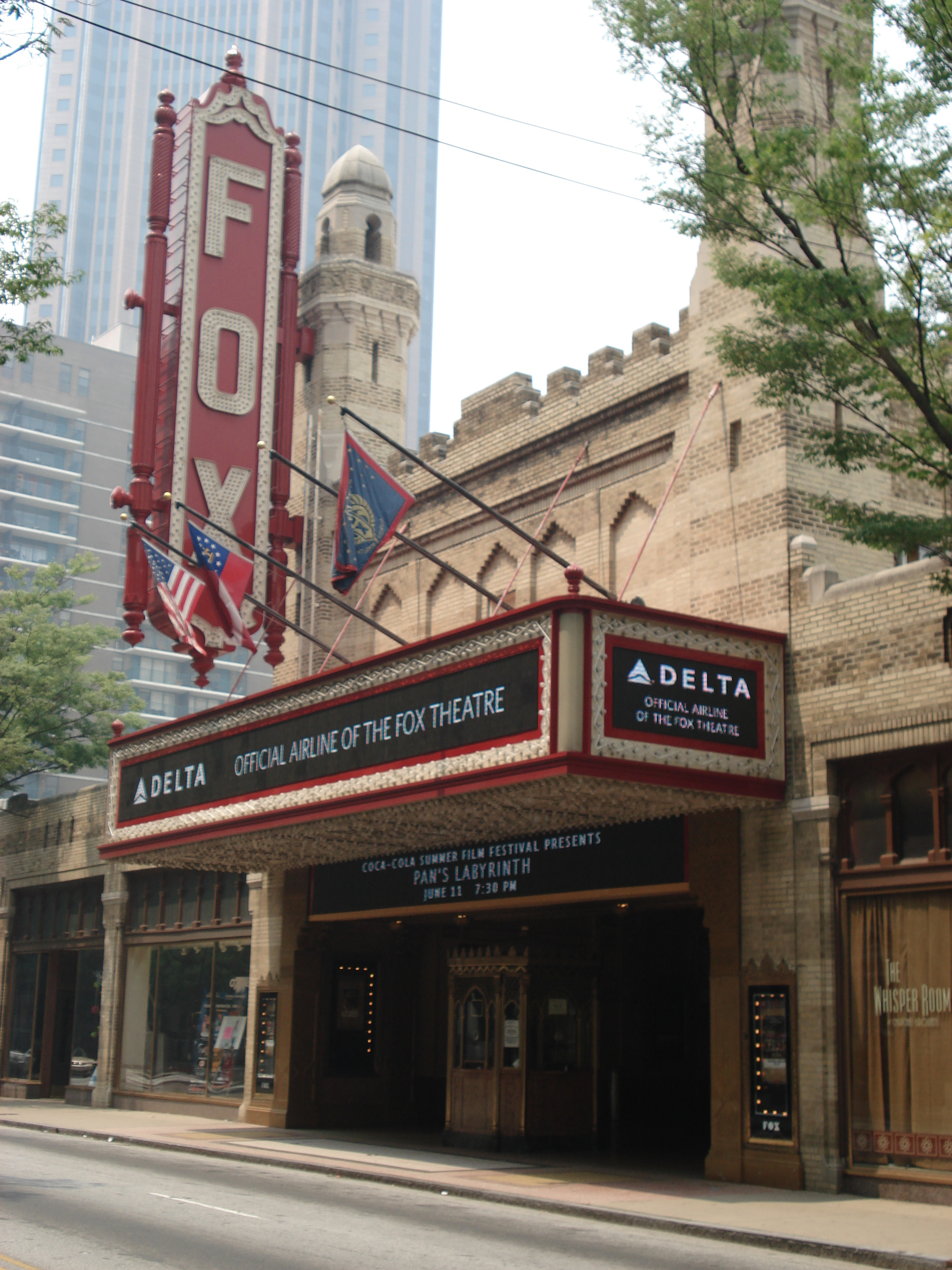
Fox Theater

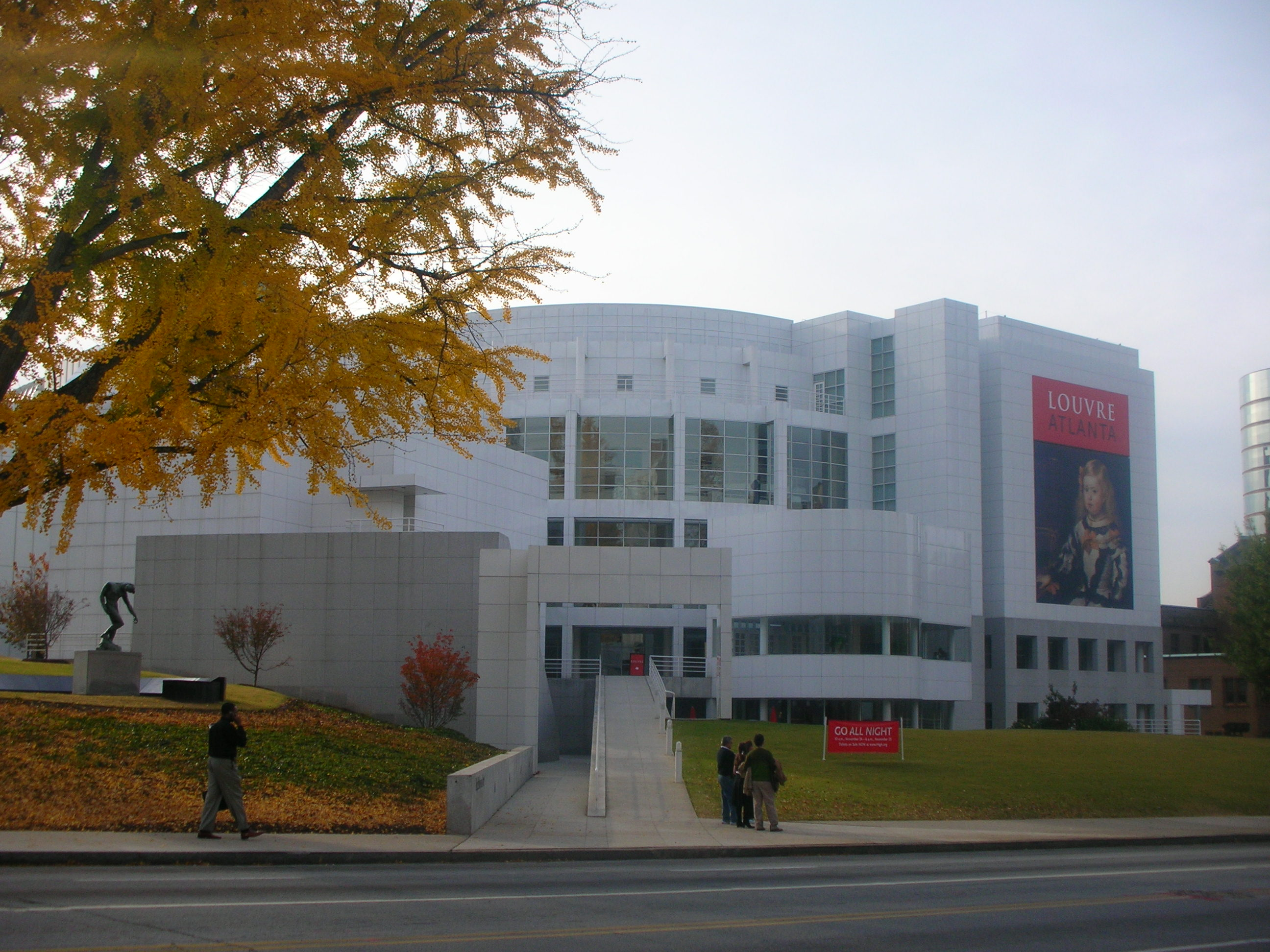
High Museum of Art

The arts in Atlanta are well-represented, with a prominent presence in music, fine art, and theater.

== Music ==
Atlanta has played a major or contributing role in the development of various genres of American music at different times in the city's history. Beginning as early as the 1920s, Atlanta emerged as a center for country music, which was brought to the city by migrants from Appalachia. During the countercultural 1960s, Atlanta hosted the Atlanta International Pop Festival in 1969 more than a month before Woodstock and featuring many of the same bands. The city was also a center for Southern rock during the 1970s: the Allman Brothers Band's hit instrumental "Hot 'Lanta" is an ode to the city, while Lynyrd Skynyrd's live rendition of "Free Bird" was recorded at the Fox Theatre in 1976, with lead singer Ronnie Van Zant directing the band to "play it pretty for Atlanta." During the 1980s, Atlanta had an active punk rock scene that was centered on two of the city's music venues, 688 Club and the Metroplex, and Atlanta played host to the Sex Pistols first U.S. show, which was performed at the Great Southeastern Music Hall. The 1990s saw the birth of Atlanta hip hop, a subgenre that gained relevance following the success of home-grown duo OutKast; however, it was not until the 2000s that Atlanta moved "from the margins to becoming hip-hop's center of gravity, part of a larger shift in hip-hop innovation to the South." Also in the 2000s, Atlanta was recognized by Vice magazine for its Indie rock scene, which revolves around the EARL in East Atlanta Village.

=== Hip hop ===
Atlanta hip hop Atlanta has been called "hip-hop's center of gravity," and the city is considered a capital of hip hop, including Southern hip hop, of R&B and of neo soul. The city is the current home or birthplace of many hip-hop artists including Lil Jon, Ludacris, B.o.B and Usher. It is also a center of gospel music where the Gospel Music Association Dove Awards take place.

== Visual arts ==
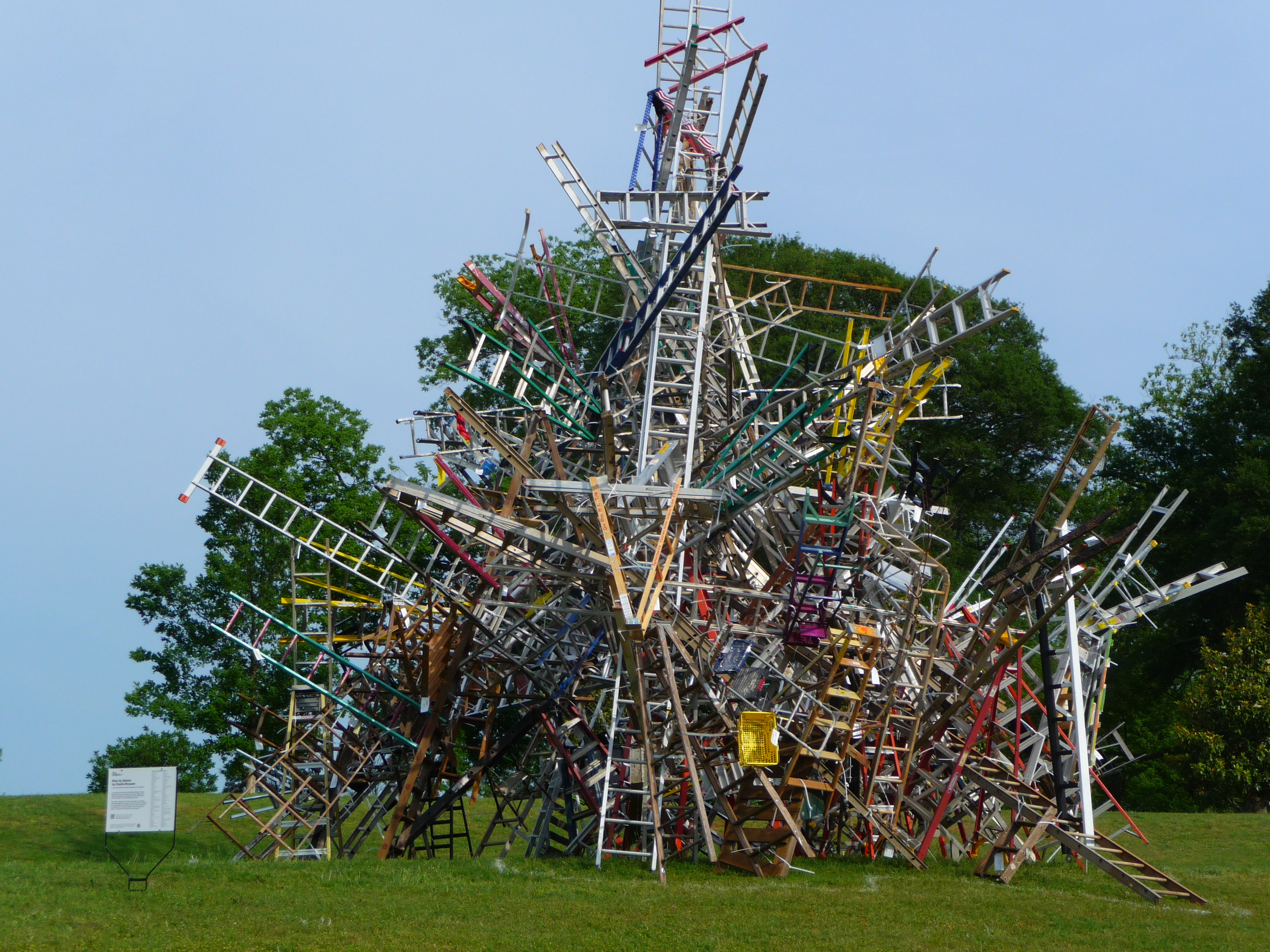
Rise Up Atlanta, by Charlie Brouwer, was a temporary urban-art sculpture made of ladders erected in the East Side's Freedom Park

Atlanta is home to an established visual arts community. In 2010, the city was ranked as the ninth-best city for the arts by American Style Magazine. Most of the city's art galleries are located in the Castleberry Hill and West Midtown neighborhoods. While every type of visual art is represented in the city, Atlanta is a major center for contemporary art, public art, and urban art. The growing Atlanta campus of Savannah College of Art and Design has brought in a steady stream of artists and curators.

=== Art museums ===
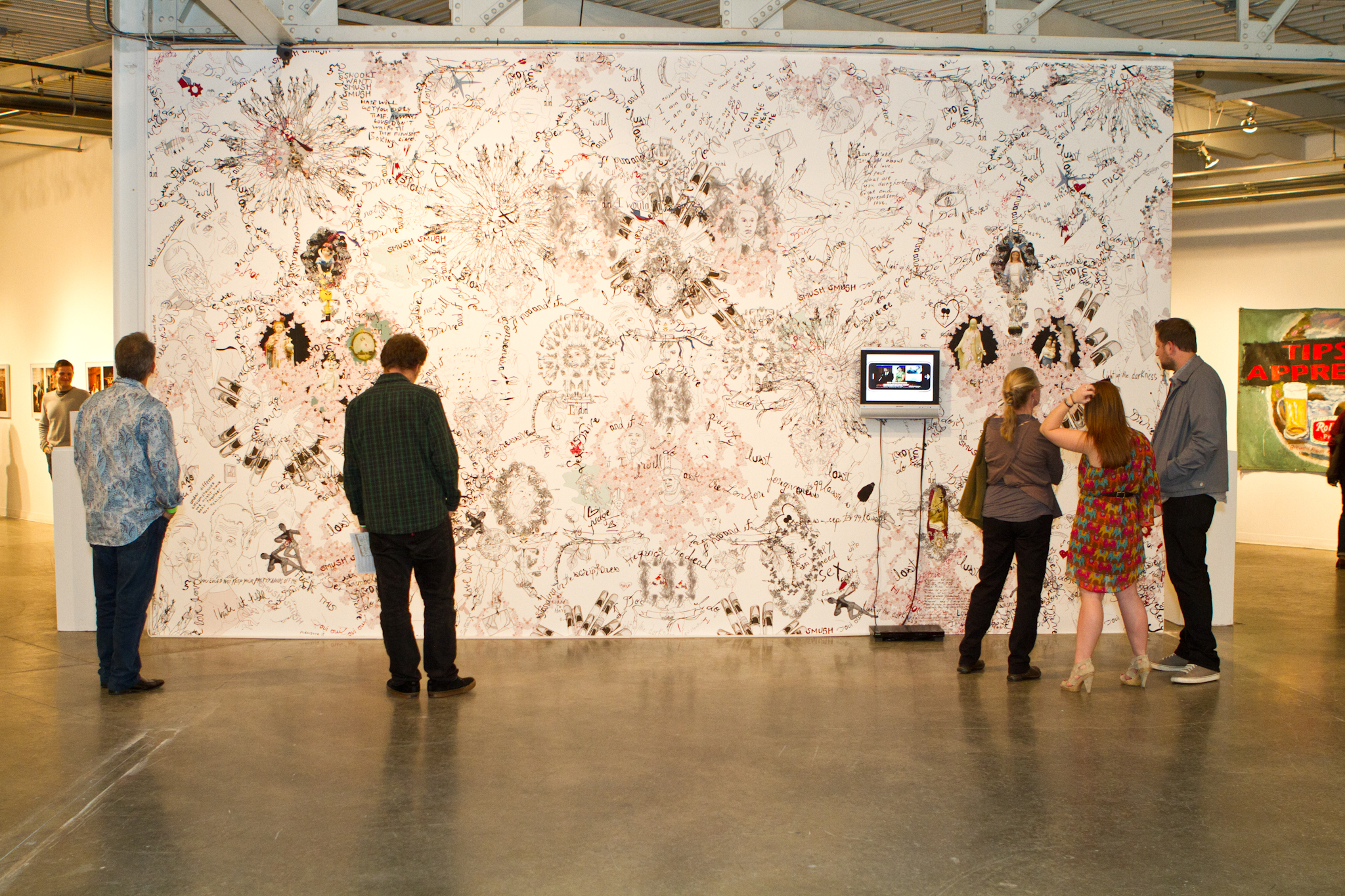
An exhibit at the Atlanta Contemporary Art Center (Sex Drive, by artist Nancy VanDevender)

In 2010, American Style Magazine ranked Atlanta as the ninth-best city for the arts. The renowned High Museum of Art is arguably the South's leading art museum and among the 100 most-visited art museums in the world. Other art institutions include the Museum of Design Atlanta (MODA), the Atlanta Contemporary Art Center, the Museum of Contemporary Art of Georgia, and the Michael C. Carlos Museum at Emory, containing the largest collection of ancient art in the Southeast.

=== Public art ===
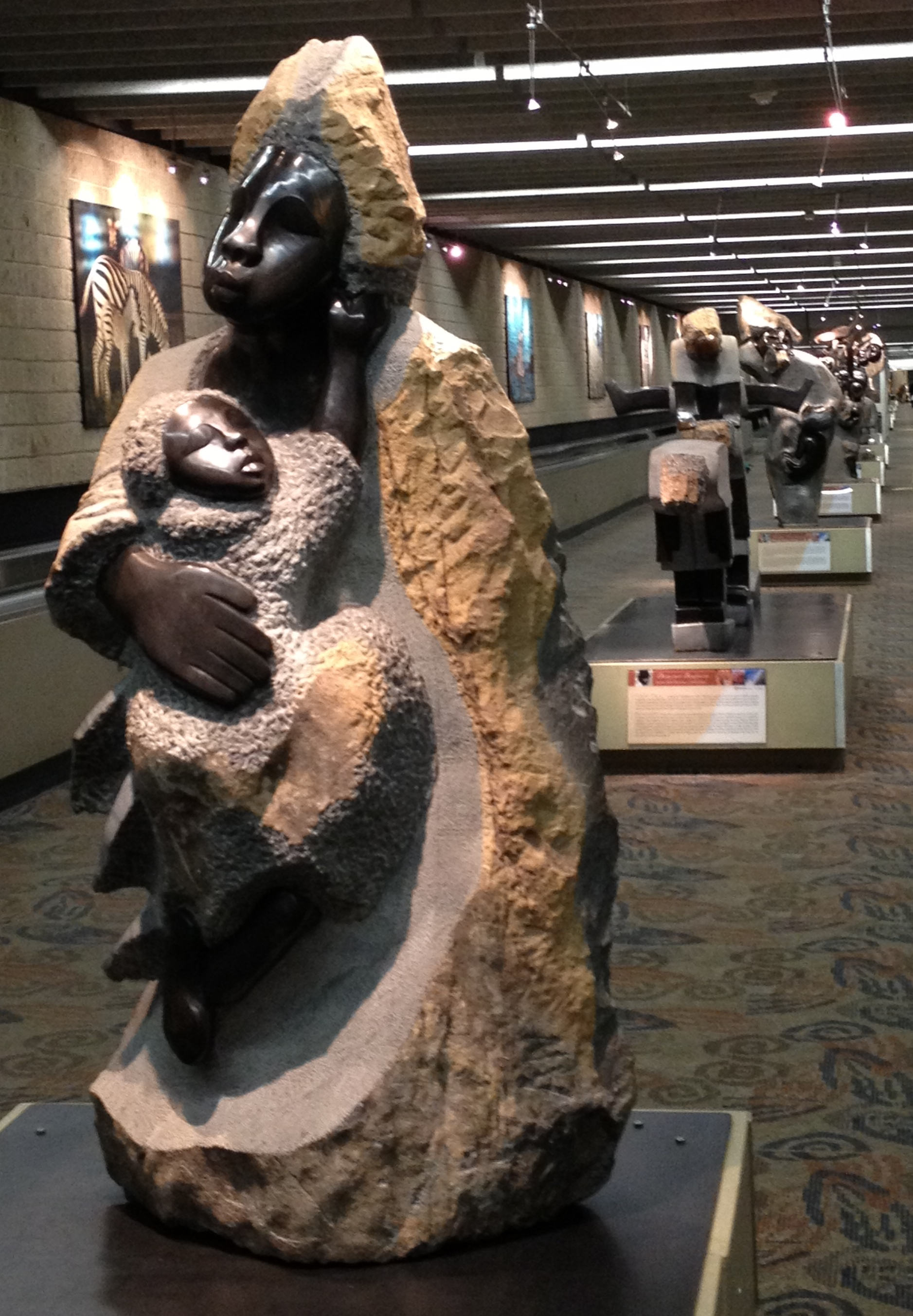
Zimbabwe sculpture: a tradition in stone at Atlanta airport between courses T and A

The city's Office of Cultural Affairs administers a public art program, which include works such as Atlanta from the Ashes (The Phoenix), and Thornton Dial's The Bridge at John Lewis plaza in Freedom Park. The office also sponsors temporary exhibitions of art in public spaces such as "Elevate" in 2011. The Metropolitan Public Art Coalition also promotes public art in the city and stages occasional exhibitions.

The city's Aviation Arts program administers and art program at Atlanta's airport, including Zimbabwe Sculpture: a Tradition in Stone and the Deborah Whitehouse mural Spirit of Atlanta, which welcomes passengers as they arrive at baggage claim from the peoplemover.

The 22 miles (35 km) BeltLine corridor, a former rail corridor gradually being developed into an improved biking and walking trail, is home to the annual Art on the BeltLine exhibition. In 2011 66 visual and performance pieces were exhibited.

=== Street art ===
Although historically never a haven for street art like New York City or Los Angeles, street art is becoming more prominent in Atlanta. Hotspots for viewing Atlanta street art include:

- The Krog Street Tunnel
- The 22-mile BeltLine path which circles the inner city along industrial and residential spaces
- In Cabbagetown, Atlanta along Tennelle St and the Wylie Street wall of the CSX railroad's Hulsey rail yard.
- In Inman Park around the intersection of Krog St. and Edgewood Ave.
- In East Atlanta surrounding the intersections of Flat Shoals Road and Edgewood Ave.
- In Little Five Points surrounding the intersections of Euclid Ave. and Moreland Ave.
- In Sweet Auburn along Edgewood Ave.

Images and locations of over 200 works of Atlanta Street Art can be found on the Atlanta Street Art Map. In 2011 the city hosted the Living Walls street art conference and will co-host it with Albany, New York in 2012.

In May 2011 Atlanta established a Graffiti Task Force. Though in October 2011 the police arrested 7 persons designated as vandals, city officials assert that they have no intention of stifling the street art scene. The city's Office of Cultural Affairs selected 29 standout murals to avoid whitewashing including murals commissioned as part of the BeltLine, works created during the Living Walls conferences, but not the most famous street art space in the city, the Krog Street Tunnel. Many street artists and members of the arts community interviewed by Creative Loafing believe the city's efforts are misdirected or futile.

=== Arts centers ===
Arts centers in Atlanta include King Plow Arts Center and the Goat Farm Arts Center in West Midtown, The Metropolitan in Adair Park and Studioplex in the Old Fourth Ward neighborhood.

=== Galleries and art walks ===
There are small concentrations of galleries in the intown neighborhoods, including but not limited to Castleberry Hill, Buckhead, the Westside Arts District in West Midtown, at Studioplex in Old Fourth Ward, and along Ponce de Leon Avenue in Poncey-Highland. Each of those areas sponsors an art walk, usually monthly.

== Theater ==
Atlanta is one of few United States cities with permanent, professional, resident companies in all major performing arts disciplines: opera (Atlanta Opera), ballet (Atlanta Ballet), music (Atlanta Symphony Orchestra), and theater (the Alliance Theatre). Atlanta also attracts many touring Broadway acts, concerts, shows, and exhibitions catering to a variety of interests. Atlanta's performing arts district is concentrated in Midtown Atlanta at the Woodruff Arts Center, which is home to the Atlanta Symphony Orchestra and the Alliance Theatre. The city also frequently hosts touring Broadway acts, especially at the Fox Theatre, a historic landmark that is among the highest grossing theaters in of its size.

Other theater groups include the internationally known Center for Puppetry Arts, Theatrical Outfit, Seven Stages Theater, Horizon Theater Company, improv group Dad's Garage, Actor's Express, the Shakespeare Tavern, and True Colors Theatre. Theater companies in metro Atlanta include the Georgia Ensemble Theatre and Conservatory in Roswell, Onstage Atlanta in Decatur, the Academy Theater in Avondale Estates, Performing Arts North in Alpharetta, Theatre in the Square and the Children's Garden Theater in Marietta, and Act 3 Productions in Sandy Springs. The Suzi Bass Awards and the Metropolitan Atlanta Theater Awards are two annual ceremonies honoring outstanding achievements in local theater. The Atlanta Radio Theatre Company preserves, promotes, performs, and educates people about the art of audio theater (radio drama).

== Performing arts and music venues ==
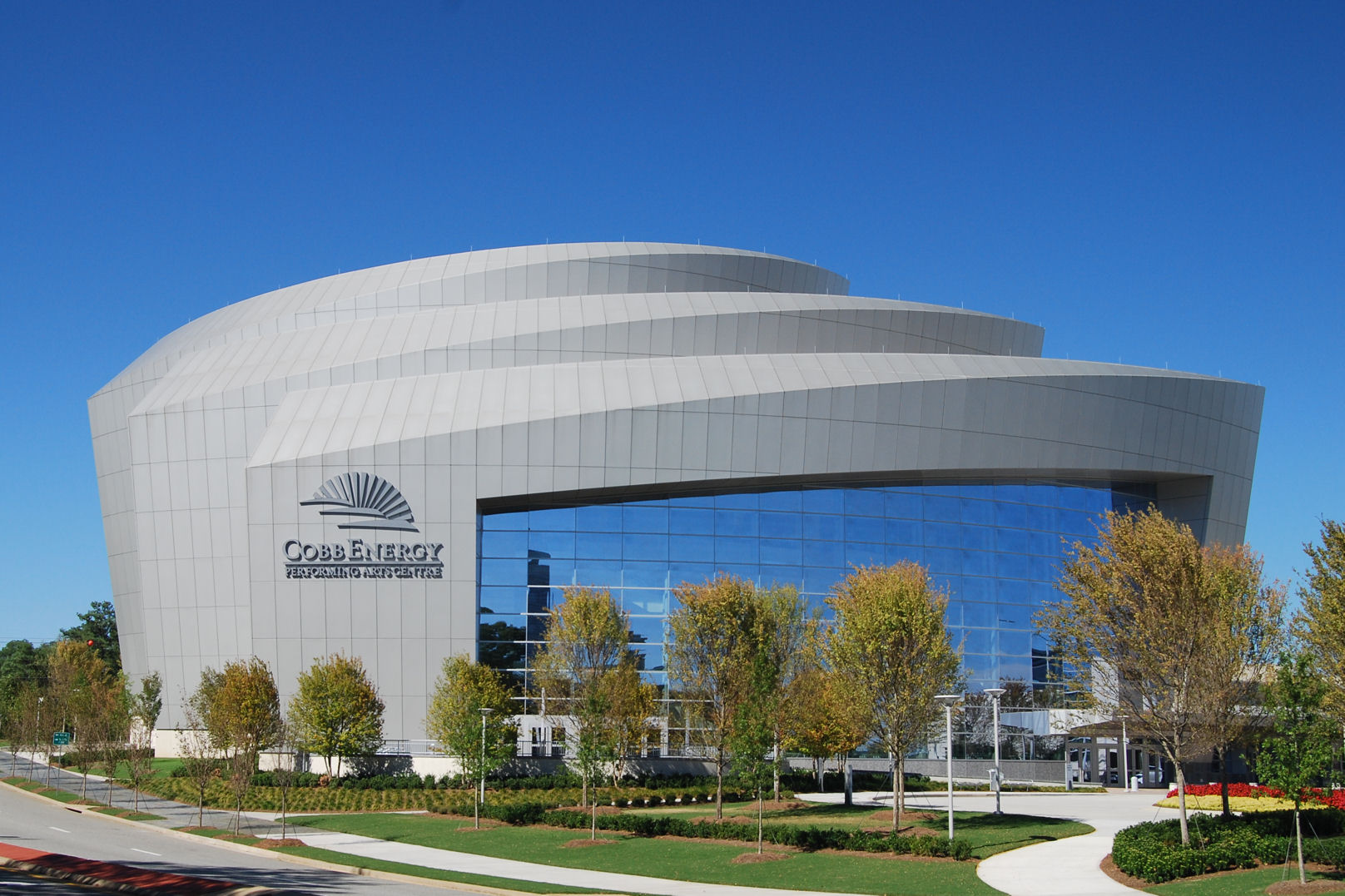
Cobb Energy Performing Arts Centre

In the city of Atlanta:

- Woodruff Arts Center - contains the Alliance Theatre, Atlanta Symphony Orchestra, High Museum of Art, Young Audiences and the 14th Street Playhouse
- Fox Theatre - theater, musical theater, concerts, award ceremonies and other special events
- Rialto Center for the Arts - performing arts
- Buckhead Theatre
- The Tabernacle
- Variety Playhouse and Seven Stages Theater
- The Masquerade - live music, mostly indie-rock, rock, metal
- Schwartz Center
- Ferst Center
- Ray Charles Performing Center

In Metro Atlanta, the Cobb Energy Performing Arts Centre and Gwinnett Center's performing arts center are prominent venues. Regional centers featuring a mix of the arts include the Elm Street Cultural Arts Village in Woodstock and the Jaqueline Casey Hudgens Center for the Arts (adjacent to Gwinnett Center) in Duluth.

== Literature ==
Atlanta is the home of many influential writers of the 20th century, including Margaret Mitchell, author of Gone With the Wind, one of the best-selling books of all time; Alice Walker, author of Pulitzer Prize-winning and critically acclaimed novel The Color Purple; Alfred Uhry, playwright of Driving Miss Daisy, which deals with Jewish residents of Atlanta in the early 20th century; and Joel Chandler Harris, author of the Brer Rabbit children's stories. Famous journalists include Ralph McGill, the anti-segregationist editor and publisher of the Atlanta Constitution newspaper. Atlanta is also the home of contemporary editorial cartoonist Mike Luckovich, who is syndicated nationally to 150 newspapers.

=== Film festivals ===
Atlanta is the host of the Atlanta Film Festival, an Academy Award qualifying, international film festival held every April and showcasing a diverse range of independent films, including genre films such as horror and sci-fi. Other film festivals include the Atlanta Jewish Film Festival, Black Film Festival Atlanta, Peachtree Village International Film Festival, Atlanta Asian Film Festival, the Out on Film gay film festival, Independent Film Month, Atlanta Film Festival 365, Atlanta Underground Film Festival, Atlanta International Documentary Film Festival, and the Buried Alive horror film fest.

== Marching arts ==
Atlanta is a major hub for the marching arts. The city is home of Spirit of Atlanta Drum and Bugle Corps, which competes in Drum Corps International, and the Alliance Drum and Bugle Corps (inactive) and CorpsVets Drum and Bugle Corps, both of which participate in the Drum Corps Associates circuit. Atlanta is also home to the Honda Battle of the Bands which is the most popular collegiate marching arts event in the nation.
