= Tiny Doors ATL =

Tiny Doors ATL is a public art installation throughout metro Atlanta, based in culturally significant locations within the city. Artist Karen Singer began the project in 2014 as a way to create community through public art. The project has grown to over 30 installations, with most installations open to the general public for free, outdoor viewing. The artist known as Tiny Doors ATL is Karen Singer, the mind and artist behind the project. She holds a degree in Visual Art from Rutgers University. Singer created Tiny Doors ATL in 2014 and has regularly updated and expanded the art installation in the more than 10 years since its birth. Tiny Doors ATL was created as a form of public art designed to build community. Numbered doors are open and free to the public at all times. The official Tiny Doors ATL website includes an interactive map linked to door locations for ease of access.

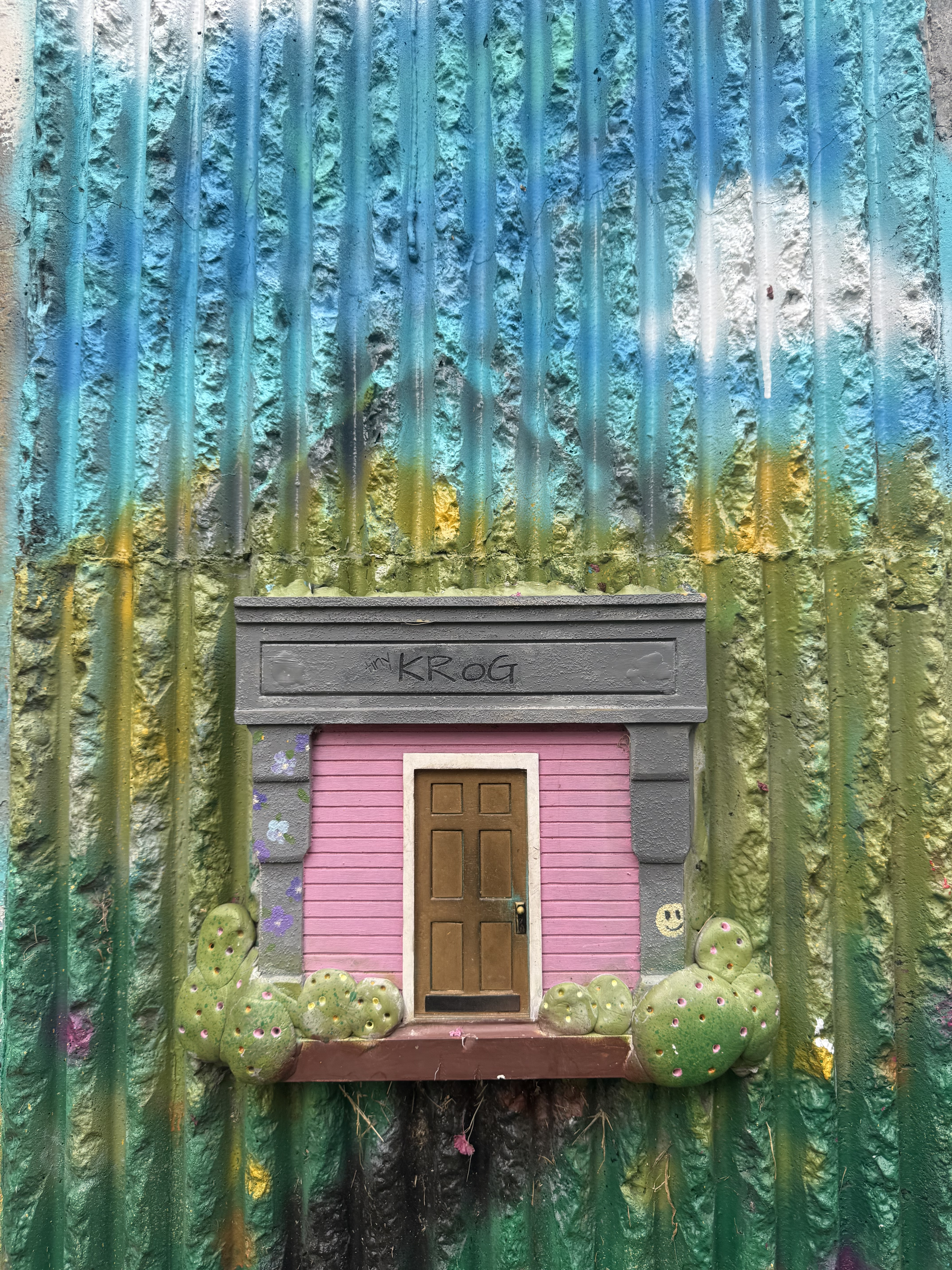
Krog Street location of Tiny Doors ATL art installation.

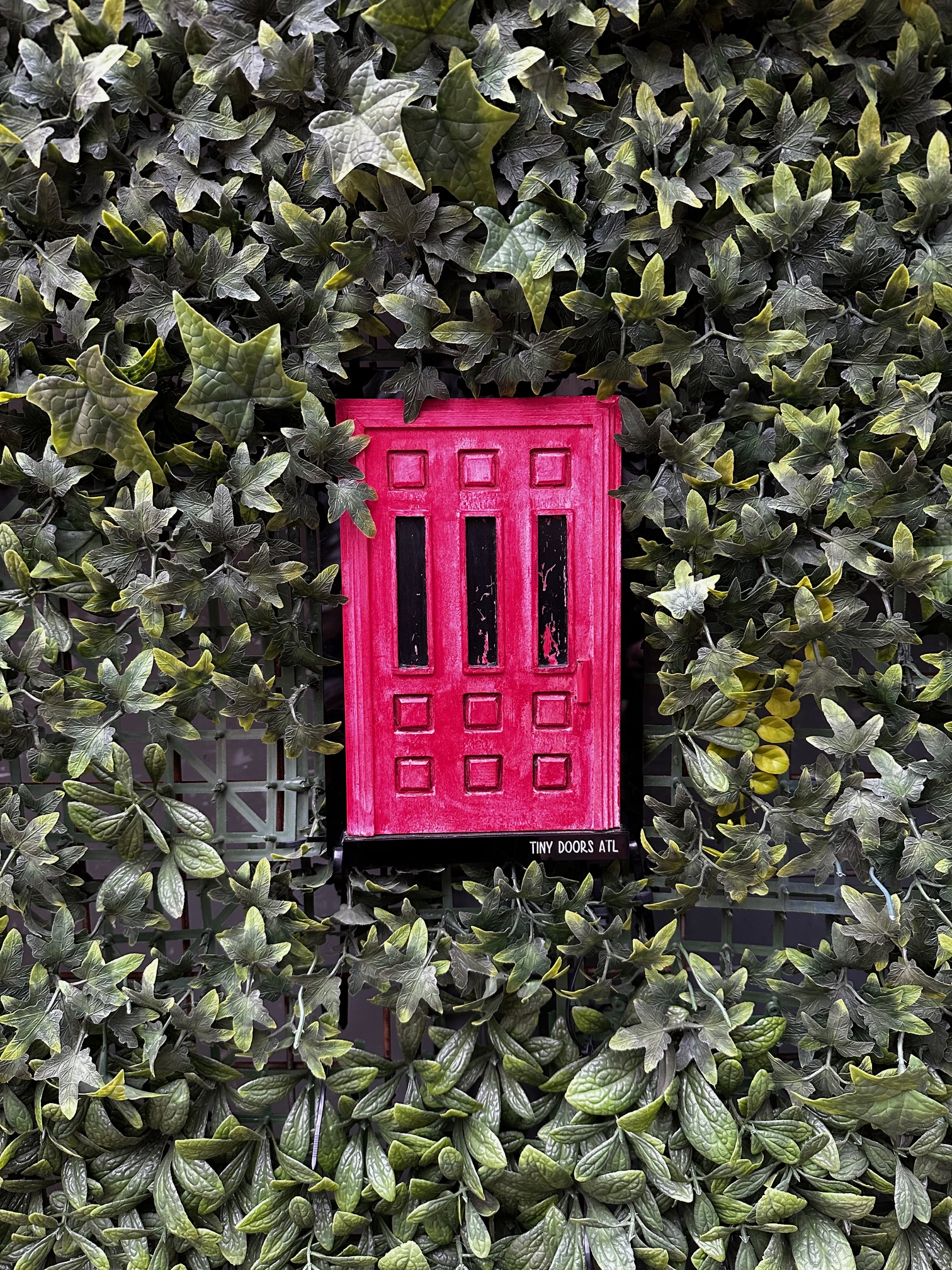
Atlantic Station second location of Tiny Doors ATL art installation.

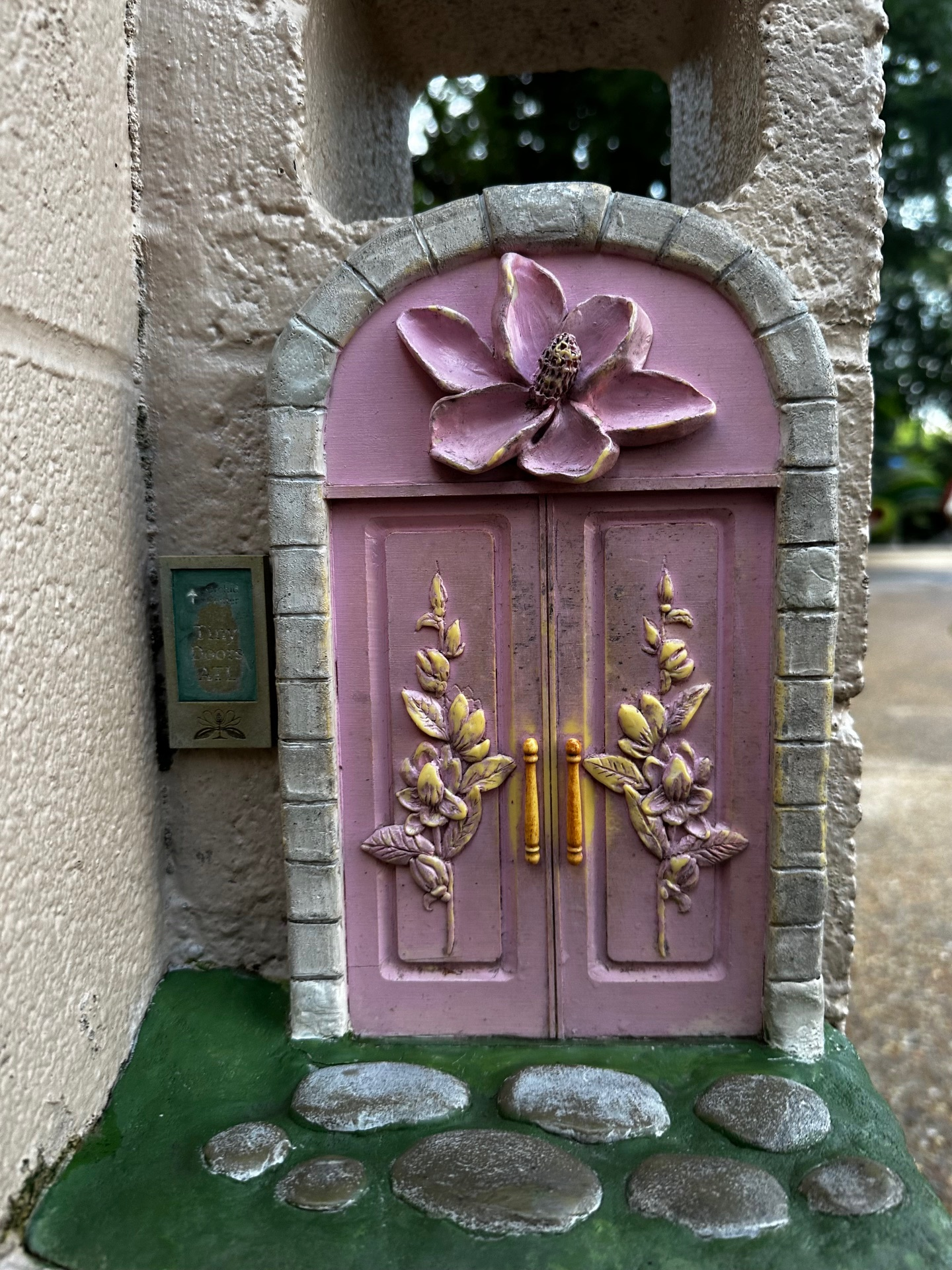
Atlanta Botanical Garden location of Tiny Doors ATL art installation.

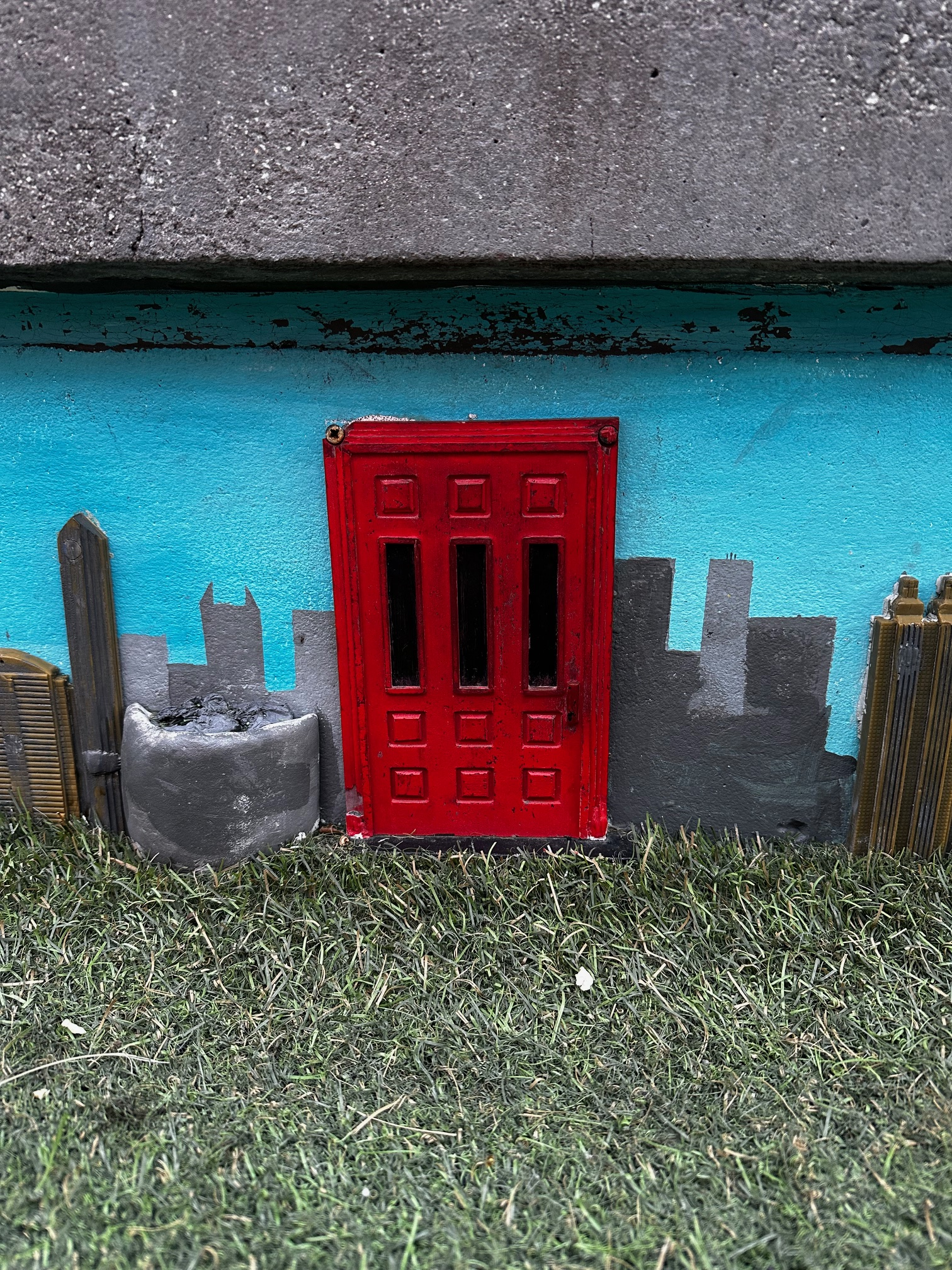
Atlantic Station first location of Tiny Doors ATL art installation.

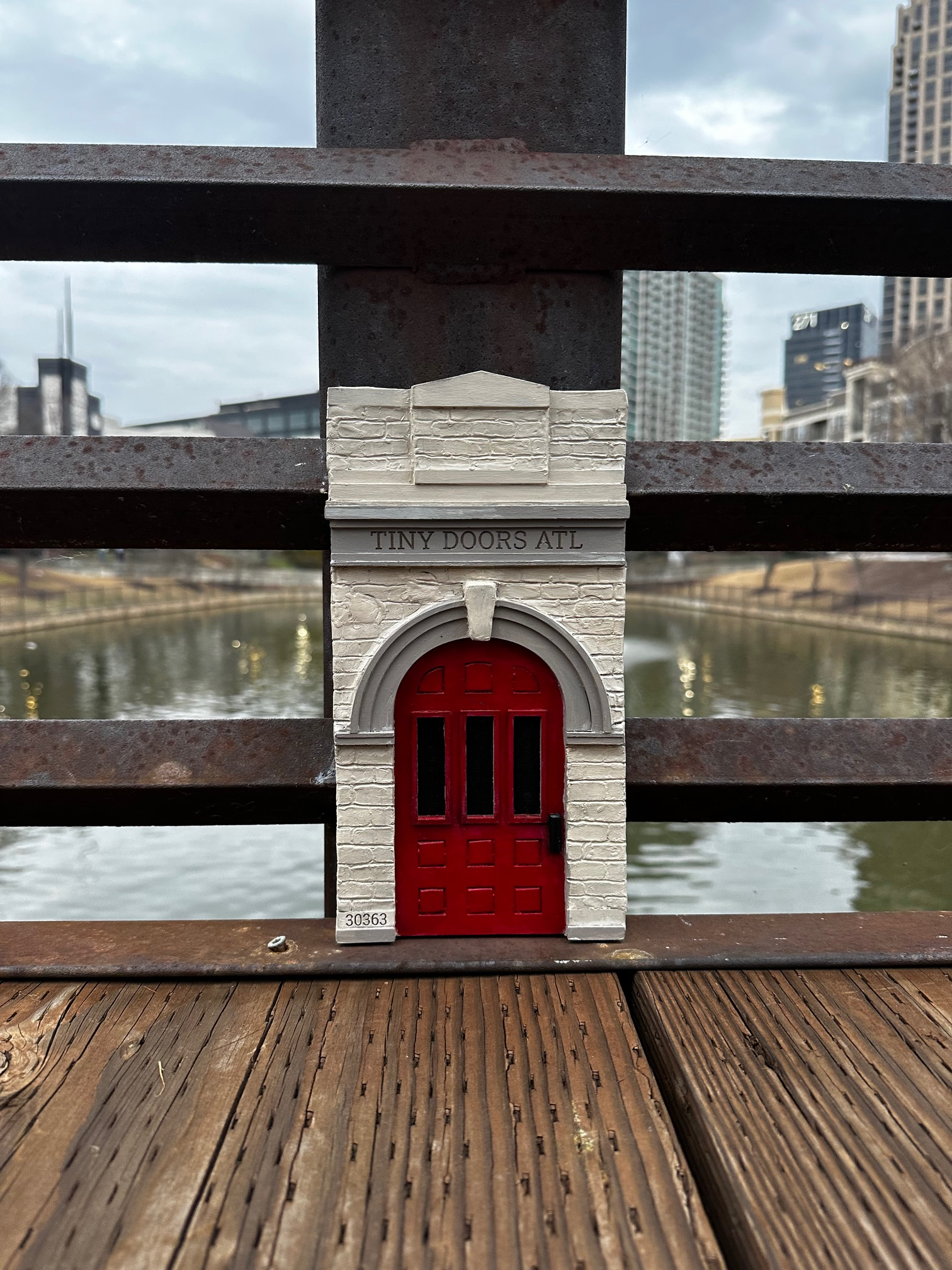
Eclipse Pond Bridge location of Tiny Doors ATL art installation.

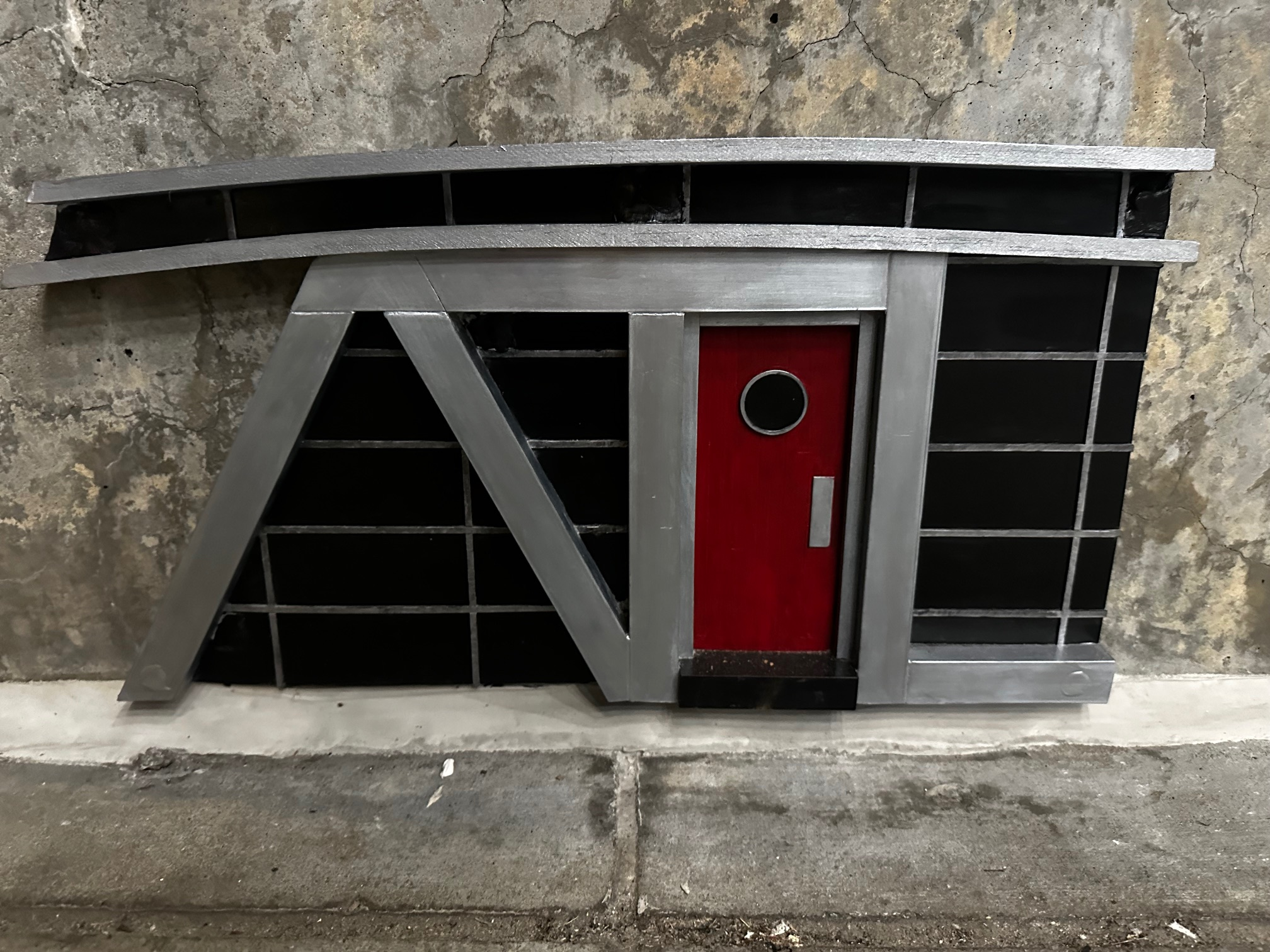
State Farm Arena location of Tiny Doors ATL art installation.

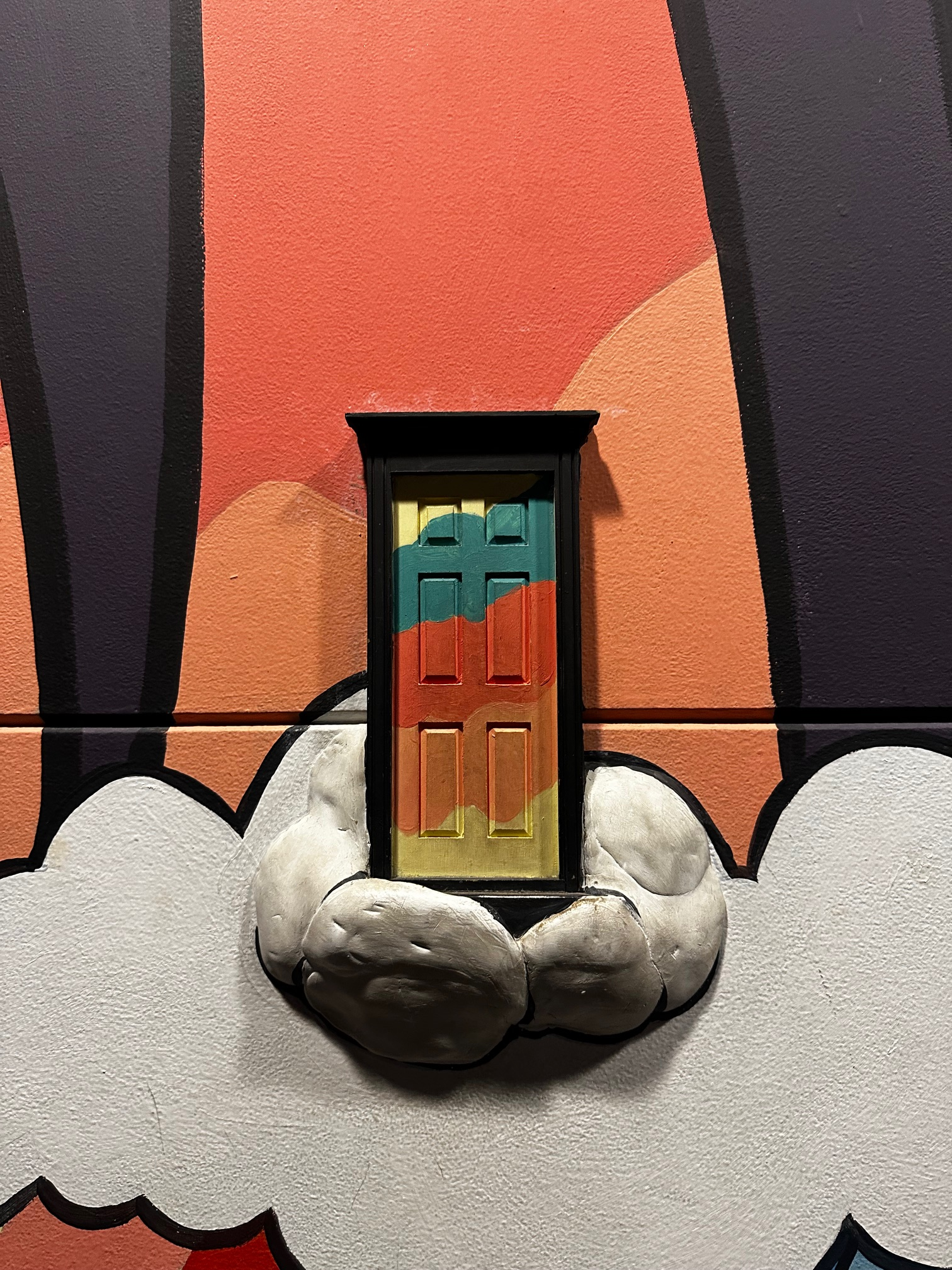
Centennial Olympic Park location of Tiny Doors ATL art installation.

== The Artist ==
Karen Anderson Singer created the Tiny Doors ATL project in 2014, one year after moving to Atlanta. After growing up in Ann Arbor, Michigan, she joined a punk band, where she found a love of art while on the road. She later earned a degree in Visual Art from Rutgers University, and moved to Atlanta after graduation. Singer created Tiny Doors ATL to be a space for community and growth through artwork, and was granted a Tiny Key to the City of Atlanta for her public art from Representative Natalyn Archibong.

== The Project ==
Created in 2014, Tiny Doors ATL consist of over 30 7-inch decorative doors placed throughout the metro-Atlanta area. Each door is handcrafted to match the neighborhood they reside in, and artist Karen Singer spends between 50 and 60 hours on each one. Singer says that each door is designed to reflect the spirit of its location and foster community through artwork. Each piece is specifically requested or commissioned based on local residents and businesses. Over the years, Tiny Doors ATL has amassed countless fans and garnered the attention of major brands such as Coca-Cola and Fox Theatre. The official Instagram of Tiny Doors ATL boasts 117,000 Instagram followers as of March 2026.

== Empirical Details ==
Tiny Doors ATL are 7-inch tall art installations depicting miniature doors. They typically contain the Tiny Doors ATL tag or signature somewhere on the piece, and implement the environmental surroundings of their individual locations. All Tiny Doors ATL are located outside for easy, free public access, excluding non-numbered doors. Non-numbered doors, also known as "side quests" on the brand website, are commissions located within businesses that may require payment for entry or have restricted hours.

== Locations ==
There are 29 numbered Tiny Doors ATL and 5 non-numbered ("side quest") doors as of March 2026. They are as follows:

Numbered doors

Door #01 Krog Street Tunnel

Door #02 Old Fourth Ward Skatepark on the Belt Line

Door #03 Inman Park Pet Works

Door #04 Little Shop of Stories

Door #05 Stumpery Garden

Door #06 Eastside Trail

Door #07 7 Stages Theater

Door #08 Milltown Arms Tavern

Door #09 King of Parks

Door #10E Grant Park Tree Door

Door #10W Grant Park

Door #11 Center for Puppetry Arts

Door #12 Westside Trail

Door #13 Piedmont Plaza

Door #14 East Atlanta Village Farmers Market

Door #15 Fox Theatre

Door #16 State Farm Arena

Door #17 Woodruff Park

Door #18 Atlanta Symphony Orchestra

Door #19 Tiny Door Street

Door #20 Kirkwood

Door #21 Atlantic Station

Door #22 Atlantic Station

Door #23 Jackson Street Bridge

Door #24 Habitat for Humanity ReStore

Door #25 Eclipse Pond Bridge

Door #26 Trap Music Museum

Door #28 Atlanta Humane Society

Door #39 Carter Center

Non-numbered Doors

- Fernbank
- Centennial Olympic Park
- Atlanta Botanical Garden
- Swan House Door: Atlanta History Center
- Georgia Aquarium

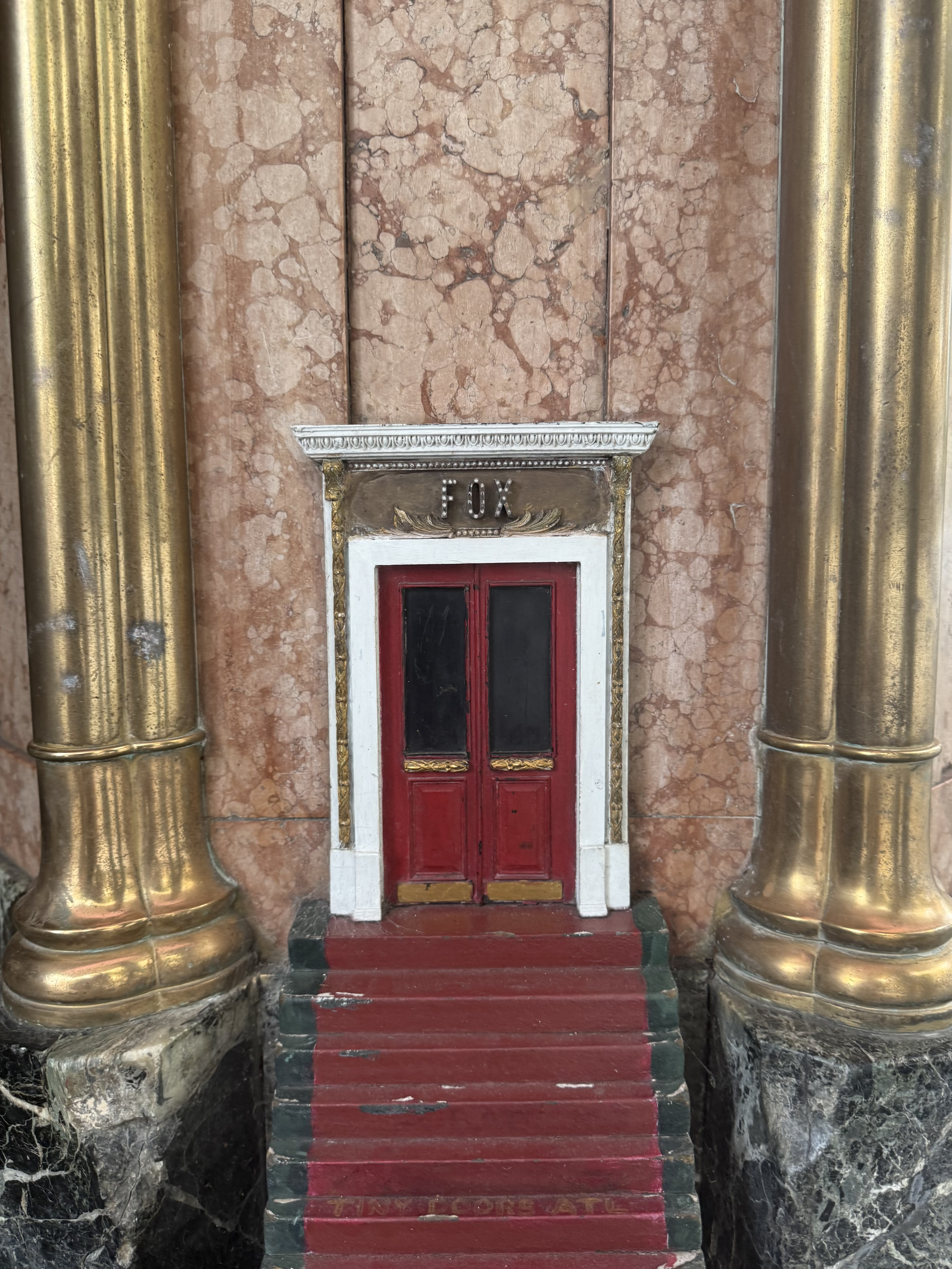
Fox Theater location of TinyDoorsATL art installation.
