= Living wall =

Living wall may refer to:

- Living Wall, a Croatian political party
- Living wall, alternative name for a green wall, a wall on which vegetation is grown
- Living Walls, an annual conference on street art
- Living wall (Dungeons & Dragons), a fictional monster from Dungeons & Dragons
