= Alex Brewer (artist) =

American painter

Alex Brewer, also known as HENSE, is an American contemporary artist, best known for his dynamic, vivid and colorful abstract paintings and monumental wall pieces. He has been active since the 1990s. In 2002 he began accepting commissions for artwork and over the course of the last decade has established a solid reputation as a commissioned artist, having appeared in several solo and group shows.

Although part of the legitimate art world for a decade, he is not apologetic about his years spent as a graffiti artist, as he feels this informs his current work.

== Early life ==
Brewer was born and raised in Atlanta. He began doing graffiti at the age of 13 under the name HENSE and was so prolific at it that he earned what graffiti artists call “all-city status” by having left tags in practically every neighborhood in the city.

Brewer graduated from Grady High School in Atlanta. He attended Virginia Commonwealth University in Richmond for a semester, but dropped out to pursue his calling as a graffiti artist.

== Career ==
=== Grounding in Graffiti ===
Brewer developed his skill for graffiti in the mid to late '90s and early 2000s. At this time the city had a handful of “legal walls”, such as the Civic Yard at Peachtree and Pine streets, where graffiti artists could display their work. However, in 2003 Atlanta passed an anti-graffiti ordinance that made it illegal to paint private murals on public property without approval from the city.

=== Artwork ===
Brewer has produced a number of interior and exterior works around the world for both public institutions and private companies.

HENSE is most renowned for his abstract mural, “Building Blocks (aka “The Mural of Unusual Size,” May 2017), which spans the length of three old industrial buildings on West Baltimore Street in downtown Hagerstown, Maryland. His largest installation to date is The ISIL Institute in Lima, Peru amassing a size of 40 meters (137 feet) tall and 50 meters (170 feet) wide. The PUBLIC 2015/Northam Silos, a site-specific mural installation on the CBH Group grain silos, curated by FORM and funded by FORM and the CBH Group in Northam, Western Australia measures 36 meters (118 feet) tall and 11 meters (36 feet) wide. At Icon Midtown, Atlanta’s tallest new tower in a decade (as of 2018), the muralist HENSE has completed an untitled piece that measures 86 feet tall and 65 feet wide.

One of Brewer's stated highest honors was a commission by the High Museum of Art in Atlanta to produce a site-specific installation as part of the museum's summer exhibition, Drawing Inside the Perimeter. He also created two original installations at the Museum of Design Atlanta (MODA), for the Skate It or Hang It?! Exhibition, which illustrate the impact that skateboarding art has made on his work.

In addition, he has commissioned work at Apple Inc, including a site-specific mural commissioned for new retail store barricade, along with artwork created for limited edition products, commissioned by Apple Inc, in Miami, Florida. He also has work at Facebook Inc, including a site-specific mural commissioned for Facebook Global Headquarters, in a building designed by Frank Gehry, commissioned by Facebook Inc, in Menlo Park, California. In addition to several works at companies including Aol, B2 Studios (Alton Brown's test kitchen and studio), Big Nerd Ranch, Hilton Hotels, King & Spalding, DLA Piper, Novartis, Tuner Broadcasting's Adult Swim, Cartoon Network, and PRPL Digital Creative Agency.

== Legal issues ==
On April 1, 2011, Brewer and several other local Atlanta graffiti artists were sued for $1 million by a pair of Edgewood Avenue property owners. Brewer and several legitimate artists have countersued saying they had nothing to do with the work that they are being sued for. Another article describes the shift as ironic: "the same people the city had once paid officers to lock up were now receiving commissions from city coffers."

== Style ==
Brewer’s free-form paintings and public mural installations use a combination of abstract lines, shapes and organic forms. His work has been described as fluid and playful and as an explosion of pastels.

Michael Rooks, the curator of modern and contemporary art at the High Museum of Art in Atlanta, said: "HENSE combines the quick pace and point-of-view of street culture with tumultuous compositions often characterized by highly keyed color, vertiginous line and biomorphic shapes."

"The artist thinks of his recent works on panel as a form of collage, in which, as he describes, he adds and subtracts different forms until the work feels finished. The results could be described as an elegantly choreographed cacophony, in which loosely geometric forms jostle one another and, in some of his paintings, rub up against kaleidoscopic patches of pigment. At their generous size, these works engulf viewers, sweeping us up in their visual rhythms—in which you just might detect the pulse of the street."

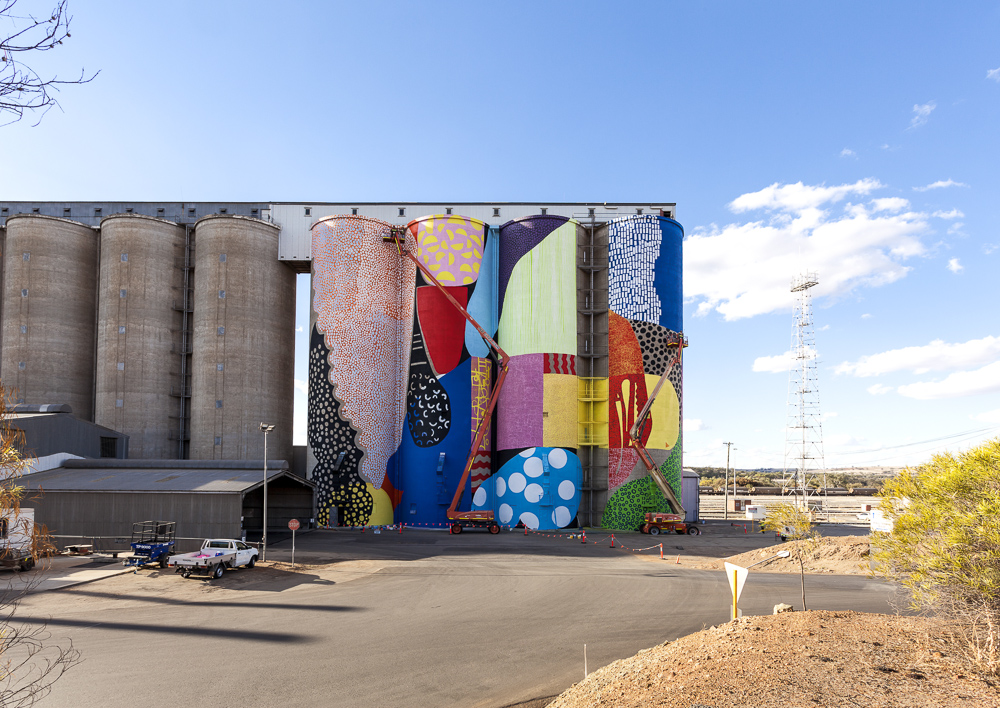
Grain Silos, Northam Australia

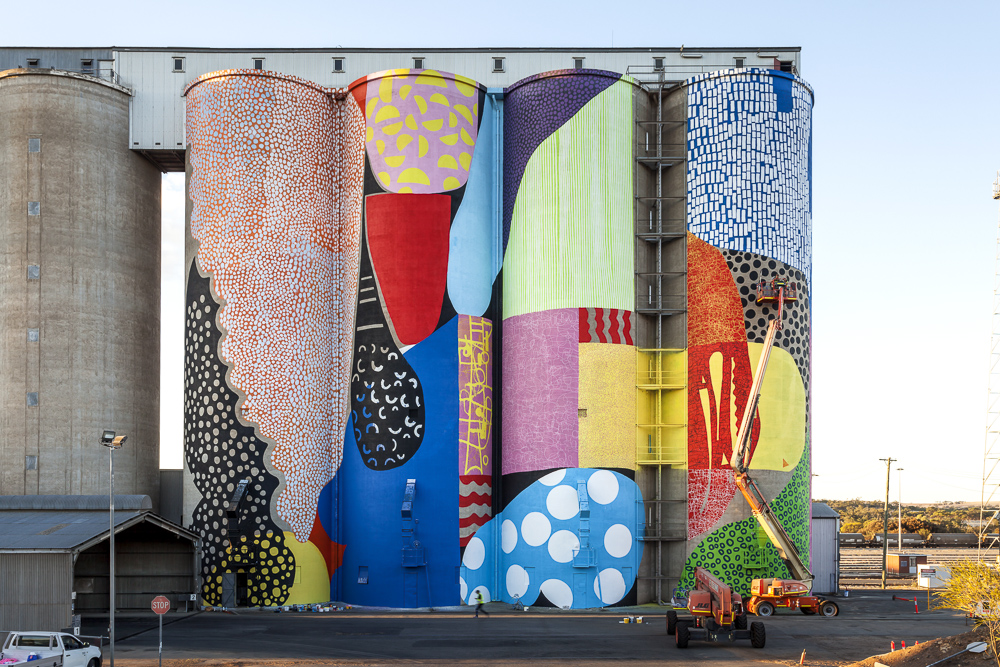
Grain Silos, Northam Australia

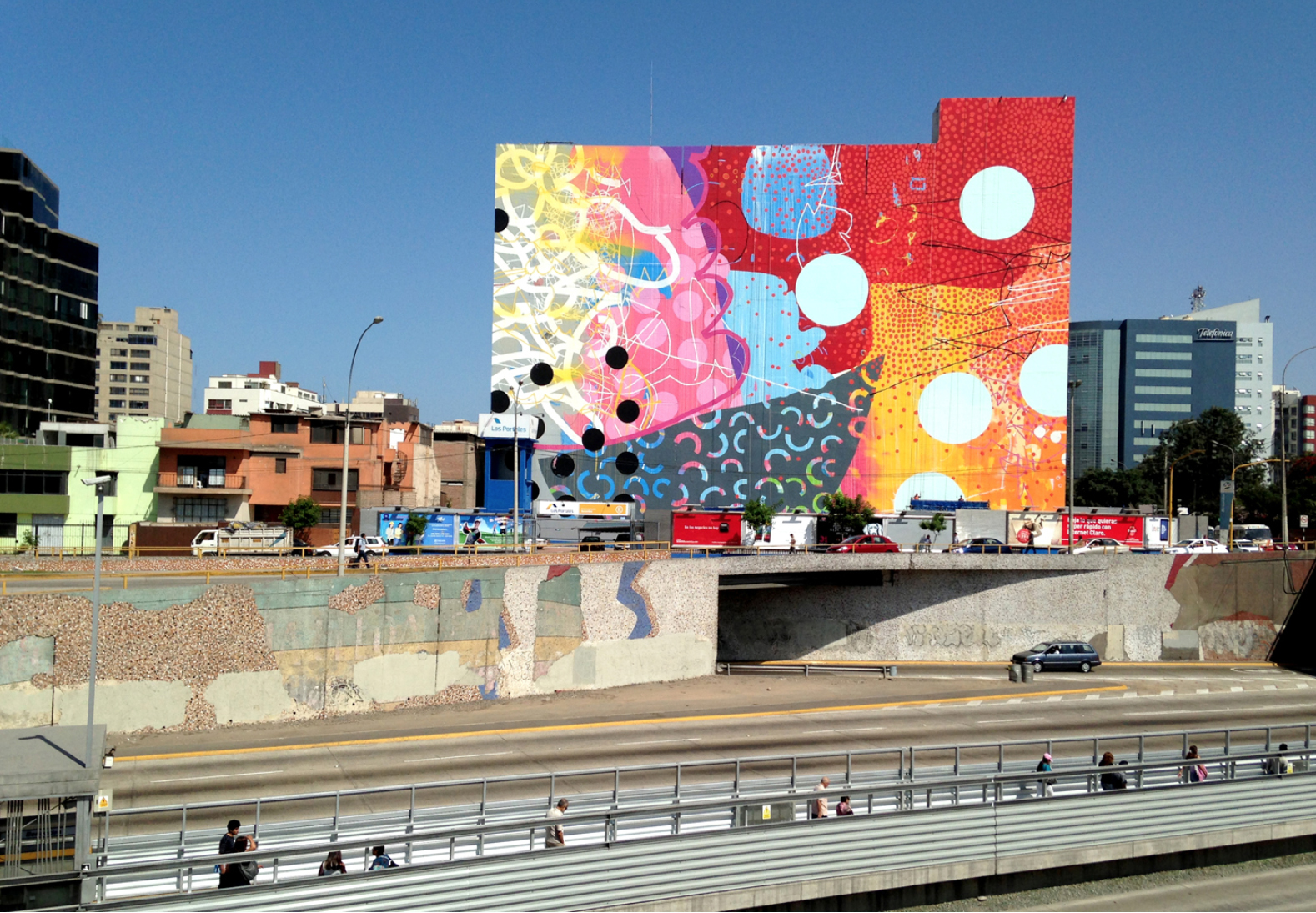
AlexBrewer HENSE Commissioned Public Mural in Lima Peru 2013

== Solo exhibitions ==
- 2017 Color, Balance & Form, Washington County Museum of Fine Arts, Hagerstown, MD.
- 2016 CUT, Sandler Hudson Gallery, Atlanta, GA.
- 2015 Library Street Collective, HENSE, November, Detroit, MI.
- 2014 INTERIOR/EXTERIOR, Wiregrass Museum of Art, Dothan, AL.
- 2014 HENSE: Drawings, Paintings and Shapes, Reynolds Gallery, Richmond, VA.
- 2013 HENSE: Prints and Paintings, Sandler Hudson Gallery, Atlanta, GA.
- 2013 HENSE: New Paintings, Maxwell Colette Gallery, Chicago, IL.
- 2012 SPRAY, Sandler Hudson Gallery, Atlanta, GA.
- 2009 Surface Strength, The Rail Yard, Atlanta, GA.
- 2008 Soft Light, Sandler Hudson Gallery, Atlanta, GA.
- 2005 12' x 6", Mason Murer Fine Art, Atlanta, GA.
- 2005 New Works on Paper, Octane, Atlanta, GA.

== Group exhibitions ==
- 2016 Abstraction Today, Museum of Contemporary Art of Georgia, Atlanta, GA.
- 2015 Vivid Bunch, Die Kunstagentin, Cologne, Germany.
- 2014 Art Basel, Library Street Collective Gallery, Goldman Properties, Wynwood Arts District, Miami, FL.
- 2014 Abstract, BC Gallery, Berlin, Germany.
- 2014 The Shape of a Pocket, Sandler Hudson Gallery, Atlanta, GA.
- 2014 Intuitionists, The Drawing Center, New York, NY.
- 2013 Exhibit Z, Library Street Collective Gallery, Detroit, MI.
- 2013 Graffiti Mash Up, Fay Gold Gallery, Atlanta, GA.
- 2013 Drawing Inside the Perimeter, Site-specific installation, High Museum of Art, Atlanta, GA.
- 2013 Graffuturism, Open Space Gallery, Paris, France.
- 2012 Skate it or Hang it, Museum of Design Atlanta MODA, Atlanta, GA.
- 2012 Off the Edge, Rialto Center For The Arts, Georgia State University, Atlanta, GA, Curated by Karen Comer Lowe.
- 2011 Art on the BeltLine, Exhibition of exterior public works along the BeltLine corridor, Atlanta, GA.
- 2011 Summer Group Show, Circa Gallery, Minneapolis, MN
- 2011 Hambidge Art Auction, Bradford Gallery, Atlanta, GA. Curated by Ben Goldman and Jenny Minkewicz.
- 2011 Mark Making In Black And White, Sandler Hudson Gallery, Atlanta, GA.
- 2010 Art on the BeltLine, Exhibition of exterior public works along the BeltLine corridor, Atlanta, GA.
- 2009 Freedom, Known Gallery, Los Angeles, CA.
- 2009 New Paintings, Lawrence Savage Gallery, Miami, FL.
- 2007 Experimental Prints on Paper, Beep Beep Gallery, Atlanta, GA.
- 2007 Hambidge Art Auction, Puritan Mill, Atlanta, GA, Curated by Comer Art Advisory.
- 2007 Royal Elastics & The Seventh Letter Crew present “Letters First”, Curated by Known Gallery, Bread & Butter Tradeshow, Barcelona, Spain.
- 2007 New Paintings, Function, Decatur, GA.
- 2007 Drawing Outside The Lines, Rialto Center For The Arts, Georgia State University, Atlanta, GA, Curated by Comer Art Advisory.
- 2007 Drawings, Sandler Hudson Gallery, Atlanta, GA.
- 2006 Lights Out, Scion Dashboard Gallery, San Francisco, CA.
- 2006 Avidica, Compound, Atlanta, GA.
- 2005 Letters First Traveling Group Exhibition, RBK Concept Store - Beverly Hills, Los Angeles, CA - Tokyo, Japan - Taipei, Taiwan.
- 2005 Writers vs. Riders, Upper Playground Gallery, San Francisco, CA.
- 2005 Another Witty Remark, The Canvas Gallery, San Francisco, CA.
- 2005 Environmentalists, Mason Murer Fine Art, Atlanta, GA.
- 2004 Blurry, Retromodern, Atlanta, GA.
- 2003 Dome Piece, Objex Art Space, Miami, FL.
- 2003 A Collective Effort, The Forum, Atlanta, GA.
- 2003 Krylon and Beyond II, YoungBlood Gallery, Atlanta, GA.
- 2002 Mixed Media Installation, 55DSL, Diesel Store, Union Square, New York, NY.
- 2002 Krylon and Beyond, YoungBlood Gallery, Atlanta, GA

== Commissions ==
- 2017 ICON Midtown, commissioned by the Related Group, Atlanta, GA.
- 2017 Building Blocks, Cultural Trail Mural, commissioned by the City of Hagerstown, Hagerstown, MD.
- 2016 Tuscawilla Park, Site-specific mural, commissioned by the Appleton Museum of Art and City of Ocala, Ocala, FL.
- 2016 PUBLIC 2016, Curtin University, commissioned and curated by FORM, Perth, Western Australia.
- 2015 Very Fun Park, Site-specific mural, commissioned by Fubon Art Foundation, Taipei, Taiwan.
- 2015 Glass Wheel Studios, Site-specific mural commissioned for the Neon District of Norfolk, Virginia
- 2015 PUBLIC 2015/Northam Silos, Site-specific mural installation on the CBH Group grain silos, curated by FORM, funded by FORM and CBH Group, Northam, Western Australia.
- 2015 Apple Inc, Site-specific mural commissioned for new retail store barricade, original artwork created for limited edition products, commissioned by Apple Inc, Miami, FL.
- 2015 Facebook Inc, Site-specific mural commissioned for Facebook Global Headquarters, building designed by Frank Gehry, Commissioned by Facebook Inc, Menlo Park, CA.
- 2014 Wiregrass Museum of Art, INTERIOR/EXTERIOR, site-specific installations, commissioned by the Wiregrass Museum of Art, Dothan, AL.
- 2014 Madison Theater Building Mural, Detroit, Michigan. Commissioned by Bedrock Real Estate Services and curated by Library Street Collective Gallery.
- 2014 Commissioned public mural for Columbus State University and Uptown Columbus, Funded by the Community Foundation of the Chattahoochee Valley, Columbus, GA.
- 2013 Commissioned public murals for the Z Lot parking garage and retail space, Curated by Library Street Collective Gallery, Commissioned by Bedrock Real Estate Services, Detroit, MI.
- 2013 Public mural, commissioned by Property Adventures, Chicago, IL.
- 2013 Site-specific installation, RVA Fest, Commissioned by Venture Richmond, Richmond, Virginia.
- 2013 Three commissioned interior walls and one exterior work on wood for B2 Studios, Alton Brown’s new test kitchen and studio, Commissioned by BoxTree Designs and B2 Studios, Atlanta, Ga.
- 2013 Site-specific interior wall murals, Novartis Corporate Headquarters, Commissioned by Novartis Corporation, East Hanover, New Jersey.
- 2013 High Museum of Art, Wall Drawing 1, Site-specific installation, Acrylic on wall, Commissioned by the High Museum of Art, Atlanta, GA.
- 2013 Interior installation on wall for PRPL Digital Creative Agency, Orlando, FL, commissioned by PRPL Creative Agency.
- 2013 ISIL Institute, Commissioned public mural, Lima, Peru, Sponsored by ISIL Institute Miraflores.
- 2013 Westside Cultural Arts Center and Fay Gold Gallery, Full building exterior murals, Atlanta, GA, Sponsored by the WCAC.
- 2012 Elevate, Atlanta, GA, South Broad Mural Project, Sponsored by the City of Atlanta.
- 2012 700 Delaware, Washington DC, Public Mural, Private Commission.
- 2012 Virginia Museum of Contemporary Art, Interior mural installation, Virginia Beach, VA, Sponsored by MOCA VA.
- 2012 RVA public mural, Richmond, Virginia, sponsored by Venture Richmond.
- 2011 Atlanta BeltLine Mural, Atlanta, Georgia. Sponsored by Atlanta BeltLine Inc.
- 2011 Aol, Interior Murals, Orlando, FL, Sponsored by Aol.
- 2011 Shops Around Lenox, Atlanta, Georgia. Sponsored by Healey Weatherholtz Properties.
- 2010 Atlanta BeltLine Murals, Atlanta, Georgia. Sponsored by Atlanta BeltLine Inc.
- 2010 Artist Project (Public Mural), Oyster, Virginia. Sponsored by Sam Flax Art & Design and Avondale Arts Alliance.
- 2009 Hilton Hotels Corporate Collection, Atlanta, Georgia.
- 2009 Collaboration with Adult Swim and Kia Motors, Atlanta, Georgia. Sponsored by Kia Motors and Turner Broadcasting Systems.
- 2009 Cartoon Network, Atlanta, Georgia. Sponsored by Turner Broadcasting System.
- 2008 Ford Flex, Atlanta, Georgia. Sponsored by Ford Motor Company.
- 2006 Sprite Artist Series, Atlanta, Georgia. Sponsored by Coca-Cola.
- 2003 Scion Artist Series, Atlanta, Georgia. Sponsored by Toyota Motor Company.
- 2002 55DSL Store, Union Square, New York City. Sponsored by Frank Magazine and 55DSL.

== Public art projects ==
- 2017 Building Blocks, Cultural Trail Mural, Commissioned by the City of Hagerstown, Hagerstown, MD.
- 2016 Tuscawilla Park Mural Project, Commissioned by the Appleton Museum of Art and City of Ocala, Ocala, FL.
- 2016 PUBLIC 2016, Albany, Western Australia.
- 2015 City Leaks Contemporary Urban Art Festival, Cologne, Germany.
- 2015
- Very Fun Park, Curated and Commissioned by Fubon Art Foundation, Taipei, Taiwan.
- 2015 Glass Wheel Studios, Site-specific mural commissioned for the Neon District of Norfolk, Virginia
- 2015 PUBLIC 2015/Northam Silos, Site-specific mural installation on the CBH Group grain silos, curated by FORM, Northam, Western Australia.
- 2014 Site-specific public installations, INTERIOR/EXTERIOR, Wiregrass Museum of Art, Dothan, AL.
- 2014 Public mural, Madison Theater Building, Detroit, MI.
- 2014 Public mural, Living Walls: The City Speaks Conference, Atlanta, GA.
- 2014 Public mural, Atlanta BeltLine Public Art Program, Atlanta, GA.
- 2014 Public mural, Commissioned by the Community Foundation of the Chattahoochee Valley with the Art Beat Fund, Curated and organized by Columbus State University and Uptown Columbus, Columbus, GA
- 2013 LOVE, Sculpture installation, Virginia Museum of Fine Arts, Richmond, VA.
- 2013 Exterior site-specific installation on building, Commissioned by Venture Richmond, Richmond, Virginia.
- 2013 Public mural commissioned for ISIL Institute, funded by ISIL and realized through Morbo Gallery and ISIL, Lima, Peru.
- 2012 700 Delaware, Public Mural on Historic Church, Washington DC.
- 2012 South Broad Mural Project, City of Atlanta Office of Cultural Affairs, Atlanta, GA.
- 2012 RVA Public Mural, Canal Walk, Richmond, VA.
- 2012 Public murals created for the City of Atlanta’s permanent collection of public art, City of Atlanta Office of Cultural Affairs, Atlanta, GA.
- 2012 Public mural, Virginia Museum of Contemporary Art, Virginia Beach, VA.
- 2011 Public mural, Atlanta BeltLine Public Art Program, Atlanta, GA.
- 2011 Public murals, Shops Around Lenox, Atlanta, GA.
- 2010 Public murals, Atlanta BeltLine Public Art Program, Atlanta, GA.
- 2010 Public murals, Art Basel, Miami, FL.
- 2010 Public mural, Artist Project, Oyster, VA.
- 2009 Public mural, Atlanta Contemporary Art Center, Atlanta, GA.

== Grants and awards ==
- 2016 100 Most Influential Georgians, Georgia Trend Magazine, January 2016, Atlanta, GA.
- 2014 Project Grant (Public Mural), Atlanta BeltLine Inc, Atlanta, GA, Juried.
- 2013 Artist of the Year: HENSE, Atlanta Magazine, Best of Atlanta, Visual Arts, December issue.
- 2013 Americans for the Arts Public Art Network Award, 2013 Year in Review Program, South Broad Murals, Atlanta, GA.
- 2011 ULI Atlanta, Development of Excellence Award, Public Art created for Shops Around Lenox, Atlanta, GA, Juried.
- 2011 Project Grant (Public Murals), Atlanta BeltLine Inc, Atlanta, GA, Juried.
- 2011 Project Grant (Public Murals), City of Atlanta Office of Cultural Affairs, Atlanta, GA, Juried.
- 2010 Project Grant (Public Murals), Atlanta BeltLine Inc, Atlanta, GA, Juried.
- 2009 Promax BDA Design Award, Art Direction and Design: Image Campaign, Cartoon Network On-Air, Atlanta, GA

== Reviews and publications ==
- 2015 Unexpected Art, edited by Jenny Moussa Spring, Pg 50-51, HENSE, Chronicle Books, San Francisco, CA.
- 2014 Wiregrass Museum of Art, HENSE: Interior/Exterior Exhibition catalog, Essay by Dana Marie Lemmer, published by the Wiregrass Museum of Art, Dothan, AL.
- 2014 Graffiti Art Magazine, HENSE, The Urban Contemporary Art Guide 2014, Paris, France.
- 2014 Detroit Business, Public Artist Livens Up Detroit’s Madison Building with Giant Mural, Daily News, September, 2014.
- 2014 Atlanta Homes and Lifestyles, Studio Visit, "HENSE," May 2014.
- 2014 Wall Street Journal Magazine, Men's Style March 2014, "Detroit Art City," p. 41.
- 2014 Experimental Graphics Magazine, "HENSE the Name," Issue No. 8, 2014, p. 54-57.
- 2014 Spectrum: A Book Full of Color, Barcelona, Spain, Published by Sylvie Estrada
- 2013 Feifei Sun, “Artist of the Year: HENSE,” Atlanta Magazine, Best of Atlanta, Visual Arts.
- 2013 Graffiti Art Magazine, HENSE, The Urban Contemporary Art Guide 2013, Paris, France.
- 2013 Best Artist With A Big International Presence: HENSE, Creative Loafing Best of Atlanta 2013, Staff Pick
- 2013 Felicia Feaster, “Alex Brewer, from city streets to gallery walls,” The Atlanta Journal-Constitution, Go Guide, The Arts, D4.
- 2013 Sierra Nicole Rhoden, “A Visit with HENSE,” The Seen, Chicago’s International Art & Design Blog, Expo Chicago.
- 2013 “Monumental Abstraction,” Graffiti Art Magazine, Urban Contemporary Art, Paris, France, Issue 18, pg 8,9,38.
- 2013 “In Living Color,” The Portfolio, Block Magazine Toronto, Summer 2013, Issue 1, pg 32-37.
- 2013 Howard Pousner, “High Museum exhibit showcases local artists,” Atlanta Journal-Constitution, Visual Arts, E1 &E11
- 2013 Priscilla Frank, “Artist Hense Gives Place Of Worship A Wildly Colorful Makeover,“Huffington Post, Arts & Culture.
- 2012 Dustin Chambers, “Elevating Atlanta on South Broad Street,” Creative Loafing, Public Art.
- 2012 Debbie Michaud, “Stop Making HENSE,” Creative Loafing, Visual Arts, p. 14-16
- 2012 Ted Elmore, “Meet me at the murals: HENSE Hangs Loose in Richmond”, RVA News.
- 2011 Debbie Michaud, “Murals, murals everywhere,” Creative Loafing, Art News, p. 28.
- 2011 Johnny Carroll, Hense: With Paint On His Hands, Process, Purge Atl.
- 2011 Amy Wenk, “BeltLine Mural Brightens Park Bridge,” Arts, Midtown Patch.
- 2011 Catherine Fox, “All about mark making,” Atlanta Journal-Constitution, Go Guide, D6
- 2011 Felicia Feaster, “Street Art Goes Mainstream,” Atlanta Magazine, Arts and Entertainment, p. 42.
- 2011 Felicia Feaster, “Color Scheming in Mark Making in Black and White,” Creative Loafing, Visual Arts.
- 2011 Anastasia Simon, ” Mark Making In Black And White,” Haute Living Magazine.
- 2011 Wyatt Williams, “A Few Questions With Hense,” Creative Loafing, Culture Surfing.
- 2011 Thomas Wheatley, “Drawing the Lines between Vandalism and Art.” Creative Loafing, p. 28-33.
- 2010 Atlanta Homes & Lifestyles Magazine, November 2010, p. 49.
- 2010 Christina Steiner, “Local Arts”, Decatur Living Magazine, Fall 2010, p. 18.
- 2010 Creative Loafing, “Best of Atlanta 2010,” Artists, Poets and Madmen.
- 2010 Teresa Annas, The Virginian-Pilot, “From Clam Plant To Show Place,” Pulse Section, p. 10.
- 2010 Linda Cicoira, Eastern Shore Post, “New Pearls of Color in Oyster,” p. 5.
- 2010 Frank 151 Magazine, “The Seventh Letter Issue Profile: HENSE,” p. 122-125.
- 2010 Catherine Fox, “Project All About Community,” Atlanta Journal-Constitution, Arts Section D5.
- 2009 Felicia Feaster, “The Write Stuff,” The Atlantan Magazine, p. 40-42.
- 2008 Felicia Feaster, “Pretty Boys,” The Atlantan Magazine, p. 24.
- 2007 Juxtapoz Art & Culture Magazine, “Profile: HENSE,” p. 26.
- 2007 Felicia Feaster, “Tis The Season,” Creative Loafing, p. 12.
- 2007 Felicia Feaster, “Culture Surfing,” Creative Loafing, p. 41.
- 2007 Jerry Cullum, “Beauty’s In Details,” Atlanta Journal-Constitution, Arts & Books Section, K6.
- 2006 Garage Magazine,“HENSE,” Issue 11, p. 16-23.
- 2006 Los Angeles Graffiti, Roger Gastman and Sonja Teri, “HENSE,” p. 55.
- 2006 Mass Appeal Magazine, “Off The Wall,” Issue 30, p. 106-107.
- 2004 Supreme Quality, Compiled by Roger Gastman, “AWR-MSK,” p. 85-89.
- 2003 Graphotism, Issue 29, “LA Takedown,” p. 56-58.
- 2001 Vice Magazine, Volume 8, Number 5, p. 95.
