= Hyuro =

Argentine street artist (1974–2020)

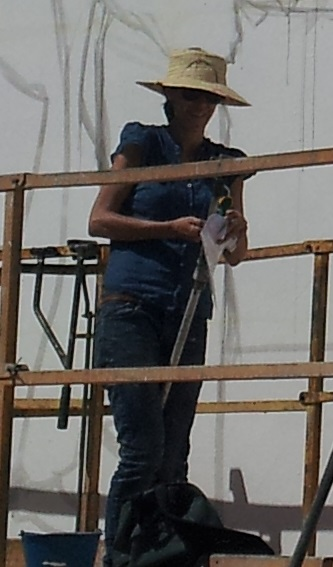
- working in 2015
- Born: Tamara Djurovic; 1974; Argentina
- Died: November 19, 2020; Valencia
- Education: Technical University of Valencia
- Occupation: street artist

Hyuro born Tamara Djurovic (1974 – November 19, 2020) was an Argentine-born Street artist who came to notice when based in Valencia in Spain. Her huge murals appear in many countries. They frequently feature faceless women and they highlight issues including gender based violence and deaths due to abortion.

== Life ==
She was born in 1974 in Argentina. She had learned to be an artist and paint but on canvas.

Her career came to notice when she came to Europe to take a master's degree at the Technical University of Valencia and she became involved in street art. She was introduced to the appeal of murals by Escif who is based in Valencia. He was born in 1997 and his art consists of simple images designed to make the viewer think. Hyuro's first mural on a wall was in 2010. Hyuro's images are also monochrome or with very muted colours. Initially her work was illegal but then she was asked to take part in festivals where the paintings were permitted by the organisers.

In 2014 a mural for the Living Walls project by Hyuro depicting a naked woman was vandalised in Atlanta. It was painted over after residents called the mural "pornographic."

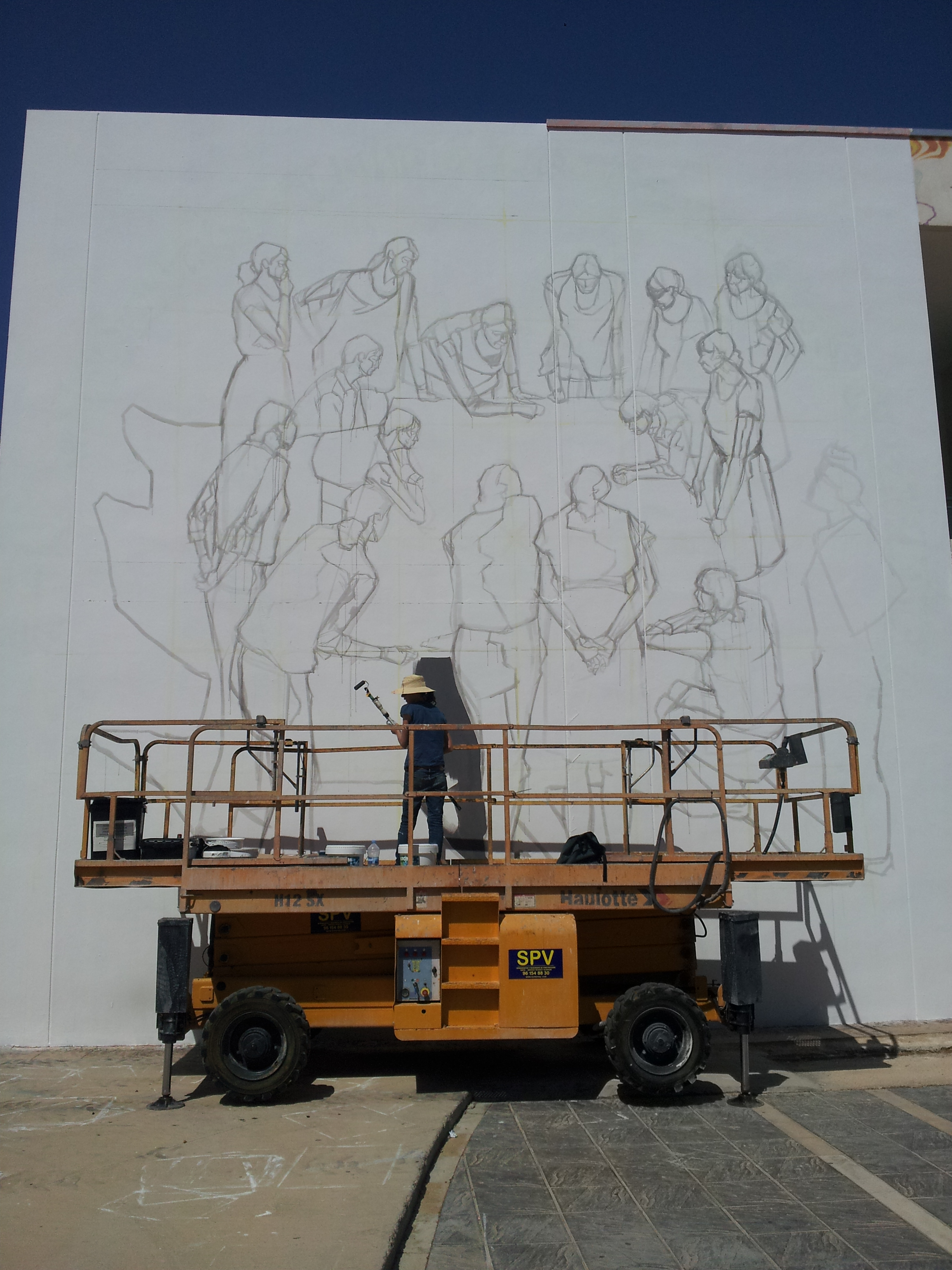
creation in 2015

In 2018 she created a mural in Aberdeen of two fighting nonidentical twins to highlight the political tensions between Scotland and England. The work was part of the Nuart Aberdeen Festival and as usual the faces of the combatants are not on display. Hyuro said that she tried to not show faces in her murals as this left the murals more open for interpretation by the viewer. To create the murals she does a lot of preparation. She frequently takes photographs of herself in the poses she requires and then gathers the studies into a larger group.

In 2019 she painted "Keep it Green" which shows a car hidden under a green sheet in Aalborg in Denmark.

== Death and legacy ==
She died in Valencia in November 2020 of leukaemia. She has left her work around Europe, particularly in Spain, but also in Argentina, Brazil, Mexico, the United States, Germany, Morocco and Tunisia.
