= Sarah Emerson =

American painter

Sarah Emerson is an artist based in Atlanta, Georgia who is best known for her landscape paintings of hyper-stylized versions of nature. Her work draws inspiration from "battlefields, war propaganda, literature, and idyllic gardens." Emerson is represented by Whitespace Gallery in Atlanta, Georgia.

Emerson attended the Atlanta College of Art and received a Master's Degree from Goldsmiths College in London, England. Her work has been exhibited throughout North America and Europe. In 2010 her work was featured in Manif d'art 5, the fifth edition of the Quebec City Biennial, Catastrophe? What Catastrophe!, curated by Sylvie Fortin and in Flux Projects Atlanta. Her work was also included in Noplaceness, published by Atlanta Art Now in 2011, and in 2012 she was featured in the 100th edition of New American Paintings. Her work has been in recent shows at the Atlanta Contemporary Art Center, the Dalton Gallery at Agnes Scott College, and Mason Muer Fine Art. Other recent projects include murals for the 2012 Living Walls Conference and the Elevate/Art Above Underground Atlanta public art project. Emerson is a faculty member of Agnes Scott College's Visual Arts Department and currently teaches drawing and painting.

== Images ==
- O’ Smithereens https://sarahemerson.com/osmithereens-2019
