= Theatre in the Square =

Coordinates: 33.95211°N 84.55053°W

Theatre in the Square is an American professional theatre in Cobb County, Georgia.

In July 2015, a new theater group billed as “Marietta’s New Theatre in the Square" rented the space formerly used by Theatre in the Square.
