= Graphotism =

- Cover of Graphotism No.38 featuring Seen
- Editor-In-Chief: Sarah Geoghegan; Frank Malt; Sami Montague
- Deputy editor: Ephraim Webber
- Categories: Art
- Frequency: Quarterly
- Publisher: Julio E. Abajo
- Founder: Julio E. Abajo; Frank Malt
- Founded: 1992
- First issue: 1992
- Final issue: September 2011
- Country: United Kingdom
- Based in: Wallington, Surrey
- Language: English
- ISSN: 1363-0075

Graphotism (subtitled The International Graffiti Writers Publication) was a magazine published in the United Kingdom and distributed internationally, which covered the subject of street art and graffiti. It is widely regarded as the most popular graffiti publication by graffiti writers, and was a quarterly definitive collection of street art all over the world.

Graphotism was published between 1992 and September 2011. The magazine was a popular item at Tower Records.

According to the deputy editor Ephraim Webber, "The writers [were] some of the most paranoid, un-media friendly people you could ever meet".
