= Georgia Ensemble Theatre and Conservatory =

Coordinates: 34.023545°N 84.357786°W

Georgia Ensemble Theatre and Conservatory (GET) is the resident professional theater at the Roswell Cultural Arts Center in Roswell, Georgia.

GET was founded in 1992 by Artistic Director, Robert J. Farley and Managing Director Anita Allen-Farley. It stages professional productions and conducts theater classes for youth and adults in all levels of theatre crafts.

GET hosted a world premiere of The Invisible Man by Larry Larson and Eddie Levi Lee, commissioned by GET.

== The Founder ==
Robert J. Farley was the co-founder and Artistic Director of the acclaimed Alaska Repertory Theatre in the 70's. He served as Artistic Director of the Alliance Theatre in Atlanta during the late 80's., where he directed the Atlanta premiere of Driving Miss Daisy in 1988.

== Past Productions ==
The GET productions include Buddy: The Buddy Holly Story, about the singer Buddy Holly. It was the most extravagant musical ever produced by GET. "Always... Patsy Cline", about the singer Patsy Cline, became the most popular production at GET.

1993-94 You Can't Take It With You, The White Rose, Diamond Studs

1994-95 The Fantasticks, The Illusion, Fools, Driving Miss Daisy

1995-96 The Servant of Two Masters, Dearly Departed, The Real Inspector Hound and the Fifteen-Minute Hamlet, Pump Boys and Dinettes

1996-97 The Invisible Man, Appalachian Christmas Homecoming, The Living, The Gin Game, The Foreigner

1997-98 And Then They Came For Me: Remembering the World of Anne Frank, Appalachian Christmas Homecoming, Lost in Yonkers, Travels With My Aunt, On Golden Pond, Forever Plaid, And Then They Came For Me (Tour)

1998-99 Having Our Say, The Delaney Sisters, First 100 Years, Crimes of the Heart, Déjà Vu, King Mackerel and the Blues are Running, Resident Alien, And Then They Came for Me (Tour)

1999-00 The Lion in Winter, The Nerd, Scotland Road, Something's Afoot, All I Really Need to Know I Learned in Kindergarten, And Then They Came for Me (Tour)

2000-01 Side by Side by Sondheim, Uh-Oh, Here Comes Christmas, The Widow's Best Friend, The Fourposter, Always...Patsy Cline

And Then They Came for Me (Tour)

2001-02 The Taffetas, Appalachian Christmas Homecoming, Shirley Valentine, The Miracle Worker, Evelyn and the Polka King, And Then They Came for Me (Tour)

2002-03 10th Anniversary Season Dearly Departed, A Taffeta Christmas, I Hate Hamlet, To Kill a Mockingbird, A Grand Night for Singing, Treasure Island (Theatre for Youth) And Then They Came for Me (Tour)

2003-04 Will Rogers U.S.A., Perfect Wedding, A Taffeta Christmas, The Camellia Ball, Morning's at Seven Tintypes, Treasure Island (Theatre for Youth) Charlotte's Web (Theatre for Youth) And Then They Came for Me (Tour)

2004-05 Don't Dress for Dinner, Jacob Marley's Christmas Carol, Searching for Eden: the Diaries of Adam and Eve, Of Mice and Men, My Way, A Musical Tribute to Frank Sinatra, Charlotte's Web (Theatre for Youth) Thurgood Marshall's Coming! (Theatre for Youth) And Then They Came for Me (Tour)

2005-06 Twentieth Century, Always...Patsy Cline, Sleuth, Our Town, Sisters of Swing, the Story of the Andrews Sisters, The Emperor's New Clothes (Theatre for Youth) And Then They Came for Me (Tour)

2006-07 Steel Magnolias, Forever Plaid, The Odd Couple, The Last Night of Ballyhoo, Beyond the Rainbow, The Emperor's New Clothes (Theatre for Youth) And Then They Came for Me (Tour)

2007-08 God's Man in Texas, The Gospel of John (Special Presentation) Season's Greetings, Six Dance Lessons in Six Weeks, Great Expectations, Triple Espresso, Treasure Island (Theatre for Youth) And Then They Came for Me: Remembering the World of Anne Frank (Tour)

2008-09 Lying In State, I Do!, I Do!, Southern Comforts, The Lady With All The Answers (co-production with ART Station) Buddy: The Buddy Holly Story Stuart Little (Theatre for Youth) And Then They Came for Me (Tour)

2009-10 Cotton Patch Gospel (co-production with Theatrical Outfit) Arsenic and Old Lace, The Men of Mah Jongg, What I Did Last Summer, Always...Patsy Cline, River Rat and Cat (Theatre for Youth) And Then They Came for Me (Tour) Buddy: the Buddy Holly Story (14th Street Playhouse)

2010-11 The Boys Next Door, The 25th Annual Putnam County Spelling Bee, Tokens of Affection (World Premiere) Inherit the Wind, Forbidden Broadway Greatest Hits: Vol. 1
