= Krog Street Tunnel =

Pedestrian and vehicle tunnel in Atlanta, Georgia

Coordinates: 33.7528°N 84.3636°W

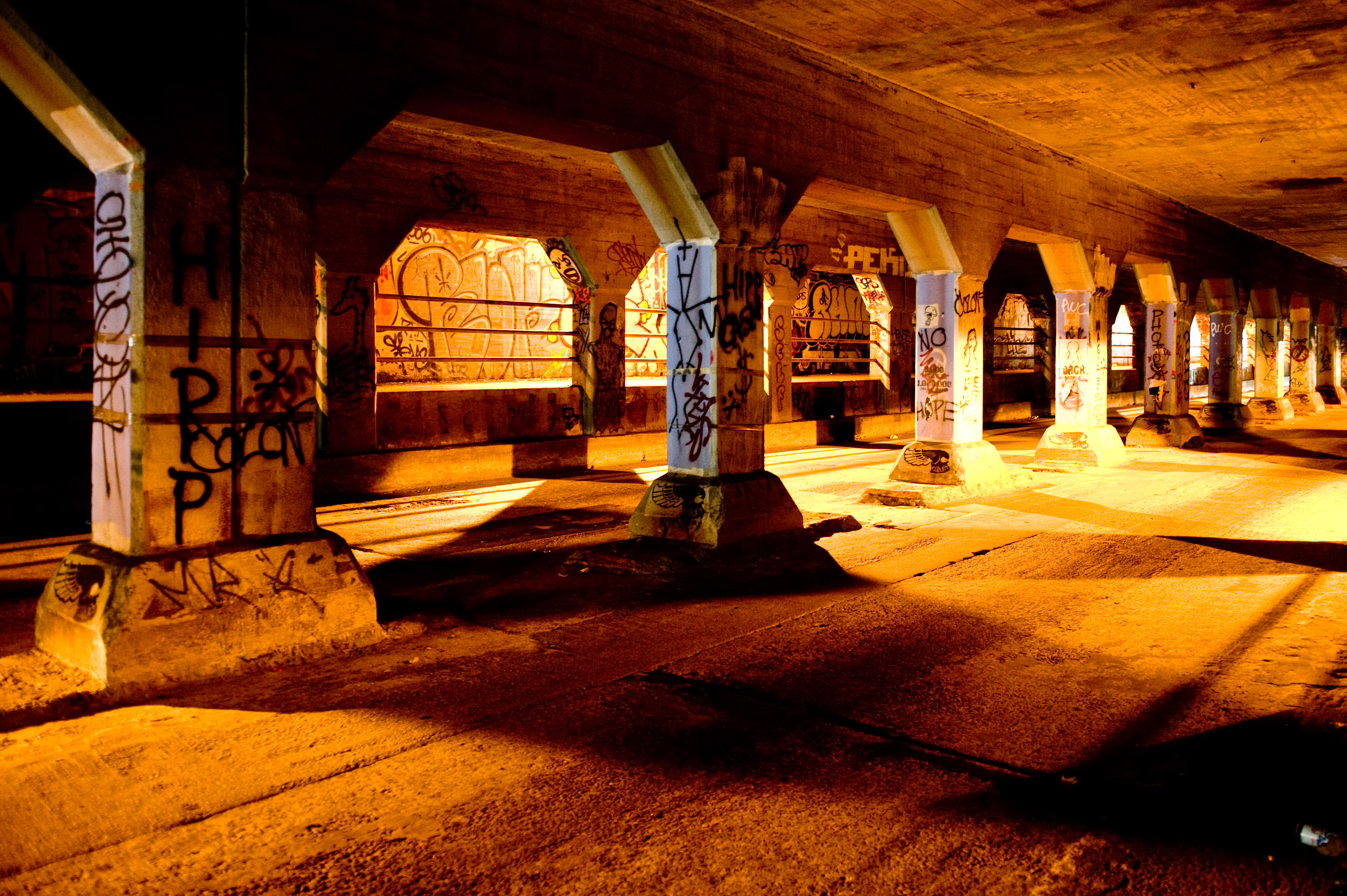
- Lateral view of the tunnel in 2008
- Interactive map of Krog Street Tunnel

Overview
- Location: Atlanta

Operation
- Opened: 1913

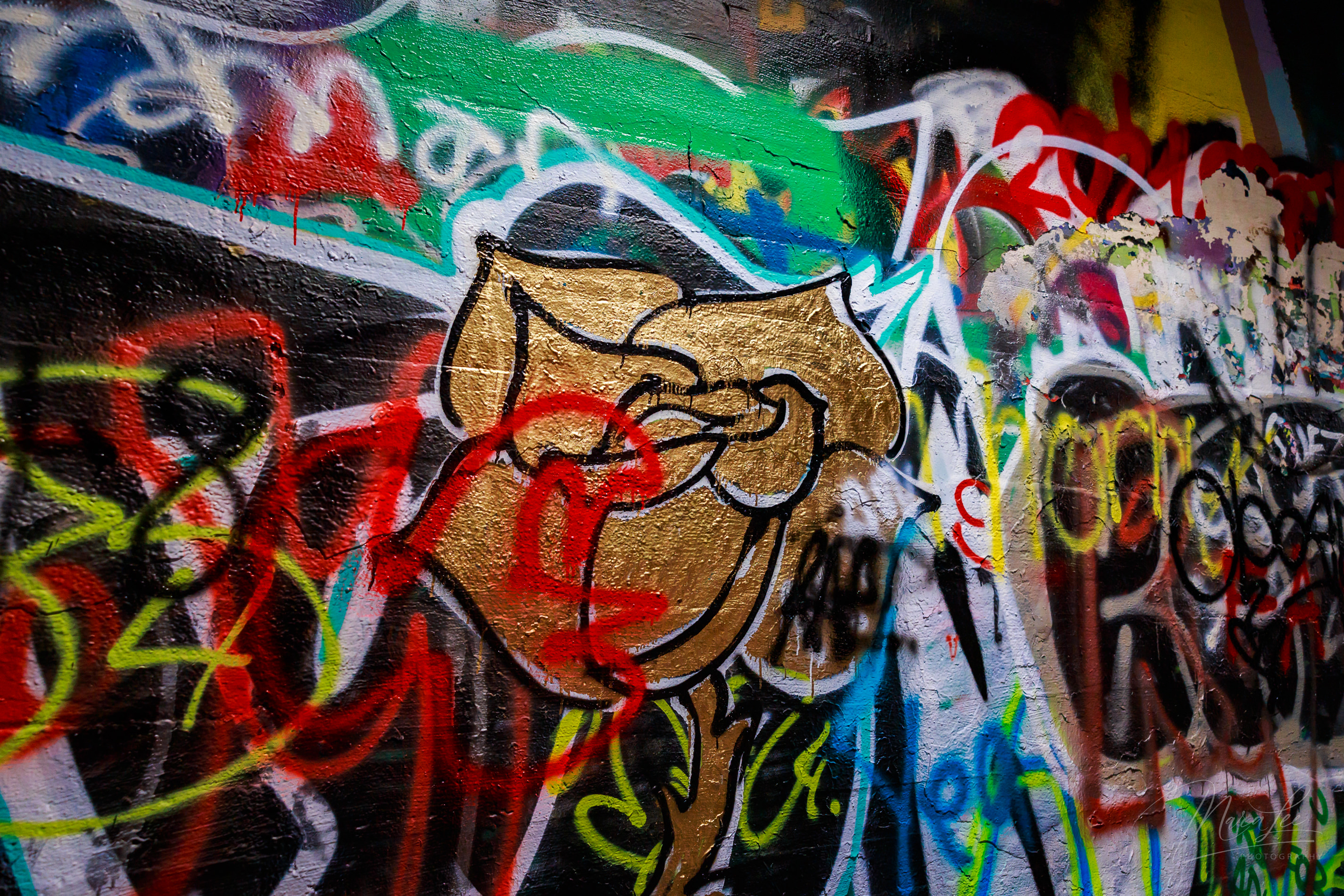
Colorful artwork inside the Krog Street Tunnel.

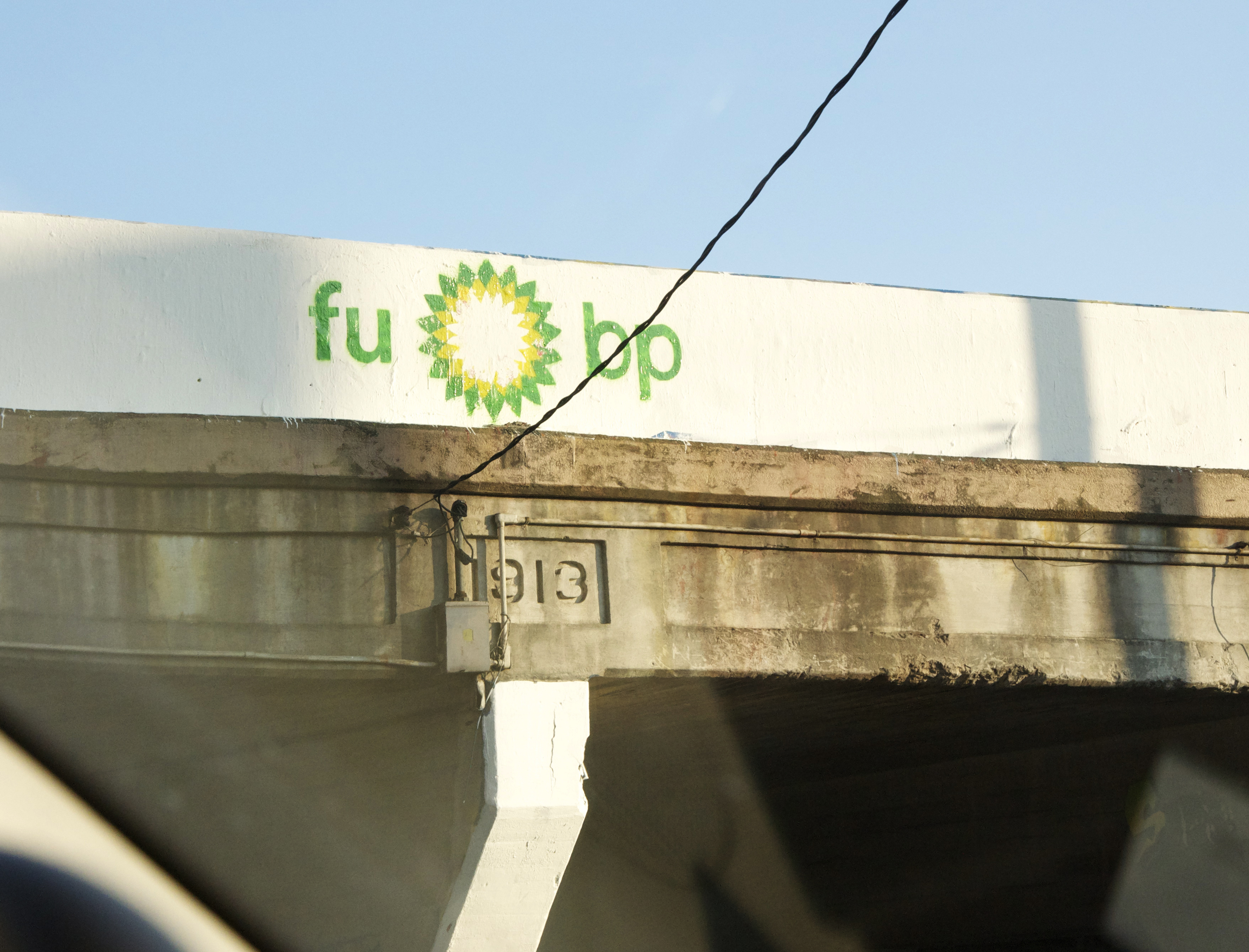
Entrance to the Krog Street Tunnel during the BP Oil Spill

The Krog Street Tunnel is a pedestrian and vehicle tunnel in Atlanta known for its street art. Built in 1913, the tunnel links the Cabbagetown, Reynoldstown, and Inman Park neighborhoods. It is part of the Eastside Trail of the Beltline for bicyclists and pedestrians to cross Hulsey Yard.

== 2014 protest ==
In October 2014, The Atlanta Foundation for Public Spaces planned a masquerade which was to be a private and ticket-only event. The event was voted down at the local Neighborhood Planning Unit, but a permit was approved by the city anyway. This move angered neighbors, who would not have access to the tunnel during the masquerade. Local artist Peter Ferarri stated, "I think artists were upset that their work was being used to promote and sell tickets to this party without any compensation to them."

At 10pm on October 22, 2014, a hundred protesters gathered to paint over all of the art with grey paint, rendering the tunnel art-less for the masquerade.

== See also ==
- Arts in Atlanta
