= Living Walls =

Annual Street Art Conference

Living Walls, The City Speaks is an annual street art conference co-founded in 2009 by Monica Campana & Blacki Migliozzi. The conference was first held in 2010. It was originally held in Atlanta, Georgia. In 2011, a sister event, called "Living Walls, Albany" was also held in Albany, New York.

== Events ==
During the events, local and invited artists create murals and other street art. Artists often paint directly on vacant buildings, though always after showing plans to and acquiring permission from building owners. According to the organizer of the Albany event, "The entire point of this project is revitalization". The Atlanta events also included lectures and a gallery show.

In 2012, only female artists were invited to participate.

== Controversy ==
In 2012, the third year of the conference, the event ran into trouble with the Georgia state Department of Transportation (DOT) due to miscommunication from the city. This resulted in the DOT lacquering the street art piece, "An Allegory," produced by an artist invited by Living Walls.

Another mural, created by an Argentine painter, Hyuro, depicted a nude woman, and was vandalized. It was removed after residents called the mural "pornographic."
