= Futura (graffiti artist) =

American contemporary artists and former graffiti artist

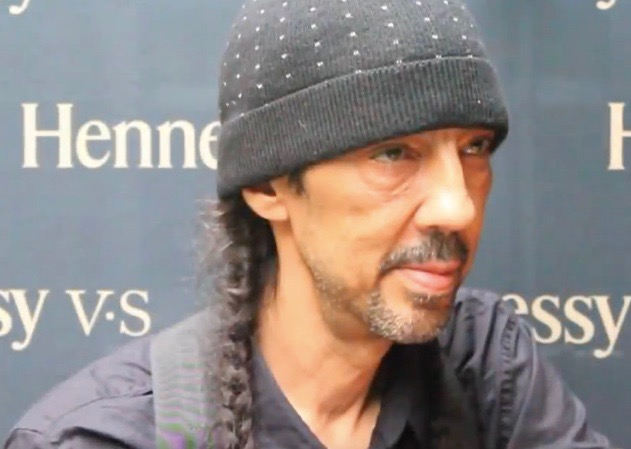
- Futura in 2012
- Born: Leonard Hilton McGurr; November 17, 1955 (age 70); New York City, U.S.
- Known for: Graffiti, spray paint art
- Movement: Street art, abstract art
- Website: futuralaboratories.com

Leonard Hilton McGurr (born November 17, 1955), known as Futura, and formerly known as Futura 2000, is an American artist.

Futura began painting graffiti as a teenager in the 1970s in New York and crossed over into the early 1980s art boom. Known for his distinctive style, a fusion of graffiti and abstract expressionism, Futura painted backdrops live on-stage for British punk rock band The Clash's Combat Rock tour. More recently, he is a successful graphic designer and gallery artist.

== Biography ==
Born and raised in Manhattan, Leonard Hilton McGurr started to paint illegally under the name Futura on New York City's subway in the early 1970s, working with other artists such as ALI.

From 1974 to 1978, he served in the U.S. Navy and traveled all over the world.

In the early 1980s he showed with Patti Astor at the Fun Gallery, along with Keith Haring, Jean-Michel Basquiat, Richard Hambleton and Kenny Scharf.

One of the most distinctive features of Futura's work is his abstract approach to graffiti. While the primary focus, during the 1980s, of the majority of graffiti artists was lettering, Futura pioneered abstract street art, which has since become more popular. Conversely, his aerosol strokes are regarded as different from those of his peers, as they are as thin as the fine lines usually associated with the use of an airbrush.

While he is primarily known as a graffiti artist, much of his work is as an illustrator and graphic designer of album covers, first becoming involved with the British punk rock band The Clash; producing a sleeve for their "This Is Radio Clash" 7" single and handwriting the sleeve notes and lyrics sheet for their album Combat Rock (1982). He also toured extensively with The Clash during the Combat Rock tour, "performing" with them on stage by spray painting backdrops while the band performed. His rap appeared on the Clash song "Overpowered by Funk. Futura also provided the cover photograph for Deftones' 2012 album Koi No Yokan.

In 1985, he took part in the first meeting of the graffiti and urban art movement in Bondy, France (organized by VLP (Vive la Peinture), along with Speedy Graphito, Miss Tic, SP 38, Epsylon Point, Blek le Rat, Jef Aérosol, Nuklé-Art, Kim Prisu, Banlieue-Banlieue.

In the mid-1980s, he began hustling as a bike messenger and worked at a Queens post office in order to support his son, as he found it difficult to maintain his job as a gallery artist.

Years later James Lavelle resurrected Futura's career by getting him, alongside Ben Drury, to produce the artwork for several releases on Mo' Wax records; this also led to Futura producing the imagery which has largely defined Lavelle's Unkle project.

During the 1990s he was involved with clothing companies such as GFS, Subware and Project Dragon. More recently much of Futura's artwork has evolved into the production of collectible toys, streetwear, sneakers; and a diverse range of creative media, working with Recon, Nike, Medicom Toy, Undercover, Supreme, Levi's and A Bathing Ape.

Futura also designs his own clothing under the label Futura Laboratories with a store located in Fukuoka, Japan.

Futura was interviewed and featured in the 2005 sneaker documentary Just For Kicks.

Futura appeared as himself in the 2006 action-adventure video game Marc Ecko's Getting Up: Contents Under Pressure alongside other notable graffiti artists.

His 2012 exhibition Future-Shock was curated by Nemo Librizzi and shown by Andy Valmorbida in New York City. Past galleries who have organized one man exhibitions include Fun Gallery, Tony Shafrazi Gallery, Philippe Briet Gallery, Galerie du Jour Agnès b., and Galerie Jérôme de Noirmont. Museum exhibitions include New York / New Wave at PS1 (1981), Coming from the Subway at Groninger Museum (1992), Beautiful Losers (2004) and Art in the Streets at Museum of Contemporary Art, Los Angeles (2011).

In 2012, Futura designed the special edition Hennessy V.S. bottle.

In 2017, Futura designed a collection of T-shirts with Uniqlo.

In 2019, Futura designed a pointman bobblehead, a baseball jersey, and a baseball cap with the New York Mets.

In late 2019, Futura collaborated with Funko to design decals for a Star Wars line sold exclusively at Target. Two designs were falsely claimed to be his but were in fact designed in-house by Funko [Red and Black Boba Fetts, both the 4 and 10 inch variants].

In 2020, Futura designed in collaboration with BMW a bespoke series of vehicles that were shown at Frieze LA 2020 in Los Angeles, US.

In September 2020 a pair of Nike sneakers that he designed, known as the "Leonard Hilton McGurr ‘Futura’ Nike Dunk High Pro SB ‘FLOM’" sold at auction for US$63,000.

== Publications ==
- 1981: Events, Artist invite Artists. New York, US: New Museum. Text by Betty Fox. The New Museum of Contemporary Art, New York
- 1983: New Art at the Tate Gallery. Text by Michael Compton. Tate Gallery, London
- 1987: Spraycan Art. Texts by Henry Chalfant, James Prigoff, Thames & Hudson
- 1987: New York Now. Texts by Carl Haenlein. Kestner-Gesellschaft, Hanovre, Germany
- 1988: Subway Art. Texts by Martha Cooper et Henry Chalfant. Holt Paperbacks
- 1989: Futura 2000: Œuvres récentes. Text by Elisabeth Hess, Musée de Vire, Vire, France
- 1992: Coming from the Subway – New York Graffiti Art. Froukje Hoekstra, Stefan Eins et alt. Karl Muller Verlag ISBN 978-9054770039
- 1997: New York Graffiti Art: Coming From The Subway: Histoire et Developpement d’un Mouvement Controverse. Farthest Star, VBI, 1992, VBI 1997
- 1998: Generations of youth: youth cultures and history in twentieth-century America. Texts by Joe Austin, Michael Willard, NYU Press
- 1999: Pittura Dura: Dal Graffitismo alla Street Art. Texts by Luca Massimo Barbero, Renato Barilli et alt. Electa, Milan, Italy
- 2000: Futura. Texts by Ben Drury, Liz Farrelly, Andrew Holmes. Booth-Clibborn. ISBN 978-1861541345.
- 2000: The new beats: culture, musique et attitudes du hip-hop. Texts by S. H. Fernando. Kargo
- 2001: The graffiti subculture: youth, masculinity, and identity in London and New York. Texts by Nancy Macdonald, Palgrave Macmillan
- 2002: Aerosol Kingdom – Subway Painters of New York City. Texts by Ivor L. Miller. University Press of Mississippi, Jackson, US
- 2004: Disruptive Pattern Material: An Encyclopedia of Camouflage. Texts by Hardy Blechman, Alex Newman. Firefly, US
- 2004: Experimental formats & packaging: creative solutions for inspiring graphic design. Texts by Roger Fawcett-Tang, Daniel Mason, Rotovision
- 2004: DPM – Disruptive Pattern Material. Texts by Hardy Blechman, Alex Newman. Frances Lincoln
- 2004: Beautiful Losers – Contemporary Art and Street Culture. Texts by Alex Baker, Thom Collins, Jeffrey Deitch et alt., Aaron Rose et Christian Strike, New York
- 2005: East Village US. texts by Dan Cameron, Liza Kirwin, Alan W. Moore, The New Museum of Contemporary Art, New York
- 2006: Can't stop won't stop: une histoire by la génération hip-hop. Texts by Jeff Chang. Allia
- 2006: Plastic culture: how Japanese toys conquered the world. Texts by Woodrow Phoenix, Kodansha International
- 2007: The Warhol economy: how fashion, art, and music drive New York City. Texts by Elizabeth Currid, Princeton University Press
- 2008: Street Art: The Graffiti Revolution. Texts by Cedar Lewisohn, Tate, London
- 2008: The Elms Lesters Book and Christmas Exhibition. Texts by Ben Jones, Paul Jones et alt. Elms Lesters Paintings Rooms, London
- 2009: Subway Art: 25th Anniversary Edition. Texts by Martha Cooper, Henry Chalfant, Chronicle Books
- 2009: American Graffiti. Margo Thompson. Parkstone
- 2009: Graffiti New York. Texts by Eric Felisbret, James Prigoff, Luke Felisbret, Abrams
- 2009: Natural Selection. Texts by Fiona McKinnon, Iain Cadby, Atkinson Gallery, Somerset, UK
- 2009: Blade – King of Kings. Henk Pijnenburg, Henk Pijnenburg
- 2009: Né dans la rue: Graffiti. Texts by Hervé Chandes, Fondation Cartier pour l'Art Contemporain, Paris
- 2009: From Style Writing to Art (A Street Art Anthology). Texts by Magda Danysz, Marie-Noëlle Dana, Galerie Magda Danysz, Paris, Drago, Italy
- 2010: Beyond the Street: The 100 Leading Figures in Urban Art. Texts by Patrick Nguyen, Stuart Mackenzie, Die Gestalten Verlag
- 2011: 100 artistes du Street Art. With direction by Paul Ardenne. Texts by Marie Maertens. Martinière, Paris
- 2012: Is The Art World Ready for Graffiti?. Steven Hager, Steven Hager at Smashwords, Los Gatos, US
- 2012: Graffiti, une histoire en images. Bernard Fontaine. Eyrolles, Paris
- 2012: Futura 2012 – Expansions. Text by Paul Ardenne, Galerie Jérôme by Noirmont, Paris

== Solo exhibitions ==
- 1982 Futura 2000, Fnac-Strasbourg, Strasbourg
- 1982 Futura 2000, Fun Gallery, New York
- 1983 Futura 2000, Yvon Lambert Gallery, Paris
- 1983 Futura 2000, Fun Gallery, New York
- 1983 Futura 2000, Yaki Korinblit Gallery, Amsterdam
- 1983 Futura 2000, 51X Gallery, New York
- 1983 Futura 2000, Baronian-Lambert, Gent
- 1983 Futura 2000, Four Blue Squares, San Francisco
- 1984 Futura 2000, Yaki Korinblit Gallery, Amsterdam
- 1984 Futura 2000, Fun Gallery, New York
- 1984 Homage to Picasso, Shafrazi Gallery, New York
- 1985 Futura 2000, Shafrazi Gallery, New York
- 1985 Futura 2000, Michael Kohn Gallery, Los Angeles
- 1986 Futura 2000, Semaphore Gallery, New York
- 1988 Futura 2000, Philippe Briet Gallery, New York
- 1989 Futura 2000, Galerie du Jour, Paris
- 1989 Futura 2000, Musée de Vire, Vire
- 1989 Futura 2000, Arcs & Cracs, Barcelona
- 1990 Futura 2000, Gallery B5, Monaco
- 1990 Futura 2000, Philippe Briet Gallery, New York
- 1990 Futura 2000, Martin Lawrence Gallery, New York
- 1991 Futura 2000, Galerie du Jour, Paris
- 1992 Futura 2000, Galerie du Jour, Paris
- 1993 Futura 2000, 01 Gallery, Los Angeles
- 1994 Untitled, Gallery Cotthem-Knokke, Barcelona
- 1994 Futura 2000, Time Space Light, New York
- 1996 Futura 2000, Solaria, Fukuoka
- 1996 Futura 2000, Livestock Gallery, New York
- 1996 Futura 2000, L'Aeronef, Lille
- 1999 Futura 2000, Variant, New York
- 2000 Futura 2000, Bob, New York
- 2001 Futura 2000 x UNKLE Colette, Paris
- 2002 Futura 2000 Place, Space 3, Sydney, Australia
- 2005 Futura 2000, Year in Pictures V1 Gallery, Copenhagen
- 2009 Futura 2000 – Collection Patrick Lerouge, Ecole Spéciale d’Architecture, Paris
- 2013 Futura 2000, Ica, London
- 2014 Introspective, Magda Danysz Gallery, Paris
- 2014 Timewarp, Schusev State Museum Of Architecture, Moscow
- 2014 Futura, Md Gallery, Shanghai
- 2015 The Bridges of Graffiti, Venice Biennale, Venice
- 2016 Futura: NEW HORIZONS, Library Street Collective, Detroit
- 2023 Futura2000: Breaking Out, UB Art Galleries, Buffalo

== Collections ==
Futura's work is held in the following permanent public collections:

- Collection de la Société Générale, New York
- Fonds Municipal d´Art Contemporain de la Ville de Paris, Paris
- Musée de Vire, Vire, France
- Museo d'Arte Moderna di Bologna, Bologna, Italy

== Appearances in other media ==
- On The Clash's Combat Rock, Futura delivers a spoken word part on the song "Overpowered by Funk". The Clash also appeared on his song "The Escapades of Futura."
- In Emile de Antonio's 1982 film In the King of Prussia Futura creates the film's opening title as a graffiti mural.
- On the album MiLight Futura's voice can be heard giving a shoutout to artist DJ Krush.
- In DJ Mehdi's 2002 music video "Breakaway", Futura covers an entire room with his signature tags in black marker and spray paint.
- In the 2005 film Just For Kicks, about sneaker culture in hip hop, as himself.
- John Mayer's 2006 music video "Waiting on the World to Change", alongside graffiti artists DAZE and the Tats Cru.
- The 2006 video game Marc Ecko's Getting Up: Contents Under Pressure as himself.
- In a Motorola advert as himself.
- In a MasterClass, teaching his method and style, as himself.
