= John Mitchell (artist) =

British abstract artist (1942–2014)

- Born: 1942; Walton-on-Thames, Surrey, England
- Died: 2014 (aged 71–72)
- Education: Kingston College of Art
- Known for: Painting, sculpture
- Movement: Geometric abstraction, systems art
- Spouse: Margaret Shott (m. 1965; died 2013)

John Mitchell (1942 – 2014) was a British painter and sculptor known for his abstract, geometric paintings. He worked serially, generating families of paintings, drawings and cast objects from proportional systems, most prominently the Fibonacci sequence.

He taught at Coventry College of Art from 1964 to 1971 alongside the founder members of Art & Language, and at Stourbridge College of Art from 1971 to 1978. After a first solo exhibition at the Camden Arts Centre in 1972 he showed six times at Gallery Swart in Amsterdam. He was Gregory Fellow in painting at the University of Leeds from 1978 to 1980, the last artist to hold the post, and in 1987 was given a survey exhibition at the Ikon Gallery, Birmingham. His work is held in the Arts Council Collection, the University of Leeds Art Collection, Leeds Art Gallery and the University of Dundee Fine Art Collections.

== Early life and education ==
Mitchell was born in 1942 and brought up in Walton-on-Thames, Surrey. His father, Raymond, was an artist and toy designer; his mother, Renee, worked for Helena Rubinstein. He attended Kingston College of Art from 1959 to 1964. The artist John Carter, a fellow student, singled out one still life of Mitchell's in which the cube of the table was emphasised and the objects on it generalised almost past recognition. It was there, Carter wrote, that Mitchell's lasting range of colour first appeared: turquoise blues, burnt siennas, indian reds, mustard yellows and a particular light green.

== Teaching ==
Mitchell taught at Coventry School of Art and Design from 1964 to 1971, where his colleagues included Terry Atkinson, David Bainbridge and Michael Baldwin, founder members of Art & Language. From 1971 to 1978 he was principal lecturer in painting at Stourbridge College of Art, working under Barrie Cook.

He was appointed Gregory Fellow in painting at the University of Leeds in 1978, under the professorship of T. J. Clark. He was its last holder; earlier recipients included Terry Frost, Alan Davie and Trevor Bell. He then re-established the MA in fine art at Birmingham Polytechnic, running it from 1980 to 1983, and was senior fellow in fine art at Cardiff College of Art from 1983 to 1986.

== Work ==
Mitchell's first solo exhibition, at the Camden Arts Centre in 1972, consisted of a dozen canvases nine feet nine inches square, predominantly blue-grey, carrying isolated brushmarks and screen-printed images including spacemen and truck wheels. Carel Blotkamp described monochrome fields across which image fragments were distributed without apparent compositional deliberation, the outcome of a programme governing both images and procedure. The large monochrome Skin paintings followed, then assembled configurations of canvases in the Lock, Straddle, Convoy and Pier series.

Mitchell set out the structure of each series in written notes. The Pier paintings comprised:

"Two discrete units of a 2-3 ratio, run parallel in opposite directions on a Fibonacci sequence to the second of the only two points where each affords the other a single negative of its own unit, thereby giving a structural and conceptual tolerance."

Around 1979 he came to regard his reductive programme as a constraint, made the Cone sculptures, and from 1984 projected the resulting solids isometrically back into painting as the Projected Piers. Mike Williams wrote that the isometric third dimension in these paintings is not illusionistic but "clings to the surface of the picture plane rather than penetrating it", remaining diagrammatic while suggesting recessive and projective space.

He listed his own procedures as tracing, transfer, rubbing, dusting, masking, measuring, squaring-up and ruling, with no freehand drawing. Williams thought colour the least programmatic element in the work as individual colours were mixed away from base hues, a red moving towards pink or a blue towards violet. Later work in dry pigment applied the same systems to paper, and a 2000 exhibition at Leeds brought together drawings and cast objects using the Fibonacci sequence.

Mitchell was better known in the Netherlands than in Britain. Blotkamp, who recommended him to the dealer Riekje Swart in 1972, wrote in 1986 that Mitchell had virtually stopped exhibiting since 1980, and described him as a painter whose work ran counter to the fashions of the day. His 1980 Serpentine exhibition, a first London showing since 1972, drew little critical response. The sculptor David Ross, who exhibited with him in 1994, wrote that the work existed "on the edge of language", and called it "Mondrian dancing with Giorgio Morandi".

== Exhibitions ==
=== Solo ===
- 1972 Camden Arts Centre, London
- 1973 Ikon Gallery, Birmingham
- 1974–80 Gallery Swart, Amsterdam (six exhibitions)
- 1980 Paintings, Complete with Missing Parts, University Gallery, University of Leeds
- 1980 Serpentine Gallery, London
- 1986 Extracts from the Log of a Sixties Space Cowboy, Viriamu Jones Gallery, Cardiff
- 1987 Cones, Pyramids, Piers & 'Projections': "Objects without Subjects", Ikon Gallery, Birmingham
- 2000 16 Gunmetal Frustums and Fillers: 4 Bronze Blocks with Conic Voids, University Gallery, University of Leeds
- 2011 Incised and Cut Tondos, Lemon Street Gallery, Truro

=== Group ===
- 1988–89 The Presence of Painting: Aspects of British Abstraction 1957–1988, South Bank Centre touring exhibition
- 1994 Bronze Works, Wimbledon School of Art, London

== Collections ==
- Arts Council Collection, London — Gate, 1976
- University of Leeds Art Collection — Extended Pier IX
- Leeds Art Gallery
- University of Dundee Fine Art Collections — Tan, 1975

== Later life and death ==
Mitchell married Margaret Shott in 1965. They lived in Leamington Spa from the mid-1960s, and he was still working from a studio there in 1987. The couple later moved to Cornwall, where he worked from a house overlooking Newlyn harbour. Margaret died in 2013; Mitchell died in 2014, aged 71, of pancreatic cancer, survived by their daughter, Alice.
