= Gallery Swart =

Dutch gallery

Galley Swart
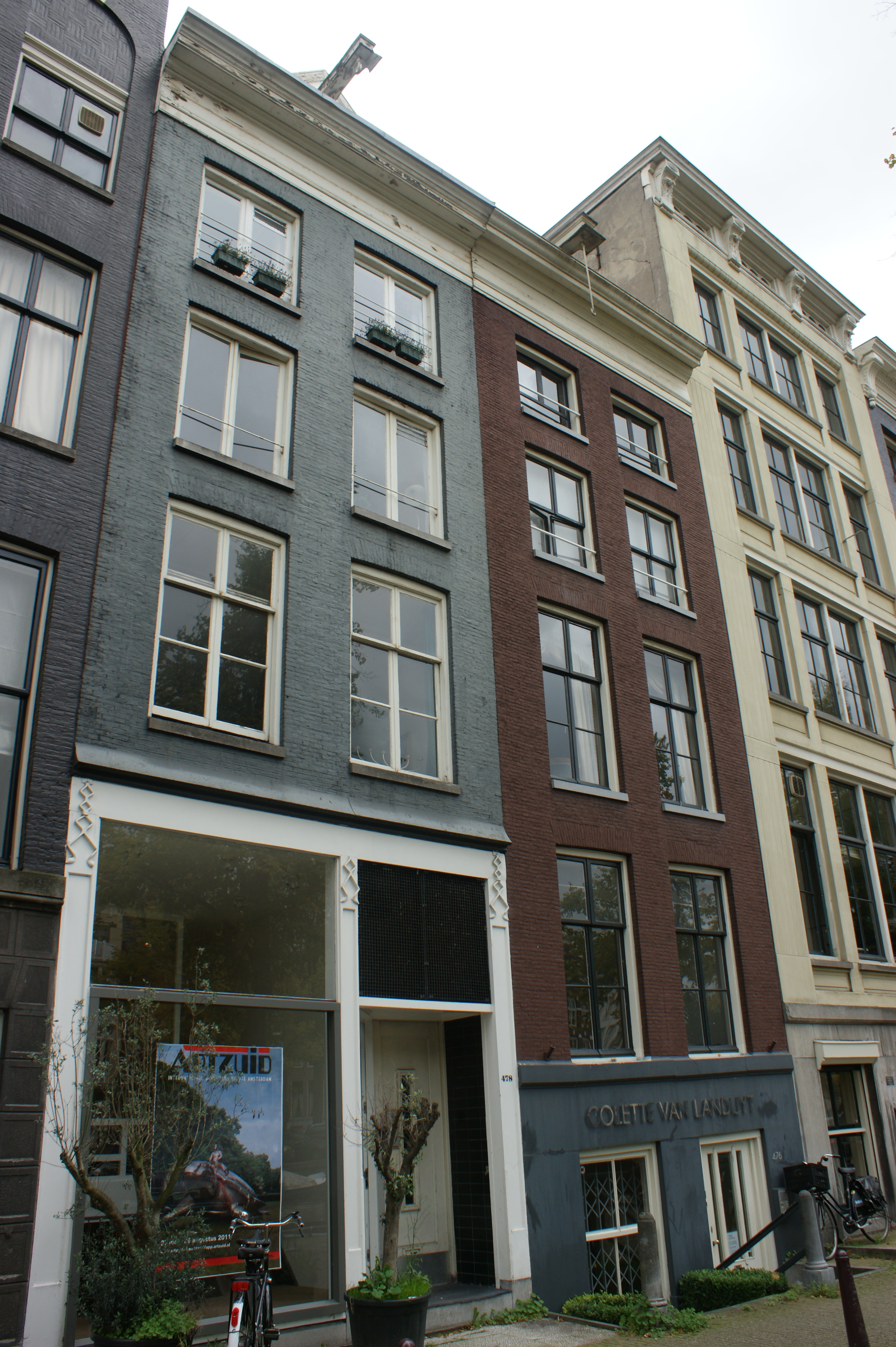
- Keizersgracht 478, Amsterdam, initial location of the gallery
- Location(s): Keizersgracht 478, Amsterdam Van Breestraat 23, Amsterdam
- Origins: Founded in 1964
- Key people: Riekje Swart
- Website: rkd.nl

Galley Swart is a former Dutch gallery of Riekje Swart in Amsterdam from 1964 to 2000. The gallery promoted contemporary art of varies young art movements, and primarily wanted to arise interest for modern art.

== History ==
=== Foundation and early years ===
The Galley Swart was founded by Riekje Swart and opened its door in 1964 at the Keizersgracht 478 in a time there were only four or five real galleries in Amsterdam.

The gallery came into prominence as promoter of a new group of young Dutch artists, which included Bob Bonies, Ad Dekkers and Peter Struycken and the German Ewerdt Hilgemann. This group opposed the dominant expressionism of the COBRA avant-garde movement, and worked towards a new type of abstract constructivism, named systemic constructivism and computer art.

In 1970 the gallery moved from the Keizersgracht to the Van Breestraat 23, close to the Stedelijk Museum. The facade was painted black and inside a shoebox 4 by 11 meters with white walls and fluorescent lighting. The next year, in 1971, the other contemporary art gallery in Amsterdam with an international outlook Art & Project moved to Van Breestraat 18 right opposite the gallery.

Beside the white reliefs and plastics she presented the pop art works of Ger van Elk, conceptual works of Jan Dibbets and contemporaries such as Donald Judd, Richard Paul Lohse, François Morellet, Robert Ryman en Richard Tuttle. There were new exhibitions every three weeks with unique artworks as well as multiples with prices starting at 40 Dutch guilders.

=== Turn to Figuration Libre in the late 1970s ===
In the late 1970s the gallery took a turn to the Figuration Libre art movement, presenting works of the France Robert Combas and Hervé di Rosa, Germans such as Walter Dahn, Jiri Dokoupil and Milan Kunc. Minimalistic art was traded in for raw works, comic like, full of sex and violence.

While Gallery Swart remained at its location, the Art & Project gallery in 1973 already moved on to the Willemsparkweg 36 in Amsterdam. With the twist in orientation of the Gallery Swart, some of its elder artists such as Ger van Elk and Jan Dibbets left and joined the Art & Project stable.

=== Last years ===
The artists of the Figuration Libre movement in the 1980s soon became to successful for the galleries audience. The gallery took another turn and focused on another generation of young artists such as Bert Boogaard, Mark Dagley, Cecile van der Heiden, Joost van der Toorn Wim Delvoye and André van de Wijdeven.

=== Photo Gallery ===
Some examples of the type of works of the artists presented at Gallery Swart in the Netherlands over the years.

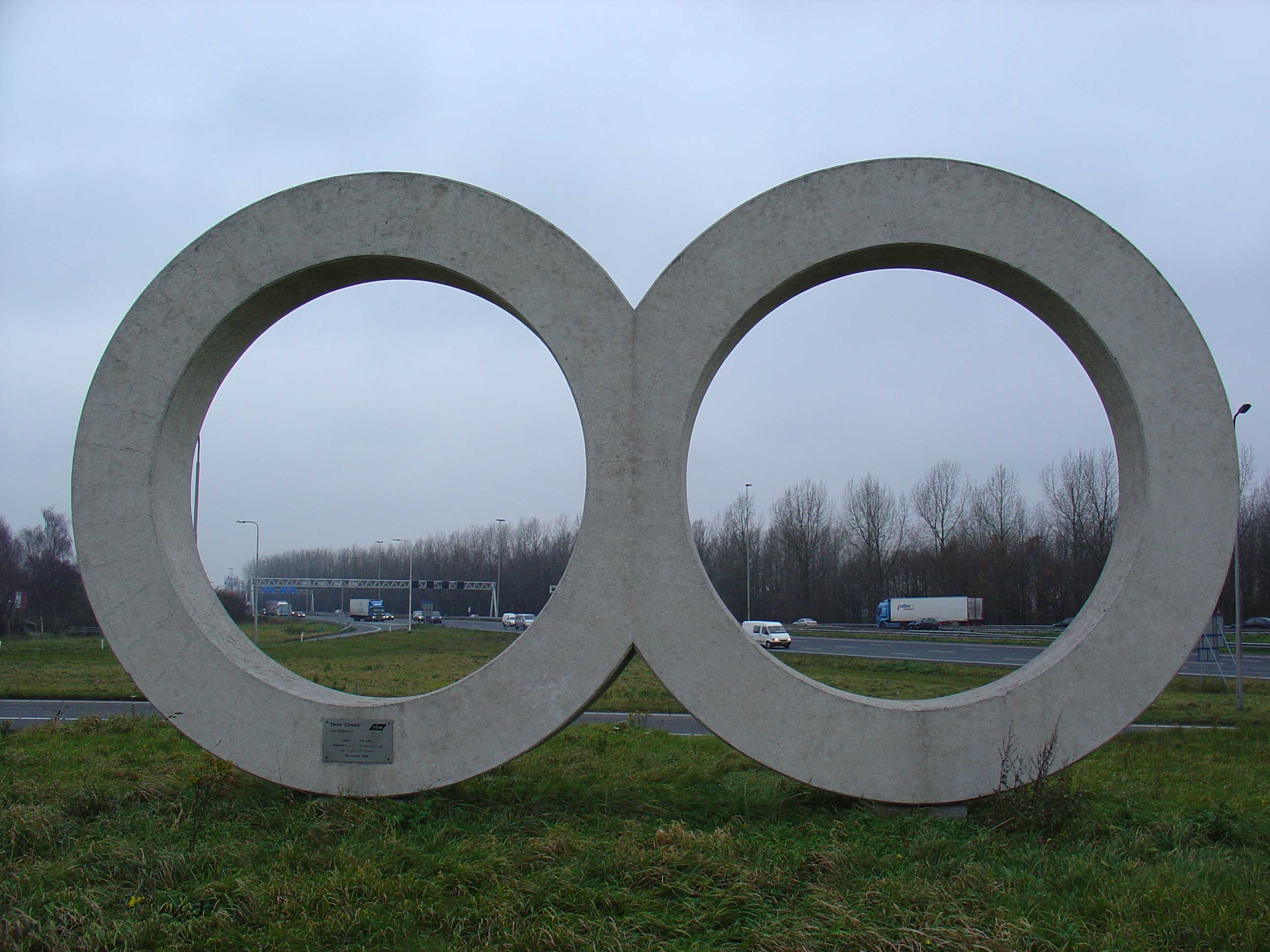
Two circles by Ad Dekkers in Gouda

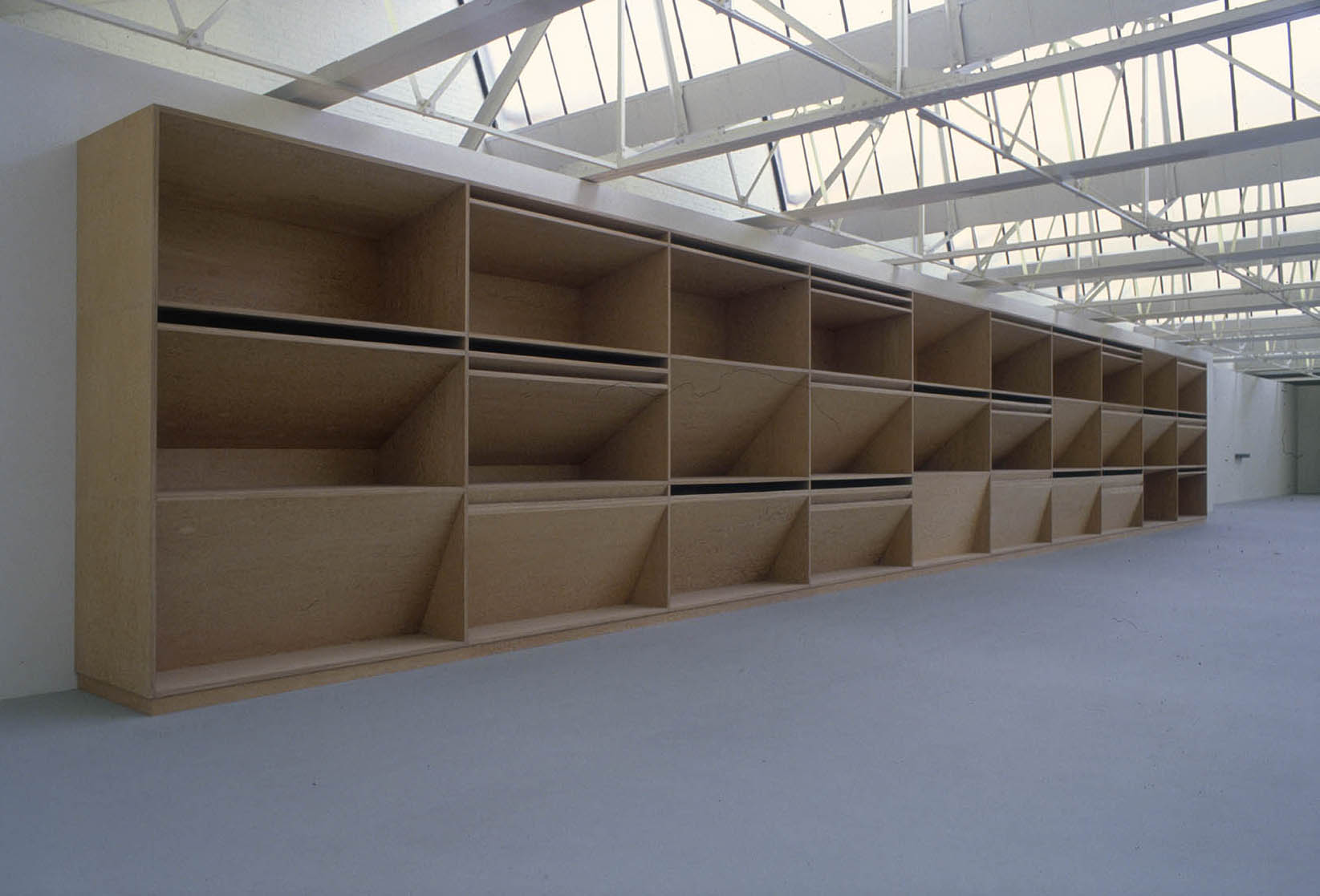
Donald Judd installation in Saatchi Gallery

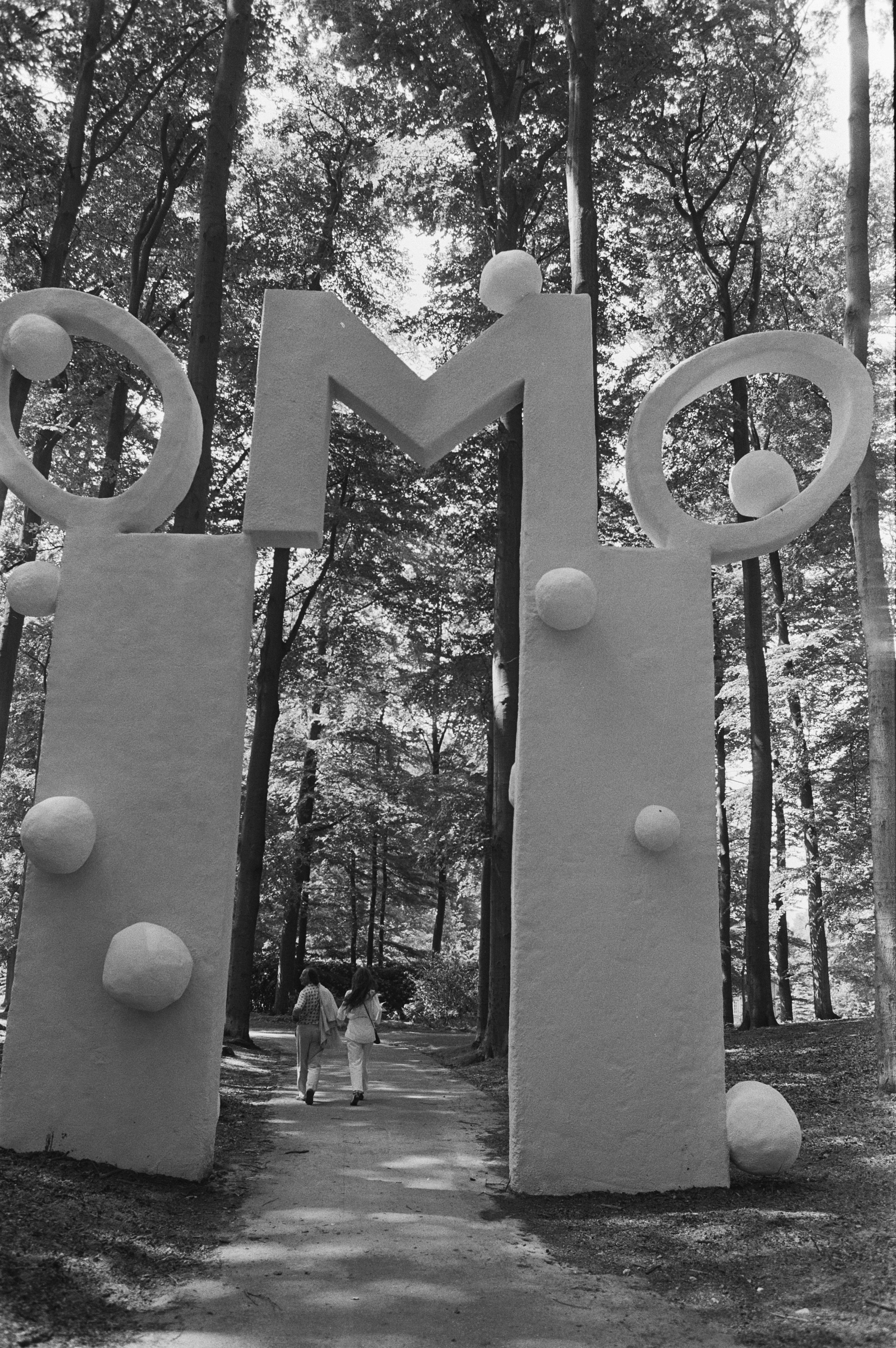
"Omo 86" of Georg Jiri Dokoupil at Sonsbeek 1986.

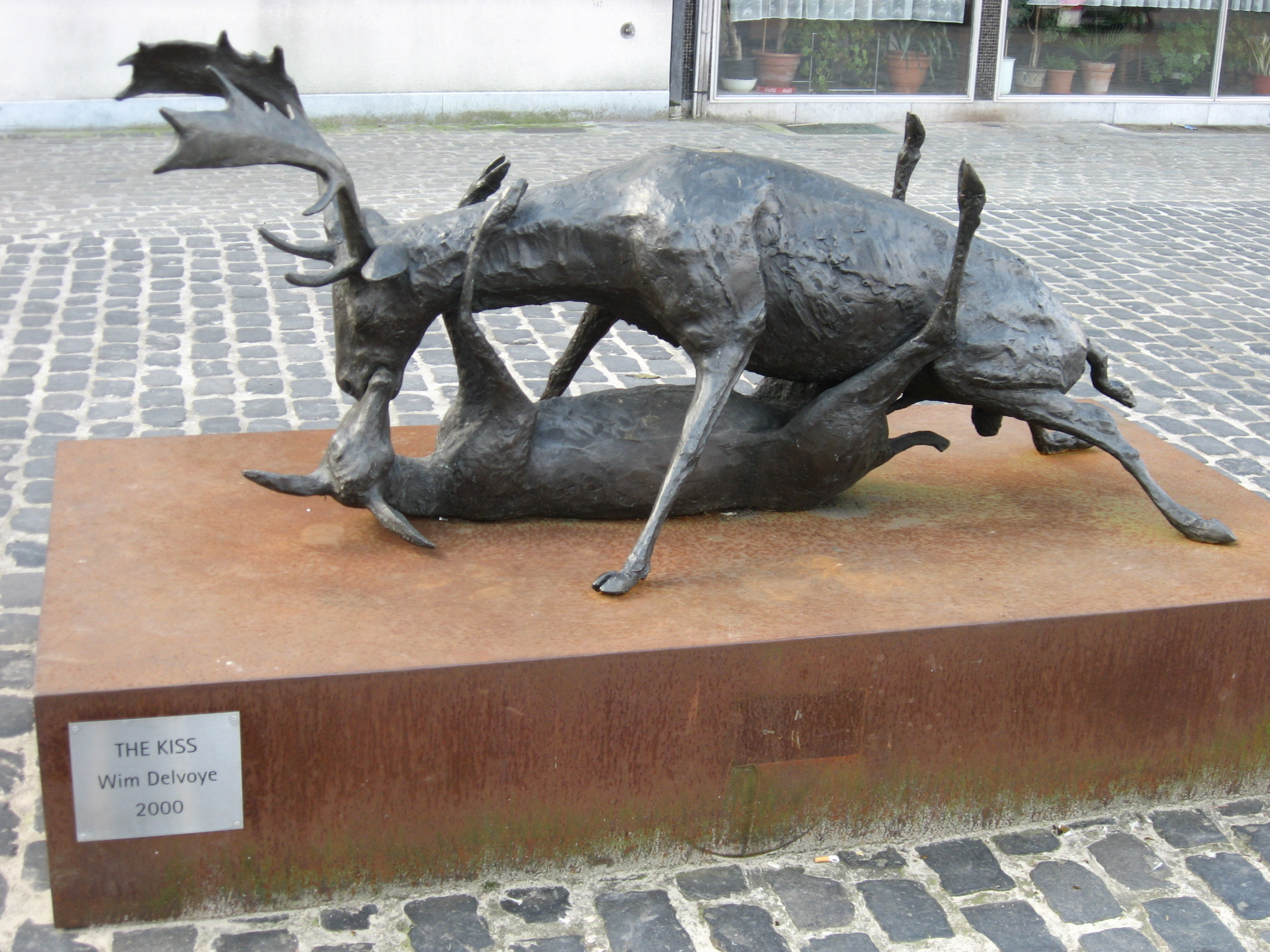
The Kiss by Wim Delvoye, 2000
