= Figuration Libre =

French art movement

Figuration Libre (French pronunciation: [fiɡyʁasjɔ̃ libʁ]; lit. 'Free Figuration') is a French art movement which began in the 1980s. It is the French equivalent of Bad Painting and Neo-expressionism in America and Europe, Junge Wilde in Germany and Transvanguardia in Italy. Artists in the movement typically incorporate elements of comic book art and graffiti into their work. They use bright colors and exaggerated, caricature-like figures.

The group was formed in 1981 by Robert Combas, Remi Blanchard, François Boisrond and Hervé Di Rosa. The term 'Figuration Libre' was coined by Fluxus artist Ben Vautier. Other figures include Richard Di Rosa and Louis Jammes. Between 1982 and 1985, these artists exhibited alongside their American counterparts Keith Haring, Jean-Michel Basquiat, and Kenny Scharf in New York City, London, Pittsburgh and Paris.

Figuration Libre (Free Figuration) can be translated as "Free Style".

== See also ==
Were sometimes associated with the term Free Figuration even though they were not present in historical exhibitions: The group Bazooka, The Brothers Ripoulin, Muslims smoking and Francky Boy Speedy Graphito, MIX-MIX (group), Rafael Gray, VLP (Vive La Peinture), group Nuklé-Art, Kriki, Kim Prisu, Etherno, Captain Cavern, Dix10 Group, established in 1982 (Roma Napoli and JJ Dow Jones), Didier Chamizo, Placid and Muzo, Juhel, Lhopital Sebastian (Sebastian said), Nina Childress, Frédéric Voisin, Paella Chimicos, Suburb Suburb, Daniel Baugeste, Jérome Mesnager, Blek le Rat, Zed Poinpoin, Mary Rouffet, Miss.Tic Gérard Zlotykamien and Frédéric Iriarte.
