= Valmorbida =

Valmorbida is a surname. Notable people with the surname include:

- Andy Valmorbida, Australian art dealer
- Elise Valmorbida, Australian writer
- Rafael Henzel Valmorbida, Brazilian radio broadcaster
