= Miss.Tic =

French artist (1956–2022)

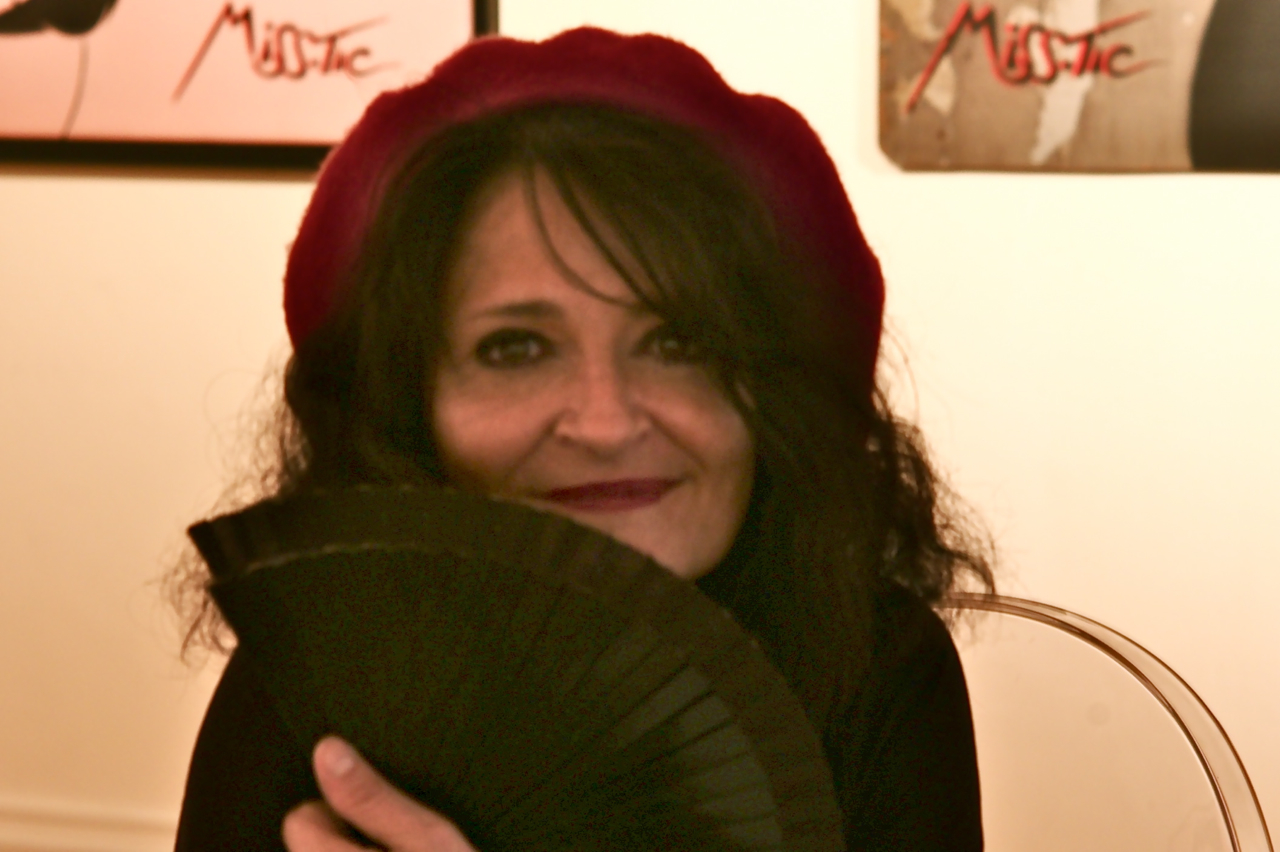
- Portrait of Miss.Tic, 2012
- Born: Radhia Novat; February 20, 1956; Montmartre, France
- Died: May 22, 2022 (aged 66); Paris
- Style: Stencil
- Movement: Street art
- Parents: Mohammed Aounallah (father); Ginette Baudin (mother)

Miss.Tic (born Radhia Novat; 20 February 1956 – 22 May 2022) was a French artist. She was known for her stencils of dark-haired women seen in the streets of Paris and associated with poetry. She was active as a street artist from 1985 onward.

== Biography ==
Miss.Tic was born in 1956 in Montmartre, France, to a Tunisian immigrant father and a French mother from Normandy. She spent her childhood there until 1964 when the family moved to Orly, in the southern suburbs of Paris. She lost her mother, her little brother, and her grandmother in a car accident at the age of ten; her father died six years later. She was then raised by her stepmother, a barmaid. She escaped from that world and quickly started to work on her stencils. In the early 1980s, she spent a few years in California, among punk milieus of San Francisco and Los Angeles.

She returned to Paris after the breakup of a relationship, and began her designs on the walls of parts of Ménilmontant, Montmartre, le Marais, Montorgueil, and la Butte-aux-Cailles. In 1985 she signed her first personal exhibition based on her art.

Thereafter she spread her ideas through poems and wordplay on walls and in books and exhibitions.

In 1985, she participated in the first meeting of the graffiti and urban art movement in Bondy, France, on the VLP's initiative, with Speedy Graphito, Kim Prisu, Jef Aérosol, SP 38, Epsylon Point, Blek le Rat, Futura 2000, Nuklé-Art, and Banlieue-Banlieue.

In March 2011, a series of stamps was issued for International Women's Day inspired by some of her stencils.

Miss.Tic died of cancer in Paris, France, on 22 May 2022, at the age of 66.

== Collections ==
- Fonds d’art contemporain - Paris Collections.
- Victoria and Albert Museum, London, England.
- Musée Ingres, Montauban.
- Mucem, Marseille.
