= Speedy Graphito =

French painter

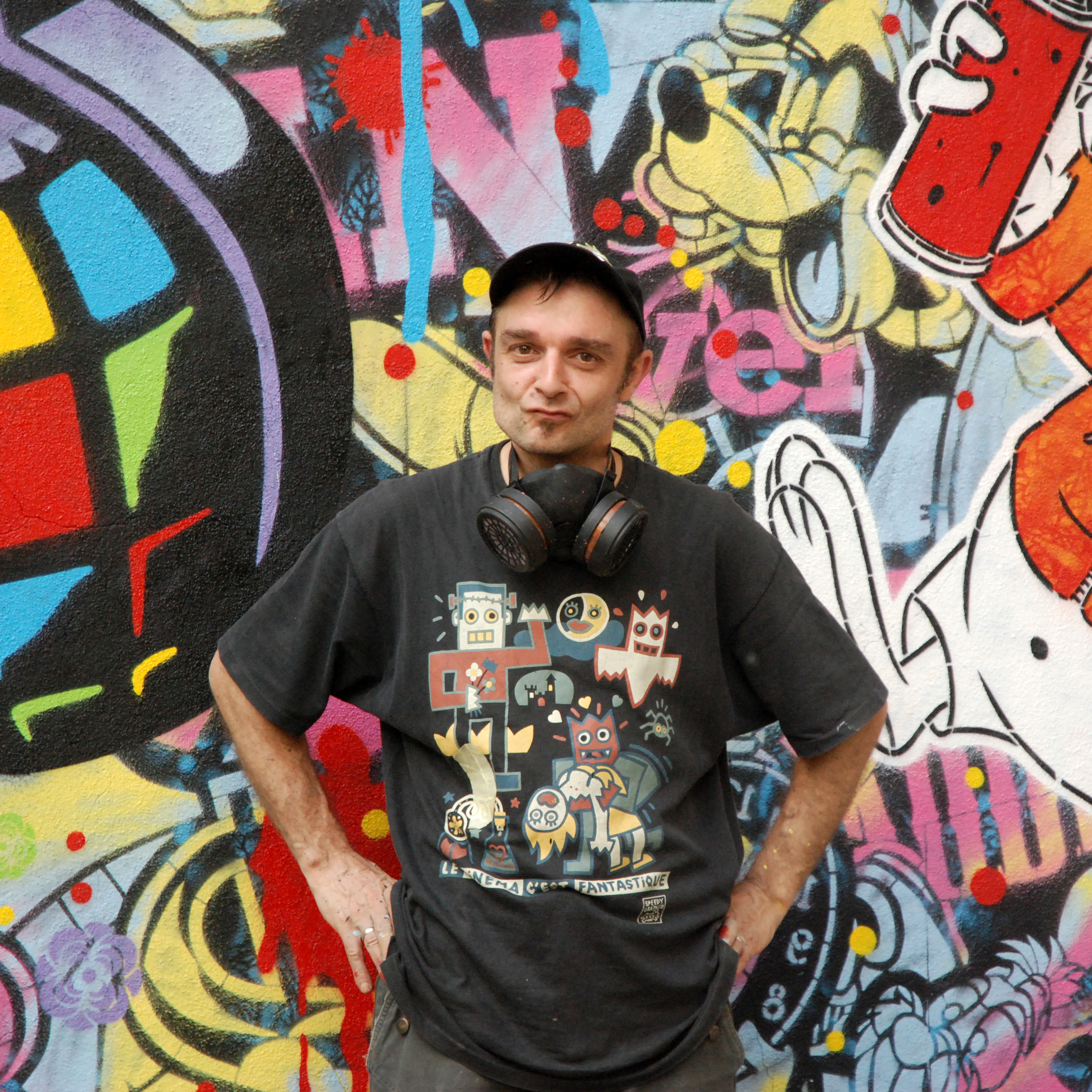
- Portrait of the artist, 2010
- Born: Olivier Rizzo; 1961 (age 64–65); Paris, French Fifth Republic
- Education: École Estienne
- Style: Street art
- Movement: Graffiti
- Website: speedygraphito.free.fr

Speedy Graphito (or Olivier Rizzo) is a French painter who is considered a pioneer of the French Street Art movement.

Speedy Graphito uses stencils and brush to create paintings, prints and street art murals. Since 1984, his work has appeared in numerous exhibitions worldwide and he has created many performance events.

== Background ==
Speedy Graphito was born in Paris in 1961. In 1983, after a brief career as a graphic designer and art director, he joined the collective X-Moulinex. He left X-Moulinex in 1984.

In 1985, Speedy Graphito attended the first meeting of the graffiti and urban art movement in Bondy, France. Other attendees included Jef Aerosol, Miss Tic, SP 38, Epsylon Point, Blek le Rat, Futura 2000, Nuklé-Art, Kim Prisu, and Banlieue-Banlieue

By 1989 Speedy Graphito had participated in several art exhibitions mainly in Paris. By the late 1990s his works were being exhibited in art galleries across Europe.

== Career ==
Speedy Graphito uses stencils or brushes to execute his graffiti. He incorporates schematic and dynamic characters approaching those of Javier Mariscal or Keith Haring. Speedy's other influences include 1950's United States, cartoons, Manga and images in Maya culture. He is also influenced by the iconography of Disney characters and video games,

One of Speedy Graphito works is “Temptation 2011” featuring Disney's Snow White enamored with the half-eaten logo of Apple Macintosh

Speedy Graphito lives and works in Paris.

== Exhibitions ==
2013

- Exhibition, Maison Triolet-Aragon, Moulin de Villeneuve, Saint Arnoult-en-Yvelines
- NewWorlds, Fabien Castanier Gallery, Los Angeles, CA, SOLO

2012

- French Invasion, Fabien Castanier Gallery, Los Angeles, CA

2011

- FreeWay, Fabien Castanier Gallery, Los Angeles, CA, SOLO
- Speedy Goes to Miami, Arts for a Better World Art Fair, Miami Art Basel Week, Miami, FL, SOLO
- Solo Show, Opera gallery, London, SOLO
- Graffcity, Opera Gallery, Paris
- Inaugural Exhibition, Fabien Castanier Gallery, Los Angeles, CA
- Urban Activity, Espace culturel Jean Cocteau, Les lilas
- Fondation Clément, Mix Art, La Martinique
- Atrium, Mix Art, La Martinique
- News works, Lille Art Fair (ArtUp), Galerie Brugier Rigail, Lille
- Back2Venus, New Square Gallery, Lille, SOLO
- News works, Artop, Lille, SOLO
- Exit, Galerie australe, La Réunion, SOLO

2010

- What did you expect?, Galerie Brugier Rigail, Paris, SOLO
- News works, Lille Art Fair, Galerie Brugier Rigail, Lille
- News works, St’art, Galerie Brugier Rigail, Strasbourg
- Mondovision, Artop, Lille, SOLO

2009

- Prime time, Art Partner Galerie, Brussels, SOLO
- News works, Lille Art Fair, Galerie Brugier Rigail, Lille
- Stepanska Street Art, Institut français de Prague
- No Man's Land, Ambassade de France au Japon, Tokyo
- News works, St’art, Galerie Brugier Rigail, Strasbourg

2008

- Sans issues, Art Partner Galerie, Paris, SOLO
- Voyage aux Pays des Merveilles, Centre Régional d'Art Contemporain de Fontenoy, SOLO
- Group show, Art Partner Galerie, Brussels
- Group show, Art Partner Galerie, Paris
- St'art, Art Partner Galerie, Strasbourg, SOLO

2007

- Connexions, Art Partner Galerie, Paris, SOLO
- Lille aux trésors, Artop, Lille, SOLO
- St'art, Art Partner Galerie, Strasbourg, SOLO
- Group show, Art Partner Galerie, Paris
- Group show, Art Partner Galerie, Paris
- Artenime, Art Partner Galerie, Nîmes, SOLO
- Urban pop, Ambrogi – Castanier Gallery, West Hollywood, CA, SOLO

2006

- Tatouages Urbains, Galerie Anne Vignial, Paris, Retro : Prospective, Galerie Suty, Coye la Forêt, SOLO
- St'art, Art Partner Galerie, Strasbourg, SOLO
- Sur les Murs, Centre Culturel Francais, Tlemcen (Algérie), Salon de la Lingerie, Porte de Versailles, Paris Aux arts citoyens, *Espace des Blancs Manteaux, Paris, Artistes Urbains, Galerie Anne Vignial, Paris
- Trendmarks, Galerie Suty, Coye la Forêt
- Avant travaux, Usines Mauchauffée, Troyes
- Artenime, Art Partner Galerie, Nîmes, SOLO

2005

- Parcours de la Bièvre, Lézart de la Bièvre, Paris, SOLO
- Deck’on, Exposition itinérante, Montpellier, Paris, Alpe d’huez, Bienne
- Salon de la Lingerie, Porte de Versailles, Paris
- Section Urbaine, Les Blancs Manteaux, Paris
- Rue des Artistes, Galerie Anne Vignial, Paris
- Dites 33, La Condition Publique, Roubaix

2004

- L’Aventure Intérieure, Espace Beaurepaire, Paris, SOLO
- Les Mutants, Péniche Antipode, La nuit blanche, Paris
- Les Muutants 2, Péniche Antipode, Paris
- Les Mots, Foire de Lille, Galerie Kahn
- Vœux d’artistes, Galerie Kahn, Espace Beaurepaire, Paris
- L’Humanité, Fête de l’huma, Galerie les singuliers, Paris
- Paf dans ton Pif, Hommage à Pif Gadget, Paris
- Art de Rue, (Mesnager, VLP, Graphito) Espace Tiffaine, Paris
- Série Murmures, Mémoires et Dessins Récents, Foire St Germain, Paris
- Stencil project, Arslonga, Paris
- Stencil project, Glazart, Paris
- Portraits incognitos, Galerie Sanguine, Paris
- Terminus, La Chapelle du Carmel, Chalon sur Saône, SOLO

2003

- Wake up, Galerie Polaris, Paris, SOLO
- Le Musée Idéal, Espace Beaurepaire, Paris
- FIAC, Galerie Polaris, Paris
- Ma Collection Préfère, Espace Beaurepaire, Paris
- Artistes, L’atelier d’artiste Chez Vous, Paris
- ART de Rue, Galerie Kahn, Strasbourg
- Epoque Epique, L’Atelier d’artiste Chez Vous, Paris, SOLO

2002

- Voyages en Terres Inconnues, L’Atelier d’Artiste Chez Vous, Paris

2001

- General motors, Fondation Colas, Paris

1999

- Artistes de la Galerie, Galerie Polaris, Paris

1998

- Welcome to Vénus, Galerie Polaris, Paris

1997

- Images Cathodiques, SAGA, Paris
- Artistes de la Galerie, Galerie Polaris, FIAC, Paris
- Exposition de Groupe, Galerie du chal, Saint Brieuc
- Lapintures, Galerie Hugues de Payns, Tours

1996

- L’être ou ne palette, Espace Saint Jacques, Saint Quentin, SOLO
- ARCO, Galerie Punto, Madrid, Spain

1995

- C’est moi qui Lapin, Sétois qui voit, Galerie Beau Lézard, Sète, SOLO
- The new pier show, Arco Galerie Punto, Madrid, Spain
- Artistes de la Galerie, Foire de Chicago, Galerie Punto, USA
- Les sirènes, Musée de Dieppe
- Artistes de la Galerie, FIAC, Galerie Punto, Paris
- Art de Groupe, Espace Cargo, Marseille
- Artistes de la Galerie, Art Koln, Galerie Punto, Germany
- La vie don't je suis le Héros, Galerie Polaris, Paris, SOLO

1994

- Que Passa, Galerie Punto, Valencia, Spain, SOLO
- Viva Lapinture, Galerie Italia, Alicante, Spain, SOLO
- Artistes de la Galerie, FIAC, Galerie Polaris, Paris
- Artistes de la Galerie, SAGA, Galerie Polaris, Paris
- Un artiste invite un artiste, Galerie Polaris, Paris
- Les déjeunées sur l’herbe, Galerie Beau Lézard –Sête, Paris/Seoul/ Tokyo

1993

- Le monde Alaloupe, Galerie Polaris, Paris, SOLO
- One man show, Galerie Polaris, FIAC, Paris, SOLO
- Artistes de la galerie, SAGA, Galerie Polaris, Paris
- Œuvres Monumentales, Galerie Polaris, Paris

1992

- One man show, Galerie Polaris, FIAC, Paris, SOLO
- Artistes de la Galerie, SAGA, Galerie Polaris, Paris
- Comme convenue lors de ..., Galerie Polaris, Paris
- Figurations, fin de millenaire, Exposition itinérante
- 5 Ans d’édition 1987–1992, Galerie Polaris, Paris

1991

- Paris, Tours, Rennes, Galerie Polaris, Galerie Michel Pommier, Galerie Collin, SOLO
- Artistes de la galerie, FIAC, Galerie Polaris, Paris
- Exposition de Groupe, Galerie Metropolis, Lyon
- Exposition de Groupe, Galerie Michel Pommier, Tours
- Pour Saluer le Destin, Musée d’Ingres, Montauban

1990

- Speedy Graphito, Produit de l’art, Espace Action, Paris, SOLO
- Retour d’Afrique, Galerie Michel Pommier, Tours, SOLO
- Speedy Graphito Peint l’Art moderne de 1990 à nos jours, Galerie Polaris, Paris, SOLO
- Artistes de la Galerie, SAGA, Galerie Polaris, Paris
- Artistes de la Galerie, FIAC, Galerie Polaris, Paris
- Exposition de Groupe, Galerie Patrick Riquelme, Vannes

1989

- King of the city, Galerie Polaris, Paris, SOLO
- Artistes de la Galerie, SAGA, Galerie Polaris, Paris
- Artistes de la Galerie, FIAC, Galerie Polaris, Paris
- Le Témoignage de la Peinture 1789–1989, Centre d’Art Contemporain, Avranches

1988

- Etude des Saints, Galerie Polaris, Paris, SOLO
- One man show, Galerie Polaris, FIAC, Paris, SOLO
- Artistes de la Galerie, Interarte, Galerie Polaris, Valencia, Spain
- Artistes de la Galerie, FIAC, Galerie Polaris, Paris

1987

- Le Radeau des médusés, Espace action, Paris, SOLO
- Lapinture au génie, Galerie Wanet, Charleroi, SOLO
- Les allumées de la télé, Grande Halle de la Vilette, Paris
- Exposition de Groupe, Art Jonction International, Nice
- Artistes de la Galerie, FIAC, Galerie Polaris, Paris

1986

- L’atelier de l’artiste, Galerie Polaris, Paris, SOLO
- Génie Artistique, Institut Français de Naples, Italie, SOLO
- Les Médias Peintres, Maison de la culture de Rennes
- Le Speedy Maton, Galerie d’Art contemporain de Nice
- Peintures Sauvages, Frasso Télésino, Italie
- Vers de Nouvelles z’Aventures, Centre Culturel, Évry, SOLO

1985

- A la recherche de Zarzan, Galerie Paradis, Paris, SOLO
- Meurtre dans un Château Anglais, Galerie Polaris, Paris, SOLO
- La boutique à Speedy, Galerie Polaris, Paris
- Emotions, Espace Saint Jacques, Saint Quentin
- Mouchoirs d’Artistes, Galerie Lara Vinci, Paris
- Détournement d’Affiches, Centre national des arts plastiques (CNAP), Paris

1984

- Et Dans Dix Ans, Espace Cardin, Paris

== Performances ==
2011

- Murs Peints, Rio-Brésil
- Performances, Mix Art Madinina, Martinique

2010

- Lézarts de la Bièvre, Paris
- Collage »Association le MUR– Paris

2009

- FIART, Performance pizza Beaubourg, Paris
- Réalisation d' un court métrage « Faites de beaux rêves »

2006

- Réalisation d' un court métrage pour « Faites de beaux rêves »
- Réalisation d’un film vidéo pour le DVD du groupe "Lukrate milk ".
- Performance pour le mondial de l'automobile.

2005

- Parcours de la Bièvre – Lézart de la Bièvre – Paris
- Festival international du graffiti Kosmopolite – Bagnolet
- Peinture de l’autobus du Batofar.

2004

- Stencil project » – Paris
- Réalisation du film "terminus "installation performance filmée.

2003

- Réalisation d' une série en images de synthèse " WELCOME TO VENUS " pour CANAL+.
- Création du groupe musical et vidéographique " French Legumes ".

2002

- Réalisation de vidéos pour "Le Festival du Chien à plumes ".

2001

- Réalisation de vidéos pour "Le Festival du Chien à plumes ".
- Réalisation de vidéos de scène pour le groupe musical " PLUTO ".

1993

- Création de l' identité visuelle de " La Halle Saint-Pierre ".
- Commande publique de la Direction des Affaires Culturelles de la ville de Paris.
- Création de l' emblème de la mission spaciale " ALTAîR " vol habité Franco-russe (C.N.E.S.).

1992

- Décoration de la péniche " EUROPE ODYSSEE " qui a rejoint Paris-Moscou par les canaux (FR3).

1991

- Décoration d' un hobbit-cat pour la traversée du Détroit de Formose par Olivier Chiabodo.
- Décoration de l' école polyvalente rue de la vilette (Paris) dans le cadre du 1%.
- Projections pour le concert de J.M. Jarre (La Défense - Paris).

1987

- Création de " SPEEDO " Le journal des fans de Speedy.
- Création d' une ligne de Tee-shirts " YOU ARE THE WORLD ".
- Décor de théatre pour " La nuit s' est habillée ce soir en scaramouche " de Saskia Cohen-Tanugi (Festival Molière de Montpellier)

1986

- Création de l' affiche " LA RUEE VERS L' ART " pour le Ministère de la culture.
