= Jef Aérosol =

French artist

Jef Aérosol is the pseudonym of Jean-François Perroy (born 1957), a French stencil graffiti artist. He has been an urban art proponent in France since 1982, and is a contemporary of Blek le Rat and Speedy Graphito.

== Biography ==
Aérosol was born in Nantes in 1957. He spray painted his first stencil in 1982, in Tours, and has been living in Lille since 1984. He has left his works on the walls of many cities. In 1985, he was on the first meeting of the graffiti and urban art movement in Bondy (France), on the VLP's initiative, with Speedy Graphito, Kim Prisu Miss Tic, SP 38, Epsylon Point, Blek le Rat, Futura 2000, Nuklé-Art, Banlieue-Banlieue...

Aérosol is represented by several galleries in France and abroad. He made the cover and gave its name to a book about street stencil art, Vite Fait, Bien Fait (éditions Alternatives/Agnès B, Paris, 1986). He has released several books: VIP Very Important Pochoirs (éditions Alternatives, Paris 2007), Risques de Rêves (éditions Critères 2011 + re-release in 2012), Parcours Fléché (éditions Gallimard / Alternatives, Paris 2013) and several exhibition catalogues.

== Gallery ==
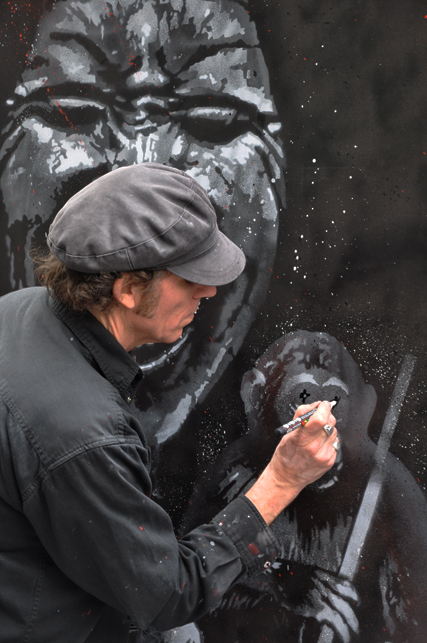
Jef Aérosol in Paris, 2010
