= Riekje Swart =

Dutch art gallery owner (1923–2008)

- Born: Hendrika Swart; 1 August 1923; George Town, Penang
- Died: 27 September 2008 (aged 85); Amsterdam
- Occupations: Art dealer; art collector
- Known for: Gallery Swart
- Awards: Benno Premsela Prize, 2002
- Website: rkd.nl

Hendrika (Riekje) Swart (1 August 1923 in George Town, Penang, Malaysia – 27 September 2008 in Amsterdam) was a Dutch gallery owner of Gallery Swart in Amsterdam from 1964 until 2000. She was awarded the Benno Premsela Prize in 2002 for her contribution to the development of visual arts in the Netherlands.

== Biography ==
=== Youth, education and early career ===
Riekje Swart was born in George Town, Penang, in Malaysia, as the daughter of Karel Swart (1891–1965), sea captain at the Koninklijke Paketvaart-Maatschappij and Anna Barbara Drabbe (1891–1986), a nurse in those days. After moving around with her family they settled in 1934, where she attended the gymnasium.

After the German bombing of Rotterdam the family moved to Laren, North Holland, where she finished high school. After the war she studied law at the University of Amsterdam, receiving her bachelor's degree but failing for her master's degree.

In the 1950s Swart was head of staff at a bank for years. During her studies she had read literature a lot and had visited theater. The 1949 COBRA exhibition triggered her interest in contemporary art and the protest movement of the artists, and by the end of the 1950s she turned her career around.

=== Gallery Swart ===
Early 1960s Swart started as assistant in one of the few galleries in Amsterdam. From her savings in 1964 she started her own gallery. Inspired by Willem Sandberg she wanted art and artists to be contemporary and groundbreaking.

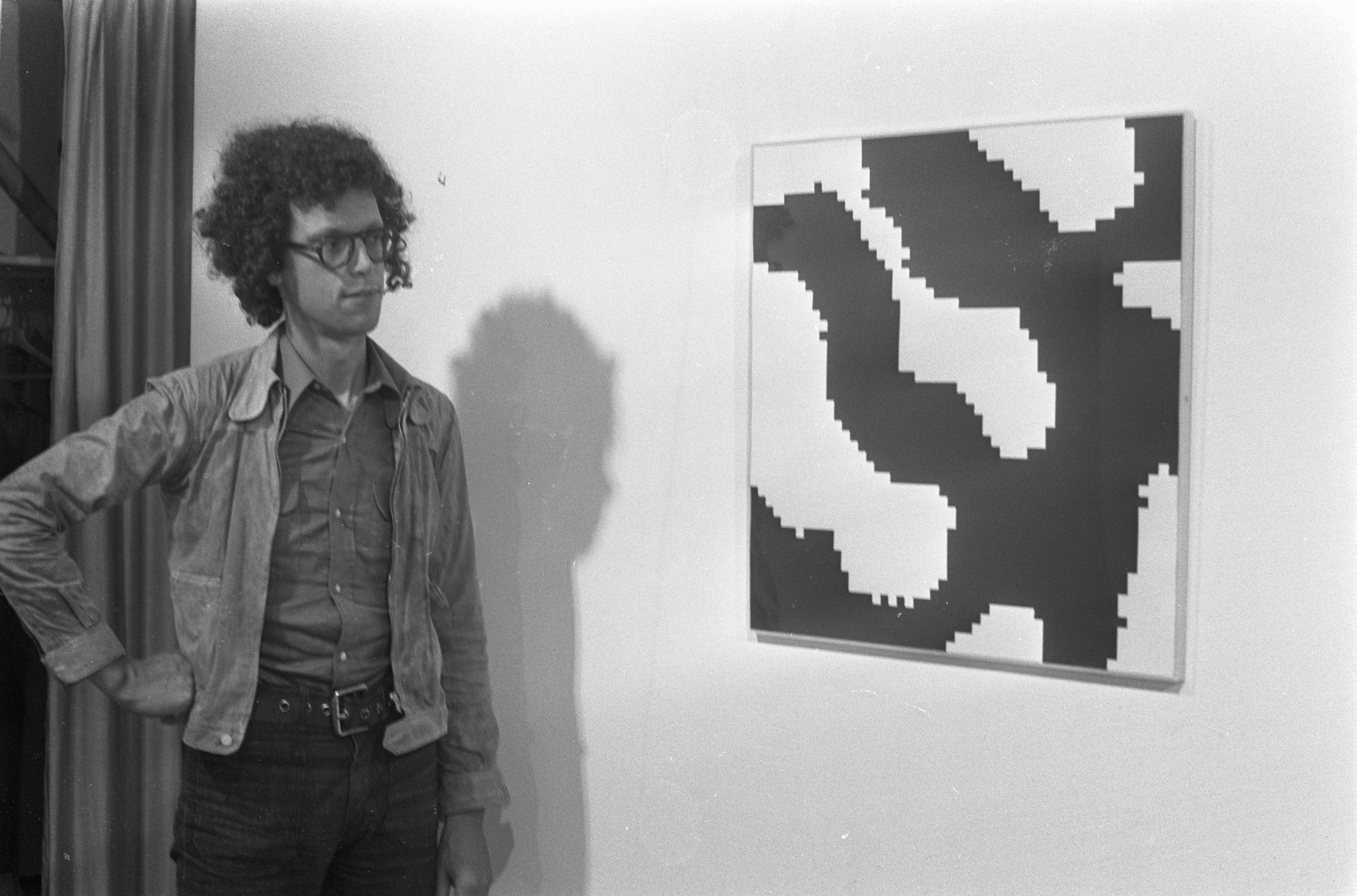
Presentation of abstract-geometrical art at the gallery in 1972.

Over the years Swart promoted multiple new art movements. She started in the late 1960s with the work of abstract-geometrical Dutch artists, such as Ad Dekkers and Peter Struycken, supplemented with conceptual artists such as Ger van Elk en Jan Dibbets and foreign colleagues. In 1970 she promoted this type of art as systemic constructivism and computer art.

In the 1970s she promoted the young Figuration Libre artists, which, however, due to their big success, became too commercial for her soon after. In the 1980s and 1990s again she adopted new groups of artists, and promoted their work for some time. Suffering from bad health, she closed the gallery in the 2000. For her lasting contribution to the visual arts she was awarded the Benno Premsela Prize in 2002.

== Reception ==
In an obituary in the de Volkskrant three days after her death in 2008, Riekje Swart was remembered as "the queen mother of the Dutch gallery world, the mentor of collectors, the tireless fan of art that leads the way."
