= Geography of Paris =

Coordinates: 48°51′N 2°21′E

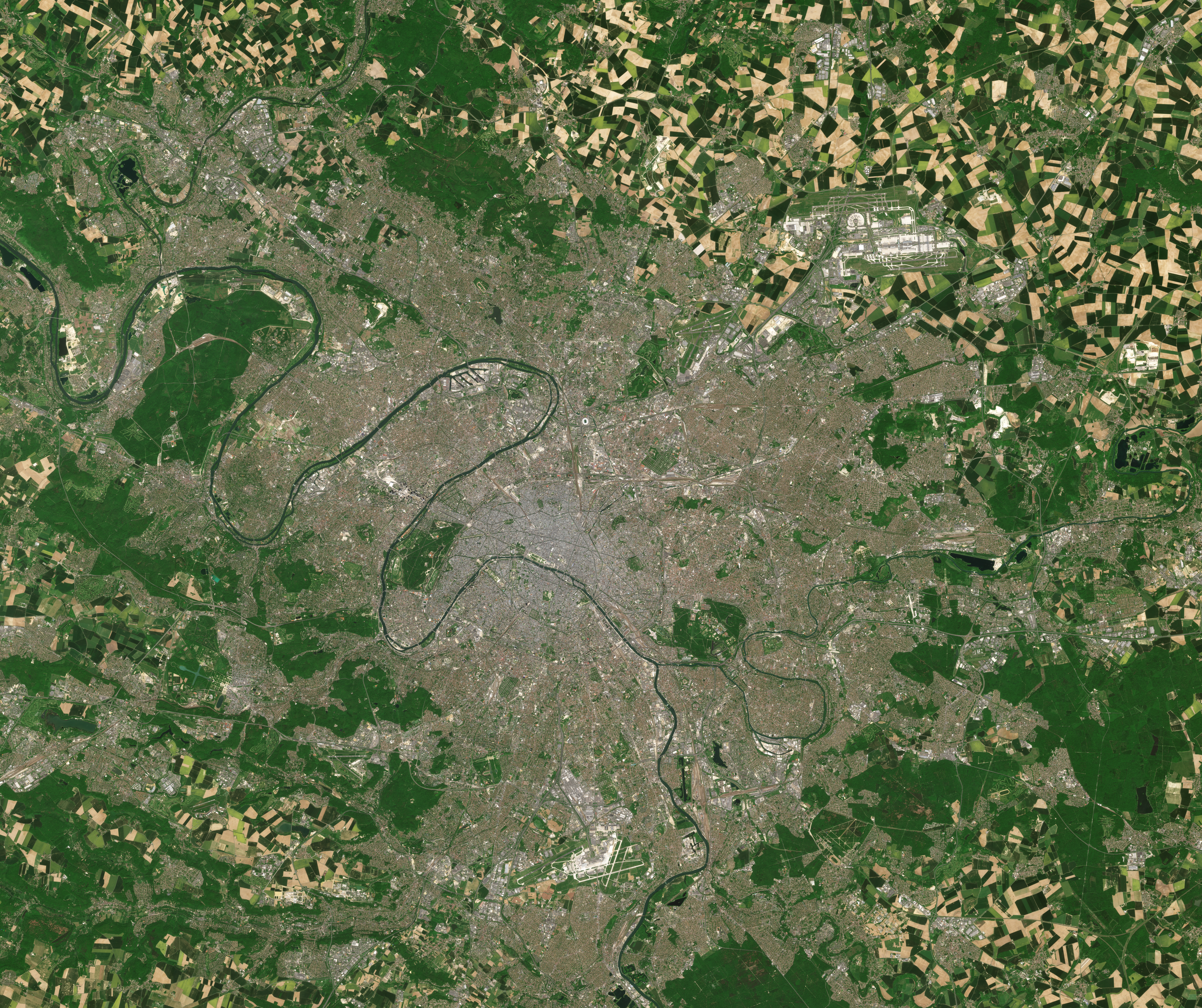
Sentinel-2 satellite image of Paris and surrounding area

The geography of Paris is characterised by the urbanisation of the area it lies within, and its position in the Petite Couronne, Grande Couronne, and Île-de-France.

== Location ==
Paris is located in northern central France. By road, it is 450 kilometres (280 mi) southeast of London, 287 kilometres (178 mi) south of Calais, 305 kilometres (190 mi) southwest of Brussels, 774 kilometres (481 mi) north of Marseille, 385 kilometres (239 mi) northeast of Nantes, and 135 kilometres (84 mi) southeast of Rouen. Paris is located in the north-bending arc of the river Seine and includes two islands, the Île Saint-Louis and the larger Île de la Cité, which form the oldest part of the city. The river's mouth on the English Channel (La Manche) is about 233 miles (375 km) downstream from the city. The city is spread widely on both banks of the river.

== Area ==
Excluding the outlying parks of Bois de Boulogne and Bois de Vincennes, Paris covers an oval measuring about 87 square kilometres (34 square miles) in area, enclosed by the 35-kilometre (22-mile) ring road, the Boulevard Périphérique. The city's last major annexation of outlying territories in 1860 not only gave it its modern form but also created the 20 clockwise-spiralling arrondissements (municipal boroughs). From the 1860 area of 78 km^{2} (30 sq mi), the city limits were expanded marginally to 86.9 km^{2} (33.6 sq mi) in the 1920s. In 1929, the Bois de Boulogne and Bois de Vincennes forest parks were officially annexed to the city, bringing its area to about 105 km^{2} (41 sq mi). The metropolitan area of the city is 2,300 km^{2} (890 sq mi).

== Climate ==
Paris has a typical Western European oceanic climate (Köppen climate classification: Cfb ) which is affected by the North Atlantic Current. The overall climate throughout the year is mild and moderately wet. Summer days are usually warm and pleasant with average temperatures between 15 and 25 °C (59 and 77 °F), and a fair amount of sunshine. Each year, however, there are a few days when the temperature rises above 32 °C (90 °F). Longer periods of more intense heat sometimes occur, such as the heat wave of 2003 when temperatures exceeded 30 °C (86 °F) for weeks, reached 40 °C (104 °F) on some days and seldom cooled down at night. Spring and autumn have, on average, mild days and fresh nights but are changing and unstable. Surprisingly warm or cool weather occurs frequently in both seasons. In winter, sunshine is scarce; days are cool, nights cold but generally above freezing with low temperatures around 3 °C (37 °F). Light night frosts are however quite common, but the temperature will dip below −5 °C (23 °F) for only a few days a year. Snow falls every year, but rarely stays on the ground. The city sometimes sees light snow or flurries with or without accumulation. Paris has an average annual precipitation of 641 mm (25.2 in), and experiences light rainfall distributed evenly throughout the year. However the city is known for intermittent abrupt heavy showers.

Paris has a rich history of meteorological observations, with some going back as far as 1665. The highest recorded temperature is 42.6 °C (108.7 °F) on 25 July 2019, and the lowest is −23.9 °C (−11.0 °F) on 10 December 1879. Furthermore, the warmest night on record is 27.5 °C (81.5 °F) on 27 June 1772 and the coldest day is −13.0 °C (8.6 °F) on 30 December 1788.

== Topography ==
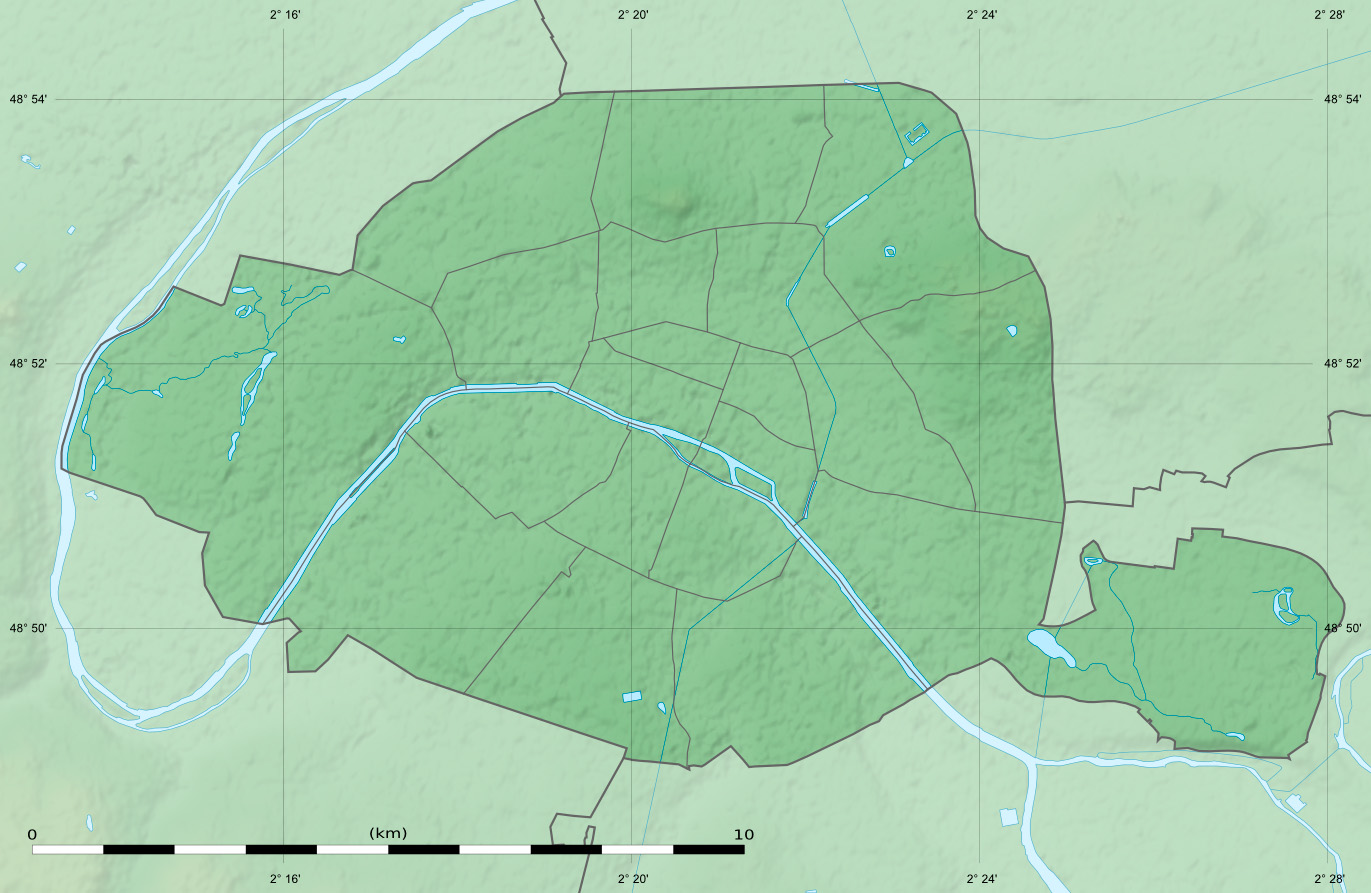
Physical map of Paris

The topography, or physical lay of the land, of Paris, the capital of France, is relatively flat, with an elevation of 35 m (115 ft) above sea level, but it contains a number of hills:

- Montmartre: 130 m (430 ft) above sea level (ASL). It was leveled in the 18th century.
- Belleville: 148 m (486 ft) ASL
- Menilmontant: 108 m (354 ft) ASL
- Buttes-Chaumont: 80 m (260 ft) ASL
- Passy: 71 m (233 ft) ASL
- Chaillot: 67 m (220 ft) ASL
- Montagne Sainte-Geneviève: 61 m (200 ft) ASL
- Butte-aux-Cailles: 62 m (203 ft) ASL
- Montparnasse: 66 m (217 ft) ASL

The highest elevation in the City of Paris is not, as often thought, on the hill of Montmartre, where the Basilica of Sacré-Cœur is located, but on the hill of Belleville on the rue du Télégraphe, which reaches 148 m (486 ft). In the greater urban area, the highest point is in the Forest of Montmorency (Val-d'Oise département), 19.5 km (12.1 mi) north-northwest of the center of Paris as the crow flies, at 195 metres (640 ft) above sea level.

The lowest elevation is 24 m (79 ft), indicated on the river Seine at the western city limits.

Paris lies in the so-called "Paris Basin," a low-lying continental shelf that over geologic time was occasionally submerged in ocean waters leaving behind marine sedimentary deposits (e.g., limestone, excavated from the underground "Quarries of Paris" and used to construct many of the city's buildings).

. When the region is above sea-level, as at the present time, rivers draining water from the land form, and these cut channels into the landscape. The rivers therefore strongly influence the topography of Paris. The Seine river cuts through Paris, but has apparently meandered in the past within a larger valley whose edges lie on the outskirts of the metropolitan area (the edges of this larger valley are visible from tall buildings in Paris). Many of the "hills" in Paris, appear to be formed as the result of cutoffs from previous meanders in the Seine river, which is now largely channelized to maintain its stability.

== Divisions ==
=== Arrondissements of Paris ===
The city of Paris is divided into twenty arrondissements municipaux, administrative districts, more simply referred to as arrondissements. These are not to be confused with departmental arrondissements, which subdivide the 101 French départements. The word "arrondissement", when applied to Paris, refers almost always to the municipal arrondissements.

The number of the arrondissement is indicated by the last two digits in most Parisian postal codes (75001 up to 75020).

== See also ==
- Geography of Île-de-France
