= Judicael =

Judicael or Judicaël is a Breton masculine given name. It may refer to:

- Saint Judicael (7th century), king of Domnonia and high king of Brittany
- Judicael, Duke of Brittany (9th century)
- Judicael Berengar (10th century), count of Rennes
- Judicaël Perroy

== See also ==
- Juhel, a French variant of the name
- Judicaëlle or Judicaelle is the feminine name
