= Butte-aux-Cailles =

Neighbourhood of Paris, France

Coordinates: 48°49′41″N 2°21′09″E

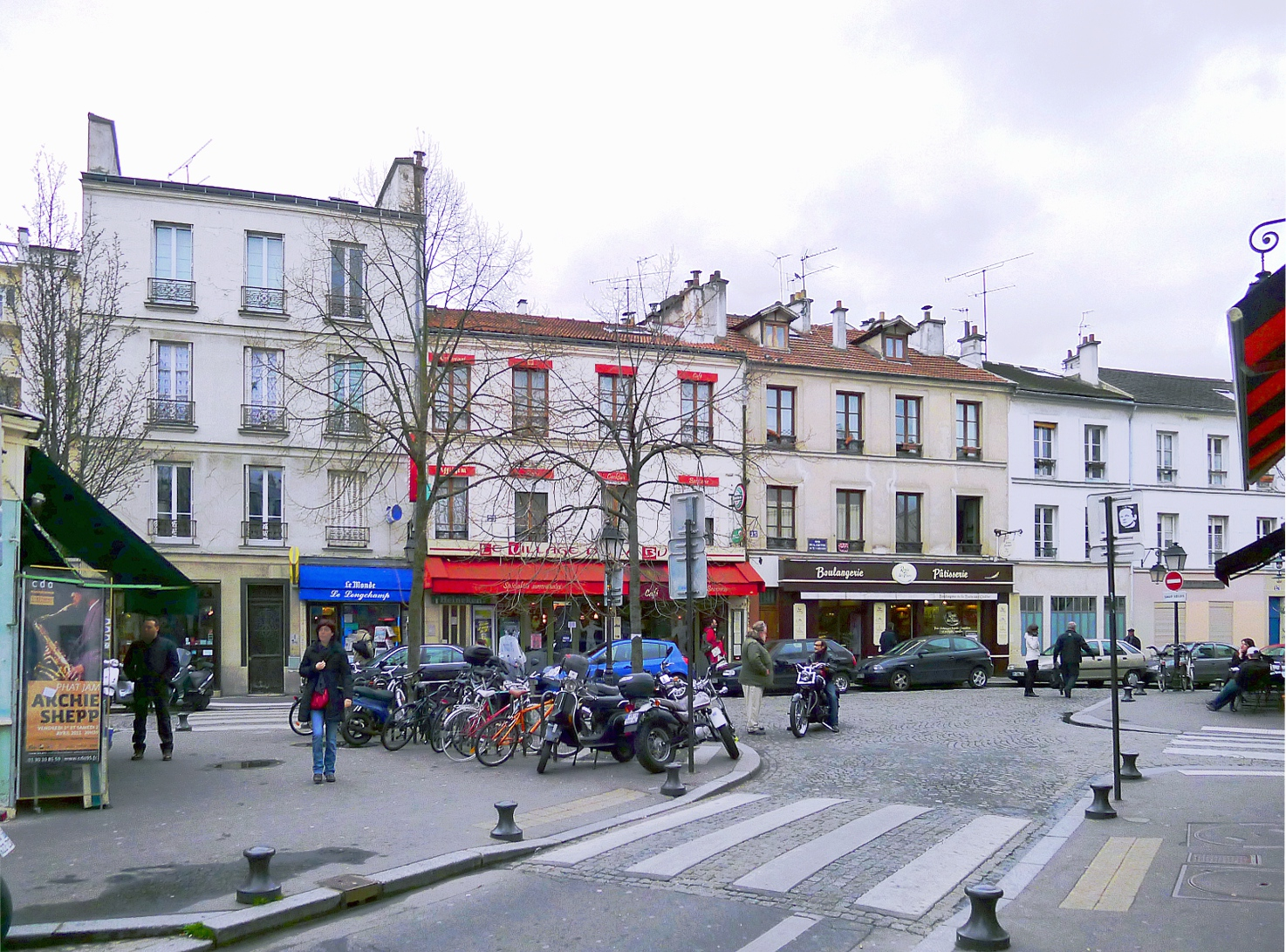
The summit of Butte-aux-Cailles in 2011.

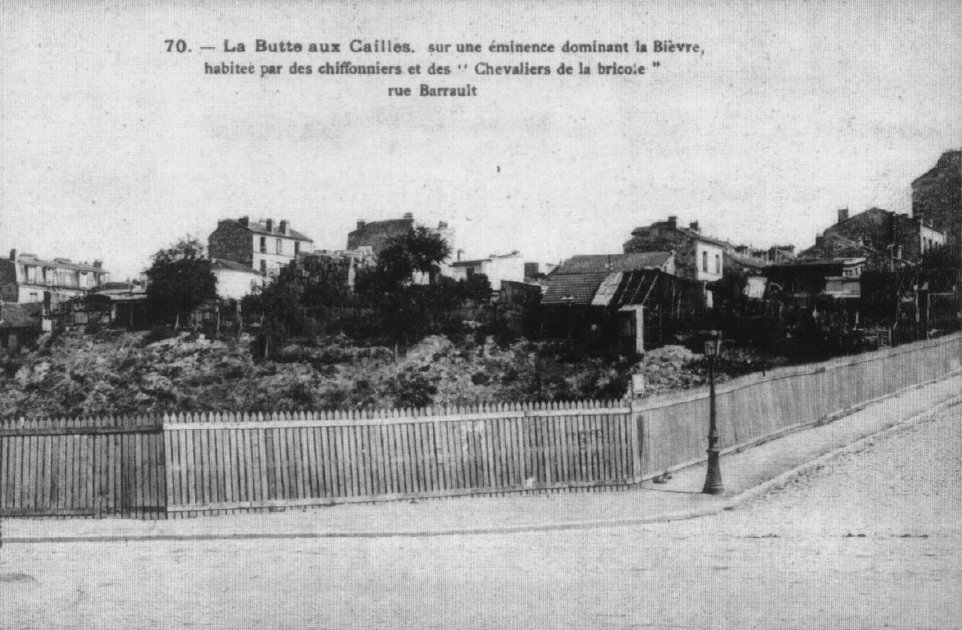
An old postcard showing the Butte-aux-Cailles

The Butte-aux-Cailles (French pronunciation: [byt o kaj] is a hilltop neighbourhood of Paris, France, located in Paris' south-eastern 13th arrondissement. The name of the hill could be translated as "quail hill", but it actually originates from its former landowner Pierre Caille, who bought a vineyard here in 1543. The Bièvre (from Latin 'Beaver') river, which once made this area important for the tannery and tissue trades, was covered over in 1860. Its route can be traced by following a series of bronze plaques embedded in the area's pavements.

Today, the Butte-aux-Cailles area draws together a young, trendy and festive Parisian population in its many small bars and restaurants. Since its incorporation into Paris along with the northern extremity of the now Paris-bordering Gentilly commune to which it belonged, the Butte-aux-Cailles has managed to retain much of its village ambiance. The area is noted for its street art, including work by the artists Miss.Tic and Jef Aérosol.
