= Pidapipo =

Restaurant information
- Established: 2013
- Owner: Lisa Valmorbida
- Food type: Gelato
- Location: 429-431 Brunswick St, Fitzroy VIC 3065

Pidapipo is an Australian gelateria in the suburb of Carlton in Melbourne, Victoria.

It is a 'micro-chain', with four locations in Melbourne, including one flagship store.

== Description ==
The design of the building has been described by the Financial Times as 'ebullient'. It has neon lights, and pink terrazzo floors. One of the store's most popular products is the nutella swirl. Some of the other gelato flavours are made with Australian cheeses and honeys.

The Carlton store sticks to serving gelato, which is made daily on-site. The Fitzroy store also serves desserts incorporating chocolate made at that store. The chocolate uses cacao imported from the Dominican Republic.

The Fitzroy store has a kitchen visible through three large windows, where passers-by can see chocolate being a made in a mirrored room. The location's stainless steel, glass, and electronic menu have been described as giving the location a 'lab feel'.

== History ==
The chain first started as a pop-up store, which after achieving some success opened as a Carlton store in 2013. In 2022, it opened a flagship store and test kitchen on Brunswick Street in Fitzroy. The franchise was founded by Lisa Valmorbida, member of the prominent Melbourne Valmorbida family.

== Reception ==
The Fitzroy store has been described by the Sydney Morning Herald's Emma Breheny as like 'if Willy Wonka's factory has been dropped in the middle of Fitzroy'.

In 2017 the business was criticised for launching two gendered gelato flavours. Dr Lauren Rosewarne of the University of Melbourne criticised the move, saying that the gendering of ice-cream is unnecessary. The flavour for men was 'salted caramel with milk chocolate & malt crum', while the flavour for women was the 'Strawberry rose with white choc & raspberry dust'. In response to the criticisms the shop removed the Instagram post promoting the flavours, saying: "We love creating delicious gelato to be enjoyed by everyone and if the collaboration gave the wrong impression we are sorry".
