= Valmorbida family =

Italian-Australian business family

The Valmorbida family is an Italian-Australian business family primarily based in Melbourne, Victoria.

The family is primarily known for their business interests, especially for their role in importing and popularising Italian food imports to Australia, a venture that was the initial source of their wealth built throughout the 20th century. In recent decades, the Valmorbidas have become one of Australia's most prominent families in Australian high society.

In more recent times, the family has had a number of business interests across Australia, especially in the State of Victoria. These interests include manufacturing, food distribution, wine growing, liquor distribution, property, and financial services.

The family's wealth is reportedly around $500m as of 2021.

== Description ==
=== Early history ===
The family's initial wealth was built by three brothers Carlo, Mariano, Tarcisio (Terry), and Saverio Valmorbida; who had migrated to Australian from Valli del Pasubio (VI) in northern Italy. Their first venture was the establishment of a continental grocery store Agostinos, which sold imported Mediterranean and continental food at a time when that food was not yet established in Australia.

In 1954 Carlo founded Conga Foods with Mariano and Saverio. Through this vehicle, the family became well known for being the primary importers of Lavazza coffee, La Gina canned tomatoes, Sirena Tuna, Moro and Val Verde olive oils, Green Valley olives, and Sol Mare tuna to Australia; particularly throughout the 1970s.

In 1980 the family bought the Mitchelton winery and under Carlo's son John Valmorbida developed it into a well-established winery. In the late 1980s the family invested in a Victorian cheese factory, Tylden Valley, and invested in a vegetable processing factory.

The family's main retail outlet as of the 1990s was the King & Godfree licensed delicatessen in the suburb of Carlton.

They also have had historical media interests, owning Italian-language Australian newspapers Il Globo, and La Fiamma, as well as the radio network Rete Italia; outlets that were founded after Terry went into publishing in 1959. They also have a stake in Goulburn Border Broadcasters, operating a radio network across regional Victoria.

In an interview with Business Review Weekly, John Valmorbida said of his family's rise, "My father was providing the Italian community with the food that they had left behind. His genius was that he understood that Australians would eventually eat those products as well. He opened up his shops to everybody."

=== Contemporary business interests ===
In contemporary times, the family maintains control of a string of businesses including Valcorp Fine Foods which is headed by John Valmorbida. Valcorp is the local distributor for brand names including Lavazza coffee, La Zuppa soup, La Gina tomatoes, Sirena tuna and Evian water. At some point John bought out Paul's stake in the Valcorp business.

They also own:

- Casama Group, the parent company of a collection of wine production (Joval), distribution companies (red + white, Mezzanine) and retailers; including the distribution of Shaw + Smith, Giant Steps and Plumm.
- BAM Logistics, a company specialised in providing temperature-controlled transport and storage.

As of 2021 the family's wealth is reportedly $500m. In 1990 the family's minimum net worth was estimated by the AFR as $60m; equivalent to $132,950,448 in 2022.

== Noteworthy members ==
The Valmorbida family are reported to generally keep a low profile.

Some of the more noteworthy members of the family include:

- Carlo Valmorbida, family patriarch and co-founder of Agostinos.
- John Valmorbida, son of Carlo. Head of Valcorp Fine Foods. Given task of running Goulburn Valley's Mitchelton Winery in 1978.
- Amanda Holmes a Court (née Valmorbida), daughter of John, and wife of Tim Holmes a Court.
- Jamie Valmorbida, former partner of Montana Cox, son of John.
- Lisa Valmorbida, cordon bleu chef, founder of gelateria micro-chain Pidapipo, daughter of John.
- Paul Valmorbida, son of Carlo, former partner of Tottie Goldsmith.
- David Valmorbida, Executive Chairman of Conga Foods, son of Saverio
- Andy Valmorbida, socialite, playboy, international art dealer, son of Paul. He made headlines in 2008 after his credit card was stolen by US oil heir Brandon Davis who had been cut off from his family fortune; as well as his parties with Paris Hilton and Lindsay Lohan. Made headlines again in 2021 after admitting to a US court he had forged documents to obtain loans against paintings that he did not actually own. Husband of Zara Simon, heiress to British retail magnate Peter Simon.
- PC Valmorbida, son of Paul, former partner of Theodora Richards.
- Mariano Valmorbida, family patriarch and co-founder of Agostinos.
- The late Adrian Valmorbida, property developer and son of Mariano. An inheritance dispute before Supreme Court justice Jim Delany involving his surviving children and widower Kairu Chan received headline reporting from The Age in 2021.
- Saverio Valmorbida, family patriarch and co-founder of Agostinos.
- Terry Valmorbida, family patriarch and co-founder of Agostinos.
- Michael Valmorbida, son of Terry, founder of Split Rock water.
- Julian Valmorbida-Paradiso, guitarist of Melbourne-based indie rock band Radio Free Alice .
