= Overpowered by Funk =

Song by the Clash

from the album Combat Rock
- Released: 14 May 1982
- Recorded: September 1981, Ear Studios, London and December 1981, Electric Lady Studios, NYC
- Genre: Funk; hip-hop
- Length: 4:53
- Label: CBS
- Songwriter: The Clash
- Producer: The Clash

"Overpowered by Funk" is a song by the English rock band the Clash from their fifth studio album, Combat Rock (1982).

The song features rapping vocals by graffiti artist Futura 2000, who had previously designed the sleeve for their "This Is Radio Clash" 7" single. Poly Mandell plays keyboard on this track.

== Writing, recording, and release ==
When we came to the U.S., Mick stumbled upon a music shop in Brooklyn that carried the music of Grand Master Flash and the Furious Five, the Sugar Hill Gang...these groups were radically changing music and they changed everything for us.

— Joe Strummer

White funk became prominent in London during the early 1980s with bands like the Jam, Spandau Ballet, and Haircut One Hundred. "Overpowered by Funk" was originally recorded at Ear Studios (also known as The People's Hall of Frestonia) in London in September 1981 by the four members of the band jointly with the rest of Combat Rock, using a mobile recording studio taken on loan from the Rolling Stones. In December 1981, they moved to New York City to complete the album. The recording sessions were carried out at the Electric Lady Studios, located at 52 West Eighth Street, in New York City's Greenwich Village, where Futura 2000 and Tommy Mandel, credited as Poly Mandell, provided their additional parts.

It was first released as a promotional recording in the United States and in Argentina, just before the release of the album. Combat Rock was released on 14 May 1982. An instrumental version of the song is featured on Hell W10, a black-and-white silent film written and directed by Joe Strummer. Hell W10 was filmed in the summer of 1983 and then included in The Essential Clash in 2003. The Argentinean promo of the song is featured on the 2006 compilation albums Singles Box. The album version is also featured on the 2000 re-mastered re-release of the album, and on the 2013 box sets Sound System and 5 Album Studio Set, newly re-mastered by Mick Jones from the original tapes.

=== Rock the Casbah promotional EP ===
Rock the Casbah

EP by The Clash
- Released: 1982
- Recorded: September 1981, Ear Studios, London; December 1981, Electric Lady Studios, NYC
- Length: 14:58
- Label: CBS
- Producer: The Clash

Rock the Casbah is a 12-inch vinyl promotional extended play published through CBS (catalog number: AS 1464) in the United States in 1982.

Track listing

All tracks are written by The Clash.

Side A
No.	Title	Lead vocals	Length
1.	"Rock the Casbah"	Joe Strummer	3:44
2.	"Overpowered by Funk"	Joe Strummer/Futura 2000	4:55

Side B
No.	Title	Lead vocals	Length
1.	"Should I Stay or Should I Go"	Mick Jones	3:06
2.	"Death Is a Star"	Joe Strummer/Mick Jones	3:13
Total length:			14:58

== Live performances ==
"Overpowered by Funk" was rarely played live, probably because of the presence of "The Magnificent Seven" and "This Is Radio Clash" in their live setlists. It was played and also recorded on some bootlegs during the nights at the Théâtre Mogador in the fifth district of Paris, between 24 and 30 September 1981, where the band was premiering various tracks from the upcoming Combat Rock.

== Reception and legacy ==
"Overpowered by Funk" has generally received positive reviews from music critics.

On his book The Clash: The Music that Matters, Tony Fletcher described the song as "a self-evident slice of hard-hitting Clash funk". Trouser Press' Ira Robbins viewed the track as a "rhythm-intensive [number]". David Fricke of Rolling Stone regarded the tune as a "locomotive disco steam". New Yorker author and political essayist Mitchell Cohen, in his review of Combat Rock for High Fidelity, considered "Overpowered by Funk" as an "aptly titled" song and describes it as a "razor-sharp swipe from The Book of (Rick) James", specifying both this song and "Red Angel Dragnet" "cover aspects of the New York City transit system". Jamie Atkins, a writer for Record Collector, described the song as "jittery" and views it as one of the experimentations which can be found on Combat Rock. Paste reviewer Douglas Heselgrave thought "Overpowered by Funk" was one of the most "radical and challenging [songs]" that the Clash have recorded during their musical career. Canadian Dimension' Arthur Fuller wrote that "'Overpowered by Funk' employs a funk rhythm track for another parade of unlikely imagery, reversing the usual funk retreat into sexuality and finally emerging as a critique of power." Marcus Gray, in his 2009 book Route 19 Revisited: The Clash and London Calling, stated that the song "finds Joe [Strummer] once again mocking a musical style even as the Clash play it […] it's "asinine, stupefying," apparently". Mike Maneval, who wrote for The Williamsport Sun-Gazette, considered the tune as "unadulterated funk", adding that it is "less neurotic and with more confidence than late Talking Heads and just shy of the funk pinnacle George Clinton and Parliament/Funkadelic." Brian Chin of Billboard provided a mixed review of the song; while he regarded "Overpowered by Funk" as a song with a "great rhythm track", he also believed this song "gets a bit wordy". Uncut's Gavin Martin provided a negative review for "Overpowered by Funk", considering the "half-cocked rap" of the song as a "Sandinista!-style failed [experiment]".

"Overpowered by Funk" inspired MGMT's "Time to Pretend", a song listed on Rolling Stone's list of "The 500 Greatest Songs of All Time", and on NME's list of "The 500 Greatest Songs of All Time".

== Personnel ==
The Clash

- Joe Strummer – lead vocal, rhythm guitar
- Mick Jones – backing vocal, lead guitar, rhythm guitar
- Paul Simonon – bass guitar
- Topper Headon – drums

Additional musicians

- Futura 2000 – rapping
- Tommy Mandel (as Poly Mandell) – keyboards

Production

- The Clash – producers
- Glyn Johns – chief engineer, mixing
- Joe Blaney, Jerry Green, Eddie Garcia – assistant engineers
