= Hervé Di Rosa =

French painter

Hervé Di Rosa (born 1959 in Sète, Hérault) is a French painter.

Born in Sète, France, Hervé Di Rosa is a French painter who brings to life unique characters who populate his work in the form of paintings, sculptures, installations and animations. His style is similar to that of American artists Haring, Basquiat, Scharf and incorporates influences from graffiti and comic books. Di Rosa is a key figure in the "Figuration Libre" movement of French painters. His work is often humorous and brash and shows his passion for kitsch or "Art Modeste." In 2000, Di Rosa built a museum dedicated to Modest Art in Sète, France. In August 2006 he had a show of his work at the Bass Museum in Miami. He shows regularly with the Gallery Haim-Chanin in New York and Louis Carré et Cie. in Paris.

== Controversy ==
In April 2019, controversy arose over a 1991 Di Rosa mural at the French Parliament which features two stereotypical blackface figures. The mural, meant to commemorate the 1794 abolition of slavery in France, was characterized as humiliating and dehumanizing by Mame-Fatou Niang of Carnegie Mellon and the French author Julien Suaudeau who launched a petition calling for the mural's removal. The mural had come to Niang's attention when it was tweeted to her by a French schoolgirl. Di Rosa responded to the criticism saying “These two people allow themselves to accuse me of racism [and] have the nerve to act as spokespeople for the millions of victims [of slavery] and want to censor the work,” and accepted no responsibility for any offense caused by the work nor acknowledged that it could even be honestly perceived as racist.

== Selected exhibitions ==
- 1981 Eva Keppel Gallery, Düsseldorf, Swart Gallery, Amsterdam. - « Ateliers 81-82 » ARC, Musée d'Art Moderne de la Ville de Paris.
- 1982 New York, « Statements New York 82, Leading contemporary artists from France », Holly Solomon Gallery: first encounter with Keith Haring, Tseng Kwong Chi, Kenny Scharf, Nicolas Moufarrege. Gillespie-Laage-Salomon Gallery, Paris.
- 1983 « Villa Medici hors les murs » PS1 New York. « Blanchard, Boisrond, Combas, Di Rosa », Groninger Museum, Groningen. Barbara Gladstone Gallery, New York. Tony Shafrazi Gallery, New York.
- 1995 Louis Stern Fine Arts, West Hollywood, and Galerie Louis Carré & Cie, Paris, Hervé di Rosa: Paintings and Works on Paper, Absolut LA Invitational Biennial.
