= Ben Drury =

British freelance designer

Ben Drury (born 4 January 1972), is a British freelance designer.

He was art director of Mo' Wax recordings and has worked extensively in the music industry, creating album artwork for Turin Brakes and Dizzee Rascal, among others. Drury maintains long-term creative collaborations with James Lavelle of Mo' Wax and Singapore-based clothing label Surrender & Will Bankhead, also formerly of Mo' Wax, and currently the cult T-shirt company, Answer. Drury worked closely with artist Futura 2000 designing a compilation of his work, entitled “Futura”, published in 2000 by Booth-Clibborn Editions. In 2006, he collaborated with Nike to produce the "Air U Breathe" Air Max 1 Premium training shoe and Windrunner jacket. In December 2009, he rebooted the partnership to create the Nike Air Max 90 Current “Silent Listener".
