= Andy Valmorbida =

Entrepreneur

Andy Valmorbida is a fine art businessman. He is president of Untitled-1 Holdings and founded River-Labs, a company in the generative art movement.

Valmorbida became known as the "King of Pop Up" after organizing 45 pop-up art exhibitions in 12 different countries, primarily featuring street art. Notable artists, such as Richard Hambleton, Futura, Jean-Michel Basquiat, and Francis Bacon, had works exhibited in these shows.

== Early life ==
Valmorbida was born in July 1978 into a wealthy family in Melbourne, Australia and was raised in New York City, United States. His father is Paul Valmorbida, an Australian businessman and son of Carlo Valmorbida. Andy Valmorbida studied business and began his career at the Valmorbida family's investment firm in New York.

== Career ==
At 25, Valmorbida transitioned from Wall Street to street art. He met artist Richard Hambleton in 2009, which led to a collaboration with Vladimir Restoin Roitfeld in 2011 promoting Hambleton's art. Giorgio Armani, an avid collector of Hambleton's work, sponsored several "pop up" celebrity attended art shows exhibiting the works.

Valmorbida acted as executive producer on the 2017 documentary Shadowman, reflecting Hambleton's life and career.

In 2010, Valmorbida helped with the curation and donation of two Hambleton pieces to the amfAR, The Foundation for AIDS Research 17th Annual Cinema Against AIDS Gala During the Cannes Film Festival. The pieces sold for $920,000.

=== Legal Issues ===
In September 2021, Valmorbida was involved in a legal dispute regarding accusations of fraud and alleged efforts to conceal his tax residence, leading to his case being referred to Jersey's attorney general. Valmorbida admitted to creating and using fraudulent documents.

== Personal life ==
In his earlier life, Valmorbida was noted as a socialte, having made headlines in 2008 for his credit card being stolen by oil industrialist Brandon Davis, who had been cut off from his family fortune, and for partying with people including Paris Hilton.

Valmorbida has two children.
