= Robert Combas =

French painter and sculptor

Robert Combas (born 25 May 1957 in Lyon) is a French painter and sculptor.

== Biography ==
He lives and works in Paris. He is widely recognized as a progenitor of the figuration libre movement that began in Paris around 1980 as a reaction to the art establishment in general and minimalism and conceptual art in particular.

Figuration libre is often regarded as having roots in Fauvism and Expressionism and is linked to contemporary movements such as Bad Painting and Neo-expressionism. It draws on pop cultural influences such as graffiti, cartoons and rock music in an attempt to produce a more varied, direct and honest reflection of contemporary society, often satirizing or critiquing its excesses.

Combas’ own work has always been strongly rooted in depictions of the human figure. The figures are often in wild, violent or orgiastic settings. Usually on large, often unstretched canvases, Combas crowds his flat pictorial space with a teeming proliferation of bodies, street poetry and designs reminiscent of the compulsive patterning in much folk and outsider art. He creates hectic narratives of war, crime, sex, celebration and transgression—in short, every phase that makes up the constant flux of modern life. In recent years a strong autobiographical strain has been evident in his work, which was present only on a subliminal level, if at all, in the earlier work.

Combas often seems to be offering the work as critique—of both the art establishment and society at large. The recent painting “I am greedy man” features a densely layered jostle of bodies, with the foreground dominated by transparent line figures, the background occupied by monochromatic figures and the middle ground reserved for two more fully realized figures, one in a business suit and the other muscular and shirtless. They dance in a swirl of text which seems to have no discernible beginning or end but which may be read as: “I am greedy man/ Please shout me babe/ Soul serenade is a lot of pussy/ Pussy gone on the Eiffel Tower/ My Eiffel Tower is long and large.” The lampoon of a society where all are anonymous except in the individual recognition of need and gratification is typical of Combas’ work throughout his career.

While Combas’ works often seem to carry an element of shock or confrontation, he insists the images are meant to engage the viewer, and their execution in vibrant color and bold, unfettered line communicate a spirit of proletarian camaraderie that offsets the tendency to overwhelm, in the larger works especially.

In a biographical note on Robert Combas’ official website the artist asserts his aim is to

“provoke, that is, to trigger a reaction in the spectator only to ‘invite’ him, beckoning him in and whispering in his ear ‘come over and talk to me, I want to tell you about the stupidity, violence, beauty, love, hatred, seriousness and fun, the logic and senselessness that pervade our day-to-day lives’ ”.
