= Juhel =

Juhel is a French masculine given name derived from Judicael. It may refer to:

- Juhel of Totnes
- Juhel de Mayenne
  - Juhel I de Mayenne
  - Juhel II de Mayenne
  - Juhel III de Mayenne

== See also ==
- Judicael, a variant of the name
- Villaines-la-Juhel
