= Ad Dekkers (artist) =

Dutch sculptor (1938–1974)

Adriaan "Ad" Dekkers (Nieuwpoort, South Holland, 21 March 1938 – Gorinchem, 27 February 1974) was a Dutch artist mostly known for his reliefs involving simple geometrical forms.

Dekkers was born to Hendrik Pieter Dekkers, a school principal, and Anna Elizabeth Berdina Godtschalk. Adrian attended his father's school and also received training as a decorative painter. Between 1954 and 1958 he studied at the Willem de Kooning Academy in Rotterdam where he was mostly engaged in drawing of landscapes and still images. In February 1960 Dekkers entered military service, and in December 1961 married Machelina Hendrika van Bruggen, with whom he had one son.

From the early 1960s Dekkers became dissatisfied with painting and focused on reliefs, mostly made of plastic. By 1968 he was recognized as a master in this area and started creating monumental sculptures and reliefs in architectural environment. His works became accepted at major international exhibitions, such as the Biennale de Paris in 1965, São Paulo Art Biennial in 1967 and documenta in Kassel in 1968. He also had a number of solo exhibitions in the Netherlands. After his death in 1974, his works were exhibited in Eindhoven and Düsseldorf and placed in museums in the Netherlands, Belgium, Denmark, Germany, England and the United States.

== Works ==
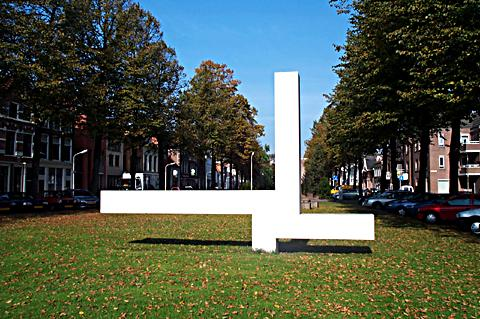
A sculpture in Gorinchem

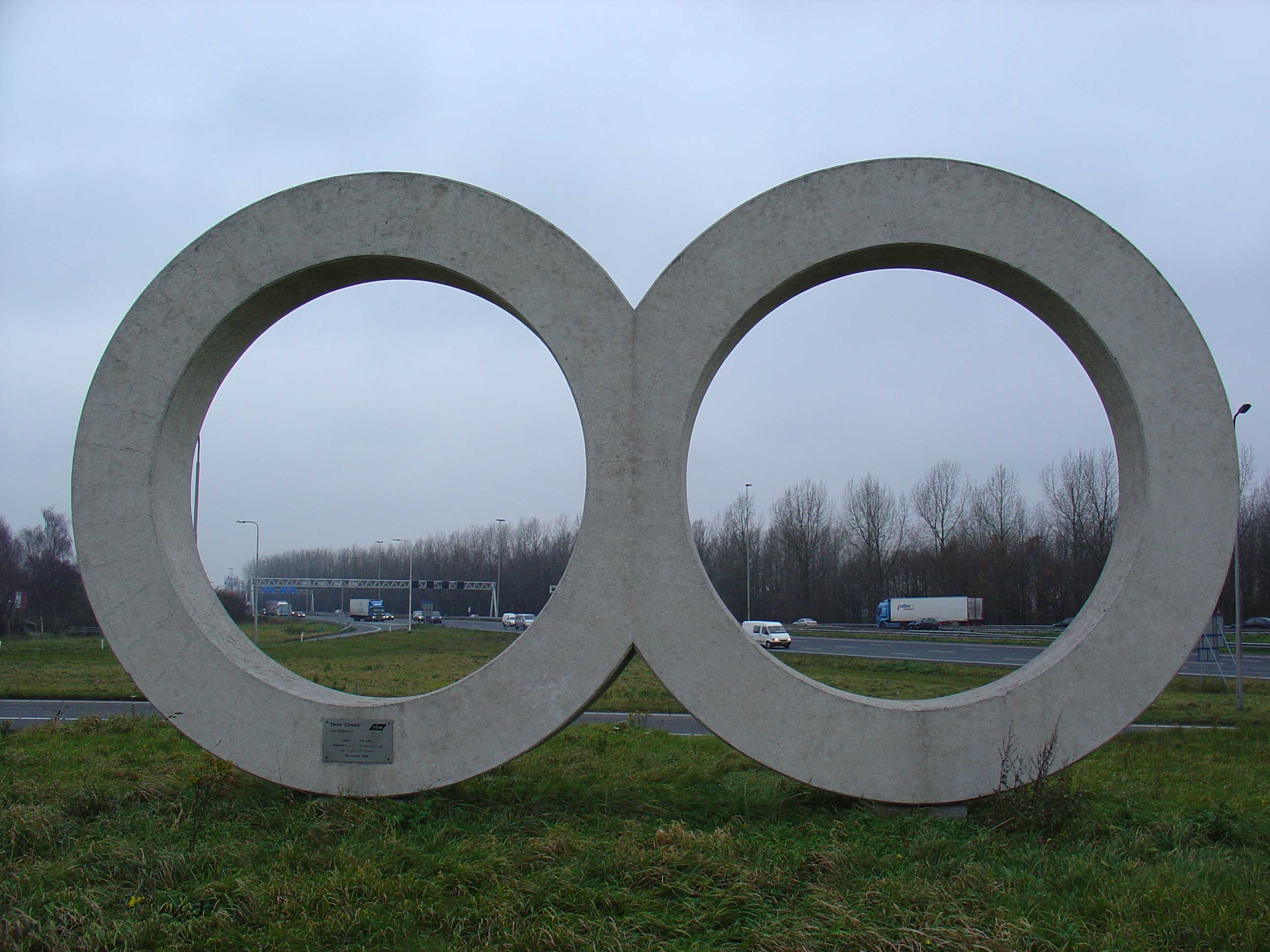
Two circles at the A12 highway near Gouda

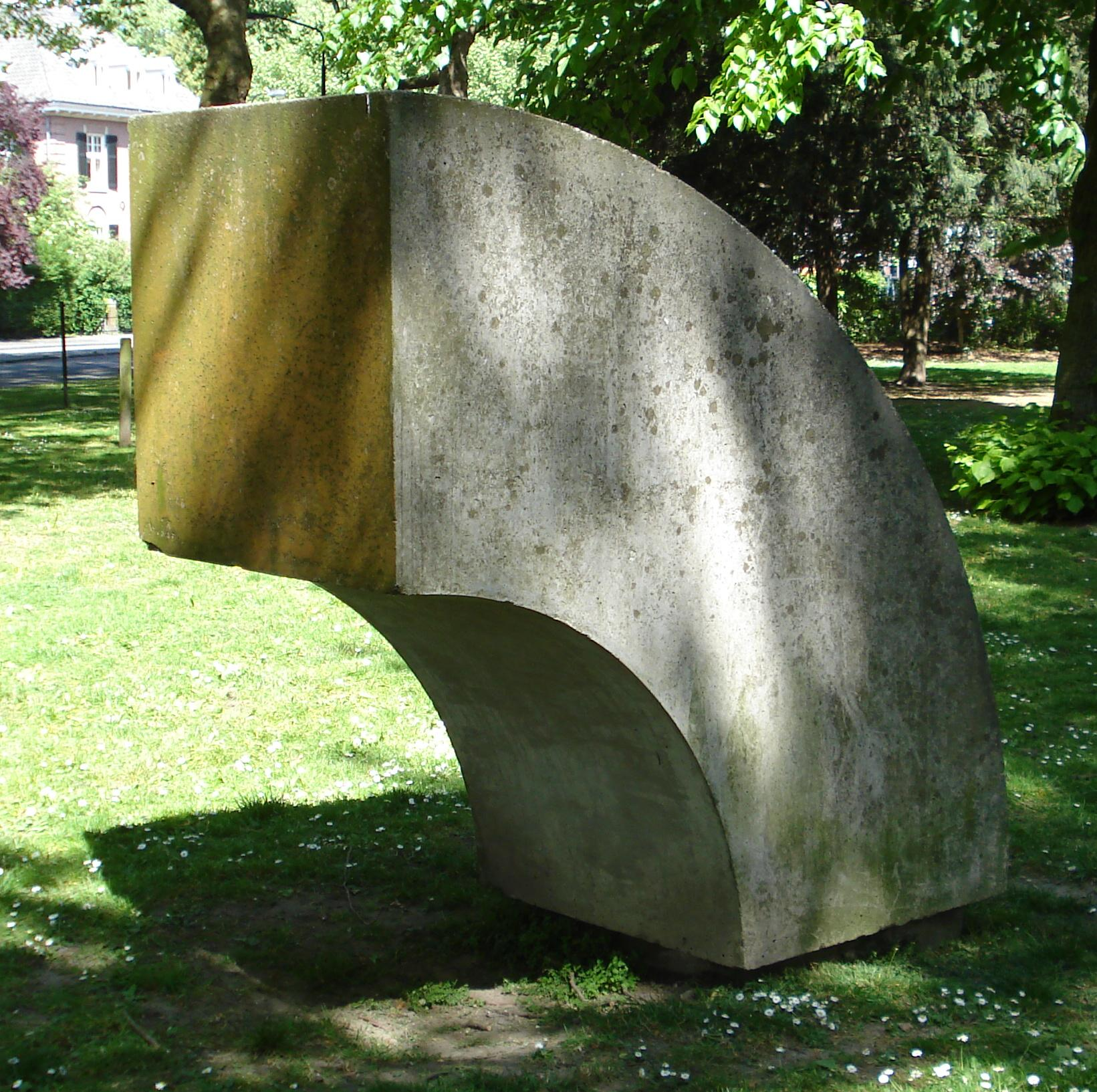
Quarter circle in Dordrecht

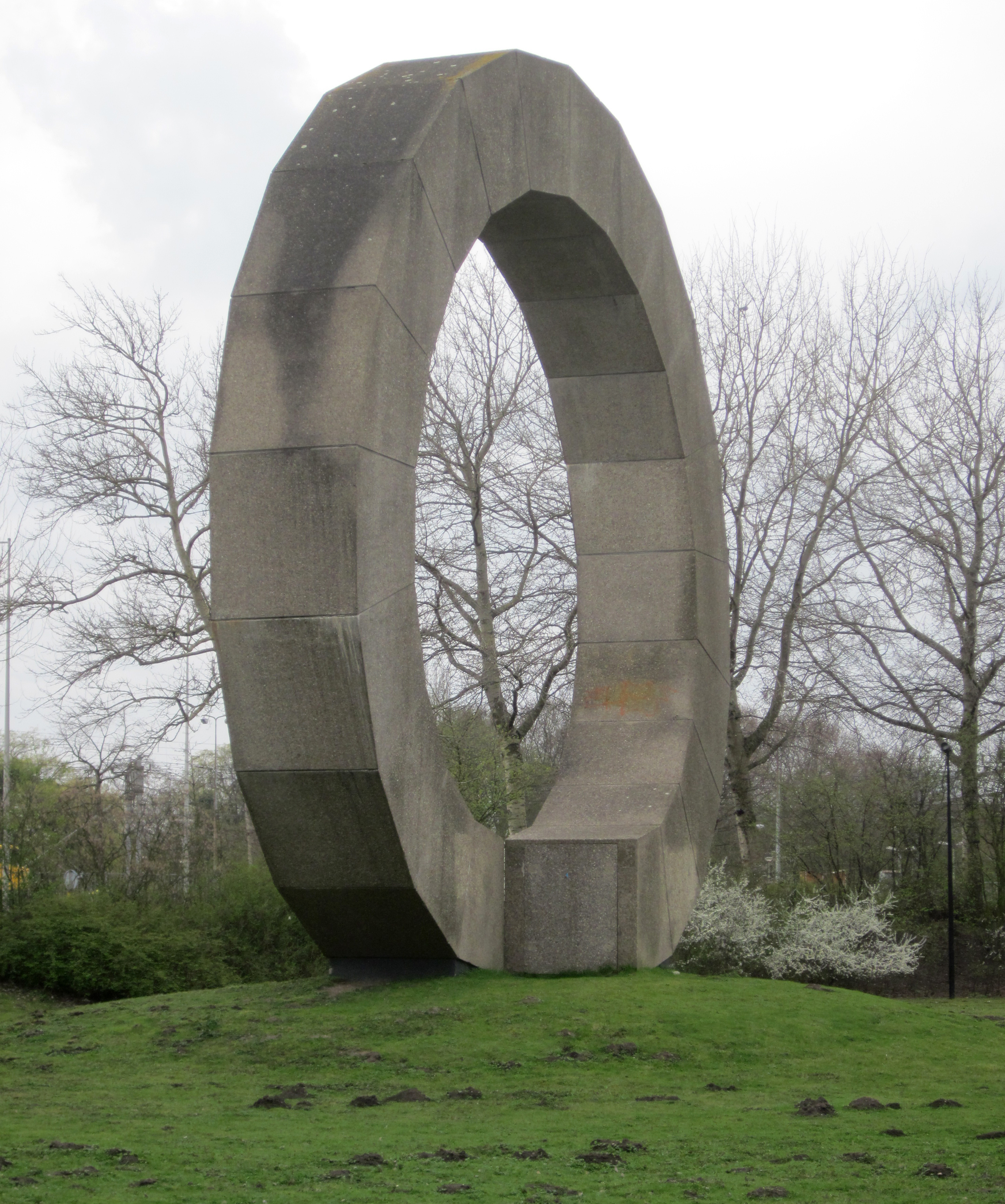
Broken circle in Amsterdam
