= Kim Prisu =

French painter

- Born: Joaquim António Gonçalves Borregana; November 15, 1962 (age 63); Sabugal, Second Portuguese Republic
- Style: Figuration Libre; French street art
- Website: Kim Prisu on Instagram

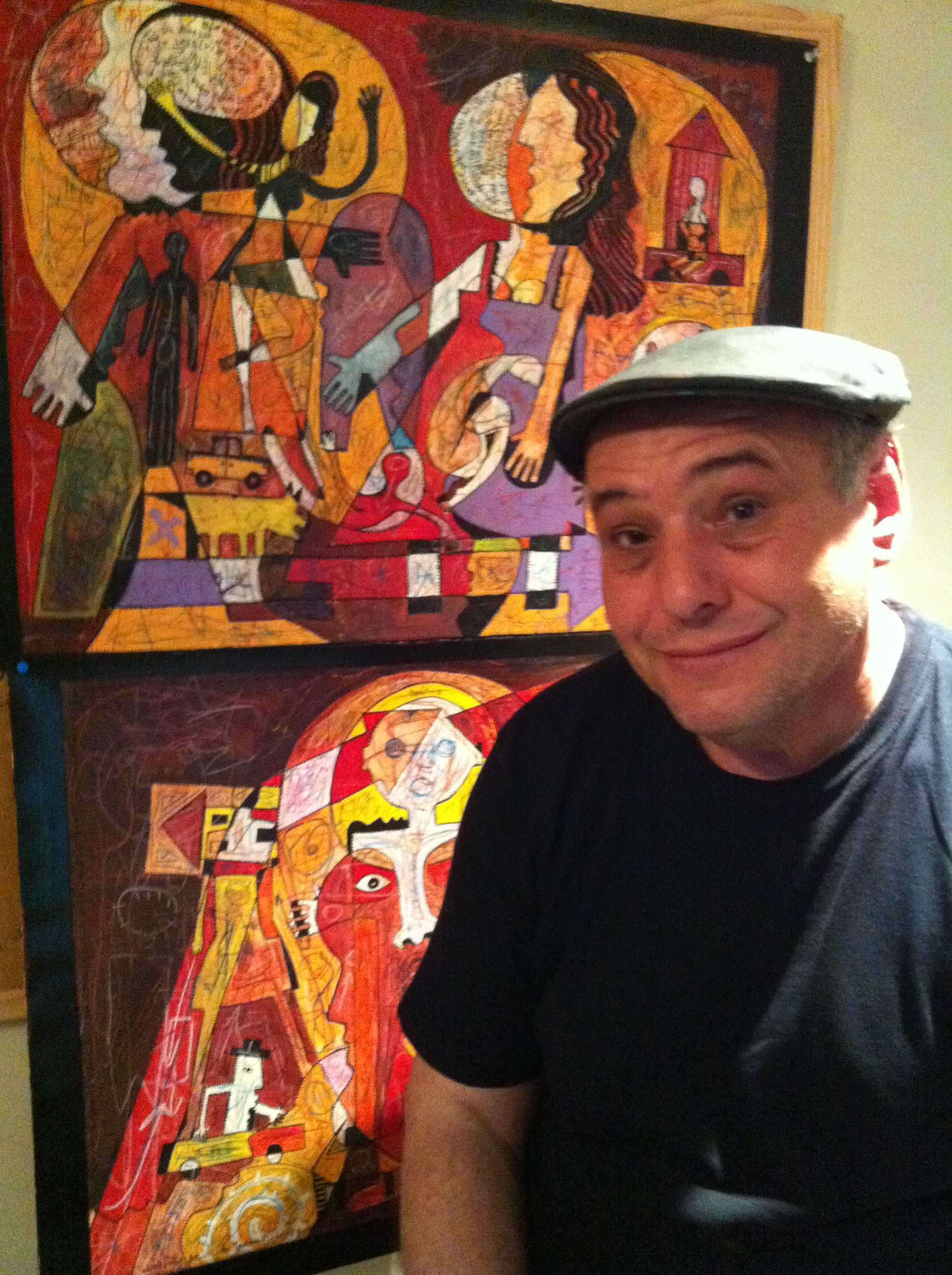
Portuguese and French Artist Joaquim Antonio Goncalves Borregana known as Kim Prisu 2015 Miramar Fl USA

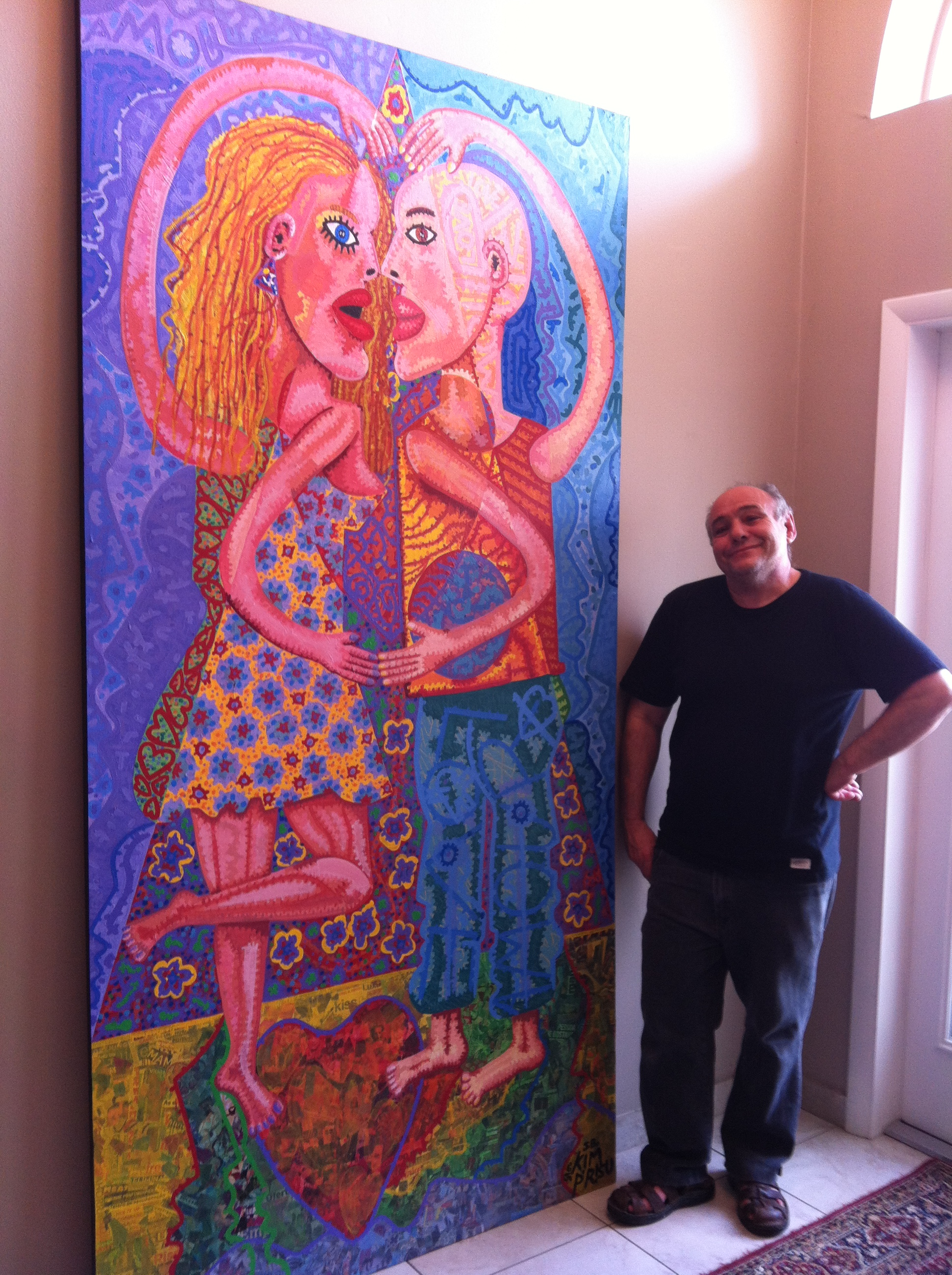
Artist Joaquim Antonio Goncalves Borregana known as KIM PRISU AT MIRAMAR FLORIDA 2015

Kim Prisu is the pseudonym of the Portuguese and French painter Joaquim António Gonçalves Borregana (born 15 November 1962). After 34 years in France, he once again lives in Portugal. His work combines Figuration Libre, French street art of the 1980s, digital imaging and Art singulier.

== Early life and education ==
Born in Aldeia da Dona, Sabugal, Portugal, he moved to France in 1963 and was educated there. He began making art at the age of 12 with comic strips.

== Career ==
In 1977, he started hanging out in Paris, initially interested in rock and other urban music. Not being interested in making music himself, he started promoting friends' groups with hand-made posters that he had photocopied, and also by stencilling groups' names.

In 1979, at the invitation of his drawing instructor, he had his first group show, and the same year with Joaquim Pereira he founded the group "Explorateurs du gris". In 1980 he came up with the concept of Nuklé-Art, global interdisciplinary art for the children of the Nuclear Age; in 1984 this led to his co-founding the group of the same name with Kriki (Christian Vallée) and Paul Etherno. The group dissolved in mid-1987 into the Médias-Peintres, whose activities are close to those of Figuration Libre, including street stencilling, postering of painted work and performance art. Nuklé-Art exhibited at gallery Patras and the Galerie Photo graffitis, participated in the first Binoche sale, the 1986 Les jeunes débarquent and are in the book Pochoir a la Une and in Jacques Renard's film Murmures Impatiens in the series Paris impromptu.

In 1990, he painted on the Berlin Wall, on 9 of the 1,300 meters that remain and make up the East Side Gallery. He painted there again in 2009 to celebrate the 20th anniversary of the fall of the wall.

In the 1990s he exhibited at Paris galleries including Anne Rouff, Christophe, and the galerie sanguine. In 1996 he returned to Portugal.

Newspaper Publications in Capeia Arraiana, Portugal

Today he also works on public art sculptures made from materials of recycling, performance art painting, conceptual and gestural, posters, illustration books, digital and video art, graffiti and stenciling, as well as the tradition of the plastic arts and in azulejos, theatre and Inpensamental poetry. He is a corresponding academic of FEBACLA in Brazil.
