= Blek le Rat =

French graffiti artist (born 1952)

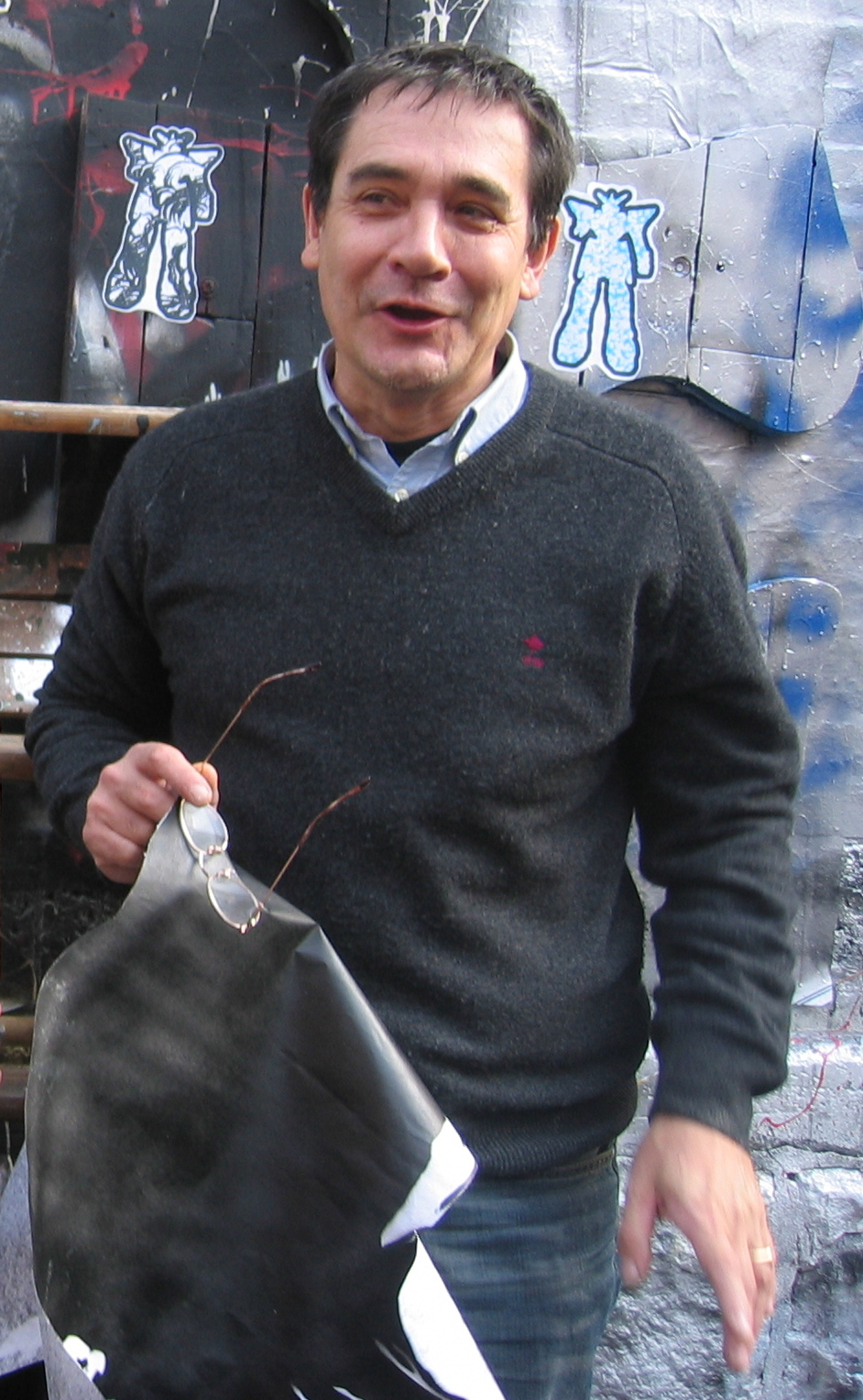
- Portrait of Blek le Rat by Martha Cooper, 2006
- Born: Xavier Prou; 1952 (age 73–74); Paris, French Fourth Republic
- Education: Beaux-Arts de Paris; École nationale supérieure d'architecture de Paris-La Villette
- Known for: Stencilling
- Style: Street art
- Movement: Graffiti
- Website: blekleratoriginal.com

Blek le Rat (pronounced [blɛk lə ʁa]; born Xavier Prou, 1952) is a French graffiti artist. He was one of the first graffiti artists in Paris, and has been described as the "Father of stencil graffiti".

== Early life ==
Xavier Prou was born on 15 November 1951 in Boulogne-Billancourt in the western suburbs of Paris.

== Early career and influence ==
Initially influenced by the early graffiti-art of New York City after a visit in 1971, he chose a style which he felt better suited Paris, due to the differing architecture of the two cities. He has also recognised the influence of Canadian artist Richard Hambleton, who painted large-scale human figures in the 1980s. In 1985 he was at the first meeting of the graffiti and urban art movement in Bondy (France), an event initiated by the Vive La Peinture collective.

His name originates from the comic book Blek le Roc, using "rat" as an anagram for "art".

Blek began his artwork in 1981, painting stencils of rats on the walls of Paris streets. He described the rat as "the only free animal in the city", and one which "spreads the plague everywhere, just like street art".

Blek's oldest preserved street art graffito, a 1991 replica of Caravaggio's Madonna di Loreta, which he dedicated to his future wife Sybille, was rediscovered behind posters on a house wall in Leipzig, Germany, in 2012.

French authorities identified Blek in 1991 when he was arrested while stencilling a replica of Caravaggio's Madonna and Child, with the connection to Blek and his artwork being made by police. From that point on, he has worked exclusively with pre-stenciled posters, citing the speedier application of the medium to walls, as well as lessened punishment should he be caught in the act.

In 2006 he began his series of images representing the homeless, which depict them standing, sitting, or lying on sidewalks, in attempts to bring attention to what he views as a global problem.

== Influence on other artists ==
He has had a great influence on today's graffiti-art and "guerilla-art" movements, the main motivation of his work being social consciousness and the desire to bring art to the people. Many of his pieces are pictorials of solitary individuals in opposition to larger, oppressive groups.

Bristol graffiti artist Banksy has received much inspiration from Blek le rat's work and it has been commented that "At a time when graffiti was still largely dominated by lettering and tags inspired by the New York subway movement, Blek introduced figurative stencil art to the streets of Europe. His intervention proved revolutionary. The stencil allowed complex images to be executed rapidly, reducing the time spent illegally painting in public spaces while making the work instantly recognizable. Banksy would later adopt and refine this very technique, turning it into one of the defining visual languages of contemporary street art.

It has also been reported that Banksy once said that "Every time I think I've painted something slightly original, I find out that Blek le Rat has done it as well, only 20 years earlier."

Banksy and Blek have expressed mutual desire for collaboration and in 2011 Blek was seen adding to a mural that had been begun by Banksy the previous year in the Mission District of San Francisco.

== Opinions ==
Blek is sceptical of the modern art scene, saying in a 2012 interview: "The art world is a big mess," he says. "Nobody cares who is a real artist. It is all about cheating people out of money."

== Exhibitions ==
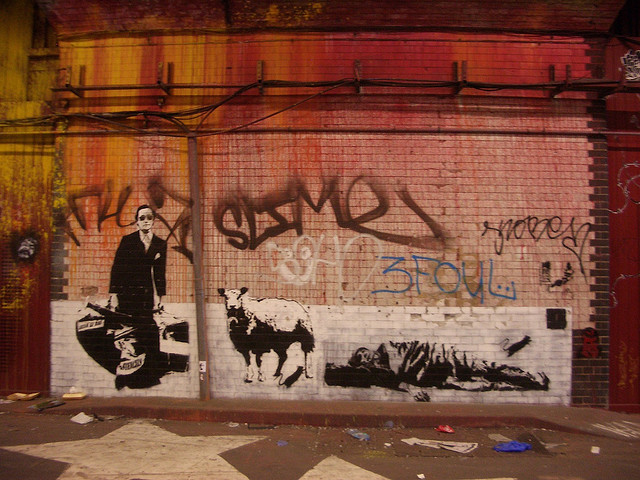
Blek le Rat, London, 2008

In October 2006, Blek le Rat had his first solo U.K. exhibition in London at the Leonard Street Gallery. He participated in the Cans Festival in 2008, which featured outdoor street stencil painting in Waterloo, London.

His American gallery debut took place at Subliminal Projects Gallery in Los Angeles in 2008. It included paintings, silkscreen, and three-dimensional artwork, as well as photography from his wife, Sybille Prou.

Blek also had an exhibition in December 2009 at the Metro Gallery in Melbourne, a centre of street art in Australia. The exhibition entitled "Le Ciel Est Bleu, La Vie Est Belle" (The sky is blue, life is beautiful), featured wooden panels, canvas, screen-print, and photographs, tracing the artist's oeuvre from the early 1980s to the present.

Blek le Rat has nonetheless expressed preference for the streets over galleries, stating the integrity of an artist is to be seen by as many people as possible, not being sold or recognized in a museum.

In 2014, Blek le Rat exhibited 3 large-scale original paintings and an edition of 25 unique monotypes with lithography in a setting that bridges these traditional spaces—the Quin hotel in New York City—as part of the hotel's Quin Arts program. The artist created the lithographs at the New York Academy of Art during his tenure as artist in residence at the Quin hotel. Collectively entitled "Escaping Paris", the exhibit was curated by DK Johnston of The Arts Fund. The Quin's permanent collection also includes Blek le Rat's "Love America" on the 14th floor and loaned works the "Great Wedding" on the second floor, "What Has Been Seen Cannot Be Unseen" in the boardroom, and "Tango" in the lobby. Most recently, Blek le Rat commemorated this collaboration on the Quin's façade with an image of Andy Warhol.

== See also ==
- Banksy
- Shepard Fairey
- Tavar Zawacki
- King Robbo
- List of urban artists
- Street art
