= Harold Hunter Foundation =

Non-profit skateboarding organization

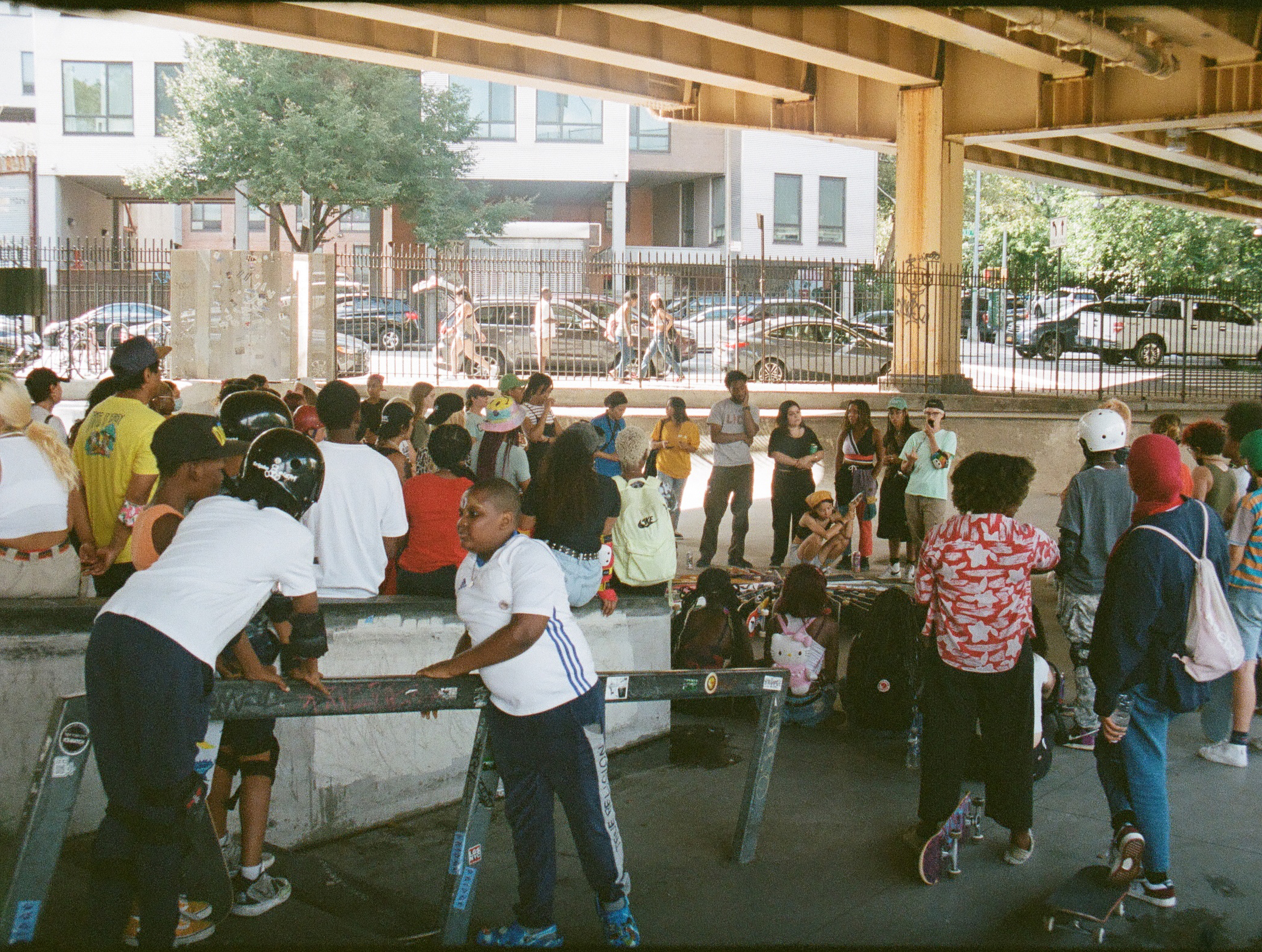
Women's Skate Jam hosted by Harold Hunter Foundation (HHF) at Golconda Skatepark

Harold Hunter Foundation (HHF) is a nonprofit organization founded in 2007 in honor of professional skateboarder Harold Hunter. It is dedicated to improving the skateboarding community of New York City and beyond by supporting and promoting access to skateboarding for underserved youth.

== History ==
The Harold Hunter Foundation was created in 2007 by Ron Hunter, the brother of Harold Hunter, following Harold Hunter’s passing in 2006. The foundation was established to honor Harold’s life, values, and influence within the New York City skateboarding community and to provide structured support and opportunities for underserved youth.

In 2010 Jessica Forsyth led the effort to formalize the foundation’s mission, grounding it in Harold Hunter’s lived experience and community impact. Drawing on the support of family members, close friends, and the broader NYC skate community, the foundation was organized as a nonprofit with a focus on youth development, mentorship, and access through skateboarding.

The creation of the Harold Hunter Foundation was rooted in preserving Harold Hunter’s legacy not as a commercial brand, but as a community-driven initiative centered on empowerment, inclusion, and positive pathways for young people. Since its founding, the foundation has served as a platform to extend Harold Hunter’s influence beyond skateboarding, emphasizing education, personal growth, and community engagement.

== Programs ==
=== Skate Camp Scholarship Program ===
Beginning in 2007, the Harold Hunter Foundation set out to offer scholarships to inner city kids to go to Woodward Camp. Hunter loved the camp when he went, not as a camper, but as a visiting am and pro. By developing a Woodward scholarships program, the HHF set out to extend this opportunity to go to skateboarding camp to underserved youth who might not otherwise have the chance. Since the beginning of the program, the HHF has expanded its scholarships to other skate camps, granting more than 200 need-based scholarships for NYC youth to attend skate camps, including Camp Woodward, the Element YMCA Skate Camp, and the Homage Skateboard Academy.

Harold Hunter Day is an annual community event organized by the Harold Hunter Foundation to honor the life, legacy, and cultural impact of Harold Hunter. The day serves as both a remembrance and a living continuation of Harold’s influence on skateboarding, youth culture, and community life in New York City.

=== Education Initiatives ===
The HHF programming has expanded beyond offering skate camp scholarships. The HHF now provides a spectrum of community programming and educational experiences geared towards underserved communities.

==== Panels - HHF in the Classroom ====
HHF brings skateboarding professionals including Chad Muska, Luis Tolentino, Rodney Smith, Steve Rodriguez, Donny Barley, and others into classroom settings to speak to a range of audiences from school assemblies to selected mentee groups of talented skaters to students with behavioral issues.

==== KICKFLIP Digital Media Training Program ====
The Kickflip Digital Media training program is an HHF initiative with the aim to train and teach youth digital media skills.

==== International Service Skate Trips ====
The Harold Hunter Foundation takes international service skate trips, bringing underprivileged American youth around the world to skate and do skate activism.

== Merchandise collaborations ==
The Harold Hunter Foundation has collaborated with a variety of brands including HUF, Adidas, Zoo York, Nike, and others to make merchandise commemorating Harold Hunter with proceeds going to the foundation.

== External sites ==
- Official Site
