= Zoo York =

Zoo York may refer to:

- Zoo York (Central Park), style and social philosophy inspired by 1970s New York City graffiti art subculture
- Zoo York (company), American company focused on the skateboarding market
- "Zoo York" (song), by Lil Tjay featuring Fivio Foreign and Pop Smoke
- "Zoo York", a song by Oakenfold from the 2002 album Bunkka

== See also ==
- Zoo York Wall, former graffiti wall inspired by the graffiti subculture
