= Zered Bassett =

American skateboarder (born 1984)

Personal information
- Born: February 6, 1984 (age 41); Hyannis, Massachusetts, United States

Sport
- Country: United States
- Sport: Skateboarding

Zered Bassett (born February 6, 1984) is a regular-footed professional skateboarder, living and working in New York City.

== Early life ==
Born in Hyannis, Massachusetts, Bassett grew up in Chatham, Massachusetts.

== Skateboarding career ==
Zered Bassett's first sponsor was Sixteen Skateboards.

In 2003, Bassett appeared in the Zoo York Skateboard Company video City of Killers. In 2005, Bassett appeared in the DVS Shoes video "Skate More" and his co-directed film "Vicious Cycle" with RB Umali. Also in 2005, Bassett had the closing part of the Digital Skateboarding video titled Divercity, skating to the Timbaland & Jay-Z song, Lobster & Shrimp.

In 2005, Bassett won Rookie of the year at The 7th Annual TransWorld SKATEboarding Awards.

In 2007, Bassett starred in the RB Umali produced show: Firsthand On Fuel TV.

In 2008, Bassett received his first pro shoe from DVS Shoes.

In 2009, Bassett appeared in the Zoo York State of Mind video with a 6+ minute part, skating to two songs: Dio by Holy Diver and M.O.P. - Cold As Ice.

In 2012, Bassett left Zoo York as corporate restructuring led the company to cut all riders not currently on long term contracts. Only Brandon Westgate and Chaz Ortiz remained. Westgate would leave the company in 2015 and Ortiz in 2018. In October 2012, Bassett signed with Expedition skateboards.

In 2014, Bassett had a part in the Transworld Outliers video. Also in 2014, Bassett had a part in the Supreme video - cherry - directed by Bill Strobeck.

In 2016, Bassett left Expedition.

In 2017, Bassett signed with Alltimers skateboards.

In 2018, Bassett had a part in both the Alltimers video No Idea and the Converse video Purple.

As of 2023, Basset continues to put out video parts, including Alltimers' 2021 ET&DUSTIN and You Deserve It in 2022. He has also been featured in Dave Caddo's 2022 video Pattern Language and CONS/Krooked's Middle Earth, both of which were released in 2022.

== Sponsors ==
Converse, Alltimers, Tensor Trucks, Mob Grip, Hardluck, Spitfire

== Filmography ==
- Zoo York: EST Premier Issue (2000)
- Zoo York: EST Version 2.0 (2001)
- White Knuckle Extreme: Black Out (2002)
- Zoo York: Unbreakable: Mix Tape 2 (2002)
- Zoo York: City of Killers (2003)
- Vinny Raffa Has A Posse (2004)
- Red Bull: Seek & Destroy I (2004)
- Static II: The Invisibles (2004)
- Digital: Divercity (2005)
- DVS: Skate More (2005)
- Vicious Cycle (2005)
- Zoo York: Ellis Island (2005)
- Zoo York: Welcome To Zoo York City (2006)
- Krooked: Kronichles (2006)
- Streets: NYC (2006)
- Thrasher: King Of The Road (2007)
- Chapman: Short Ends (2007)
- DVS: City Of Dogs (2007)
- DVS: East Infection Tour (2007)
- Firsthand: Zered Bassett (2007)
- DVS: Dudes Dudes Dudes (2008)
- Transworld: Skate & Create (2008)
- Zoo York: State of Mind (2009)
- Converse: Burnt Ice and Bum Glaze (2013)
- Red Bull: Perspective (2013)
- Supreme: "cherry" (2014)
- Orchard: Stone Soup (2014)
- Transworld: Outliers (2014)
- Expedition One: Gone Fishin' (2014)
- Converse: One Star World Tour (2016)
- Converse: Purple (2018)
- Alltimers: No Idea (2018)
- Dime: Knowing Mixtape Vol. 2 (2019)
- Converse: Seize the Seconds (2020)
- Alltimers: ET & DUSTIN (2021)
- Alltimers: You Deserve It (2022)
- CONS / Krooked: Middle Earth (2022)
- Dave Caddo: Pattern Language (2022)
- Thrasher Vacation: Canada (2023)
- Thrasher Weekend: Cons in Kansas City (2024)
