= R.B. Umali =

American filmmaker

- Education: New York University
- Occupations: Filmmaker; photographer; skate videographer

R.B. Umali is an American filmmaker, skate videographer, and photographer based out of New York City.

== Filmmaking ==
From the mid 1990s to the mid 2000s, Umali documented some of the finest New York City skateboarding while working for Zoo York, filming skaters such as Harold Hunter, Zered Bassett, and others. Umali filmed NYC skateboarding during and after attending film school at NYU.

In 2003, Umali premiered a documentary video R.B.'s Eastern Journey at the 2003 New York Underground Film Festival. In 2004, Umali released Vicious Cycle. In 2005, Umali released NY Revisited Vol 1 (96–97).
