= Danny Supa =

American skateboarder (born 1978)

Daniel Supasiriratana, known as Danny Supa (born October 13, 1978) is a goofy-footed American professional skateboarder.

== Skateboarding career ==
In the 1998, Transworld Skateboarding video Feedback, Supa wore an all white track suit. In 2002, Nike SB released a New York Knicks colorway SB Dunk by Supa. In 2017, Nike released a hightop dunk of Supa's original Knicks color way.

=== Skate Video parts ===
- 1995: A Love Supreme – Supreme
- 1997: Issue 23 - 411VM
- 1998: Mix Tape – Zoo York
- 1999: Peep This – Zoo York
- 2002: Unbreakable Mix Tape 2 – Zoo York
- 2002: E.S.T 3.0 – Zoo York
- 2003: City of Killers – Zoo York
- 2003: Issue 59 - 411VM
- 2004: On Tap - Nike SB
- 2004: Seek & Destroy – Red Bull
- 2004: Vinny Raffa Has A Posse
- 2005: R.B. Umali NY Revisited Vol 1 (96–97)
- 2005: Vicious Cycle - R.B. Umali
- 2006: Streets: NYC
- 2007: A Journey Through Sound - Stereo
- 2007: Nothing But The Truth - Nike SB
- 2008: The Coast
- 2008: Agency Field Report - Stereo
- 2009: Full Frequency - Hi Fi
- 2010: Don't Fear The Sweeper - Nike SB
- 2011: Stay in Front - BLVD
- 2014: The Brodies
- 2016: Quinto - BLVD

== Personal life ==
Supa was born in Thailand and has family that lives there.
