= Soul Artists of Zoo York =

New York graffiti and skate crew

Soul Artists
- Soul Artists of Zoo York
- Nickname: SA
- Founder: Ali
- Founded at: Van Cortlandt Park, The Bronx
- Type: Graffiti and skateboard crew

The Soul Artists of Zoo York were one of New York City's first skate crews.

== History ==
The Soul Artists of Zoo York were a loose-knit collective of skateboarders and graffiti artists.

The Soul Artists of Zoo York skated an abandoned bowl in Van Cortlandt Park called the "Deathbowl", which was the origin of the name for a documentary on the NY skate scene: Deathbowl to Downtown, narrated by Chloe Sevigny, released in 2008. The name was coined by Marc 'Ali' Edmonds, the president of the original Zoo York graffiti crew. Members included Andy Kessler, Rodney Smith, Edmonds, Futura, and Jamie Affoumado.

The clothing company Zoo York, with the blessing of the original Zoo York crew, took the name from the Soul Artists of Zoo York crew.
