= Central Park Zoo =

Zoo in Manhattan, New York

- Central Park Zoo logo

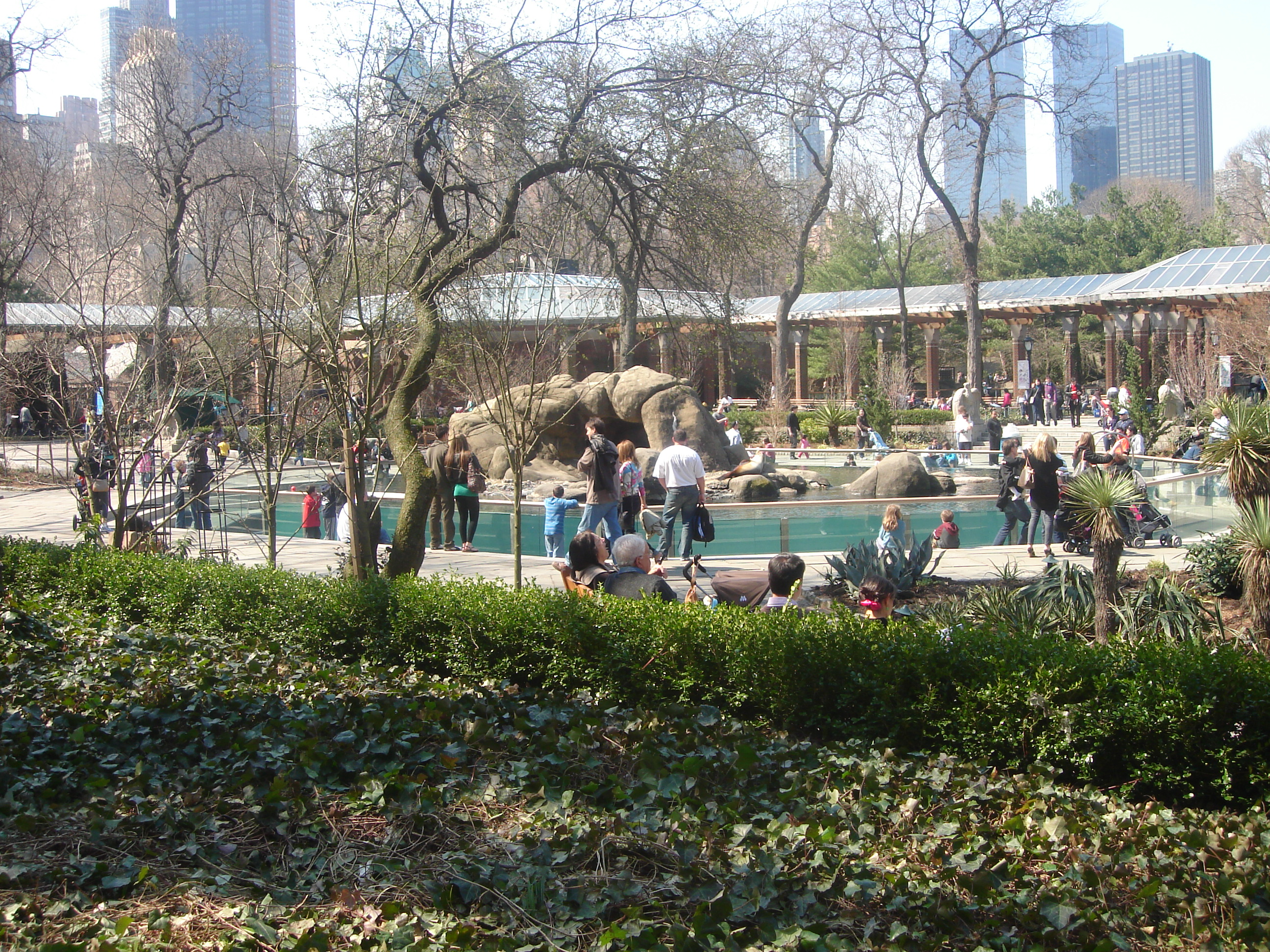
- Central area of the Central Park Zoo
- Interactive map of Central Park Zoo
- 40°46′4″N 73°58′18″W
- Date opened: 1864; 162 years ago (menagerie); December 2, 1934; 91 years ago (zoo); August 8, 1988; 38 years ago (renovated)
- Location: Central Park, New York City, United States
- Land area: 6.5 acres (2.6 ha)
- Memberships: AZA
- Owner: Wildlife Conservation Society
- Public transit: New York City Subway: trains at Fifth Avenue–59th Street trains at 68th Street–Hunter College; New York City Bus: M1, M2, M3, M4, M5, M66, M72, Q32
- Website: centralparkzoo.com

The Central Park Zoo is a 6.5-acre (2.6 ha) zoo located at the southeast corner of Central Park in New York City. It is part of an integrated system of four zoos and one aquarium managed by the Wildlife Conservation Society (WCS). In conjunction with the Central Park Zoo's operations, the WCS offers children's educational programs, is engaged in restoration of endangered species populations, and reaches out to the local community through volunteer programs.

Its precursor, a menagerie, was founded in 1864, becoming the first public zoo to open in New York. The present facility first opened as a city zoo on December 2, 1934, and was part of a larger revitalization program of city parks, playgrounds and zoos initiated in 1934 by New York City Department of Parks and Recreation (NYC Parks) commissioner Robert Moses. It was built, in large part, through Civil Works Administration and Works Progress Administration (WPA) labor and funding. The Children's Zoo opened to the north of the main zoo in 1960, using funding from a donation by Senator Herbert Lehman and his wife Edith.

In 1983, after 49 years of operation by NYC Parks, Central Park Zoo closed for reconstruction. The closure was part of a five-year, $35 million renovation program, that completely replaced the zoo's cages with naturalistic environments. It was rededicated in August 1988, as part of a system of five facilities managed by the WCS, all of which are accredited by the Association of Zoos and Aquariums (AZA). (Note: The others are the Bronx Zoo, Prospect Park Zoo, Queens Zoo, and New York Aquarium.)

== Description ==
Notable buildings and structures of Central Park. Click on the map and then on the points for details.

The Central Park Zoo is part of the Wildlife Conservation Society (WCS), an integrated network of four zoos and an aquarium spread throughout New York City. Located at East 64th Street and Fifth Avenue, the zoo is situated on a 6.5-acre (2.6 ha) plot in Central Park. Visitors may enter through the Fifth Avenue entrance or from within Central Park.

The Central Park Zoo is a major tourist attraction within Central Park, drawing more than one million people every year. According to a 2011 study by the Central Park Conservancy, the zoo and its surroundings were visited by an estimated four million people each year. However, the WCS cites much lower figures since it only counts patrons with tickets. In 2007, it recorded that 1.01 million people visited the Central Park Zoo, and in 2006, 1.03 million people. As of the Wildlife Conservation Society's 2016 census of its zoos, the Central Park Zoo had 1,487 animals representing 163 species.

=== Main zoo ===
Trellised, vine-clad, glass-roofed pergolas link the three major exhibit areas—tropic, temperate and polar—housed in discrete buildings of brick trimmed with granite, masked by vines. The exhibit areas are centered around a square central garden that contains a square sea lion pool in its center. The sea lion pool is surrounded by glass fencing to allow visitors to observe the sea lions and their daily feedings.

==== Exhibits and other buildings ====
The structure at the central garden's southwestern corner is the "Tropic Zone", which contains a two-story representation of a tropical rainforest. There is also a large free-flight area for birds. The rainforest houses Rodrigues flying foxes, Seba's short-tailed bats, emerald tree boas, pythons, cotton-top tamarins, white-eared titis, toucans, black-and-white ruffed lemurs from the Bronx Zoo. There is also a large variety of birds, (Note: These include scarlet ibises, emerald starlings, superb starlings, pied avocets, speckled mousebirds, sunbitterns, Venezuelan troupials, Taveta golden weavers, blue-capped motmots, crested couas, blue-gray tanagers, African pygmy geese, ochre-marked parakeets, white-fronted amazons, blue-headed macaws, plum-headed parakeets, Lord Derby's parakeets, Fischer's lovebirds, golden conures, red birds-of-paradise, superb birds-of-paradise, Nicobar pigeons, black-naped fruit doves, green peafowl, Victoria crowned pigeons, coroneted fruit doves, kagus, blue-and-yellow macaws and red-and-green macaws.) and the zoo also keeps red-bellied piranhas, pig-nosed turtles, and red-footed tortoises. The elephant house of the original menagerie was formerly located at the site.

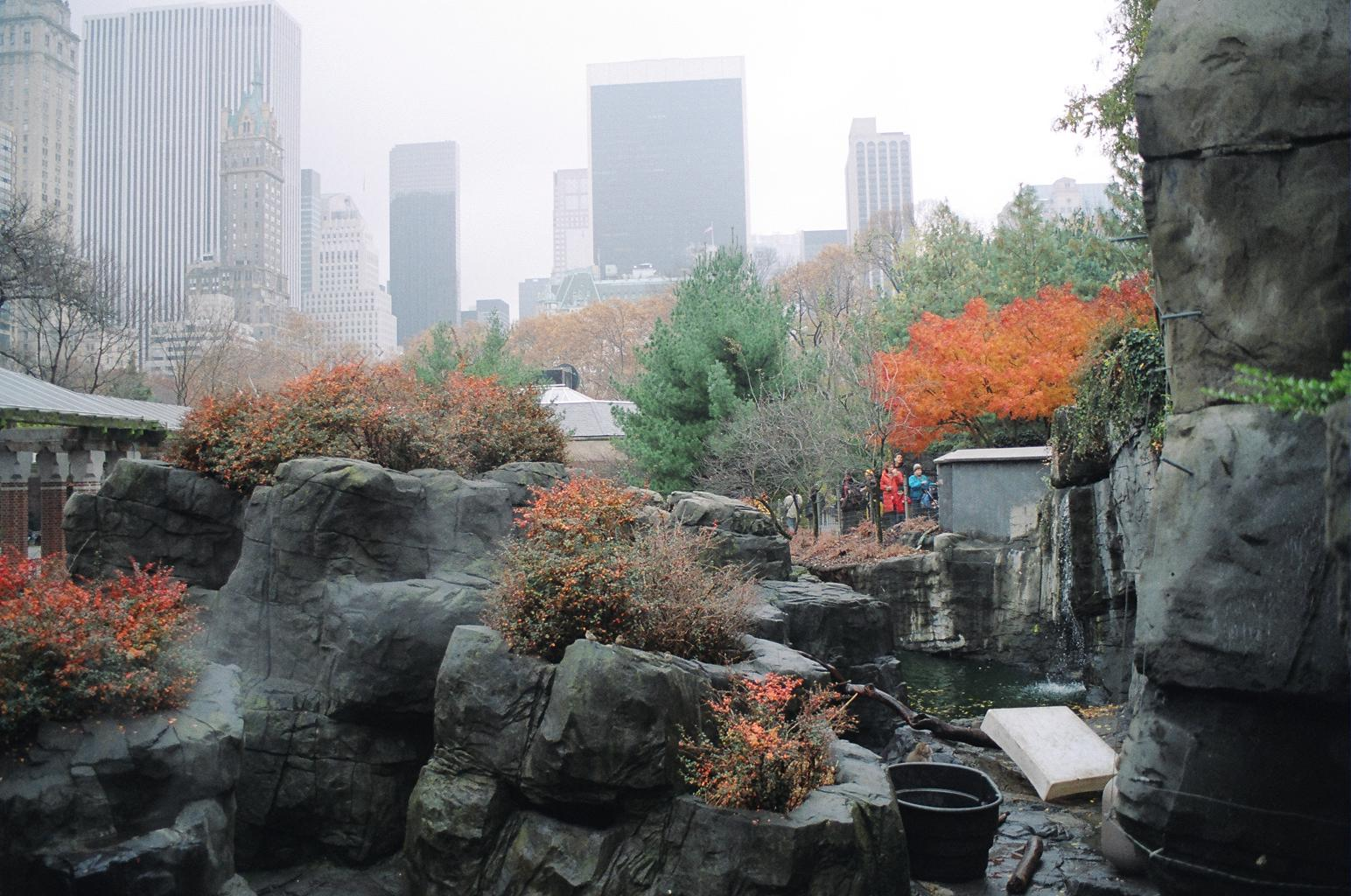
The Temperate Zone, one of the three major exhibit areas at Central Park Zoo

To the west of the garden is the "Temperate Territory", a landscaped series of paths surrounding a lake. It houses animals such as red pandas, white-naped cranes, Japanese macaques, and snow leopards. A snow leopard exhibit in the Temperate Territory opened in June 2009. The Temperate Territory is located on the site of the 1934 zoo's cafeteria.

The northern side of the garden is adjacent to the "Penguins and Sea Birds" section. This multilevel structure contains a chilled penguin house that houses macaroni penguins, king penguins, chinstrap penguins, gentoo penguins, Atlantic puffins, tufted puffins and an outdoor pool with harbor seals, as well as an outdoor grizzly bear exhibit. It is located on the site of a lion house that was built in 1934 along with the original menagerie.

The eastern side of the central garden is next to the Arsenal, technically located outside the zoo. The structure was completed in 1851 and originally intended as a weapons and ammunition storehouse for the New York State Militia. It once served as an actual zoo building, but now contains NYC Parks Department offices. Central Park Zoo includes a 4D theater, located to the north of the Arsenal. A souvenir shop and ticket booth are located to the south of the Arsenal.

The southern side of the garden contains the Intelligence Garden, located at the site of the original menagerie's horned animal/small mammal house. Its name is inspired by a rare-animal menagerie created by King Wen of Zhou in 1100 B.C. A cafeteria, the Dancing Crane Cafe, is located to the south of the Intelligence Garden.

==== Art and conservation programs ====
Several works of public art can be found in the Central Park Zoo. Five structures, preserved from the original zoo built in 1934, (Note: The structures that still exist, or have been modified from the original zoo, are: Birdhouse; Smaller-Hoofed Animal House; Larger-Hoofed Animal House; Garage, animal kitchen, and annexes; Monkey House) still feature their original animal-themed limestone friezes sculpted by Frederick Roth. The same artist created a pair of bronze statues for the original zoo, Dancing Goat and Dancing Bear, which now flank the zoo's southern entrance. Tigress and Cubs, one of the park's oldest statues, was created by Auguste Cain in 1867 and installed on a rock outcrop near the Lake, but moved to the zoo in 1934.

The zoo coordinates breeding programs for some endangered species as part of the Species Survival Plan, such as thick-billed parrots and red pandas. In 2011, the Central Park Zoo was the first North American zoo to hatch ducklings of critically endangered scaly-sided mergansers. The first example of whispering in non-human primates was observed at the Central Park Zoo in 2013, when tamarin monkeys were heard whispering around a staff member that they disliked.

The zoo hosts educational venues as well as exhibits. The volunteer program at the Central Park Zoo engages members of the community; it is a combination outreach and educational program for adults. Volunteer guides conduct tours for visitors, while volunteer docents augment the educational program. Docents enroll in a four-month training program. The zoo also offers several programs for students.

=== Children's Zoo ===
The Children's Zoo is located north of the main zoo. It is officially named the Tisch Children's Zoo after businessman Laurence A. Tisch, whose donation funded the zoo's 1990s renovation. The Children's Zoo contains a petting zoo with mini nubian goats (a crossbreed between Nigerian dwarf and Nubian goats), sheep, pigs, alpacas, Patagonian cavies, and the only cow in Manhattan, as well as the Acorn Theatre, a performing arts theater. Admission to the Children's Zoo is included with the purchase of tickets to the main zoo.

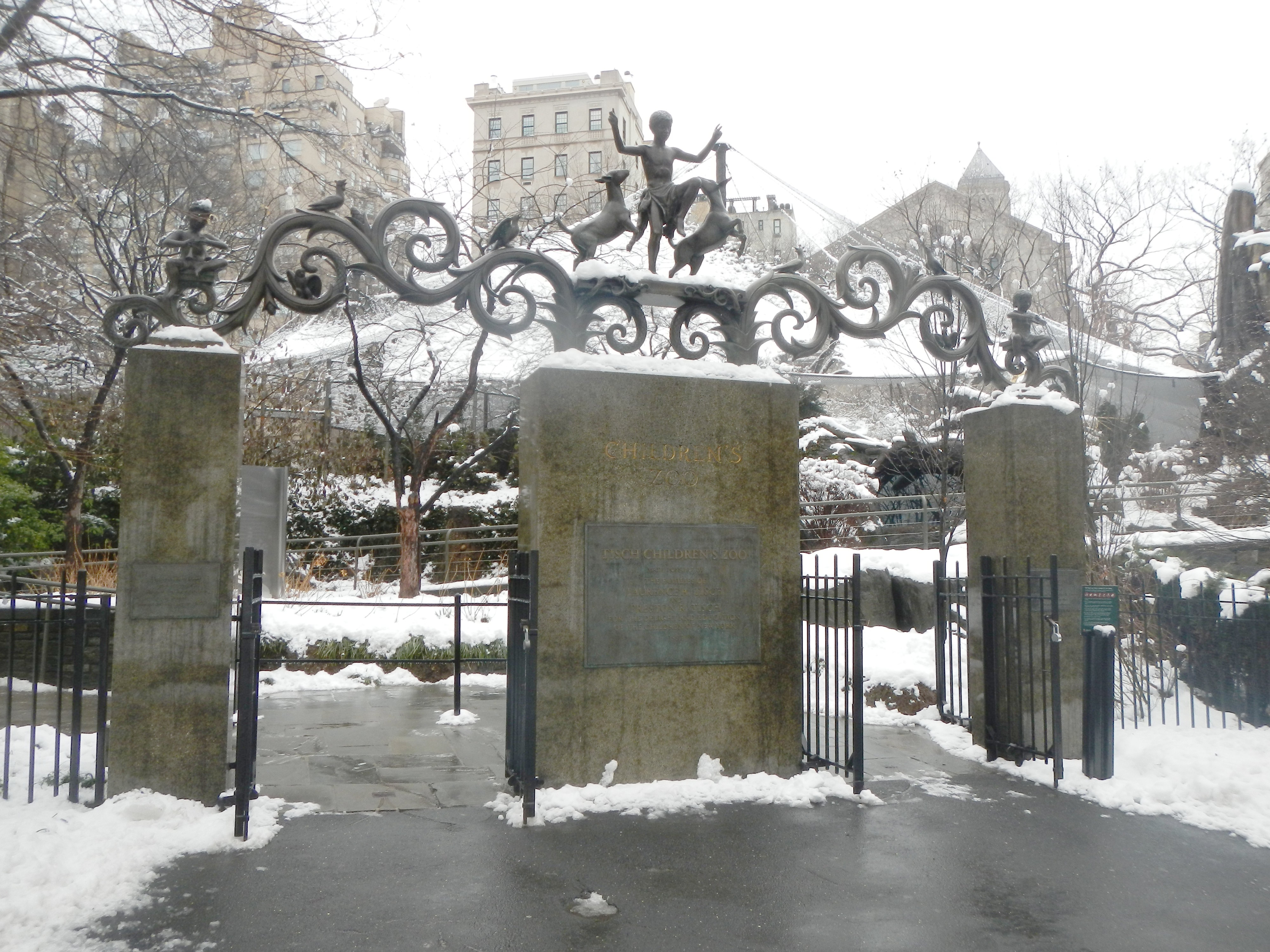
The Lehman Gates

The Lehman Gates by Paul Manship are a notable feature retained from the original Children's Zoo. They were donated by Herbert and Edith Lehman in 1960 in honor of their 50th anniversary, and as part of their donation toward the construction of the Children's Zoo itself. The gates were renovated in the 1980s. Additionally, the Delacorte Clock, a gift of George T. Delacorte dedicated in 1965, is mounted on a three-tiered tower above the arcade between the Wildlife Center and the Children's Zoo.

== History ==
=== Original menagerie ===
==== Planning and creation ====
The zoo was not part of the original Greensward Plan for Central Park created by Frederick Law Olmsted and Calvert Vaux. However, a menagerie near the Arsenal, on the edge of Central Park located at Fifth Avenue facing East 64th Street, spontaneously evolved from gifts of exotic pets and other animals informally given to the park. The first animal, a bear cub tied to a tree, was left in Central Park in 1859, followed by a monkey the next year. These animals were popular with the park's visitors even though there was no formal zoo at the time. Soon, people began donating other animals such as cranes, a peacock, and goldfish. Unsolicited donations came from a variety of people, from prominent figures to young boys. The donations also included dead animals.The Central Park planning commission recorded all of these donations in its annual reports.

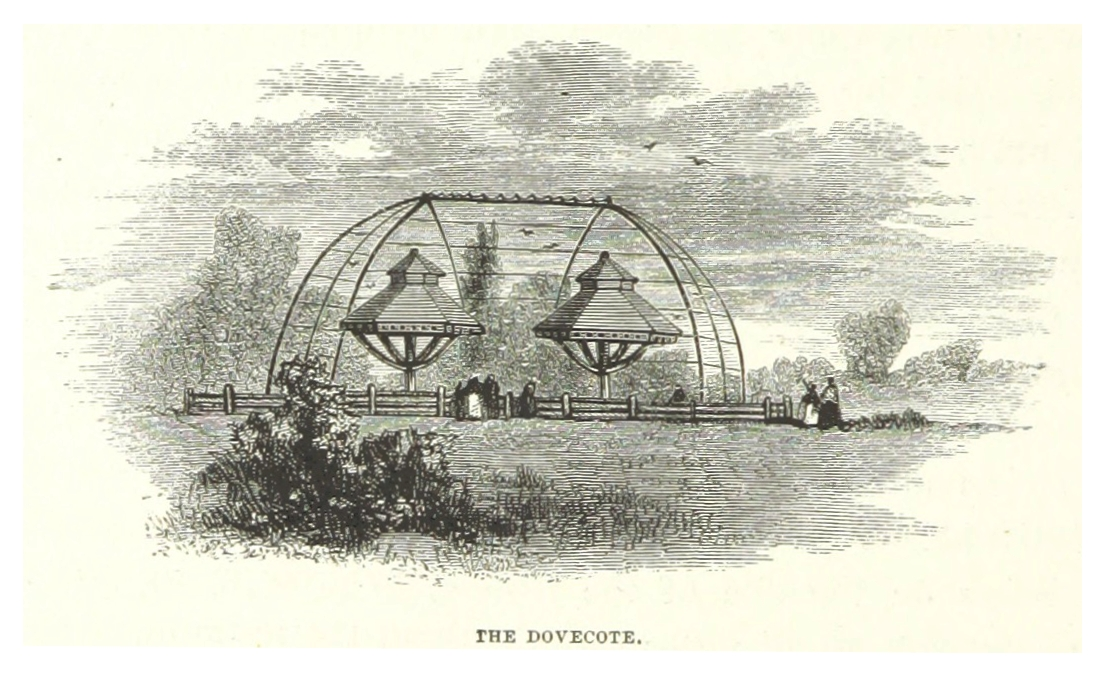
1869, The Dovecote

The American Zoological and Botanical Society, which sought to create a zoo somewhere in New York City, was created in early 1860. The group began discussing possible sites for a zoo, among them Central Park. By 1862, 60 acres (24 ha) had been set aside for the construction of a future "zoological and botanical garden", later the Central Park Zoo. meanwhile, the animals were kept in the Central Park Mall. Popular animals included three bald eagles and a bald-headed monkey.

In 1864, the zoo formally received charter confirmation from New York's assembly, making it the United States' second publicly owned zoo, after the Philadelphia Zoo, which was founded in 1859. By then, the park had over 400 animals; more than 250 additional animals were donated in 1864–1865 alone. Originally the zoo was supposed to be located in Manhattan Square, on the west side of Central Park where the American Museum of Natural History is now located, though this location was never used as a zoo. Up to twelve sites were eventually considered for the zoo throughout the last three decades of the 19th century, including the North Meadow of Central Park. Some animals were moved to the Arsenal in 1865, and larger animals grazed there during summers. In 1868, a "deer park" was established at the current site of the Metropolitan Museum of Art.

In 1870, when the Tammany Hall political organization took control of the Central Park commission, it mandated that the Central Park menagerie buy its own animals rather than accept donations, and it moved the animals to five structures behind the Arsenal. The same year, Benjamin Waterhouse Hawkins sculpted dinosaur figures for the Paleozoic Museum, a proposed dinosaur museum near the zoo, but they were destroyed in a fit of vandalism that the Geologists' Association described as "perplexing".

==== Popularity and decline ====
The menagerie became popular because of its free admission and proximity to working-class Lower Manhattan; by 1873, it saw 2.5 million annual visitors. The first permanent menagerie building was constructed behind the Arsenal in 1875. The menagerie reached peak popularity in the mid-1880s after a chimpanzee nicknamed "Mike Crowley" was imported from Liberia. Observers such as former president Ulysses S. Grant showed up at the Monkey House to see the chimpanzee, overfilling the building past capacity. However, Irish-American groups took offense to the chimpanzee's nickname, saying that the names given to animals in the Central Park menagerie were stereotypically Irish, and thus derogatory to that ethnic group. Frederick Law Olmsted also disapproved of the menagerie, believing Central Park to be better suited for scenic vistas than for entertainment, though he admitted that the zoo was the most popular part of the park.

By the 1890s, wealthy residents of nearby neighborhoods were clamoring for the zoo to be relocated somewhere else, such as the North Meadow. However, these efforts met resistance, as the Central Park menagerie was popular among the general public and among the politicians that represented them. This subsequently led to the creation of the Bronx Zoo, a much larger, privately operated zoo in the Bronx in 1897. Though wealthy residents hoped that people would travel to the Bronx Zoo for its superior facilities, the Central Park Zoo continued to be popular even after the Bronx Zoo opened in 1899. The Central Park menagerie attracted over three million people annually by 1902, more than the Museum of Natural History and the Metropolitan Museum combined, despite only receiving one-fifth as much money as either of the museums.

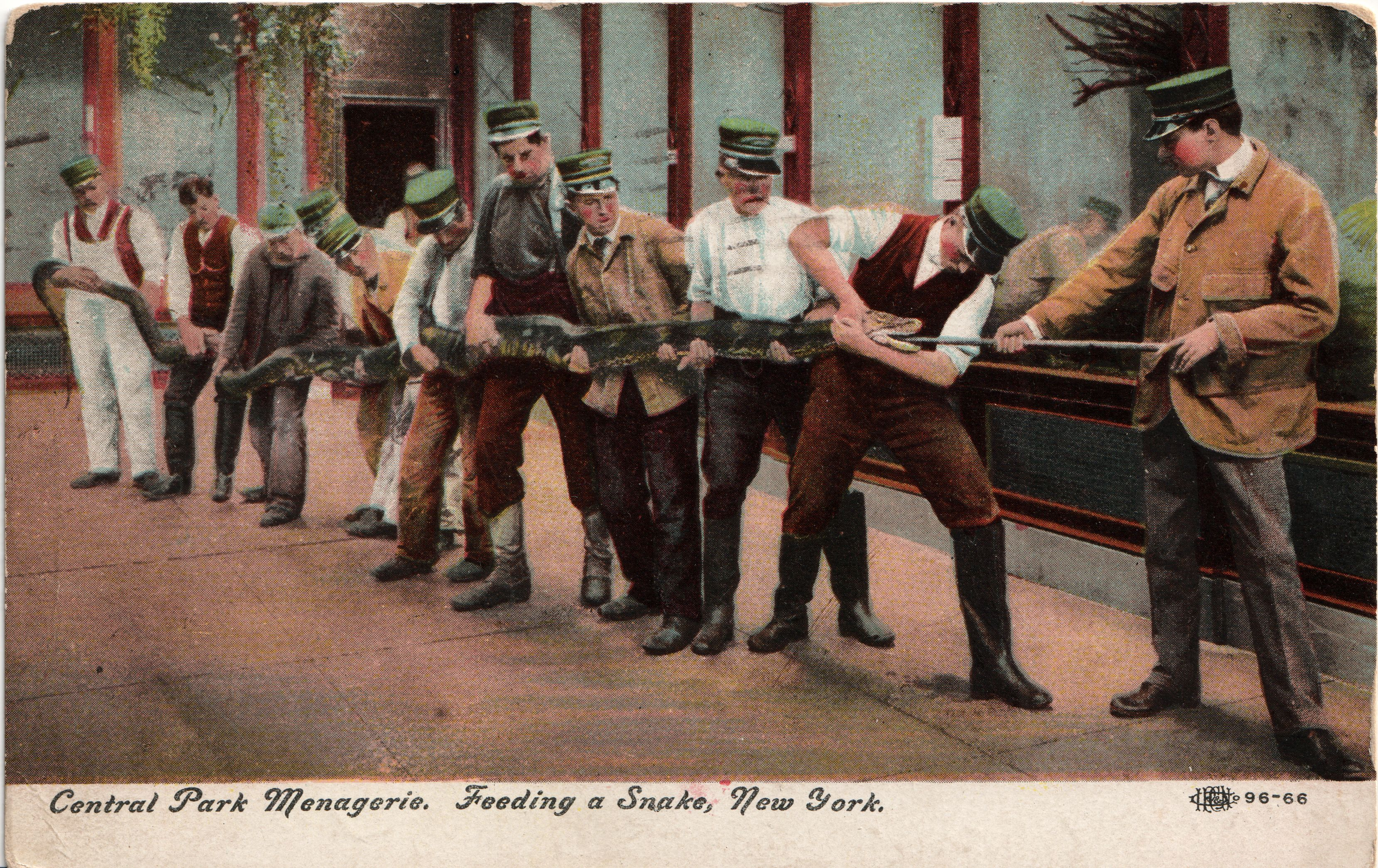
Zoo staff feeding a snake, about 1910

Through the early 20th century, the quality of the menagerie declined through neglect from the city government, which administered the zoo. The zoo accepted creatures of all kinds, even those with health problems, but offered insufficient veterinary care. In 1919, some of the structures at the Central Park menagerie were modified to accommodate the addition of new animals. In 1932, a new concrete structure was built for the zoo's wolves because the previous steel enclosure was deemed insufficient to contain the wolves. By then, the zoo was extremely rundown, and its 22 cages were regarded as "flimsy and rat-ridden".The wooden sheds posed a fire hazard, and the enclosures were so ineffective that zookeepers guarded the lion house to prevent the lions from escaping.

=== Current zoo ===
==== Construction of new zoo ====
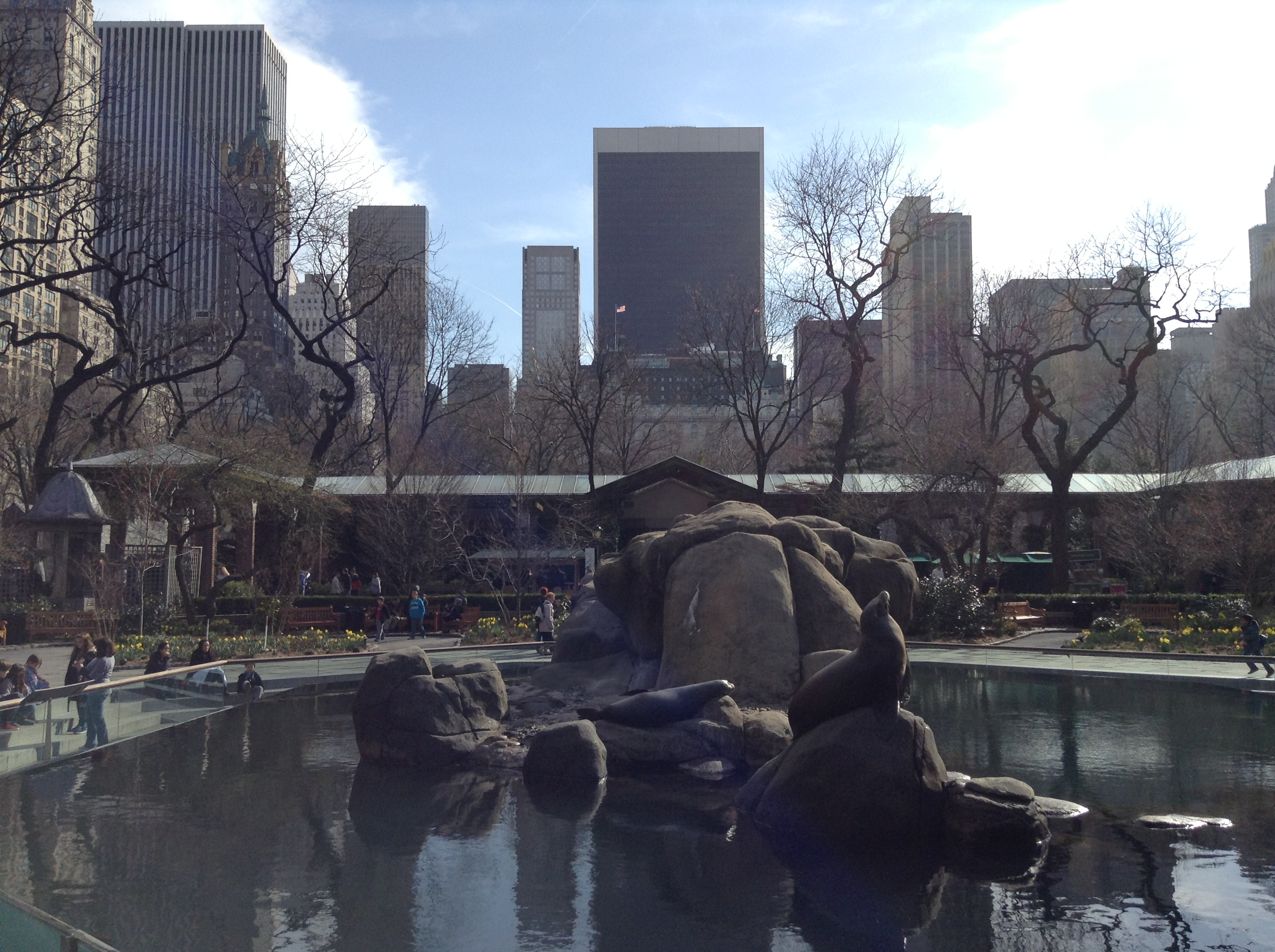
The sea lion pool, as seen looking south toward Midtown Manhattan

After assuming office in January 1934, New York City mayor Fiorello La Guardia hired Robert Moses to head a newly unified Parks Department. Moses soon prepared extensive plans to reconstruct the city's parks, renovate existing facilities and create new swimming pools, zoos, playgrounds and parks. Moses acquired substantial Civil Works Administration, and later, Works Progress Administration funding and soon embarked upon an eight-year citywide construction program, relieving some of the high unemployment in New York City in this Depression year.

Plans for the new Central Park Zoo were prepared by Aymar Embury II within a 16-day span in February 1934 and were announced the following month. Embury's plans called for nine terracotta and brick structures to replace the structures in the menagerie. These structures included seven new animal enclosures, as well as a comfort station and a garage. (Note: The structures, clockwise from south, were: Birdhouse; Smaller-Hoofed Animal House; Larger-Hoofed Animal House; Horned Animal/Small Mammal House; Garage, animal kitchen, and annexes; Elephant House; Cafeteria; Lion House; Monkey House) A sea lion pool, designed by Charles Schmieder, was to be located in the center of the new zoo, surrounded by the zoo enclosures on three sides. The new structures were designed in such a way that they could be maintained easily. The buildings, to cost $411,000, were designed in conjunction with new enclosures at the Prospect Park Zoo.

The reconstruction of the zoo was initially criticized by individuals who thought that the money spent on building a zoo would be better utilized on the construction of new schools around the city. During the reconstruction, the previous structures were entirely demolished. While construction was ongoing, animals were temporarily moved to other zoos. The rebuilt zoo opened on December 2, 1934, at a ceremony where former governor Al Smith was given the honorary title of "night superintendent". By April 1936, the renovated zoo had seen six million visitors since its reopening. To prevent the recurrence of rat infestations, Moses also instituted a rat-elimination program in and around the zoo.

==== 1960s and 1970s ====
In June 1960, U.S. Senator Herbert Lehman and his wife Edith donated $500,000 toward the construction of a new children's zoo just north of the existing zoo. Work began that November, and the children's zoo was officially opened on June 27, 1961. The children's zoo featured attractions like a petting area with ducks, rabbits, and chickens; a large fiberglass whale statue dubbed "Whaley" (which acted as the entrance to the small zoo); a Noah's Ark feature; and a medieval castle feature. The animals were housed in small storybook-style structures bordering an irregular pond. By 1967, the wooden railings around the main zoo's enclosures were rotting, and NYC Parks commissioner August Heckscher II had authorized repairs to these railings. The same year, the zoo cafeteria was renovated after a new concessionaire took control of the cafe.

In the late 1960s and early 1970s, the New York City Subway's 63rd Street lines, the present-day M and Q trains, were being built directly underneath the zoo. A graffiti wall was erected along the line's length through Central Park. The tunnel provided a subterranean gathering place for very early subway artists who hung around together in Central Park, and was named Zoo York by ALI, founder of the SOUL ARTISTS graffiti crew. The name came about because it was in a zoo in New York, hence "Zoo York". The construction of the subway line itself was controversial because it called for 1,500 feet (460 m) of cut-and-cover tunneling, which required digging an open trench through Central Park and then covering it over. One of the concerns was that the Central Park Zoo, and a bird sanctuary outside the zoo, were located very close to the boundary of the trench. Eventually, the New York City Transit Authority, which operated the New York City Subway, agreed to reduce disruption by halving the length of the cut.

A nature kiosk at Central Park Zoo was added in 1972, and a $500,000 renovation for the Lion House was proposed the following year. By then, the Central Park Zoo was quite dilapidated: in November 1974, protesters gathered outside the zoo to protest the conditions there. NYC Parks commissioner Gordon Davis described the zoo as a "Rikers Island for animals". Even so, the zoo was one of the most popular attractions in Central Park through the 1980s, according to surveys taken during that era.

Around the same time, there was a plan to shift control of the Central Park, Prospect Park, and Queens Zoos from the city government to the New York Zoological Society, a quasi-public conservation organization. At the time, none of the zoos had dedicated curatorial staff and all had only a skeletal zookeeping staff. The society proposed sending the larger animals to different zoos with more humane conditions, and animal-rights groups sued the city in an effort to close the two zoos and move the animals to the larger Bronx Zoo. A 1976 report by the World Federation for the Protection of Animals found that all three zoos were operating in "shameful conditions", and that the animals at the Central Park and Prospect Park Zoos were living in poorly maintained facilities.

==== 1980s renovation ====
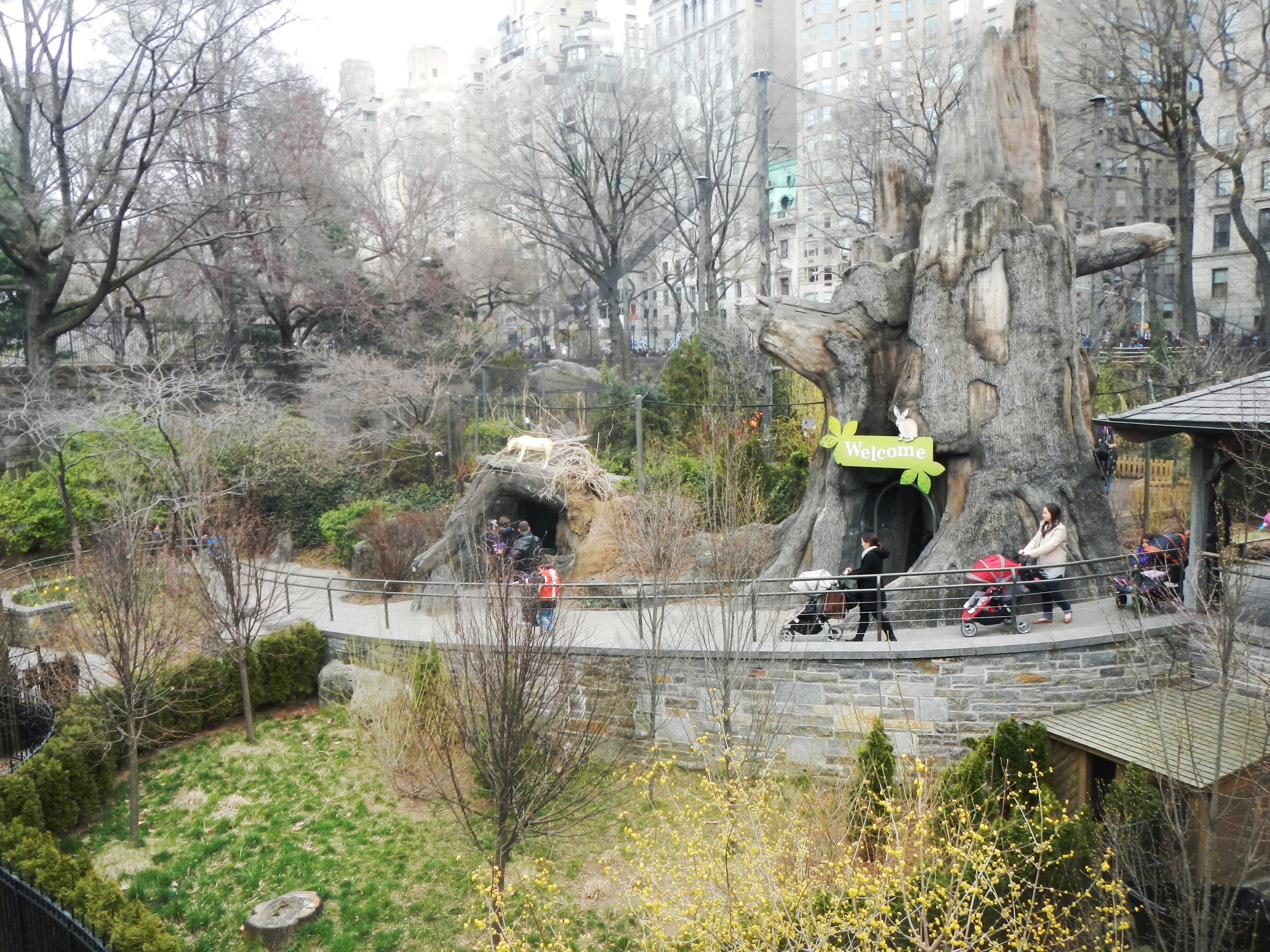
The Children's Zoo

The administration of mayor Ed Koch and the New York Zoological Society (renamed the Wildlife Conservation Society, or WCS, in 1993) signed a fifty-year agreement in April 1980, wherein the Central Park, Prospect Park, and Queens Zoos would be administered by the Society. They proposed renovation plans for all three zoos in 1981. The Central Park Zoo's renovation plan called for the demolition of five of the six structures around the sea lion pool (except for the Arsenal), as well as new classrooms and auditoriums for students, and a snack bar to replace the zoo's concessions.

The New York Times reported that "the caging of these animals in inadequate spaces has long enraged animal lovers." Starting in November 1982, the Central Park Zoo's animals were temporarily moved to other zoos while construction was ongoing. Most of the large animals were permanently rehoused in larger, more natural spaces at the Bronx Zoo. The zoo had three "problem animals" that few other zoos wanted to take, but even they found homes.

The main zoo was closed in late 1983, though the children's zoo remained open. Demolition continued through 1984, though construction on the new zoo did not begin until the following year. The subsequent redesign was executed by Kevin Roche of Kevin Roche John Dinkeloo Associates. The facility's menagerie cages were replaced with three naturalistic habitats that blended with Central Park's scenery. Four of the original buildings were preserved in the redesigned zoo, though the cramped outdoor cages were demolished. The central feature of the original zoo, the sea lion pool, was retained.

The renovation was originally budgeted at $8.3 million. The renovated zoo was then planned to reopen in 1985 at a cost of $14 million, but the project was delayed for three years. The zoo reopened to the public on August 8, 1988. The renovation ended up costing $35 million. Of this, the city contributed $22 million while the Society contributed the balance. In order to pay for the zoo construction, the Society started charging admission for zoo patrons for the first time in the zoo's history. With the reopening of the Central Park Zoo, the Society aimed to designate each of its three small zoos with a specific purpose. The Central Park Zoo would be focused toward conservation; the Prospect Park Zoo would be primarily a children's zoo; and the Queens Zoo would become a zoo with North American animals.

==== 1990s to present ====
By the early 1990s, some of the structures at the Children's Zoo had collapsed, and there were reports that the animals were being neglected. Under threat of closure by federal regulators, the city closed the zoo in 1991. Though the WCS had a plan to renovate the zoo, it languished for years because the restoration needed approval from the New York City Landmarks Preservation Commission (LPC), which had designated several zoo buildings as landmarks. There were disputes over what the theme of the renovated Children's Zoo should be.

In 1996, the $6 million plan to renovate the Children's Zoo was approved by the LPC, though it was opposed by preservationists who wanted to prevent the zoo's structures from demolition. The renovation was initially supposed to be funded by $3 million from Henry and Edith Everett, but the Everetts withdrew their gift due to disputes over how the money should be spent. With the help of a $4.5 million grant from businessman Laurence A. Tisch, the Children's Zoo was renovated and renamed the Tisch Children's Zoo upon its reopening in September 1997.

In June 2009, the Allison Maher Stern Snow Leopard Exhibit opened with three snow leopards, moved from the Bronx Zoo. The exhibit, costing $10.6 million, was the first new feature in the zoo since its 1988 renovation. In March 2020, the Central Park Zoo and the WCS's other facilities were shuttered indefinitely due to the COVID-19 pandemic in New York City. The zoo reopened that July.

== Hoax ==
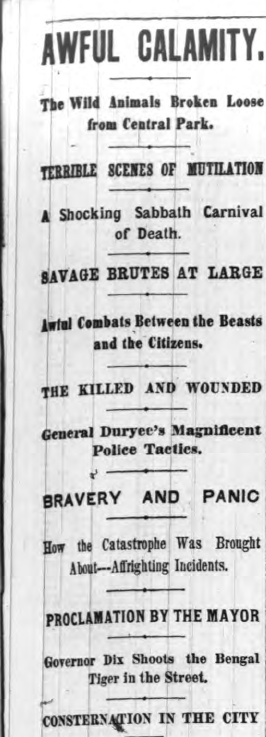
The headline for the 1874 New York Herald story

A famous hoax regarding the zoo is known as the Central Park Zoo escape and the Central Park menagerie scare of 1874. It was a hoax perpetrated by James Gordon Bennett Jr. in his newspaper, the New York Herald. J. I. C. Clarke was the primary writer of the hoax, under the direction and inspiration of the Herald's managing editor, T. B. Connery, who often walked through the zoo, and had witnessed the near-escape of a leopard. The Herald's cover story of November 9, 1874, claimed that there had been a mass escape of animals from the Central Park Zoo and that several people had been killed by the free-roaming beasts. A rhinoceros was said to be the first escapee, goring his keeper to death and setting into motion the escape of other animals, including a polar bear, a panther, a Numidian lion, several hyenas, and a Bengal tiger.

At the end of the lengthy article, which was divided across several pages of the newspaper, the following notice was the only indication that the story horrifying readers across the city was a hoax: "... of course, the entire story given above is a pure fabrication. Not one word of it is true." That was not enough to assuage critics, however, who accused Bennett of inciting panic when the extent of the hoax became widely known. The authors later claimed their intent was merely to draw attention to inadequate safety precautions at the zoo, and claimed to be surprised at the extent of the reaction to their story.

== Notable animals ==
- In the early 20th century, Bill Snyder was hired at the zoo; he purchased Hattie, an Asian elephant, in 1920. Hattie died in 1922.
- Pattycake, a female western lowland gorilla, was born at the zoo in 1972 and was thus the first gorilla successfully born in captivity in New York. Her handlers assumed she was a male and originally named her "Sonny Jim". She moved to the Bronx Zoo in 1982, where she remained until her death in 2013.
- Gus, a male polar bear, lived at the zoo from 1988 to 2013, when he had to be euthanized after being diagnosed with an inoperable tumor.
- Flaco, a Eurasian eagle owl, was taken to the zoo in 2010. Flaco escaped when his enclosure was damaged in 2023; he was found dead outside the park in 2024.

== In media ==
The Central Park Zoo is depicted in the 2005 DreamWorks animated film Madagascar as the place from which the main characters escaped, although each species the main cast are based on are not in the real location as of today.
