= Gus (bear) =

Polar bear at the Central Park Zoo

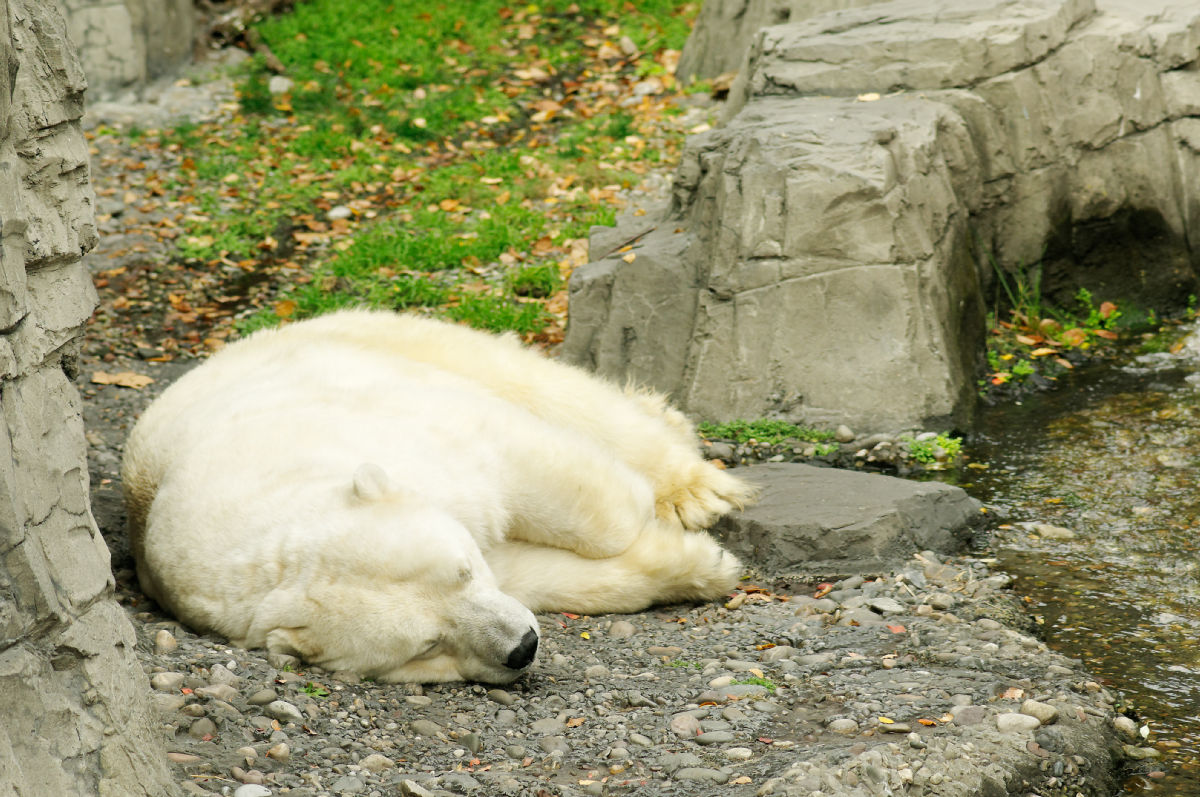
- Gus in November 2011
- Species: Ursus maritimus
- Sex: Male
- Born: 1985; Toledo, Ohio, United States
- Died: August 27, 2013 (aged 27)
- Known for: 'Neurotic' residency at Central Park Zoo in New York City
- Parents: Nanook, Snowball

Gus (1985 – August 27, 2013) was a 700-pound (320 kg) polar bear and icon of the Central Park Zoo in New York City. His exhibit was visited by over 20 million people during his lifetime. He came to public notice in the 1990s, when he began swimming obsessively in his pool for up to 12 hours a day. Reporters dubbed him "neurotic", "depressed", and "flaky", turning him into a "symbol of the stress of living in New York City". As part of his therapy and treatment, Gus was the first zoo animal in history to be treated with Prozac.

== Birth and early life ==
Gus was born in the Toledo Zoo in 1985. His father, Nanook, was sent to the Toledo Zoo from his home in the Bronx Zoo for the purposes of breeding. Gus's mother was named Snowball. In 1988, Gus was moved to the Central Park Zoo.

== Fame ==
In the 1990s, Gus became the "face" of the Central Park Zoo for several media promotions and publications. Gus was seen by an estimated 20 million visitors in his lifetime.

In 1994 zoo officials began noting Gus's unusual behavior in his habitat. He was seen swimming back and forth in a figure eight pattern, again and again, for up to 12 hours a day. Such behavior in captive animals usually points to boredom and stress. The zoo hired an animal behavioral therapist at a cost of $25,000 to determine the reason for Gus's obsessive swimming. According to the therapist, "Gus is just bored and mildly crazy in the way that a lot of people are in New York". He ordered an "enrichment program" for the polar bear that included a redesigned habitat, "challenges" at mealtime, new toys and "positive-reinforcement training sessions". In 2002 the BBC reported that zookeepers had installed a jacuzzi to "cheer up" Gus. Gus was also the first zoo animal in history to be treated with Prozac. After a few months, Gus's obsessive swimming tapered off, but never disappeared entirely. He and his two partners, Lily and Ida, were featured at the 2005 International Conference on Environmental Enrichment.

From the publicity surrounding his diagnosis and treatment, Gus became a symbol of the "neurotic" New Yorker. He was the subject of a 1995 satirical book, What's Worrying Gus?: The True Story of a Big-City Bear, which publishers described as a "timeless tale of the quintessential outsider coping with the harsh reality of New York in the '90s". The cover image depicts Gus in a therapist's office. He was also the subject of two children's books, Gus the Bear, the Flying Cat, and the Lovesick Moose: Twenty Real Life Animal Stories (1995) and Gus: The Feeling-Better Polar Bear (2009), a play titled Gus and the song "Gus: The Polar Bear From Central Park" on the 2004 album In Between Evolution by The Tragically Hip.

== Partners ==
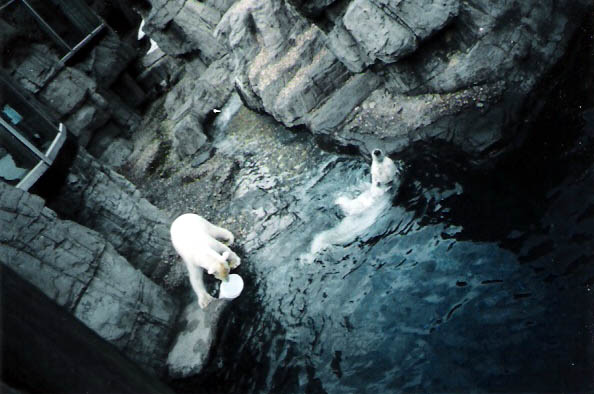
Gus and Ida in April 1999

Gus's partners were Lily, a female polar bear who died in 2004 at age 17, and Ida, who died in 2011 at age 25 of liver disease. He had no offspring.

== Final years ==
According to zoo officials, Gus had exhibited signs of depression since the death of his last partner, Ida, in 2011. In the summer of 2013 he had poor appetite and difficulty chewing and swallowing food. He was placed under anesthesia by zoo veterinarians to determine the cause of his problem; the veterinarians discovered a large, inoperable tumor in the region of his thyroid and decided to euthanize him. At age 27, Gus had exceeded the life expectancy of polar bears in captivity, which averages 20.7 years.

Following Gus's death, the Central Park Zoo closed the exhibit until 2015 when the enclosure re-opened with two new grizzly bears.

== See also ==
- List of individual bears
