= Ali (graffiti artist) =

American artist and musician (1956–1994)

Ali SA UND
- Born: Marc André Edmonds; December 20, 1956; Manhattan, New York City
- Died: April 18, 1994 (aged 37); Tucson, Arizona
- Other name: J. Walter Negro
- Era: 20th century
- Parents: Edgar Overton Edmonds (father); Charyl Edmonds Romo (mother)

Marc André Edmonds (December 20, 1956 – April 18, 1994), also known by the graffiti name ALI and as J. Walter Negro, “The Playin’ Brown Rapper” was an American artist and musician. As ALI, he is best known as the founder of 'Soul Artists' and originator of the cult of Zoo York. As "alter-ego" J. Walter Negro (a cynical take-off on the arch-commercialist J. Walter Thompson advertising agency), he is remembered as the lead singer/songwriter of the proto-hip-hop-rap group 'J. Walter Negro and the Loose Jointz', who had some success with their 1981 release "Shoot the Pump".

== Career ==
Born in Manhattan in 1956 to an African American father, Edgar Overton Edmonds (1926-2002), and Seneca mother, Charyl Edmonds Romo (1928-2004), Marc attended public school on the Upper West Side with future noted graffiti artists SAMO (Jean-Michel Basquiat), Futura 2000 (Lenny McGurr), and COCA 82 (Pablo Calogero). He began street-tagging in 1970, and with his younger brother Michael, founded the early crew The Underground (UND). He went on to found the Soul Artists (SA) several years later, and became a respected subway artist well before the advent of “wildstyle” graffiti art. ALI influenced and inspired fellow SA and UND member BILROCK-161 who started The Rolling Thunder Writers in 1976. (RTW went on to become one of the most famed and prolific of all New York City Subway graffiti clubs with membership including some of the best-known street artists citywide, such as REVOLT, ZEPHYR, MIN-ONE, QUIK, CRUNCH, RICH2, PADE, REGAL 192, BOE, SACH, KEL 139, EL 3, IZ THE WIZ, and HAZE.)

ALI's works often contained humorous or cynical political messages, a trend that led to his establishing and publishing the comic-oriented Zoo York Magazine starting in 1979. (The premier issue was first published in May 1979, and subsequent issues were published in the early 1980s.)

=== Tunnel Fire ===
Late one night in the 1970s, while ALI and Futura 2000 were “bombing” IRT traincars in the lay-up tunnel between the 137th and 145th Street stations under Broadway, a number of spray-paint cans, lined up along what was mistaken to be a “dead” third rail, suddenly exploded, enveloping ALI in flames. Futura got him out and to a local hospital, where he was laid up with severe burns. The fire left scars on his neck and jaw-line, but his wrists and hands took the worst damage. Doctors advised that his hands would have to be amputated, but his Native American mother told them that he was an artist, and he would live or die with his hands attached. So shocking were his burns that a number of early writers "laid up their cans" after visiting him in the hospital; but ALI recovered, though he carried scars from that night for the rest of his life.

=== "Zoo York" ===
A cynical social observer with a quick wit, ALI coined the term "Zoo York" to describe the absurdity displayed in the attitudes of New Yorkers during what he called the Sick Seventies. It was the name he gave to a subway tunnel being built underneath the Central Park Zoo at the time, which became a haunt of graffiti writers in the early 1970s. The tunnel's naming occurred one night in early 1973, after several members of The Underground (UND), ALI, FINE and CRUNCH attended a showing of National Lampoon Lemmings, a new musical-comedy review at the Village Gate in downtown Manhattan. The show (which starred future comic notables John Belushi, Chevy Chase and Christopher Guest) lampooned the Woodstock Festival that had taken place in upstate New York four years earlier, calling it "Woodchuck" and equating the entire hippie generation with lemmings bent on self-destruction. The crew of teenagers made similar comparisons between themselves and the residents of the nearby city zoo. Noting the perversities of contemporary urban psychology, ALI proclaimed New York City itself "not new, but a zoo!"

=== "Shoot the Pump" ===
In 1981, as street hip hop and rapping mainstreamed to popular music, ALI formed a band he named J. Walter Negro and the Loose Jointz, featuring himself as frontman J. Walter Negro, "The Playin' Brown Rapper" (songwriter, vocals), Pablo Calogero (composer of the music of "Shoot The Pump", alto and baritone saxophone, flute) Arturo O'Farrill on keyboards (Fender Rhodes, Hammond Organ, Steinway grand piano), Leonard K. Seeley (guitar, vocals), Tomás Doncker (guitar, vocals), Lonnie D. Hillyer (bass guitar, vocals), H.B. Bennett (drums, vocals). Their first single, "Shoot the Pump," was released first under John Hammond's "Zoo York" imprint, and was later produced overseas on Island Records. A conglomeration of rap, hip hop, Latin funk and disco rock, the song features ALI as “Negro” rap-vocalizing about opening a fire hydrant with a monkey wrench and directing the water blast with a can to soak passing cars and pedestrians by "shooting the pump" at them. Police arrive, see him reaching for something and "shoot the punk"; they then close the hydrant and flee the scene of the crime. But crafty Negro survives thanks to a bullet-proof vest, and he heads off to “shoot the pump” again. The act opened for Talking Heads, Blondie and Kid Creole at The Peppermint Lounge and The Mudd Club in downtown Manhattan. The Loose Jointz had an occasional celebrity guest in Jean-Michel Basquiat, a friend of ALI's well before earning fame; "Shoot the Pump” co-writer Pablo Calogero went on to record music for the soundtrack of Basquiat's New York Beat Movie, Downtown 81.

== Death ==
Edmonds died while struggling with cocaine addiction in Tucson, Arizona on April 18, 1994.
