= Bill Snyder (animal trainer) =

American animal trainer (1864–1934)

William Snyder
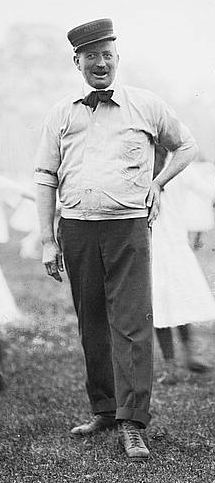
- Born: May 31, 1864; Pine Plains, New York
- Died: April 26, 1934 (aged 69); Pine Plains, New York
- Spouse: Anna "Agnes" Giering
- Children: 1

William Snyder (May 31, 1864 – April 26, 1934) was the head keeper at the Central Park Zoo where he instituted a system of animal swaps with other zoos.

== Biography ==
He was born on May 31, 1864, in Pine Plains, New York, to Christopher Snyder and Eliza Millis.

He had trained elephants at Ringling Bros. and Barnum & Bailey Circus. In 1903 he purchased Hattie, the elephant from Carl Hagenbeck and trained her for the Central Park Zoo. Hattie was named after Snyder's daughter.

He died on April 25, 1934, in Pine Plains, New York.

He was buried in Rock City Cemetery in Rhinebeck, New York.

== Legacy ==
The New York Times said: "As every one familiar with Zoo affairs knows that Snyder has had experiences beside which those of other keepers pale to insignificance, his opinion carries weight" and "his original observations on hitherto undiscovered and unsuspected traits among his charges have made him famous the world over."

== Images ==
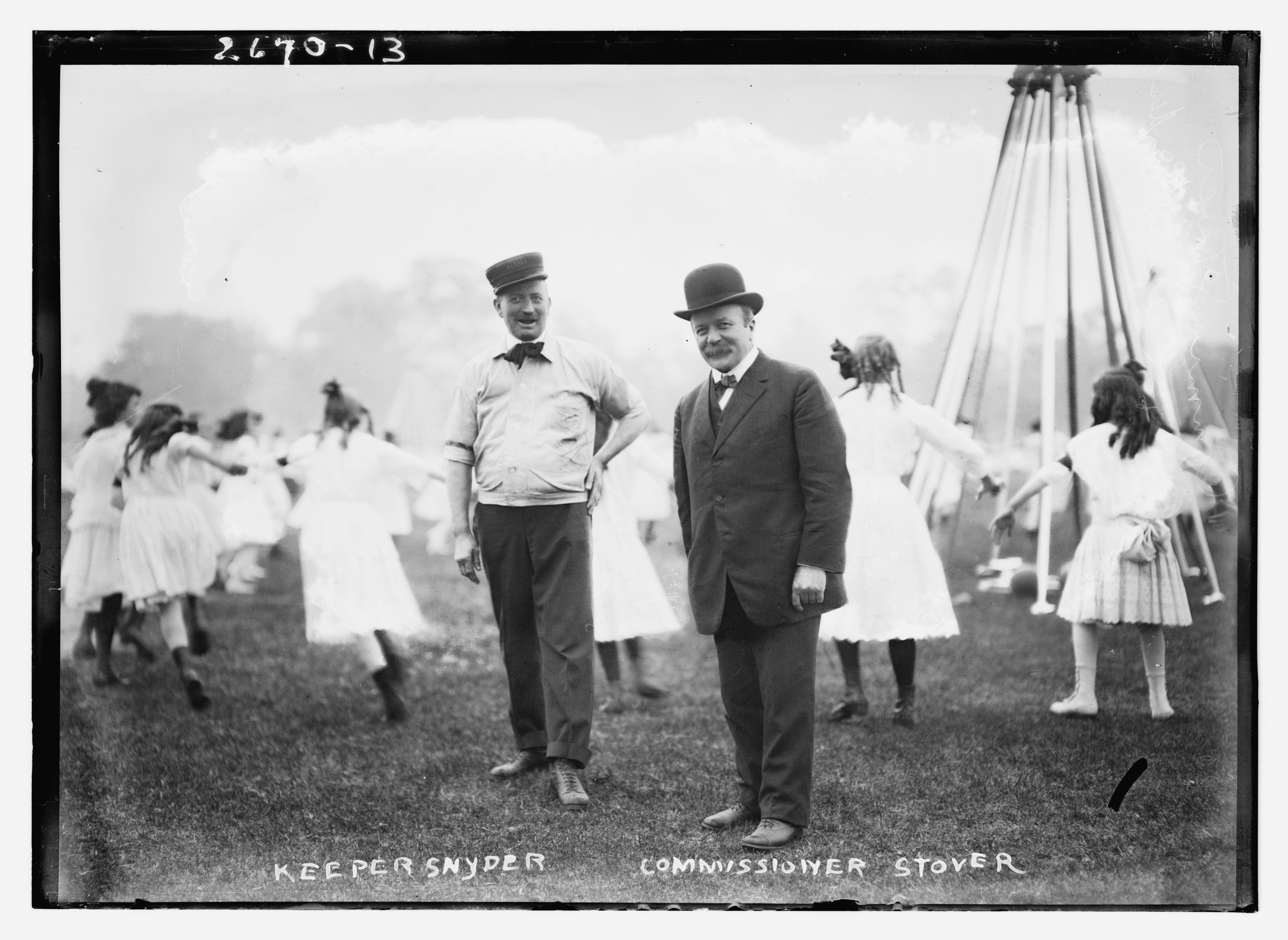
Parks Commissioner Charles Bunstein Stover and Bill Snyder c. 1913 at the Central Park Zoo

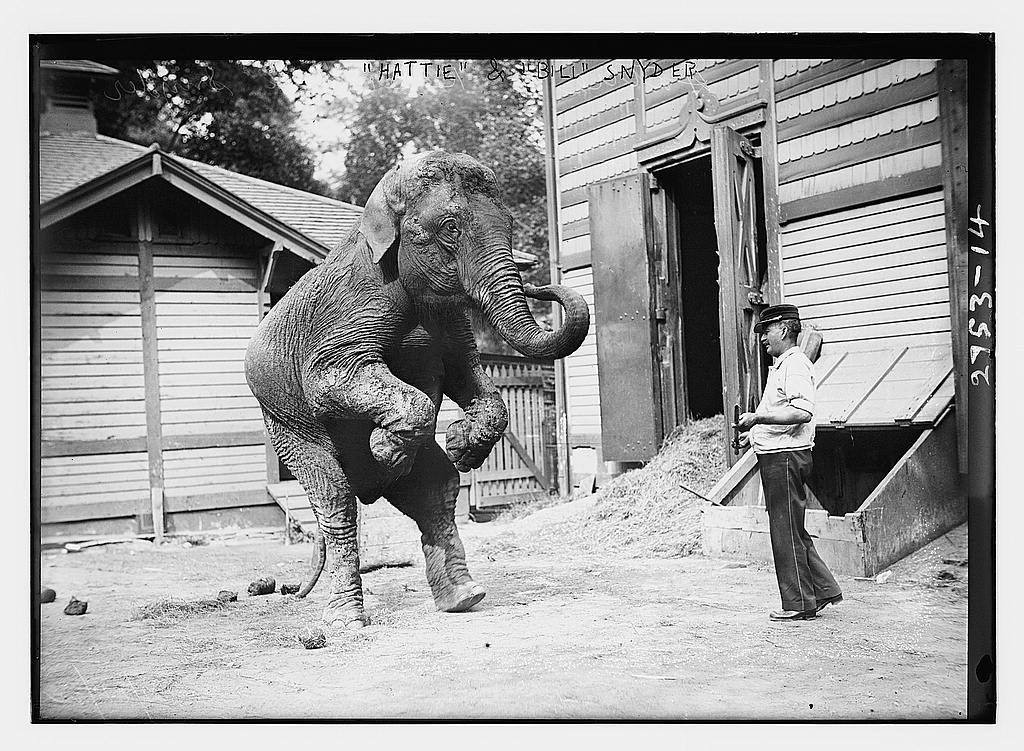
Hattie, the elephant and Bill Snyder c. 1913 at the Central Park Zoo
