= Hattie (elephant) =

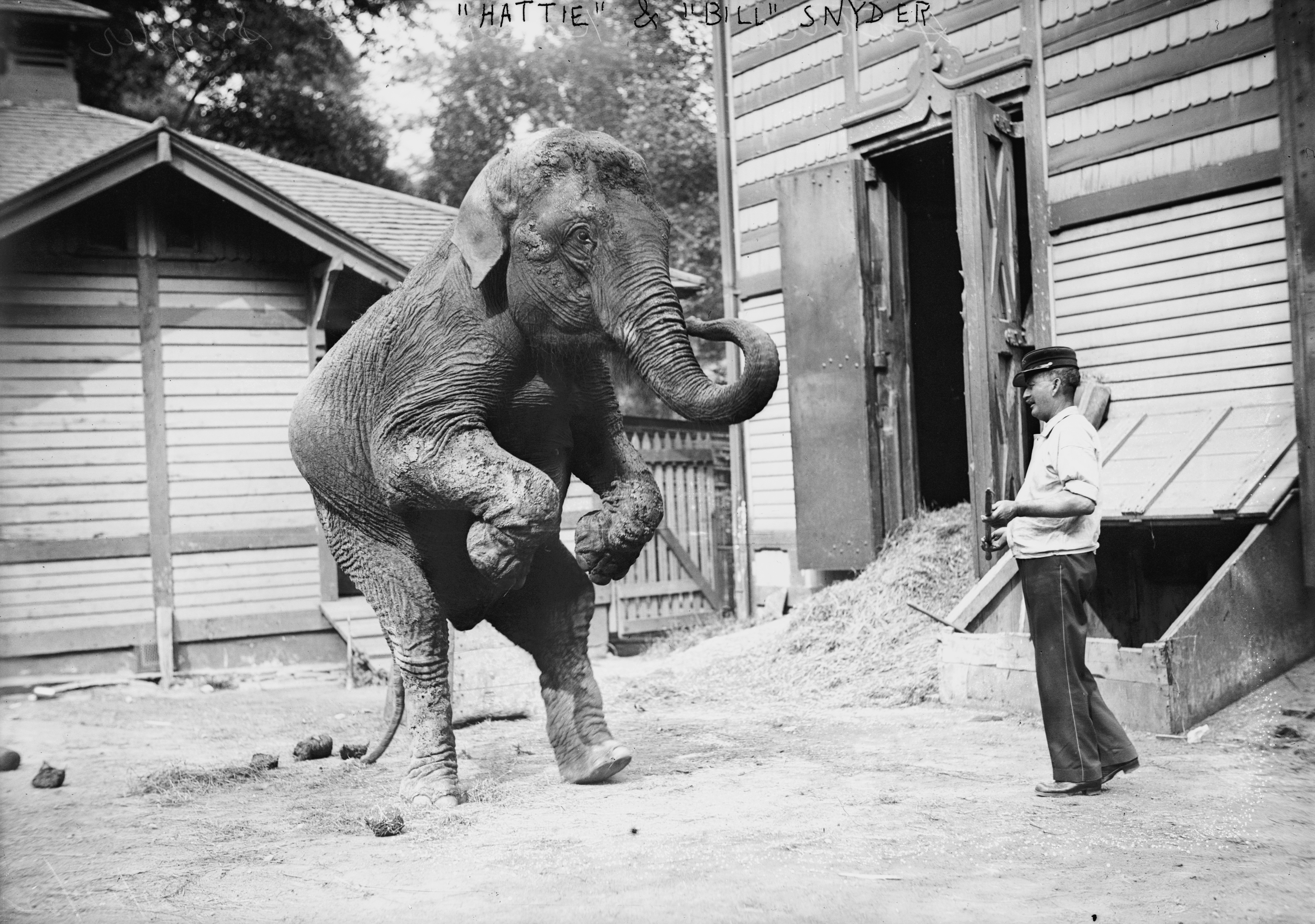
Hattie and Bill Snyder circa 1913

Hattie (died in 1922) was an Asian elephant in New York City's Central Park Zoo that in 1904 was described as the "most intelligent of all elephants". In 1911, she was described as "nearly human".

== History ==
She was purchased for $5,000 and trained by Bill Snyder who had trained elephants at Ringling Bros. and Barnum & Bailey Circus. The elephant had been brought to New York City from Ceylon in 1903 by Carl Hagenbeck. She died in November 1922 at the Central Park Zoo after a week-long illness.

== See also ==
- List of individual elephants
