= Joseph I. C. Clarke =

American dramatist (1846–1925)

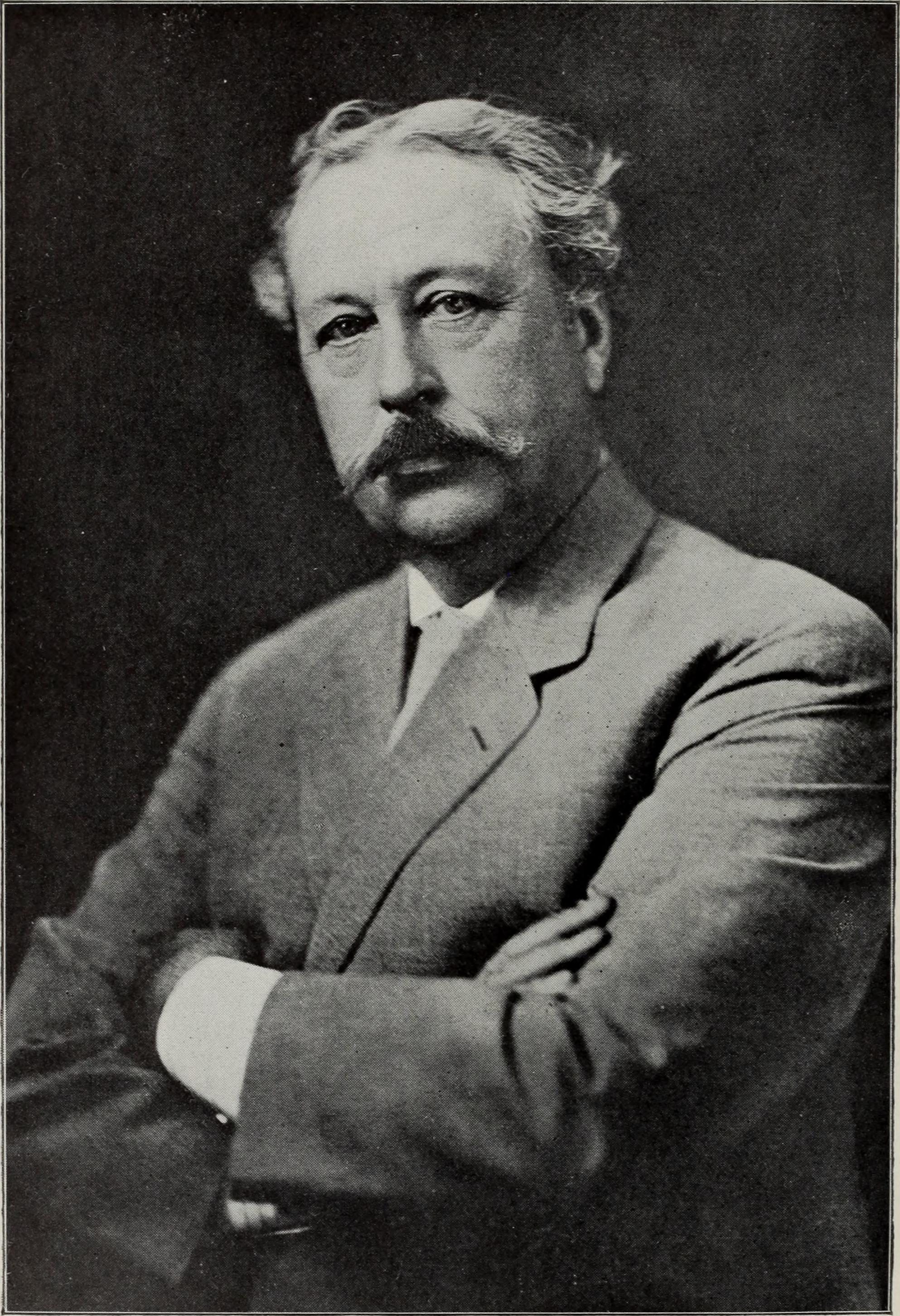
- Clarke in 1898
- Born: Joseph Ignatius Constantine Clarke; 31 July 1846; Kingstown, now Dún Laoghaire, Ireland
- Died: 27 February 1925 (aged 78); New York City, United States
- Occupations: Playwright, writer, poet, journalist, Nationalist

Joseph Ignatius Constantine Clarke (31 July 1846 – 27 February 1925) was an Irish American newspaperman, poet, playwright, writer, and Irish nationalist.

== Biography ==
Clarke was born on 31 July 1846, in Kingstown, now Dún Laoghaire, the port of County Dublin. The family moved to London when he was twelve years old. He worked as a clerk in the Board of Trade. In 1868, for patriotic motives he resigned and went to Paris and then emigrated to the USA. Clarke became a noted journalist and playwright in America. He was the assistant editor of the Irish Times (1868–1870) and then joined the New York Herald. While at the Herald, he authored the 1874 Central Park Zoo Escape hoax, under the direction of managing editor T.B. Connery. He was the managing editor of the New York Morning Journal from 1883–1895, editor of the Criterion from 1898–1900, and of the Sunday edition of the New York Herald from 1903-1906.

A member of the Irish Republican Brotherhood, Clarke wrote Robert Emmet: A Tragedy of Irish History (1888), which told of Emmet's life. He wrote various plays, published poetry, and in 1925, his autobiography: My Life and Memories. His comedy "Her Majesty, the Girl Queen of Nordenmark" ran for seventy-eight performances in 1900 at the Manhattan Theatre.

His friendship with the Japanese chemist Jōkichi Takamine reflected his deep interest with Japan. After visiting Japan in 1914, he published Japan at First Hand and he co-wrote The Imperial Japanese Mission, 1917. He died on 27 February 1925, aged 78, in New York City.
