= Woodward Camp =

Youth summer camp

Coordinates: 40.902161°N 77.368813°W

Woodward Camp or Camp Woodward is a sleep away summer camp in Woodward, Pennsylvania, United States. It was founded in 1970 by Edward Isabelle, who was an All-American gymnast, and head gymnastics coach at Penn State in State College, PA. He partnered with Pat Stillman, an Academic All America football player and entrepreneur,and Robert Ellis to open the camp.

Named after a small town 35 minutes east of State College, Pennsylvania, Woodward started out as a gymnastics camp. When Ed Isabelle’s son, Lou, became interested in BMX racing and suggested a downhill course be built, he started exploring additional sports offering for the camp. When the US decided to boycott the 1980 Olympic games, Woodward Camp expanded its programming to include BMX racing. The BMX program quickly grew and the facilities were expanded to include ramps. Eventually skateboarding and inline skating were added as camp options.
