= Brandon Westgate =

Professional Skateboarder (born 1989)

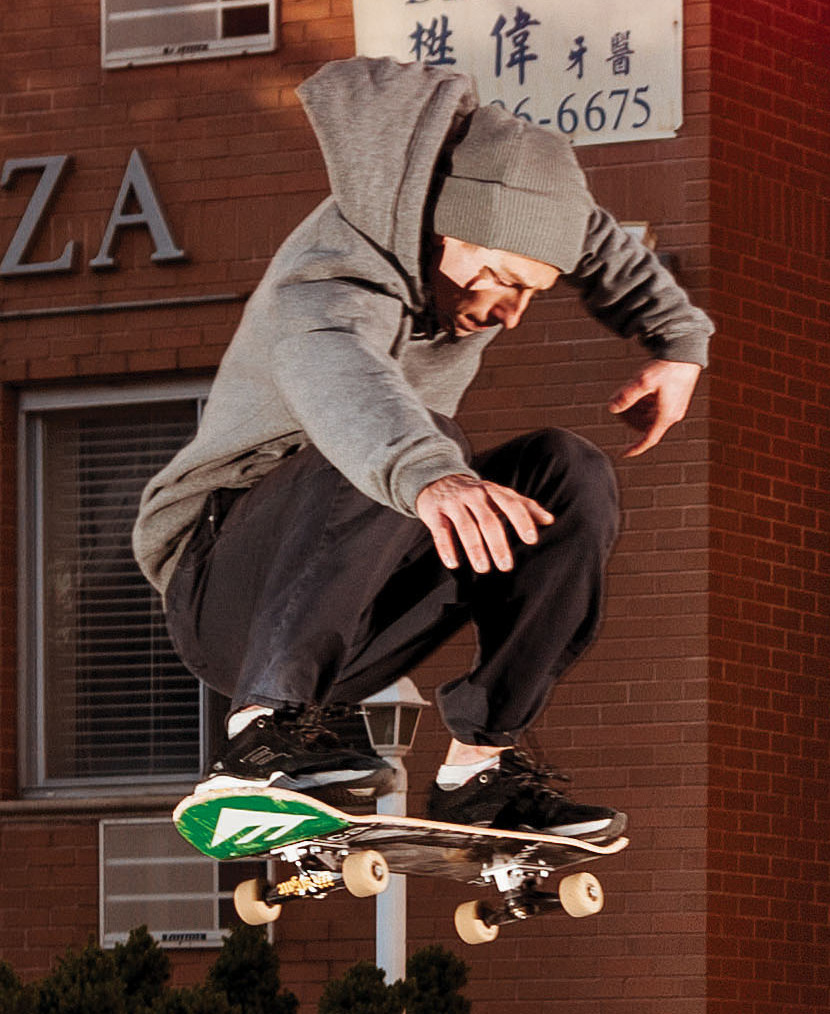
- Westgate doing a flip in 2013
- Born: Brandon Westgate; February 15, 1989 (age 36)
- Occupation: Professional skateboarder

Brandon Westgate (born February 15, 1989) is a professional skateboarder.

== Early life ==
Westgate was born in Wareham, Massachusetts, United States. When he was young, Westgate skated in his hometown and at Skater Island skate park in Middletown, Rhode Island, United States.

== Professional skateboarding ==
In 2003 Westgate started his skateboarding career as a "flow" (a skateboarder's status prior to becoming an amateur where equipment and goods are 'flowed' to them) team rider for 5boro Skateboards. He gained some attention for his Word of Mouth part in 2004 (it was later identified in the "Classics" segment of Thrasher magazine), but left 5Boro to join Birdhouse Skateboards in October 2005, a company founded and owned by professional skateboarder Tony Hawk.

In 2007 Westgate joined Zoo York Skateboards, followed by Emerica footwear in 2008—he would later attain professional status with Zoo York in May 2009 and released his first professional model Emerica shoe in early 2011.

Alongside other professional skateboarders such as Ishod Wair and Nyjah Huston, Westgate was nominated for Thrasher Magazine's 2013 "Skater Of The Year" (SOTY) award in December 2013. The publication summarized Westgate's 2013 performance in the following manner: "Emerica's Made saw Westgate returning to the streets of SF [San Francisco] to put the final nail in the coffin at that old lady's house before cruising the U.S. - ollieing and flipping his way up, over and onto ever more gigantic obstacles including a neck-high natty euro gap and that hellacious three flip flyover. "

=== Sponsors ===
As of March 2021, Westgate is sponsored by Element, Ricta, Venture, Bones Bearings, Mob Grip, CCS, and New Balance.

He has two pro model shoes on New Balance Numeric, the Brandon Westgate NM913 released in 2020 and the 508.

== Personal life ==
As of September 2013, Westgate, together with his girlfriend, is a vegetarian. The pair reside together, grow a garden, and raise chickens—Westgate has built a chicken coop and, as of September 2013, is in the process of constructing a greenhouse for his mother. When asked about his vegetarianism in 2013, Westgate explained:

Green apple, carrot, celery, parsley, ginger, kale, maybe a little bit of lemon or something, but that’s a standard juice we make ... I think the best thing to do, even if you’re not vegetarian, is to juice vegetables. There’s no possible way to eat all that—you can’t consume it all. So you drink it and get all the nutrients, and also it gets in your body faster because your body doesn’t have to break it down or anything. Juicing is one of the best things to do to heal or replenish your body and get rid of all the toxins ... When I’d go on trips I’d just feel like shit and eat like shit ... I think I just feel healthier in general.

Westgate further explained that his girlfriend influenced him to become a vegetarian.

== Videography ==
- 5boro: Word of Mouth (2004)
- Zoo York: Welcome To Zoo York City (2006)
- Emerica: Wild Ride 2007 (2007)
- Thrasher: King Of The Road 2007 (2007)
- Transworld: Skate & Create (2008)
- Volcom: All The Days Roll Into One (2008)
- Zoo York: State of Mind (2009)
- Emerica: Stay Gold (2010)
- Emerica: Brandon Westgate: New Shoe, New Part (2011)
- Zoo York: True East (2012)
- Emerica: Made: Chapter One (2013)
- Zoo York: Zoo England (2014)
- Element: Welcome to the Family (2015)
- WAR and PEACE (2019)
