= Zoo York (Central Park) =

Style and social philosophy

Zoo York is a style and social philosophy inspired by the New York City graffiti art subculture of the 1970s. Its name originates from a subway tunnel running underneath the area of the Central Park Zoo. This tunnel, called the Zoo York Tunnel, or simply "Zoo York," was a haunt of very early "old school" graffiti writers who hung out with the hippies around the Central Park Bandshell in the late 1960s and 1970s.

== Zoo York Tunnel ==
Dubbed "Zoo York" by graffiti pioneer and rapper ALI (Marc Edmonds), founder of the Soul Artists, the subway tunnel provided a "scene" where crews of Manhattan graffiti artists gathered at night. The tunnel itself was a cut-and-cover construction project built through Central Park from 1971 to 1973. Extensions of the New York City Subway's BMT Broadway Line and IND Sixth Avenue Line, continued north from their former 57th Street–Seventh Avenue station (BMT) and 57th Street (IND) stations, merged just south of the City Zoo, then snaked underneath the zoo grounds and out under Fifth Avenue, where they connected to the recently completed 63rd Street Line and bellmouths for the Second Avenue Subway.

During construction, the site was left unguarded at night. Unauthorized entry was discouraged by a tall aluminum-sheathed wall erected around the open ground by the New York City Transit Authority—but this hardly deterred local graffiti writers from boosting one another over it and climbing down into the tunnel below. Down inside the tunnel, there were four subway tracks (uptown and downtown IND and BMT tracks on two levels; downtown tracks on upper level, uptown tracks on lower level) constructed on two levels about 100 feet (30 m) underneath the park, creating something of a subterranean monkey-house environment for invading street kids to climb around and scrawl graffiti on.

== Tagging the wall ==
Graffiti artists also marked their territory by "tagging" the wall which had been put up around the construction site. A photograph of the extinct Zoo York Wall is prominently displayed on the second page of The Faith of Graffiti, the noted 1974 photo essay book on New York City graffiti (documented by Mervyn Kurlansky and John Naar, with text by Norman Mailer. Praeger Publishers, Inc.)

== Origins of name ==
A cynical social observer with a quick wit, ALI coined the term "Zoo York" to describe the absurdity displayed in the attitudes and actions of New Yorkers during what he called the "Sick Seventies"—particularly as exemplified by what he saw at the Central Park subway tunnel site late at night. The tunnel's naming occurred when a crew of graffiti artists calling themselves The Underground (UND) gathered at the site late one autumn night in 1971. Several of them, ALI, FINE, KITE (aka CRUNCH) and ACEY (aka SIE-1), had just attended a showing of a new musical-comedy review called National Lampoon's Lemmings at the Village Gate downtown. The show (which starred future comic notables John Belushi, Chevy Chase and Christopher Guest) lampooned the Woodstock Festival, which had taken place upstate two years earlier—calling it "Woodchuck" and equating the entire hippie generation with lemmings bent on self-destruction. The crew of teenagers made similar comparisons between themselves and the animals in the nearby zoo.

The Central Park Zoo at that time was a classical 19th-century menagerie, populated by wild animals displayed in open-air cages, who paced the bars back and forth neurotically—always hoping for an escape, yet paradoxically blind to the world beyond their cramped quarters. ALI noted that by contrast, here were these feral teenagers, himself included, living in a free society, who sought nothing more wholeheartedly than to crowd together in a deep, dark hole in the ground. Marvelling at their perverse urban psychologies, ALI decided that all city people were insane for seeking imprisonment in tiny apartments, offices, subway cars and the like, and declared that New York City itself was "not New, but a Zoo!" He named the tunnel itself "Zoo York"—a perfect symbol, in his mind, of the dark psyche of the inner city itself.
