= Harold Hunter =

American skateboarder and actor (1974–2006)

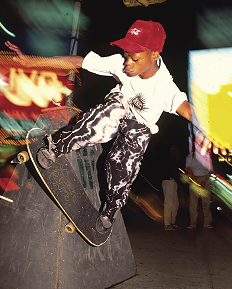
- Hunter in Times Square, 1989
- Born: Harold Atkins Hunter; April 2, 1974; New York City, U.S.
- Died: February 17, 2006 (aged 31); New York City, U.S.
- Occupations: Professional skateboarder; actor
- Years active: 1989–2006

Harold Atkins Hunter (April 2, 1974 – February 17, 2006) was an American professional skateboarder and actor. He played the role of Harold in Larry Clark's 1995 film Kids.

== Career ==
Hunter was born in New York City and grew up in a housing project in the East Village with his two brothers. He became associated with a skate crew that hung out near Tompkins Square Park and Washington Square Park and was first sponsored by local skate shop called Skate NYC.

Hunter first came to public attention in 1989 in a Thrasher magazine photo essay photographed by Charlie Samuels about the New York City skateboard scene. A goofy-footed skateboarder, Hunter was sponsored most notably by Zoo York. Later on he started Rock Star Bearings Co.

In 1995, Hunter appeared as Harold in Larry Clark's Kids, a film about teenagers in the East Village. He also appeared in the critically acclaimed TV series Kung Faux performing various voice-overs, and on an episode of the TV series Miami Ink. In the episode, he received a tattoo from Chris Garver that commemorated his New York roots and his connections from his youth with the World Trade Center. The tattoo was on his upper arm and depicted the towers with a skateboarder jumping in front of them, with the words "New York City" above and "Sk-8 or Die" below. This tattoo is revisited in another episode of Miami Ink that focuses on Chris Garver's tattoos.

== Death ==
On February 17, 2006, Hunter was found dead from a cocaine-induced heart attack in his Lower East Side apartment. The Harold Hunter Foundation was founded in his memory to support city kids interested in skateboarding. He is buried in Woodlawn Cemetery in The Bronx.

== Filmography ==
- New Jersey Drive (1995)
- Kids (1995)
- Mind Games (1996)
- Hand on the Pump (1998)
- Common- One-Nine-Nine-Nine(music video) (1999)
- Frezno Smooth (1999)
- Save the Last Dance (2001)
- Kung Faux (2003)
- Man Under Wire (2005)
