= Zoo York (company) =

American skateboarding and apparel company

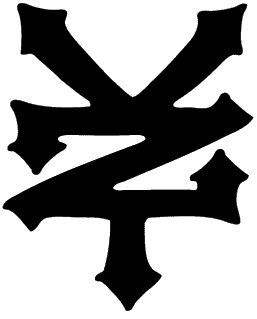
- Type: Subsidiary
- Traded as: Nasdaq: ICON
- Industry: Skateboarding, textile
- Founded: 1993; 33 years ago
- Founders: Rodney Smith; Eli Morgan Gesner; Adam Schatz
- Headquarters: New York City, US
- Area served: Worldwide
- Products: Skateboards, t-shirts, hoodies, windbreakers, hats, fanny packs, sunglasses
- Parent: Iconix Brand Group
- Website: zooyork.com

Zoo York is an American company focused on the skateboarding market. The company currently commercializes skateboards, t-shirts, hoodies, windbreakers, hats, and fanny packs.

The company's name was taken from one of NYC's oldest skate crews, Soul Artists of Zoo York.

== History ==
The company was founded in 1998 by skateboarders Rodney Smith, Eli Morgan Gesner, and Adam Schatz, who started their own business after Smith's company, Shut, lost a legal battle over trademark infringement. The company established itself as the major firm in the East Coast due to the adding of graffiti and hip-hop culture to their designs. The company was first sold to Marc Eckō in 2001; four years later, the Zoo York brand sold the rights to use its name to the Iconix Brand Group.

In 2019, the founding partners returned to Zoo York as creative directors with the purposes of bringing strategic, design, and marketing insight to the brand. The directors also focused on new licensees and partnerships. Iconix Brand CEO Bob Galvin state that "partnering with the creators of Zoo York will help us reconnect to the brand's origins in New York City street culture and regain credibility".

== Media ==
Zoo York Skater Brandon Westgate doing a frontside flip in Queens, New York City

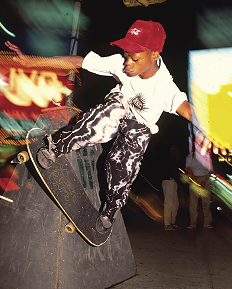
Zoo York Skater Harold Hunter does a wallride in Times Square in 1989

The company produced a popular VHS mixtape series.

- Mix Tape (1998)
- Peep This (1999)
- Heads (1999)
- E.S.T (2000)
- E.S.T 2.0 (2001)
- E.S.T 3.0 (2002)
- Unbreakable: Mix Tape 2 (2002)
- City Of Killers (2003)
- E.S.T 4 (2004)
- Ellis Island (2005)
- Vicious Cycle (2005)
- Welcome to Zoo York City (2006)
- State of Mind (2009)
- Z.Y Field Agent Report (2010)
- the Chaz Ortiz video (2012)
- true east (2013)
- King of New York (2013)
- Eastern Conference (2016)

Zoo York produced a television show on Fuel TV called Skate Maps which shows the Zoo York team on tour. In 2007, Zoo York's team appeared on Thrasher Magazine's cross country skateboarding contest, "King of the Road."

== Former team riders ==
Brandon Westgate, Burton Smith, Harold Hunter, Ricky Oyola, Danny Supa, Quim Cardona, Chaz Ortiz, Hamilton Harris, Jamie Story, Zered Bassett, Justin Pierce, among others.
