= Rodney Smith (skateboarder) =

American skateboarder and businessman

Rodney Smith is an American professional skateboarder, entrepreneur, and skate company founder from New York City.

== Career ==
=== Shut Skates ===
Smith founded Shut Skates in 1986 with Bruno Musso. Shut Skates was New York City's first skate company and the world's first entirely street skate-based company. Shortly after its founding, Shut Skates moved its operations from Southern California to New York City, due to the urban, street-savvy attitude of the streets of the East Coast, compared to the former's emphasis on surf culture. The brand went dark in the 1990s when Smith co-founded Zoo York with Eli Morgan Gessner and Adam Schatz. SHUT relaunched in 2006, and in 2007, the company reopened their flagship skate shop on the Lower East Side. The storefront space served the community for 10 years, closing in 2017 with the business moving online.

=== Zoo York ===
In 1993, Smith, Eli Morgan Gesner, and Adam Schatz founded Zoo York. In 2019, the trio that founded Zoo York was brought back into the company.

=== All One Universe ===
In the 2010s, Smith founded skate and lifestyle brand ALL ONE, also known as All One Universe.
