= Mark Whiteley =

American skateboarder, photographer, and magazine editor

- Born: Los Altos, CA
- Occupation(s): Photographer, magazine editor

Mark Whiteley is an American skateboarder, photographer, writer, and former editor-in-chief of Slap Magazine.

== Skateboarding ==
Whiteley was a video filmer during high school and college. He worked for 411, Think, Real, Stereo, Thrasher, Santa Cruz, and other companies. Working in the Northern California skateboarding industry, Whiteley got to know a good deal of skaters and others through being out skating and filming.

=== Slap Magazine ===
Lance Dawes, the original editor of SLAP, was looking for an assistant-type editor when Phil Shao and Paul Zuanich recommended Whiteley to Dawes. After a positive meeting with Fausto Vitello, Whiteley started working at Slap Magazine on August 10, 1998 as managing editor. One year after Whiteley began working at Slap, Lance Dawes moved down to Los Angeles and Whiteley was handed the editor-in-chief reigns.

== Photography ==
Whiteley conducted a series of interviews focused around skateboarding and photography. The interview series titled Rolling Through the Shadows was sponsored by Leica Camera.

=== Photography books ===
We Are All in the Gutter But Some Of Us Are Holding Flashes – 2015

This Is Not A Photo Opportunity – 2009
