= Joe Brook =

American photographer

- Born: 1972 (age 53–54); Detroit, MI
- Occupation: Skateboarding photographer
- Years active: 1990–present
- Children: Abby Brook Archer Brook
- Website: www.joebrook.com

Joe Brook (born 1972) is an American photographer. He has been a staff photographer for Thrasher Magazine for over 20 years.

== Early life and education ==
Brook grew up riding bmx and later on found a passion for skateboarding in Detroit and moved to San Francisco at the end of high school with $500 from his bmx bikes that he sold, a duffel bag, and a skateboard. Soon after arriving to the city, He moved into 824 Hyde Street, an unofficial San Francisco skate hostel where Brook would live for 15 years.

While living in San Francisco, Brook took photo classes at City College of San Francisco and spent time skating with acclaimed local skate filmers and photographers including Aaron Meza, Gabe Morford, Bryce Kanights, and Dave Metty.

== Photography career ==
Brook was introduced to photographer and magazine editor Lance Dawes by Aaron Meza, while Brook also became friends with Mark Whiteley from the local SF skate scene. After a few years of learning the craft, Brook began contributing to Slap magazine, run by Dawes and Whiteley. When Dawes announced he was moving to Los Angeles and leaving his role at Slap, Dawes and Whiteley asked Brook if he wanted to be a photo editor and photographer for Slap.

Brook has photographed skateboarding for over 30 years, working for magazines including Slap, Thrasher, and Juxtapoz.

Brook drives a van painted with an American flag called 'Big Blue' which he has crossed America many times in. In 2011, éS released a Joe Brook colorway of their Square Two Fusion shoe to honor his contributions to skateboarding.

In 2016, Brook showed 20 years of skate photography at the Growlery in a show titled Defining a Distance. Tommy Guerrero performed at the opening.
