= John Cardiel =

American skateboarder (born 1973)

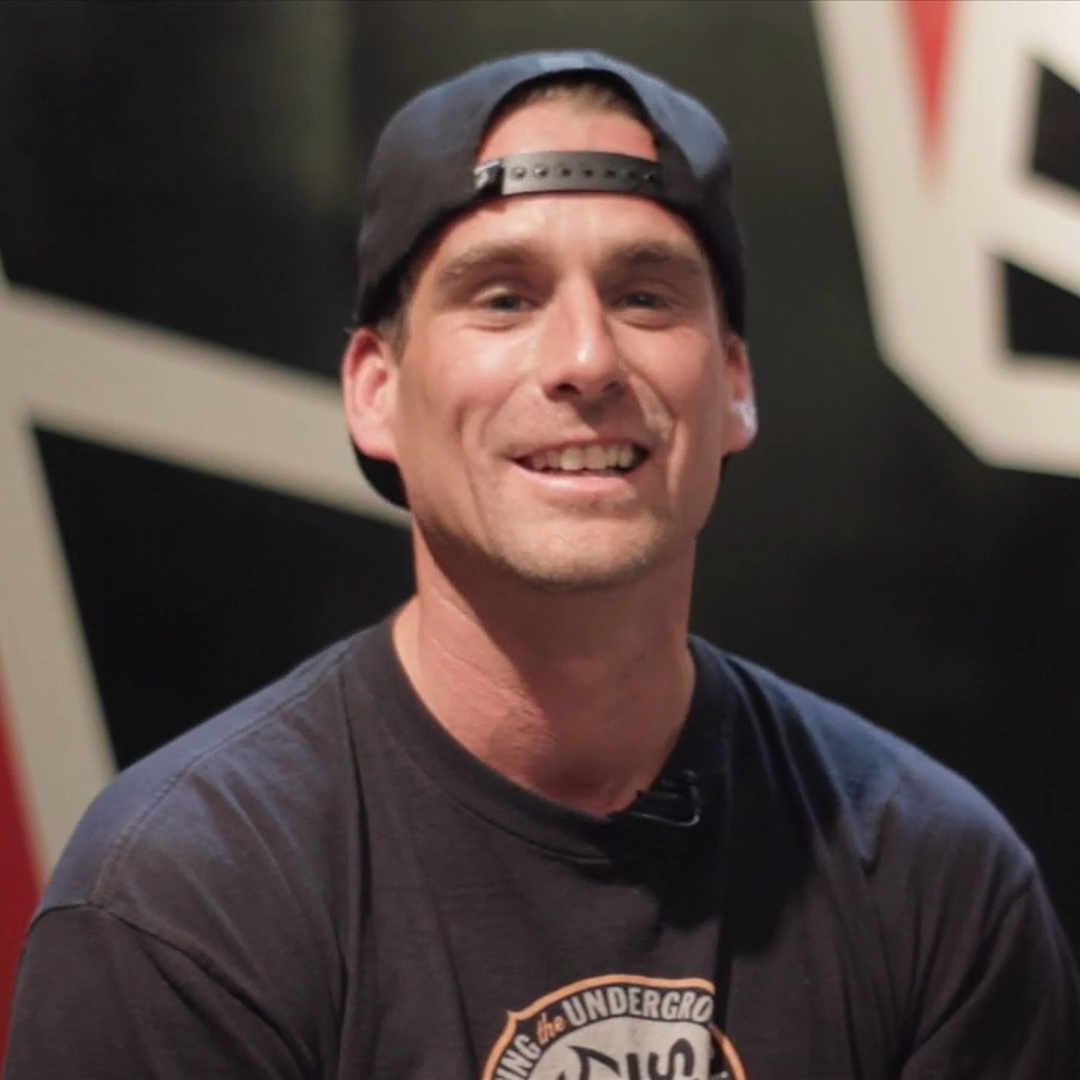
- Cardiel being interviewed in 2012
- Born: December 14, 1973 (age 51); San Jose, California, U.S.
- Other names: John Cards, John Cardie, Jumbo Cajones
- Occupation(s): Professional skateboarder, professional snowboarder, bicycle builder

John Joseph Cardiel (born December 14, 1973) is an American former professional skateboarder and snowboarder who has been a known core member of the Anti Hero Skateboards company since it was founded in 1995.

== Early life ==
Cardiel was born in San Jose, California, and grew up in Half Moon Bay and Grass Valley. When asked by prominent skateboard photographer Tobin Yelland in a 1998 Transworld Skateboarding interview, "When you were younger and skating with all your friends, did you ever think you'd get sponsored?", Cardiel replied:

No, not at all. It wasn't about getting sponsored, it was about skating. If you constantly think about getting sponsored, the only reason you're skating is to get on a team. It just worked out for me. I think the majority of skaters who are sponsored weren't really thinking about it all the time. They just wanted to get away from home and skate.

== Professional skateboarding ==
=== Sponsors ===
As of January 2016, Cardiel's sponsors are Vans, AntiHero, Spitfire, Independent Truck Company and Chrome Industries.

=== AntiHero ===
AntiHero is a board company that was founded by professional skateboarder, Julien Stranger, in 1995, following a proposition from Jim Thiebaud (co-founder and owner of Deluxe Distribution), who is reported—by Jake Phelps, editor-in-chief of Thrasher magazine—to have offered Stranger the opportunity during a period of time when both Stranger and Phelps perceived skateboarding as "stale". Stranger has explained the original concept that underpinned AntiHero in the following manner: "Oh, there's was no concept ... well, maybe there was, I don't know. Just kind of balance out the rest, or something, with what was going on with us." Phelps has stated further to Stranger's vague explanation:

I think if you pay attention to life and the way things are, that you, you come out pretty jaded by, you know, life. Or things aren't the way they should be. I think AntiHero is a reflection of that. I think Julian's own twisted take on things has been, like I said, there's no expectation—we just skate, we fuck off, we have a good time. We go to trips sometimes and nothing happened. Or sometime we go on a trip and everything happens at once; you never know. And I think that that translates very much into John's way of life—whether it's hunting, fishing, or whatever, John's [Cardiel] an outdoorsman, and I think that, that hearty spirit of America translated very well with Julian's gritty grime of, like, the city slime, into making a really solid, 'This is what it is to us.'

Cardiel and Stranger first met at an amateur skateboarder contest that was held at the Powell skateboards warehouse—the contest was held around 1990/1991.

In the fall 2012 catalogue release of AntiHero, Cardiel's signature skateboard decks are included in the same series as the currently active riders.

=== Skateboarding influences ===
Cardiel listed his top skateboarding influences of all time in an interview with the Transworld Skateboarding magazine: Mark Gonzales ("just his way of looking at skateboarding, and just approaching it, is just like, forever, the gnarliest thing"), Christian Hosoi ("for just his raw blasting airs; his smooth style; his happy-go-lucky attitude; he was always, like, 'What's up?!', just, like, love"), Sacramento skateboarders ("you know, Rick Windsor, straight up."), and Tony Hawk ("the insane 540s with no hands, and, just like, all his tricks; he had the ramps, all his ramps, all the ramps he had—I thought that was insane. Tony Hawk's the best."). Cardiel identified Gonzales as his top all-time influence, stating: "just everything—vert, street, like, whatever. Running, you know? Like, he's a great jumper, on feet... Just a human being, like, so, I'll give it up to Mark."

In an interview, published in January 2013, Cardiel explained his influences more generally:

Basically, just like the kids around town—you know what I mean? The gnarly rippers around town, there was this dude, his name was 'Erik Benthin'. So, that was, basically, what inspired me in the beginning. Just, Raven Tershay, ... Emmanuel Guzman, ... I see, just a lot of, a lot of good skating right now. You know, like, I mean, Paul Rodriguez, like, these dudes are so, on their stuff, and, ... it's just, almost insane. It's like, ah, kung fu, like, I wanna say, ... kind of like Bruce Lee, martial arts type of thing. And they've excelled to a level where they're just, like, masters, you know? It's like, ... impressive.

=== Influence ===
Writing for Transworld Skateboarding in 1993, Simon Woodstock explained his perspective on Cardiel's influence on skateboarding at the time: "The mark John is making on the skate scene is like a terminal illness. He can never be cured and he just won't go away. John is just 100 percent balls out all the time, and he is destined to win and become a legend in his own time. If cojones were measured by the size of eggs, John Cardiel's would be those of an ostrich."

In December 2011, Transworld Skateboarding magazine listed Cardiel as number eleven in its "30 Most Influential Skaters of All Time" article.

During the introduction of Cardiel's Sight Unseen video part, Mark Gonzales describes his view of Cardiel's skateboarding to the video's audience:

First off, he's an original; his style—there's not too many people who skate like him. The way he skates is amazing, 'cause he'll skate so fast, but it seems like the faster he goes, the more control he has ... which is, you know, unexplainable. But he's unbelievable. I'm not trying to kiss too much butt, but he's a ripper, an original ripper ... He's an original Coors.

== Accident ==
In 2004, at the end of a four-week Australian road trip from Brisbane to Melbourne (the touring skateboarders were filming for the skateboard movie, Tent City), Cardiel was running alongside a van when he was hit by the trailer the van was pulling and then run over by the trailer. Cardiel consequently sustained a spinal cord injury and Cardiel and his mother were informed by the treating medical staff that he would not be able to walk again; however, following five months of hospital-based rehabilitation and six to twelve months in a wheelchair, Cardiel regained the use of his legs.

After a hiatus, Cardiel was featured in the 2008 street fixed gear cycling film Macaframa, directed by Colin Arlen and Colby Elrick. Cardiel attributes his recovery to cycling and continues to be an advocate of street fixed gear cycling.

In 2015, he was featured in the Vans Propeller video with some of his first skateboarding footage since the accident.

== Video game appearances ==
Cardiel appears as a playable character in the PlayStation video game Grind Session, as well as the Electronic Arts video games Skate 2 and Skate 3.

== Tributes ==
In the final section of his part in Almost: Round Three, professional skateboarder, Daewon Song, dedicates the trick to Cardiel and another person.

"All Hail Cardiel" is a tribute song in honor of Cardiel that was written and performed by Bad Shit, a band featuring Jake Phelps (editor of Thrasher magazine), Tony Trujillo (professional skateboarder), and Trixie (Trujillo's wife).

In 2010, a skate punk band was formed in Mexico City under the name "Cardiel" as a tribute, and the band has obtained international recognition in the skate music scene.

In September 2012, longtime Transworld staff member and videographer, Jon Holland, selected Cardiel's Sight Unseen contribution as his favorite Transworld Skateboarding (TWS) video part.

== Perspectives ==
In regard to the concept of skateboard sponsorship, Cardiel provided a detailed explanation of his perspective in 1998:

[Skateboarding] has nothing to do with being sponsored. Skating is the more you skate, the more you're into it, and the better you get ... Eventually you'll get sponsored or whatever. I hope kids aren't just out there skating to get sponsored ... It seems like if you already had that in you, to go skate as much as possible, if that happens [if you get sponsored], you still won't lose touch with what you're really doing it for—to have fun ... Why have the goal of getting sponsored and going pro? Who cares? There's no goal, it's like skating. And that's what's cool, there's so many people out there skating who aren't pro and aren't like that. And those are the people you're hanging out with.

== Awards ==
- Skater of the Year – 1992
- Skateboarding Hall of Fame – 2015

== Personal life ==
As of 2012, Cardiel resides in Sacramento, California, and stated in July 2012 that even though he has developed a strong interest fixed-gear cycling ("I've been into bikes since before skating. It was the first way to get far away from the house and a taste of some freedom"), he "can't imagine" his life without skateboarding and that he was still "skaterniverous" ("I eat it!"). In a 2011 interview with Australian skateboarding magazine SLAM Cardiel explained that, since recovering from the Australian accident, he has purchased a set of turntables and a mixer for playing music and will perform at events—Cardiel has also supported fellow professional skateboarder/musician Ray Barbee during the latter's musical performances. Cardiel further stated, "At one point I'd like to open a skate shop and bike shop, but I don't have the time right now."

As of February 2013, Cardiel owns and operates a business named "Break Free Customs" that primarily sells custom bikes—built by Cardiel himself—in addition to skateboard decks, stickers, and shirts.
