= Phil Shao =

American professional skateboarder and journalist

Personal information
- Nationality: American
- Born: December 28, 1973 San Dimas, California
- Died: August 23, 1998 (aged 24) Arcata, California

Sport
- Country: U.S.

Phil Shao (December 28, 1973 - August 23, 1998) was a goofy-footed professional skateboarder and journalist from Redwood City, California. Before his death, Shao was to be the next editor-in-chief of Thrasher magazine.

== Skateboarding career ==
Shao was featured in many skate magazines including Thrasher Magazine, Big Brother Skateboard Magazine, Skateboarder Magazine, TransWorld Skateboarding. Shao graced the July 1996 cover of Thrasher magazine with a smith grind on the top rail at Fort Miley. Shao was known as a master of many different styles of skating including street and vert. Jake Phelps refers to Shao as "Hosoi and the Gonz in one dude."

Shao appeared in many skateboarding videos in his career, traveling the world to skateboard. His last video was "Dedications" from Think Skateboards, released shortly before his death.

=== Skate video parts ===
- 1994 - Just Another Day On The Range - Think
- 1994 - Issue 8 - 411VM
- 1995 - High 5 - Etnies
- 1996 - Jim's Ramp Jam - Deluxe
- 1996 - Hitting The Streets - Thrasher
- 1996 - Damage - Think
- 1997 - Yellow - Emerica
- 1998 - Portable Flat Bar
- 1998 - Dedication - Think

== Journalism ==
=== Thrasher Magazine ===
In addition to skating, Shao worked at Thrasher magazine as a copy editor. Shortly before his untimely death, Phil was informed he was to be named Editor of Thrasher Magazine. After Shao's passing, Jake Phelps stayed on as Editor-in-chief.

== Death ==
On August 23, 1998, Phil Shao died in a car accident in Arcata, California.

=== Phil Shao Memorial Skate Park ===
In the summer of 2003, Redwood City collaborated with Phil's friends and family to build a skatepark dedicated to Phil called the Phil Shao Memorial Skate Park. The park is a 13,000 square foot skatepark with 5 bowls, rails, and ledges.

== Personal life ==
Shao had an English degree from the University of California at Berkeley.
