= Milton Martinez =

Argentine skateboarder (born 1991)

- Born: March 5, 1991 (age 34); Mar del Plata, Argentina
- Occupation: Skateboarder

Milton Martinez (born March 5, 1991) is an Argentine professional skateboarder. In 2019, Martinez was named Thrasher's Skater of the Year.

== Early life ==
Milton was born and raised in Mar del Plata, Argentina. He was born into a family of skateboarders, and was introduced to skating by his father Tatu at a young age. Milton's family owned and lived in a skateshop in Mar del Plata. He participated in skateboard contests throughout his childhood, and soon picked up several sponsorships. At the age of 16, he put off school and traveled to Europe to pursue skating.

== Skateboarding career ==
=== Sunset Carwash kickflip ===
In April 2015, Milton broke his leg after attempting to ollie into the Sunset Carwash bank on Sunset Boulevard in Hollywood, California. He returned to the spot in 2019 and landed a kickflip into the bank. A photo of the kickflip was used as the December 2019 cover of Thrasher Magazine, and video of the kickflip was used as the last clip in his ¡DEMOLICIÓN! video part.

Martinez was the first person to land a flip trick into the bank. Prior to his kickflip, the only other recorded tricks landed at that spot were an early-grab by John Cardiel, an ollie by Daniel Monkress for the Kre-Per Show video, and one by Jim Greco for Baker 3 in the same year. Other skateboarders had tried and failed to do tricks into the carwash bank, including Mark Gonzales who attempted an early-grab, and Dustin Dollin who attempted a kickflip.

As of 2020, Milton is sponsored by Creature Skateboards, Converse, Independent Truck Company, Bronson Speed Co., OJ Wheels, Volcom, Social Skateshop, Mob, and Bum Bag.

=== Skate video parts ===
- Doceseis - Independent – 2012
- CSFU - Creature – 2013
- Creature Fiend - Creature – 2014
- Holy Stokes - Volcom – 2016
- One Star World Tour - Converse – 2016
- RV Rampage - Volcom – 2017
- Purple - Converse – 2018
- The Creature Tour video - Creature – 2018
- Elite Vol 1 - OJ Wheels - 2019
- ¡DEMOLICIÓN! – 2019
- Seize the Seconds - Converse – 2020
- Milton Martinez SOTY tour – Thrasher Magazine – 2020
- Gangreen - Creature – 2021
- Que Saguaro - Volcom – 2021
- Terminal Tourists - Volcom – 2021
- As You Wish - Converse – 2022
- Havoc - Creature – 2024
- Criaturas Del Inferno - Creature – 2024
- Absolutely Nein - Independent Trucks – 2025
- Sever - Creature – 2025
