= 2022 Xfinity 500 =

NASCAR Cup Series race

Race details
- Race 35 of 36 in the 2022 NASCAR Cup Series
- Date: October 30, 2022
- Location: Martinsville Speedway in Ridgeway, Virginia
- Course: Permanent racing facility
- Course length: .526 miles (.847 km)
- Distance: 500 laps, 263 mi (423.5 km)
- Weather: Clouded sky
- Average speed: 113.5 mph (182.7 km/h)

Pole position
Driver	Kyle Larson	Hendrick Motorsports
- Time: 19.709

Most laps led
Driver	Denny Hamlin	Joe Gibbs Racing
- Laps: 203

Winner
No. 20	Christopher Bell	Joe Gibbs Racing

Television in the United States
- Network: NBC
- Announcers: Rick Allen, Jeff Burton, Steve Letarte and Dale Earnhardt Jr.

Radio in the United States
- Radio: MRN
- Booth announcers: Alex Hayden, Jeff Striegle and Rusty Wallace
- Turn announcers: Dave Moody (Backstretch)

The 2022 Xfinity 500 was a NASCAR Cup Series race held on October 30, 2022, at Martinsville Speedway in Ridgeway, Virginia. Contested over 500 laps on the .526 mile (.847 km) short track, it was the 35th race of the 2022 NASCAR Cup Series season, the ninth race of the Playoffs, and final race of the Round of 8.

This race, won by Christopher Bell, was noted for Ross Chastain's "Hail Melon" finish, in which Chastain rode the wall in a move described as similar to those done in racing video games to secure a fourth-place finish that locked him to the Championship 4 race. Chastain's move also set an all-new track record.

== Report ==
=== Background ===
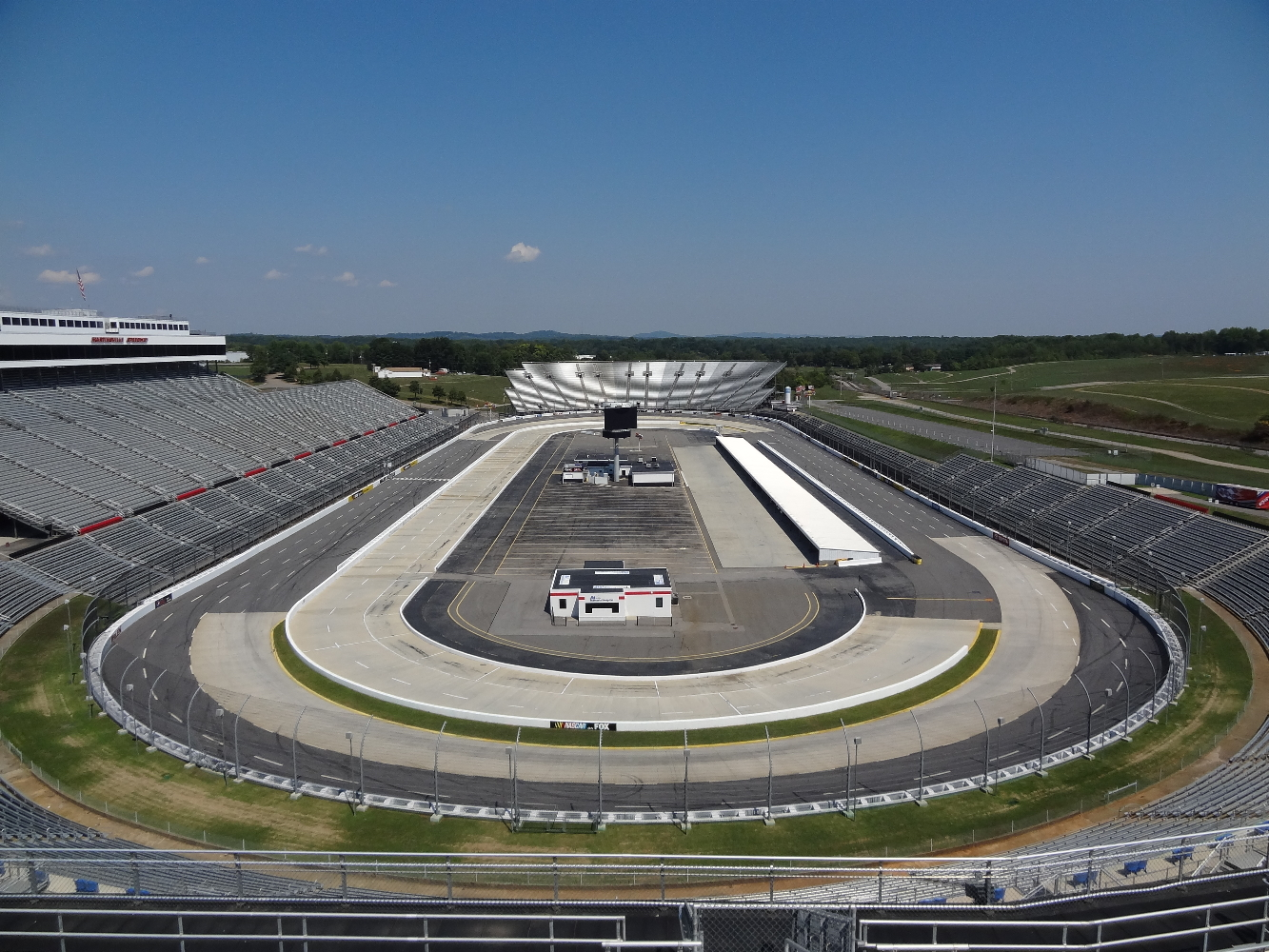
Martinsville Speedway, the track where the race was held.

Martinsville Speedway is an International Speedway Corporation-owned NASCAR stock car racing track located in Henry County, in Ridgeway, Virginia, just to the south of Martinsville. At 0.526 miles (0.847 km) in length, it is the shortest track in the NASCAR Cup Series. The track is also one of the first paved oval tracks in NASCAR, being built in 1947 by H. Clay Earles. It is also the only race track that has been on the NASCAR circuit from its beginning in 1948. Along with this, Martinsville is the only NASCAR oval track on the entire NASCAR track circuit to have asphalt surfaces on the straightaways, then concrete to cover the turns.

==== Entry list ====
- (R) denotes rookie driver.
- (i) denotes driver who is ineligible for series driver points.

No.	Driver	Team	Manufacturer
1	Ross Chastain	Trackhouse Racing Team	Chevrolet
2	Austin Cindric (R)	Team Penske	Ford
3	Austin Dillon	Richard Childress Racing	Chevrolet
4	Kevin Harvick	Stewart-Haas Racing	Ford
5	Kyle Larson	Hendrick Motorsports	Chevrolet
6	Brad Keselowski	RFK Racing	Ford
7	Corey LaJoie	Spire Motorsports	Chevrolet
8	Tyler Reddick	Richard Childress Racing	Chevrolet
9	Chase Elliott	Hendrick Motorsports	Chevrolet
10	Aric Almirola	Stewart-Haas Racing	Ford
11	Denny Hamlin	Joe Gibbs Racing	Toyota
12	Ryan Blaney	Team Penske	Ford
14	Chase Briscoe	Stewart-Haas Racing	Ford
15	J. J. Yeley (i)	Rick Ware Racing	Ford
16	A. J. Allmendinger (i)	Kaulig Racing	Chevrolet
17	Chris Buescher	RFK Racing	Ford
18	Kyle Busch	Joe Gibbs Racing	Toyota
19	Martin Truex Jr.	Joe Gibbs Racing	Toyota
20	Christopher Bell	Joe Gibbs Racing	Toyota
21	Harrison Burton (R)	Wood Brothers Racing	Ford
22	Joey Logano	Team Penske	Ford
23	Ty Gibbs (i)	23XI Racing	Toyota
24	William Byron	Hendrick Motorsports	Chevrolet
31	Justin Haley	Kaulig Racing	Chevrolet
34	Michael McDowell	Front Row Motorsports	Ford
38	Todd Gilliland (R)	Front Row Motorsports	Ford
41	Cole Custer	Stewart-Haas Racing	Ford
42	Ty Dillon	Petty GMS Motorsports	Chevrolet
43	Erik Jones	Petty GMS Motorsports	Chevrolet
45	Bubba Wallace	23XI Racing	Toyota
47	Ricky Stenhouse Jr.	JTG Daugherty Racing	Chevrolet
48	Noah Gragson (i)	Hendrick Motorsports	Chevrolet
51	Cody Ware	Rick Ware Racing	Ford
77	Landon Cassill (i)	Spire Motorsports	Chevrolet
78	B. J. McLeod (i)	Live Fast Motorsports	Ford
99	Daniel Suárez	Trackhouse Racing Team	Chevrolet
Official entry list

== Practice ==
Denny Hamlin was the fastest in the practice session with a time of 19.916 seconds and a speed of 95.079 mph (153.015 km/h).

=== Practice results ===
Pos	No.	Driver	Team	Manufacturer	Time	Speed
1	11	Denny Hamlin	Joe Gibbs Racing	Toyota	19.916	95.079
2	12	Ryan Blaney	Team Penske	Ford	19.917	95.075
3	9	Chase Elliott	Hendrick Motorsports	Chevrolet	19.949	94.922
Official practice results

== Qualifying ==
Kyle Larson scored the pole for the race with a time of 19.709 and a speed of 96.078 mph (154.623 km/h).

=== Qualifying results ===
Pos	No.	Driver	Team	Manufacturer	R1	R2
1	5	Kyle Larson	Hendrick Motorsports	Chevrolet	19.733	19.709
2	9	Chase Elliott	Hendrick Motorsports	Chevrolet	19.683	19.721
3	14	Chase Briscoe	Stewart-Haas Racing	Ford	19.659	19.721
4	12	Ryan Blaney	Team Penske	Ford	19.814	19.740
5	41	Cole Custer	Stewart-Haas Racing	Ford	19.718	19.780
6	6	Brad Keselowski	RFK Racing	Ford	19.754	19.783
7	99	Daniel Suárez	Trackhouse Racing Team	Chevrolet	19.774	19.810
8	4	Kevin Harvick	Stewart-Haas Racing	Ford	19.752	19.822
9	1	Ross Chastain	Trackhouse Racing Team	Chevrolet	19.753	19.828
10	21	Harrison Burton (R)	Wood Brothers Racing	Ford	19.742	19.933
11	11	Denny Hamlin	Joe Gibbs Racing	Toyota	19.763	—
12	22	Joey Logano	Team Penske	Ford	19.766	—
13	34	Michael McDowell	Front Row Motorsports	Ford	19.788	—
14	7	Corey LaJoie	Spire Motorsports	Chevrolet	19.825	—
15	10	Aric Almirola	Stewart-Haas Racing	Ford	19.829	—
16	3	Austin Dillon	Richard Childress Racing	Chevrolet	19.839	—
17	48	Noah Gragson (i)	Hendrick Motorsports	Chevrolet	19.845	—
18	18	Kyle Busch	Joe Gibbs Racing	Toyota	19.849	—
19	38	Todd Gilliland (R)	Front Row Motorsports	Ford	19.861	—
20	20	Christopher Bell	Joe Gibbs Racing	Toyota	19.882	—
21	16	A. J. Allmendinger (i)	Kaulig Racing	Chevrolet	19.888	—
22	17	Chris Buescher	RFK Racing	Ford	19.891	—
23	43	Erik Jones	Petty GMS Motorsports	Chevrolet	19.898	—
24	45	Bubba Wallace	23XI Racing	Toyota	19.924	—
25	24	William Byron	Hendrick Motorsports	Chevrolet	19.942	—
26	23	Ty Gibbs (i)	23XI Racing	Toyota	19.943	—
27	19	Martin Truex Jr.	Joe Gibbs Racing	Toyota	19.958	—
28	8	Tyler Reddick	Richard Childress Racing	Chevrolet	19.980	—
29	31	Justin Haley	Kaulig Racing	Chevrolet	19.987	—
30	2	Austin Cindric (R)	Team Penske	Ford	19.998	—
31	47	Ricky Stenhouse Jr.	JTG Daugherty Racing	Chevrolet	20.086	—
32	42	Ty Dillon	Petty GMS Motorsports	Chevrolet	20.103	—
33	77	Landon Cassill (i)	Spire Motorsports	Chevrolet	20.210	—
34	78	B. J. McLeod (i)	Live Fast Motorsports	Ford	20.247	—
35	15	J. J. Yeley (i)	Rick Ware Racing	Ford	20.356	—
36	51	Cody Ware	Rick Ware Racing	Ford	20.840	—
Official qualifying results

== Race ==
Heading into the finish, Ross Chastain clinched his spot into the Championship 4 by the way of a last-ditch wall-ride that has been described as a "video game-like move" in the final lap. Chastain's move also set a new Cup Series lap record on the track at 18.845 seconds. The move has been dubbed the Hail Melon by many in the sport. Christopher Bell's race victory also placed him into the championship race, with Joey Logano (who won a race in the Round of 8) and Chase Elliott also advancing.

=== Stage Results ===
Stage One Laps: 130

Pos	No	Driver	Team	Manufacturer	Points
1	11	Denny Hamlin	Joe Gibbs Racing	Toyota	10
2	9	Chase Elliott	Hendrick Motorsports	Chevrolet	9
3	41	Cole Custer	Stewart-Haas Racing	Ford	8
4	5	Kyle Larson	Hendrick Motorsports	Chevrolet	7
5	14	Chase Briscoe	Stewart-Haas Racing	Ford	6
6	20	Christopher Bell	Joe Gibbs Racing	Toyota	5
7	12	Ryan Blaney	Team Penske	Ford	4
8	1	Ross Chastain	Trackhouse Racing Team	Chevrolet	3
9	99	Daniel Suárez	Trackhouse Racing Team	Chevrolet	2
10	10	Aric Almirola	Stewart-Haas Racing	Ford	1
Official stage one results

Stage Two Laps: 130

Pos	No	Driver	Team	Manufacturer	Points
1	11	Denny Hamlin	Joe Gibbs Racing	Toyota	10
2	9	Chase Elliott	Hendrick Motorsports	Chevrolet	9
3	5	Kyle Larson	Hendrick Motorsports	Chevrolet	8
4	41	Cole Custer	Stewart-Haas Racing	Ford	7
5	20	Christopher Bell	Joe Gibbs Racing	Toyota	6
6	12	Ryan Blaney	Team Penske	Ford	5
7	22	Joey Logano	Team Penske	Ford	4
8	1	Ross Chastain	Trackhouse Racing Team	Chevrolet	3
9	99	Daniel Suárez	Trackhouse Racing Team	Chevrolet	2
10	45	Bubba Wallace	23XI Racing	Toyota	1
Official stage two results

=== Final Stage Results ===
Stage Three Laps: 240

Pos	Grid	No	Driver	Team	Manufacturer	Laps	Points
1	20	20	Christopher Bell	Joe Gibbs Racing	Toyota	500	51
2	1	5	Kyle Larson	Hendrick Motorsports	Chevrolet	500	50
3	4	12	Ryan Blaney	Team Penske	Ford	500	43
4	9	1	Ross Chastain	Trackhouse Racing Team	Chevrolet	500	39
5	11	11	Denny Hamlin	Joe Gibbs Racing	Toyota	500	52
6	12	22	Joey Logano	Team Penske	Ford	500	35
7	25	24	William Byron	Hendrick Motorsports	Chevrolet	500	30
8	24	45	Bubba Wallace	23XI Racing	Toyota	500	30
9	3	14	Chase Briscoe	Stewart-Haas Racing	Ford	500	34
10	2	9	Chase Elliott	Hendrick Motorsports	Chevrolet	500	45
11	10	21	Harrison Burton (R)	Wood Brothers Racing	Ford	500	26
12	7	99	Daniel Suárez	Trackhouse Racing Team	Chevrolet	500	29
13	19	38	Todd Gilliland (R)	Front Row Motorsports	Ford	500	24
14	5	41	Cole Custer	Stewart-Haas Racing	Ford	500	38
15	15	10	Aric Almirola	Stewart-Haas Racing	Ford	500	23
16	8	4	Kevin Harvick	Stewart-Haas Racing	Ford	500	21
17	13	34	Michael McDowell	Front Row Motorsports	Ford	500	20
18	23	43	Erik Jones	Petty GMS Motorsports	Chevrolet	498	19
19	26	23	Ty Gibbs (i)	23XI Racing	Toyota	498	0
20	27	19	Martin Truex Jr.	Joe Gibbs Racing	Toyota	498	17
21	14	7	Corey LaJoie	Spire Motorsports	Chevrolet	498	16
22	31	47	Ricky Stenhouse Jr.	JTG Daugherty Racing	Chevrolet	498	15
23	21	16	A. J. Allmendinger (i)	Kaulig Racing	Chevrolet	498	0
24	22	17	Chris Buescher	RFK Racing	Ford	497	13
25	17	48	Noah Gragson (i)	Hendrick Motorsports	Chevrolet	497	0
26	30	2	Austin Cindric (R)	Team Penske	Ford	497	11
27	29	31	Justin Haley	Kaulig Racing	Chevrolet	497	10
28	36	51	Cody Ware	Rick Ware Racing	Ford	495	9
29	18	18	Kyle Busch	Joe Gibbs Racing	Toyota	494	8
30	35	15	J. J. Yeley (i)	Rick Ware Racing	Ford	488	0
31	32	42	Ty Dillon	Petty GMS Motorsports	Chevrolet	466	6
32	33	77	Landon Cassill (i)	Spire Motorsports	Chevrolet	460	0
33	16	3	Austin Dillon	Richard Childress Racing	Chevrolet	316	4
34	34	78	B. J. McLeod (i)	Live Fast Motorsports	Ford	225	0
35	28	8	Tyler Reddick	Richard Childress Racing	Chevrolet	188	2
DSQ	6	6	Brad Keselowski (Note: Keselowski originally finished fourth, but was disqualified due to his car being found to be underweight in post-race inspection.)	RFK Racing	Ford	500	1
Official race results

=== Race statistics ===
- Lead changes: 8 among 5 different drivers
- Cautions/Laps: 6 for 53
- Red flags: 0
- Time of race: 3 hours, 24 minutes and 18 seconds
- Average speed: 77.239 miles per hour (124.304 km/h)

== Media ==
=== Television ===
NBC Sports covered the race on the television side. Rick Allen, 1997 race winner Jeff Burton, Steve Letarte and 2014 race winner Dale Earnhardt Jr. called the race from the broadcast booth. Dave Burns, Parker Kligerman, Marty Snider and Dillon Welch handled the pit road duties from pit lane.

NBC
Booth announcers	Pit reporters
Lap-by-lap: Rick Allen; Color-commentator: Jeff Burton; Color-commentator: Steve Letarte; Color-commentator: Dale Earnhardt Jr.	Dave Burns; Parker Kligerman; Marty Snider; Dillon Welch

=== Radio ===
MRN covered the radio call for the race, which was also simulcast on Sirius XM NASCAR Radio. Alex Hayden, Jeff Striegle and 7 time Martinsville winner Rusty Wallace had the call for MRN when the field raced down the front straightaway. Dave Moody covered the action for MRN when the field raced down the backstraightway into turn 3. Steve Post, Winston Kelley, Brienne Pedigo and Kim Coon covered the action for MRN from pit lane.

MRN
Booth announcers	Turn announcers	Pit reporters
Lead announcer: Alex Hayden; Announcer: Jeff Striegle; Announcer: Rusty Wallace	Backstretch: Dave Moody	Steve Post; Winston Kelley; Brienne Pedigo; Kim Coon

== Standings after the race ==
Drivers' Championship standings

	Pos	Driver	Points
	1	Joey Logano	5,000
5	2	Christopher Bell	5,000 (–0)
1	3	Ross Chastain	5,000 (–0)
1	4	Chase Elliott	5,000 (–0)
	5	Denny Hamlin	2,350 (–2,650)
2	6	William Byron	2,339 (–2,661)
2	7	Kyle Larson	2,316 (–2,684)
2	8	Ryan Blaney	2,300 (–2,700)
1	9	Daniel Suárez	2,259 (–2,741)
2	10	Chase Briscoe	2,244 (–2,756)
	11	Austin Dillon	2,204 (–2,796)
1	12	Austin Cindric	2,198 (–2,802)
1	13	Tyler Reddick	2,197 (–2,803)
	14	Kyle Busch	2,194 (–2,806)
	15	Alex Bowman	2,104 (–2,896)
	16	Kevin Harvick	2,085 (–2,915)
Official driver's standings

Manufacturers' Championship standings

Pos	Manufacturer	Points
1	Chevrolet	1,290
2	Ford	1,210 (–80)
3	Toyota	1,158 (–132)

- Note: Only the first 16 positions are included for the driver standings.

== Notes ==
Previous race: 2022 Dixie Vodka 400	NASCAR Cup Series; 2022 season	Next race: 2022 NASCAR Cup Series Championship Race
