= Lance Dawes =

American skateboarder, magazine editor, and photographer

- Born: September 27, 1970 (age 55); Silver Spring, MD.
- Education: San Francisco State University
- Occupations: Photographer, magazine editor
- Website: http://www.lancedawesphoto.com/

Lance Dawes is an American skateboarder, photographer, writer, studio director, co-founder and former editor-in-chief of Slap Magazine.

== Skateboarding and photography ==
Dawes was raised in Washington DC., where he grew up in the DC punk scene of the 1980s. In his late teens, Dawes became a sponsored skateboarder for Dogtown, Vans and Independent Trucks. He moved to San Francisco to study film at the University of San Francisco. While in school, Dawes worked as a darkroom tech and stat operator at Thrasher Magazine from October 1990 to January 1992. Dawes documented the San Francisco skate scene of the early 1990s.

=== Slap Magazine ===
Lance Dawes is the co-founder and original editor of SLAP. Dawes founded Slap with High Speed Productions in January 1992. In 1999, after running the magazine for seven years, Lance Dawes moved down to Los Angeles and left his position as editor-in-chief. Mark Whiteley was named editor-in-chief after Dawes. Dawes continued to be a contributing editor and photographer for both Slap and Thrasher until June 2009.

Dawes' photography has appeared in a range of campaigns and publications, from ESPN, The Washington Post, The Associated Press, Getty Images, Warner Music, Atlantic Records, Panasonic, Vans, Nike, Juxtapoz magazine, Flywheels, and Skateboarder Magazine.
