= Louie Lopez =

Skateboarder

Louie Lopez (born November 26, 1994) is an American skateboarder from Los Angeles, California. He is of Mexican and Guatemalan descent.

== Skateboarding career ==
Lopez first became sponsored by Flip Skateboards at the age of seven. In 2006, Lopez made his video debut in Flip’s Feast Tours. In 2007, Lopez competed in the Tampa Am for the first time. Louie’s combination of technical ledge skills and ability to boost huge in transition made him an immediate threat on the contest circuit. Lopez put down solid performances in the Damn Am series on a board that looked bigger than he did, but showed the world his skating talent was even larger. Since turning pro for Flip in 2013, Louie has been a regular on the Dew Tour, standing on the podium five times and taking second in both Street and Street Style at the Chicago stops in 2015, followed second in Street at the LA stop. His home in Hawthorne, California has a backyard bowl, something he always dreamed of having.

=== Skate Video parts ===
- As You Wish – Converse Cons – 2022
- Louie, Again & Again – FA World Entertainment – 2022
- Honor Roll – Spitfire – 2022
- Days of Grace – FA World Entertainment – 2021
- Worldly Goods – Volcom Skate – 2021
- Lola – Converse Cons – 2020
- The Louie Lopez II – FA World Entertainment – 2020
- Seize the Seconds – Converse Cons – 2020
- The Louie Lopez – FA World Entertainment – 2020
- GODSPEED – Illegal Civ – 2020
- Keep the Fire Burning – Spitfire – 2019
- Purple – Converse – 2018
- West End – Volcom – 2017
- Spitfire – Spitfire – 2017
- RV Rampage – Volcom – 2017
- One Star World Tour – Converse – 2016
- Holy Smokes – Volcom – 2016
- True to this – Volcom – 2016
- Goosenectar – Independent – 2014
- Flip 3 – Flip – 2014
- Illegal Civilization 2 – Illegal Civ – 2014
- Weight of the World – Flip – 2012
- Extremely Sorry – Flip – 2009
- United By Fate - Globe – 2007

== Sponsors ==
Louie Lopez's sponsors include: Converse, FA, Noah, Independent Trucks, Spitfire Wheels, Hardies Hardware, and Miles Griptape.
