= Eric Swenson =

American skateboard designer

Eric Leon Swenson (August 4, 1946 – June 20, 2011) was an American skateboard designer and magazine publisher.

Born in San Francisco, Swenson was the chief skateboard designer for Independent Truck Company, which he co-founded with skateboard entrepreneur Fausto Vitello in 1978. In 1981, he co-founded Thrasher magazine with Vitello. Thrasher is credited with helping to revitalize the popularity of skateboarding during the last two decades of the 20th century. He also played an instrumental role in helping to elevate skateboarding from a hobby into an internationally recognized sport. He was a fan of punk and hard rock, and befriended a number of musicians. Swenson's hobbies included playing guitar and repairing motorcycles and other vehicles, although he did not skateboard himself.

Swenson shot himself in front of a San Francisco police station on June 20, 2011, reportedly to spare his family from discovering his body. He was 64. According to his wife, he had suffered from joint problems for the past several years, aggravated by a leg injury suffered in a 1972 motorcycle accident; in the months prior to his death, the pain was becoming unbearable to him.
