= Jim Thiebaud =

American skateboarder

Jim Thiebaud is an American skateboarder.

== Biography ==
Thiebaud grew up in the San Francisco Bay Area and during the 1980s was part of the San Francisco skate scene. Thiebaud not only participated in skateboarding during the early 1980s, but he also led, mentored, and encouraged a group of younger skateboarders including Rick Patterson, Mark Warren and Ben Fuller at Albany High School during 1982–1983 while attending high school, teaching and demonstrating tricks such as wallrides, hippie jumps over chairs, ollies down stairsets, and boardslides down handrails in the Albany High courtyard. Groups would gather around to learn from Thiebaud and watch him demonstrate his growing craft.

Jim rode as an amateur for Powell-Peralta, then turned pro for Santa Monica Airlines before he and former Powell-Peralta teammate Tommy Guerrero co-founded Real Skateboards in 1991. He also later founded Adeline Records in the late 1990s.

Thiebaud is the Vice President at Deluxe Distribution, Thiebaud was inspirational in the late 2000s movement of the skateboarding industry to look for and create worthwhile charities and causes within skateboarding that give back, support those in need, and perpetuate the idea of skateboarders taking care of their own.

Thiebaud authored the books Do The Distance and Loose Change.

Thiebaud currently lives in the San Francisco Bay Area.

== Video appearances ==
- 1987: The Search For Animal Chin (Powell-Peralta)
- 1988: Public Domain (Powell-Peralta)
- 1989: Speed Freaks (Santa Cruz Speed Wheels)
- 1990: A Reason For Living (Santa Cruz Skateboards)
- 1993: The Real Video (Real Skateboards)
- 1996: Non-Fiction (Real Skateboards)
- 1999: Kicked Out Of Everywhere (Real Skateboards)

== Filmography ==
- 1988 976-EVIL as "Rags"
