= Mark Suciu =

American skateboarder (born 1992)

Personal information
- Full name: Mark Suciu
- Nationality: American
- Born: August 3, 1992 (age 33) Saratoga, California, U.S.
- Education: Temple University, The New School

Sport
- Country: United States
- Sport: Skateboarding

Mark Suciu (pronounced Soo-Choo) (Born August 3, 1992) is an American professional skateboarder from Saratoga, California, based out of New York City. In 2021, Suciu was named Thrasher's Skater of the Year.

== Early life and education ==
Mark Suciu was born on August 3, 1992, and grew up less than an hour south from San Francisco in Saratoga, California. Suciu has a brother and their father is from Romania. His father attended the University of California, Berkeley, where he graduated with a Ph.D. in Engineering. After graduating high school, Suciu was skating full time until he sustained an ankle injury. After a period of time, Suciu felt that he was burned out from skateboarding and wanted to explore other facets of life. Suciu decided to attend Temple University where he studied Creative Writing and Literature. After two years of living in Philadelphia, Suciu moved to New York City to attend The New School.

== Skateboarding career ==
Suciu started skateboarding when he was six years old. He found inspiration through watching the X Games on TV, seeing local kids skating, and from his cousin who lives in Doylestown, Pennsylvania. Every summer, Suciu would visit his cousin in Pennsylvania where he was able to skate frequently in Philadelphia and Love Park. His first real skateboard was a Powell Peralta Blue & Golden Dragon Steve Caballero deck. Suciu used to compete in the eS Game of Skate contests frequently.

== Video appearances ==
- 2005: Mijos (Getofab #6)
- 2006: Future $ellout$ (Getofab #7)
- 2007: Mortigi Tempo
- 2009: Party Banks – Fishbanks Skateshop
- 2010: Double Rock – Thrasher
- 2010: Origin – Habitat
- 2011: Hell on Wheels – Thrasher
- 2012: Cityscape
- 2012: Sabotage3
- 2012: Cross Continental – Atlas/Habitat
- 2013: Philadelphia with Mark Suciu – Adidas
- 2013: Search The Horizon – Habitat
- 2013: The Philadelphia Experiment – Caste Quality
- 2014: Good Times Are Coming – sml. Wheels
- 2015: Sabotage4
- 2016: Away Days – Adidas
- 2017: Broadway Bullet – Adidas
- 2018: Suciu ADV II part – Adidas
- 2019: Verso
- 2019: Connector Line – Habitat
- 2021: Blue Dog – Adidas
- 2021: Curve – Habitat
- 2021: Spitfire – Spitfire
- 2021: "Flora" Episode III – Thrasher
- 2021: Ground Glass – Jenkem Magazine

== Sponsors ==
As of 2021, Suciu rides for Habitat Skateboards, and has numerous other sponsors including Adidas Footwear, Spitfire Wheels, Thunder Trucks, RVCA Clothing, Jessup Griptape, and Atlas Skateshop.
