= Anthony Van Engelen =

American professional skateboarder (born 1978)

Anthony Van Engelen (born November 20, 1978) is an American professional skateboarder whose stance is Regular. In the skateboarding scene he is well known by the name “AVE”, which is an acronym of his full name.

== Early life ==
Van Engelen was born in San Diego, California, United States (US).

== Professional skateboarding ==
Van Engelen's first sponsor was Volcom, but his first board sponsor was Channel One Skateboards. He was then sponsored by 23 Skateboards.

=== Alien Workshop ===
Van Engelen attained professional status with Alien Workshop skateboards as his deck sponsor in 1999 at the age of 21. His first full video part was in 411VM. He then shared a part with Jason Dill in Transworld's video Feedback in 1999, and then had a full part in 2000 for Alien Workshop's Photosynthesis to the song Search and Destroy by Iggy Pop and The Stooges. In 2003 he released a part for The DC Video by DC Shoes. In July 2009 his part in Alien Workshop's video Mind Field was named “Best Video Part” by Transworld Magazine, while Mind Field was also awarded as “Best Video” and Alien Workshop as “Best Team”. In 2013, it was announced that Van Engelen and his fellow team rider Jason Dill had left Alien Workshop to start their own skateboard company.

=== Vans ===
Van Engelen was sponsored by DC Shoes, but in December 2005 he quit that team to join Vans as his shoe sponsor. In 2015 he appeared in Vans’ first full-length skate video Propeller, where he had the ending part.

=== Fucking Awesome ===
On May 1, 2013, he left Alien Workshop, along with fellow team rider Jason Dill, to start their own skateboard company named Fucking Awesome.

=== SOTY 2015 ===
In 2015 his acclaimed part in Vans’ video Propeller made Van Engelen win Thrasher’s annual “Skater of the Year” award.

== Sponsors ==
His sponsors include Vans, Fucking Awesome, Independent Trucks, and Spitfire.
