= Natas Kaupas =

American skateboarder

- Born: March 23, 1969 (age 57); Santa Monica, California, U.S.
- Occupation: Skateboarder

Natas Kaupas (born March 23, 1969) is an American former professional skateboarder. He grew up in South Santa Monica, California, in the area known as Dogtown, and is of Lithuanian descent. Often referred to as one of the first true professional street skateboarders (alongside Mark Gonzales), Kaupas is also known for co-founding the clothing brand FUCT.

== Career ==
=== Early 1980s ===
Kaupas began skating during his childhood years. In 1983 Kaupas won a local Santa Monica surfing contest and received a Santa Monica Airlines (SMA) skateboard as a first place prize. SMA was operated out of the back of a surfshop owned by Skip Engblom. Kaupas approached Engblom about becoming a member of his skate team, which did not exist. However, Engblom was impressed with Kaupas's skating ability and offered to sponsor him.

Kaupas attended Santa Monica High School in the 1980s.

Kaupas by his own admission remained clueless and uninterested in the mainstream skateboard subculture. He honed his street skateboarding skills by utilizing his surroundings, preferring not to ride ramps or parks. By the mid-1980s, Kaupas had discovered riding walls where he would throw his skateboard up against a wall and ride off it. He then perfected this trick by riding up the side of walls without using his hands. In 1984 Thrasher Magazine photographer and skating commentator Craig Stecyk took a photo of Kaupas riding off a wall which featured on the cover of Thrasher Magazine's September 1984 issue. With this cover photo, Kaupas began to receive more magazine coverage and recognition from professional skaters. Also in 1984, SMA released Kaupas's first pro-model skateboard, which featured a panther image drawn by Santa Monica artist Kevin Ancell. At this point, Kaupas was regularly skating with such notables as Mark Gonzales, Julien Stranger and Jim Thiebaud and pioneering what would be known as 'street skating'. Kaupas and Gonzales innovated many new skateboarding tricks and ideas, the first of which was transferring Rodney Mullen's kickflip from freestyle skating to street skating.

=== Widespread recognition ===
In 1986, demand for SMA skateboards had grown at an increasing rate which they struggled to meet. At 16, Kaupas impressed Engblom when he made a manufacturing and distribution arrangement with the much larger company, Santa Cruz Skateboards. It is claimed by some in the skateboarding community that Kaupas pioneered rail slide manoeuvres in the late 1980s while at a Pro-Am skate contest held in Oceanside, California. Kaupas stunned the crowd by attempting a board slide down a handrail. Although his attempt was unsuccessful, skating history was made. This was followed up when Kaupas and Gonzales performed what is considered the first legitimate rail slide and later with 50-50 grinds.

In 1987, Kaupas had his debut role in the Santa Cruz skateboarding video Wheels of Fire. In the film, Kaupas displayed an ability to ollie which far surpassed anyone else, and his part is considered to have paved the way for the new direction of skateboarding. This role gave Kaupas a sudden jolt of notoriety, however attention was soon turned to the spelling of his first name, as 'Natas' spelled backwards is 'Satan'. Kaupas attempted to explain his name as being the masculine version of the Lithuanian female name 'Natalija'. Despite this however, many schools and shops instituted a ban on any merchandise bearing the name 'Natas'.

Later in 1987, Kaupas had become such a well-known figure that shoe company Etnies offered him his own pro model shoe, an entirely new concept in the skating world. The marketing and design of the shoe was influenced by Kaupas. He was able to use his artistic talents, which he later incorporated in SMA skateboard designs.

In 1989, Santa Cruz released a follow-up video to Wheels of Fire entitled Streets on Fire, in which Kaupas played a greater role. Kaupas' stand-out performance in the film was a new trick where he ollied up onto a fire hydrant and performed a 720 degree spin on top of it. The trick would be known as the 'Natas spin' and has also been adapted to the sport of snowboarding. The 'Natas Spin' was also incorporated into the Tony Hawk's video game series.

Kaupas along with fellow skater Jim Thiebaud, who was now skating for SMA, began a tour across America driving used Cadillacs. During the tour, the duo discovered many unknown but talented skaters who would later skate for SMA. Upon their return in 1990, skateboarding's hype had died with a slowing US economy.

In 2005, Kaupas received the Legend Award at the seventh annual Transworld Skateboarding Awards.

== Other ventures ==
In 1991 fellow pro skater Steve Rocco, who founded World Industries skateboards, approached Kaupas about starting his own line of skateboards. Kaupas left SMA and began 101 Skateboards. The company would become an outlet for Kaupas to employ his graphic and artistic talents. By 1992, 101 had become a major brand, however a broken ankle meant Kaupas' skating career was halted. While convalescing, Kaupas explored his artistic talents more and began to use computer graphics programs. He was soon asked to assist with the first issue of the Big Brother skateboarding magazine, which was also owned by World Industries. As World Industries and 101 Skateboards became more successful, scooping up many well-established pro skaters and new emerging amateurs, Kaupas lost interest. Kaupas received a call from Larry Flynt Publications who were interested in launching a new magazine entitled Rage and needed an art director. Kaupas left shortly afterwards however, again losing interest after a change in tone of the magazine.

In 1998 Kaupas along with longtime friend Mark Oblow formed Vita Shoes, which was short lived. Kaupas then found work in design and art with clothing companies Quiksilver and Element Skateboards. Both companies also sponsored him for their skateboarding team. Quiksilver soon promoted Kaupas to the role of graphic director and then vice president of marketing. In 2004, Natas started a new board company, Designarium under the manufacturing and distribution of NHS. Natas' art background led him to focus Designarium on artists rather than pro skaters. He has commissioned artists to interpret his original Santa Monica Airlines Panther graphic into their own vision. Each board is produced in limited edition runs.

== Filmography ==
Year	Film	Sponsor	Notes
1986	NSA '86, Volume 4	Unreel Productions	Featured skater
1987	The Search For Animal Chin	Powell Peralta	
1987	On the Prowl	NSI Video	Featured skater
1987	Sacto Street/Ramp Contests	NSI Video	
1988	Wheels of Fire	Santa Cruz	Featured skater
1988	Street Skating with Rob and Natas	(None)	Featured skater / instructional street skating video
1988	Sick Boys	Mack Dawg Productions	
1988	Savannah Slamma	Thrasher Magazine	Featured skater
1989	Tales from the Street	Mack Dawg Productions	Featured skater
1989	Streets on Fire	Santa Cruz	Featured skater / first video to feature "Natas Spin"
1989	Speed Freaks	Santa Cruz	Featured skater
1989	Savannah Slamma III	NSI Video	Featured skater
1989	Goin' Off	T.R. Productions	Featured skater
1990	A Reason for Living	Santa Cruz	Featured skater
1991	Quiet Storm Volume 1	Frontline Video	Documentary on skateboarding in San Diego
1996	Shit	Big Brother	Compilation video from Big Brother magazine

== Video games ==
- Kaupas is a secret playable character in the 2004 video game Tony Hawk's Underground 2.
