= Wallride =

Skateboard trick

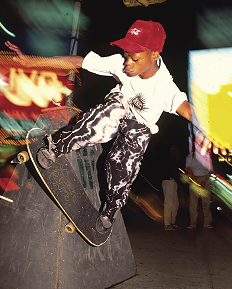
Harold Hunter performing a wallride in New York City

A wallride or wall ride is a maneuver in skateboarding in which a rider positions their skateboard parallel to a wall, putting the wheels on the side of the wall as they ride along it. The trick is noted for its particular grace.

== History ==
=== 1970s (early innovators) ===
The exact originator of the wallride is unknown but it's believed to have been invented in the mid-1970s. The invention of the backside wallride is credited to Rodney Mullen in 1979.

==== Tom "Wally" Inouye ====
Tom Inouye, best known for his signature moves, "wall rides" and "backside airs," started Inouye's Pool Service back in the '70s, and was one of the first pool skaters. "In 1976 we were riding empty pools," said Inouye. "No one knew what all there was to do, so we were having a good time and seeing how far we could push it." "We were all trying to go up onto the wall. I guess I was the only one who did it," Inouye said. "It became a trick called a 'wall ride' and the name 'Wally' has stuck with me ever since."

=== 1980s (popularization) ===
By the mid-80s, skaters such as Natas Kaupas and the Gonz exposed the rest of the skate community to wallrides. Kaupas had learned to ride walls where he would throw his skateboard up against a wall and ride off it. He then perfected this trick by riding up the side of walls without using his hands. In 1984, Thrasher photographer and skating commentator Craig Stecyk took a photo of Kaupas riding off a wall which featured on the cover of Thrasher's September 1984 issue. In the 1989 Santa Cruz Streets on Fire video, Natas Kaupas lands a frontside wallride at the beginning of his part.

=== 1990s (second wave) ===
In the 1990 Speed Wheels video, "Risk it!", Tim Jackson skates Venice beach with unique wallride manoeuvres. After a lull in popularity, Rick Howard revived the wallride in 1993 at the end of his part in the Girl/Chocolate Goldfish video. The popularity of wallrides grew in the mid-to-late 90s, with a group of Philadelphia-based skaters bringing the trick to the unique architecture of their city. From Rick Oyola, to Matt Reason, to Serge Trudnowski, to Fred Gall, this group of skaters influenced Donny Barley who was in turn influencing Jamie Thomas. The popularity of wallrides died down again in the late 90s.

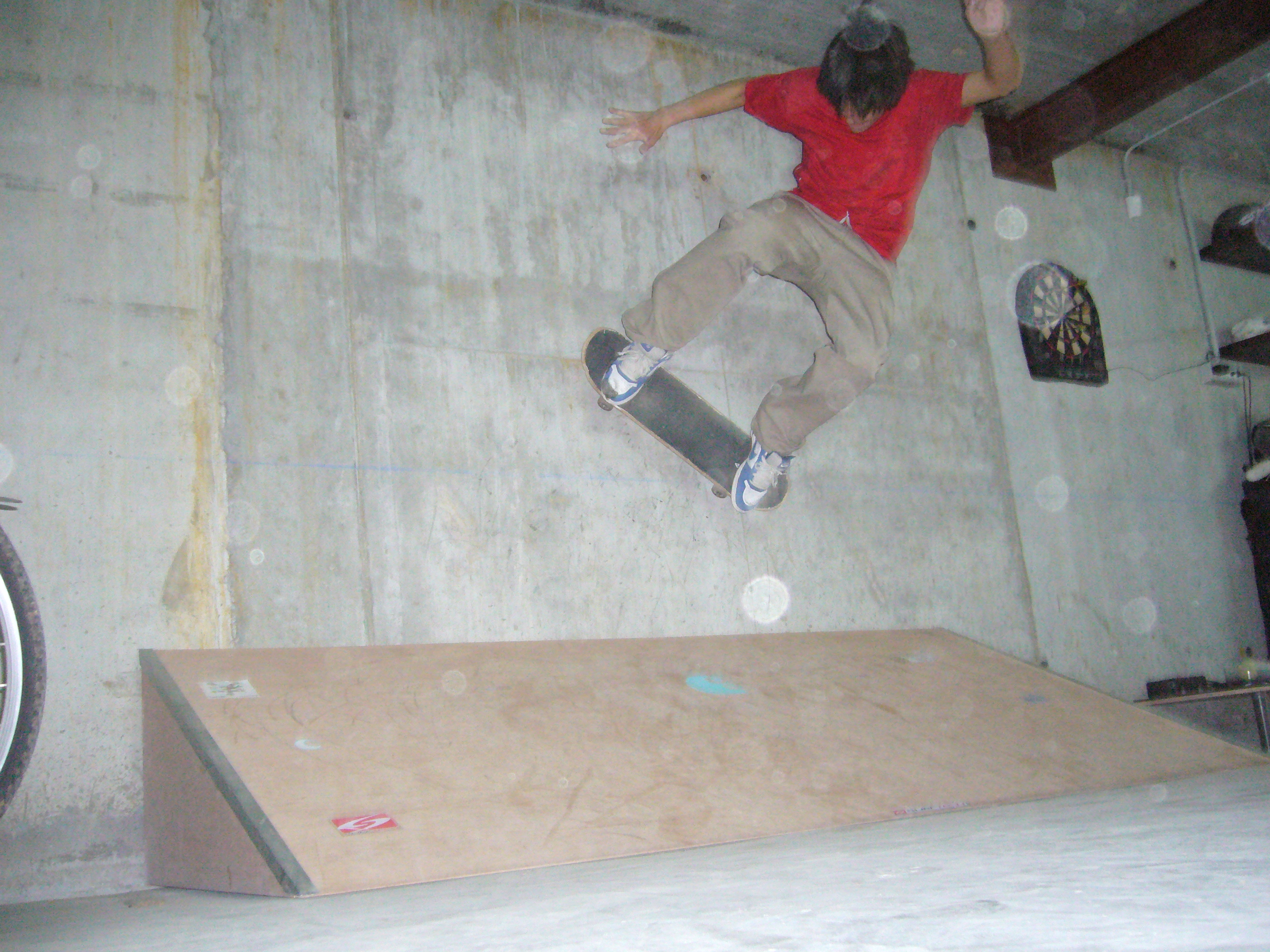
A photograph of a skater performing a wallride

=== 2000s–2010s ===
On August 25, 2004, Brad Edwards and Aaron Murray set the Guinness World Record for highest wallride on a skateboard. Skating at the Juice Magazine - USSA WSA - The Board Gallery - Hollywood Skate Jam taking place in Hollywood, California, Edwards and Murray both reached a height of 7 feet 6 inches on the wall.

Starting in the mid 2000s, wallrides and wallies experienced a renaissance.

Notable wallrides from 2000s–2010s:

Skater	Year	Video Part
Jason Adams	2006	Enjoi - ‘Bag Of Suck’
Danny Gonzales	2006	Transworld - ‘A Time to Shine’
Silas Baxter-Neal	2007	Habitat - Inhabitants
John Motta	2008	A Happy Medium
Wes Kremer	2009	DC Shoes - Skateboarding is Forever
Jake Johnson	2009	Alien Workshop - Mind Field
Lee Yankou	2012	Osiris - ‘Never Gets Old’
Jesse Alba	2012	Cosmic Vomit 2
Ryan Reyes	2013	Creature Skateboards - ‘CFSU’
Sylvain Tognelli	2013	Lakai - Kingpin Interview
Niels Bennett	2017	Venture - Awake

== Beyond skateboarding ==
The term wallride is now used in situations beyond skateboarding, coming to mean the act of traveling across any vertical surface. Wallrides exist in mountain biking, BMXing, skiing, rollerblading, and stock car racing, as well as in video games.
