= Jason Dill =

American skateboarder and company owner

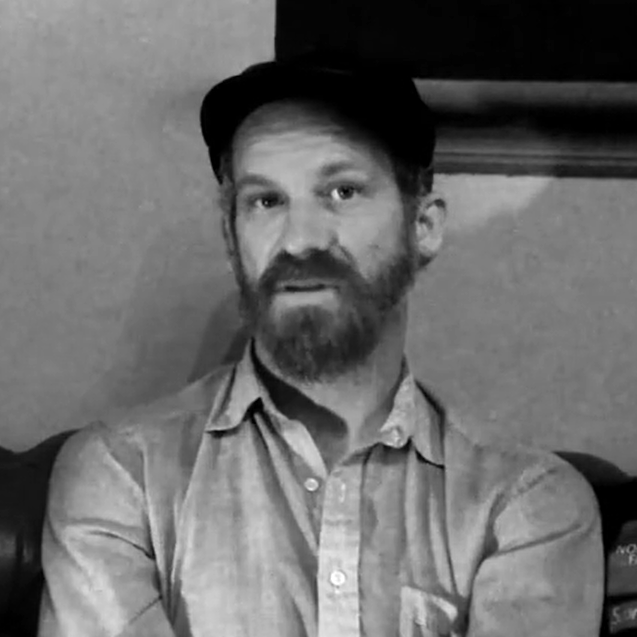
- Dill in 2014

Personal information
- Born: November 21, 1976 (age 49) Huntington Beach, California, U.S.
- Occupation(s): Skateboarder, photographer, co-founder of Fucking Awesome
- Employer: Alien Workshop (1998–2013)
- Spouse: Michelle de Swarte (m. 2009; div. 2020)

Sport
- Turned pro: 1993

Jason Dill (born November 21, 1976) is an American professional skateboarder, photographer, and co-founder of Fucking Awesome—an American skate company.

== Early life ==
Dill was born in Huntington Beach, California, United States. When he was eight years old, his father went to jail for selling cocaine. At the same age, he met future professional skater Ed Templeton who was then 13 years old. Dill described Templeton as having "changed his life."

Dill, whose family was from Greater Pittsburgh, moved around a lot when he was younger. He lived in 22 different homes by the time he was 17 years old and moved out of his family home. He was sent to a continuation high school but dropped out to pursue a skateboarding career.

== Professional skateboarding ==
Dill received his first sponsorship when he was 12 before being recruited by Natas Kaupas to ride for a division of World Industries. In 1998, he joined Alien Workshop where he spent 15 years on the pro team. He held the final spot on the influential Photosynthesis video and also appeared in the later Mind Field video.

Jason Dill left Alien Workshop in 2013.

In 2014, Dill founded the skateboard company Fucking Awesome, alongside fellow professional skater Anthony Van Engelen.

Dill has been featured in Electronic Arts (EA) Skate video game series.

== Photography ==
In 2022, Dill released the photo book Prince Street: Photos from Africa, People Remembered, Places Forgotten containing a selection of 35mm photographs spanning over 20 years from his archive.

== Personal life ==
Dill married English model and comedian Michelle de Swarte in 2009; he filed for divorce in 2020. Dill is a friend of Jack Osbourne and appeared in multiple episodes of the reality television series, The Osbournes.
