= Tyshawn Jones =

American skateboarder (born 1990)

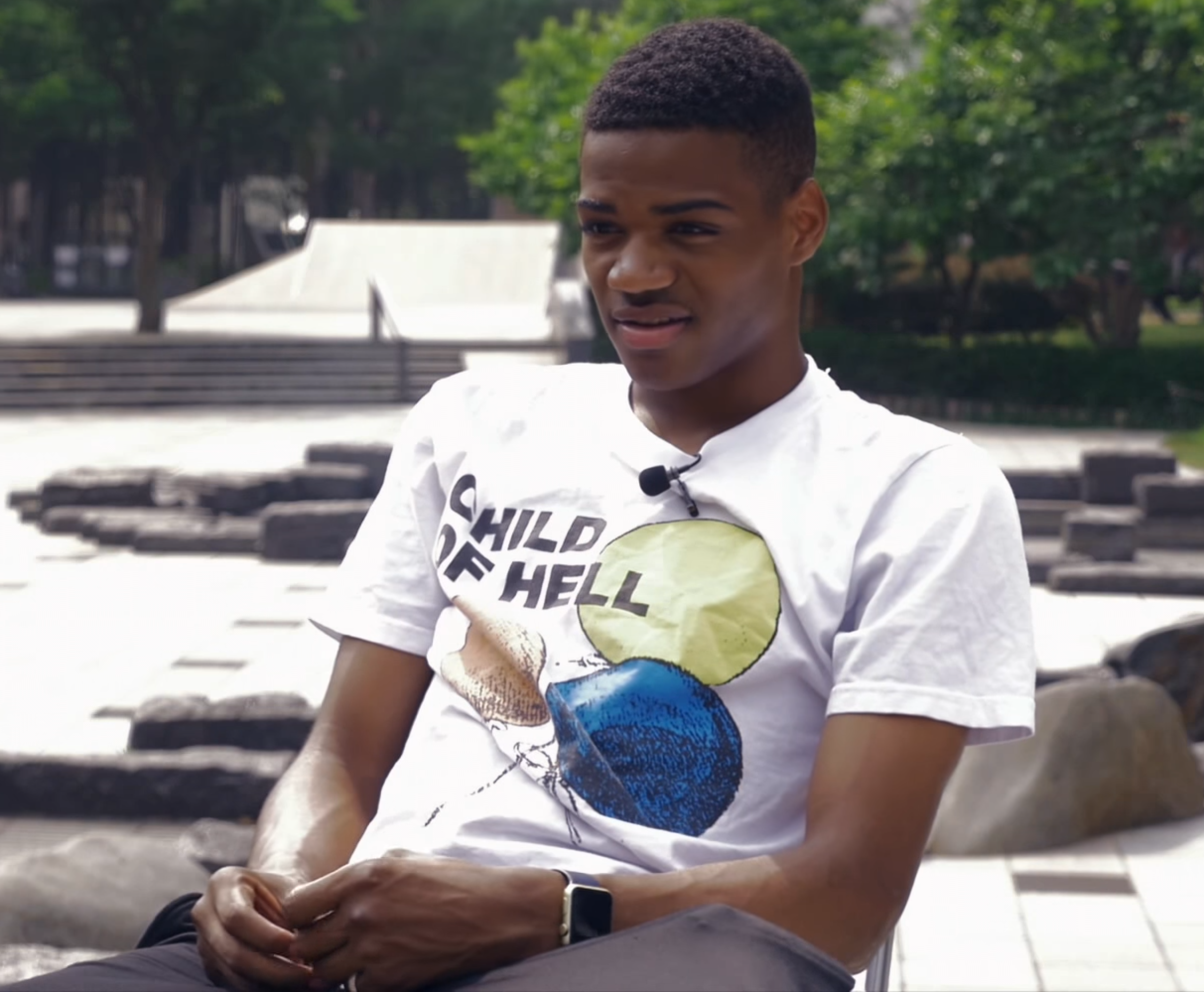
- Jones in 2016

Personal information
- Full name: Tyshawn Jones
- Born: December 24, 1998 (age 27) New York City, U.S.
- Occupation: Skateboarder
- Years active: 2007–present
- Height: 6 ft (183 cm)

Sport
- Country: United States
- Sport: Skateboarding
- Turned pro: 2011

Tyshawn Jones (born December 24, 1998) is an American professional skateboarder, from New York. He is a two time Thrasher Skater of the Year winner (2018 and 2022).

== Early life ==
Born in Manhattan, New York Jones grew up splitting his childhood between New Jersey and The Bronx, New York City. He also struggled with behaving at school, so he had to attend Brownstone School in Saddle Brook through an IEP. After playing the video game Skate with his brother and uncle at the age of 10, Jones was introduced to skateboarding and purchased his first skateboard from Target. Although Jones' older brother, Brian, eventually quit skateboarding, Tyshawn remained persistent without letting failures discourage him. After moving back to the Bronx from New Jersey, Jones focused on skating more due to a lack of friends. Encountering skaters that were better gave Jones a competitive drive which pushed Jones to become better. Jones watched skate footage growing up:

I used to go home from school and watch Andrew Reynolds’ Baker 3 part. I would just rewind his frontside flip over the Hollywood 16 rail over and over and over. Br[y]an Herman, Antwuan Dixon… I’ve never even seen [Baker 3] all the way through, I’d just watch the parts.

== Professional skateboarding career ==
After being exposed to the idea of sponsorship Jones worked on getting clips of himself skating in New York City, he saw this as an opportunity to cut cost of skateboarding equipment and wasn't so concerned about exposure. Initially Jones was under a flow sponsorship for Toy Machine. Jones first met Jason Dill (founder and CEO of Fucking Awesome) in 2011 in New York City. Dill was impressed by Jones' skating ability which evolved into Jones getting sponsored and going pro under Fucking Awesome. Jones' ability and style caught the eye of Supreme, which lead him to appear in several clips for the brand and eventually the store's 2014 video, cherry by Bill Strobeck. Jones' passion and post-trick-hype punctuated his unique style. Following the cherry video, Jones co-founded his own hardware/apparel company, Hardies, with teammate Na-Kel Smith. Also in 2014, Jones signed with Adidas. He made his debut solo skate video part on Adidas' full-length team video, Away Days. Jones' first signature colorway/material with Adidas came out in 2017.

In 2022, Jones left Fucking Awesome to start his own company, King Skateboards.

Jones skates regular-footed.

=== Thrasher Skater of the Year ===
In 2018, at the age of 19, Jones released one of the "most talk about parts of the year" in Supreme's video "BLESSED". Jones' part opens with a switch flip into the fountain at Washington Square Park and earned him a 2018 Skater of the Year award from Thrasher magazine, awarded to him by then editor-in-chief Jake Phelps. He is on the cover of the January 2019 issue. In 2022, Tyshawn again won Thrasher's skater of the year award. Jones appeared on the cover of the December 2022 issue. The cover photograph showed him doing a 360 flip over the subway tracks at the 145th Street Station.

=== Sponsors ===
As of October 2026, Jones' sponsors are King Skateboards, Adidas, Hardies Hardware, Thunder Trucks, Spitfire, and New Era.

=== Supreme contract violation, termination, and lawsuit ===
In 2024, Jones was terminated from Supreme for a contract violation, shortly after EssilorLuxottica bought Supreme from VF Corporation for $1.5 billion. He was also terminated after modeling a Superman sweater released by Nigo and Marc Jacobs, when the contract stated that he cannot promote brands outside of Supreme or any other sponsors. He filed a lawsuit in May 2025, and argued that Supreme waived his exclusivity to model for Louis Vuitton, Balenciaga, and Tiffany & Co. in civil court. Supreme stated that he was being paid $83,333 a month ($1M a year) to wear and model the brand, and he was 15 months shy of contract termination. Jones seeks $1.25 million in unpaid earnings and $26 million in damages, claims wrongful termination, defamation, and industry blackballing. The case is still ongoing.

=== Music video appearances ===
In May 2022, Tyshawn appears in the Kendrick Lamar music video for the song N95 featuring Baby Keem, skateboarding around the streets of New York City.
