= Tony Trujillo =

American skateboarder

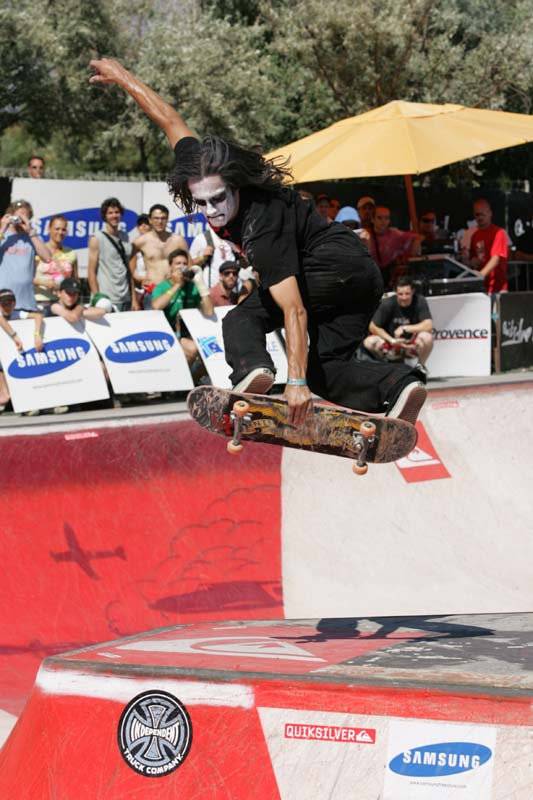
- Trujillo at the 2005 Quicksilver Bowlriders in Marseille, France
- Born: August 23, 1982 (age 43); Santa Rosa, California
- Occupations: Skateboarder, musician
- Spouse: Ashley James
- Children: 2

Tony Trujillo (born August 23, 1982) is an American professional skateboarder and musician. Trujillo was awarded the "Skater of the Year" award by Thrasher magazine in 2002.

== Early life ==
Trujillo was born in Santa Rosa, California, United States (US), and grew up on a farm with 100 acres (0.40 km^{2}) of land. He started skating at the age of seven and Trujillo was often invited to skate on the ramps in his neighbor's barn. Trujillo started competing in skateboard contests in the California Amateur Skateboard League at the age of 12 years.

== Professional skateboarding ==
At the age of fourteen, Trujillo was first sponsored by AntiHero and he was assigned professional status with the company two years later.

Trujillo has a signature shoe line with Vans and the company produced two commercials, shot by Stacy Peralta, to advertise the shoe (Trujillo appeared in both).

Trujillo appears as a playable character in the video game Tony Hawk's American Wasteland.

=== Sponsors ===
As of 2011, Trujillo is sponsored by AntiHero, Spitfire, Independent, Vans, and Fourstar.

== Awards ==
On December 7, 2002, Thrasher announced that Trujillo had been voted the magazine's thirteenth annual Skater Of The Year.

== Contest history ==
In August 2005, Trujillo placed 2nd in San Jose, CA in the Mountain Dew Tour. On August 3, 2008, Trujillo won bronze in X Games 14 Superpark competition.

== Music ==
Trujillo played bass and sang in a band called "Bad Shit", Together with the late editor-in-chief of Thrasher magazine, Jake Phelps, and his wife, Ashley "Trixie" Trujillo. The band has toured both in the US and internationally.

== Personal life ==
Trujillo is married to drummer Ashley James, also known as Trixie Trujillo and Ashley Truijillo. They married May 6, 2008 after a Thrasher Skate Rock show in Reno, NV. They are parents to their son, Waylon, who was born in December 19, 2008. As of February 7, 2014, they had another son named Reno.
