= Bergen County Special Services School District =

School district in Bergen County, New Jersey, US

Bergen County Special Services District

Address
- 540 Farview Avenue Paramus, Bergen County, New Jersey, 07652; United States
- Coordinates: 40.971597°N 74.089285°W

District information
- Grades: Special services
- Superintendent: Howard Lerner
- Business administrator: John Susino
- Schools: 6

Students and staff
- Enrollment: NA (as of 2021–22)
- Faculty: 201.8 FTEs
- Student–teacher ratio: NA

Other information
- District Factor Group: NA
- Website: www.bergen.org/bcss
Ind.	Per pupil	District spending	Rank (*)	Special services average	%± vs. average
1A	Total Spending	$93,953	8	$18,891	397.3%
1	Budgetary Cost	79,209	8	57,252	38.4%
2	Classroom Instruction	44,712	8	32,861	36.1%
6	Support Services	17,559	8	11,945	47.0%
8	Administrative Cost	6,937	7	5,725	21.2%
10	Operations & Maintenance	8,788	7	6,215	41.4%
13	Extracurricular Activities	101	1	195	−48.2%
16	Median Teacher Salary	75,800	3	77,183
Data from NJDoE 2014 Taxpayers' Guide to Education Spending. *Of Special services districts with any number of students. Lowest spending=1; Highest=8

The Bergen County Special Services School District is a special education public school district based in Paramus, serving the educational needs of classified students ages 3 to 21 from Bergen County, in the U.S. state of New Jersey. Established in 1971, it was the first of eight special services districts established in the state.

As of the 2021–22 school year, the district, comprising six schools, had an enrollment of NA students and 201.8 classroom teachers (on an FTE basis), for a student–teacher ratio of NA:1.

== History ==
The New Jersey Legislature passed an act in 1971 that created the school district.

In 1995 the administrations of this district and Bergen County Technical Schools (BCTS) combined with BCTS's administration team prevailing.

== Administration ==
Core members of the district's administration are:

- Howard Lerner, superintendent
- John Susino, business administrator and board secretary

== Schools and programs ==
Schools in the district (with 2021–22 enrollment data from the National Center for Education Statistics) are:

- Norman A. Bleshman Regional Day School (Paramus) - School for multiply impaired (with 71 students; grades 9-12)
- Brownstone School (Saddle Brook) - School for the emotionally disturbed and autistic (grades K-8)

Programs at other campuses

- Bogota Program (at Bogota Junior/Senior High School)
- Visions Becton (at Henry P. Becton Regional High School)
- Visions Paramus Elementary (at Parkway School)
- Visions Middle School Paramus (at Westbrook Middle School)
- Visions Paramus High School (at Paramus High School)
- Evergreen Program (at Leonia High School)

== Board of education ==
The district's board of education, composed of seven members, sets policy and oversees the fiscal and educational operation of the district through its administration. The county executive superintendent serves as a member, with six other members appointed by the director of the Board of County Commissioners to three-year terms on a staggered basis, with two terms up for reappointment each year. The board appoints a superintendent to oversee the district's day-to-day operations and a business administrator to supervise the business functions of the district.

== Notable alumni ==
Tyshawn Jones, born December 24th, 1998. Professional skateboarder. Attended Brownstone School in Saddle Brook, NJ from 2007-2011
