= 2022 NASCAR Cup Series Championship Race =

Season Finale 500

Race details
- Race 36 of 36 in the 2022 NASCAR Cup Series
- The 2022 NASCAR Cup Series Championship Race program cover, featuring 2021 champion Kyle Larson.
- Date: November 6, 2022
- Location: Phoenix Raceway in Avondale, Arizona
- Course: Permanent racing facility
- Course length: 1 miles (1.6 km)
- Distance: 312 laps, 312 mi (499.2 km)
- Average speed: 104.757 miles per hour (168.590 km/h)

Pole position
Driver	Joey Logano	Team Penske
- Time: 26.788

Most laps led
Driver	Joey Logano	Team Penske
- Laps: 188

Winner
No. 22	Joey Logano	Team Penske

Television in the United States
- Network: NBC
- Announcers: Rick Allen, Jeff Burton and Dale Earnhardt Jr.

Radio in the United States
- Radio: MRN
- Booth announcers: Alex Hayden, Jeff Striegle and Rusty Wallace
- Turn announcers: Dave Moody (1 & 2) and Mike Bagley (3 & 4)

The 2022 NASCAR Cup Series Championship Race was a NASCAR Cup Series race held on November 6, 2022, at Phoenix Raceway in Avondale, Arizona. Contested over 312 laps on the one mile (1.6 km) oval, it was the 36th and final race of the 2022 NASCAR Cup Series season. Joey Logano won the race, claiming his second Cup Series championship.

== Report ==
=== Background ===
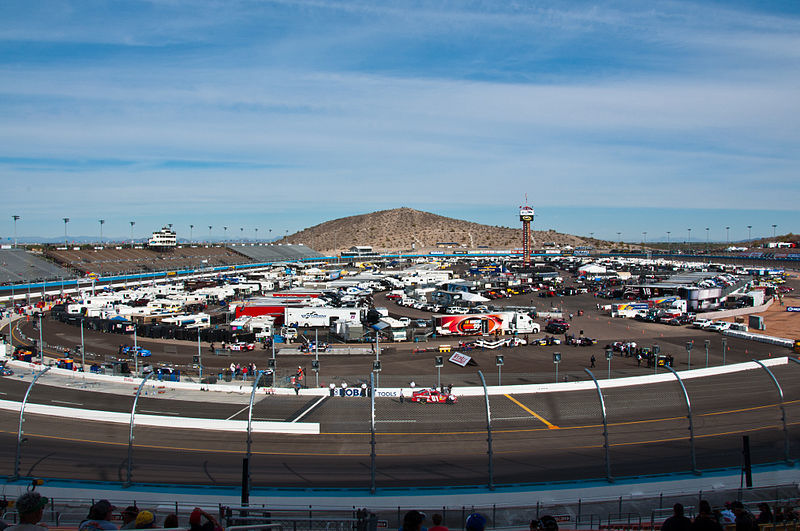
Phoenix Raceway, the track where the race was held.

Phoenix Raceway – also known as PIR – is a one-mile, low-banked tri-oval race track located in Avondale, Arizona. It is named after the nearby metropolitan area of Phoenix. The motorsport track opened in 1964 and currently hosts two NASCAR race weekends annually. PIR has also hosted the IndyCar Series, CART, USAC and the Rolex Sports Car Series. The raceway is currently owned and operated by International Speedway Corporation.

The raceway was originally constructed with a 2.5 mi (4.0 km) road course that ran both inside and outside of the main tri-oval. In 1991 the track was reconfigured with the current 1.51 mi (2.43 km) interior layout. PIR has an estimated grandstand seating capacity of around 67,000. Lights were installed around the track in 2004 following the addition of a second annual NASCAR race weekend.

Phoenix Raceway is home to two annual NASCAR race weekends, one of 13 facilities on the NASCAR schedule to host more than one race weekend a year. The track is both the first and last stop in the western United States, as well as the fourth and the last track on the schedule.

On October 28, 2022, Hendrick Motorsports announced that Alex Bowman would return to the No. 48 car for this race, having sat out the rest of Round of 12 and Round of 8 races (eliminating himself from Round of 12) after he suffered a concussion at the Texas playoff race. Ty Gibbs was set to participate in the race, but withdrew and was replaced by Daniel Hemric after the sudden death of his father Coy Gibbs the previous night.

==== Championship drivers ====
Joey Logano was the first of four drivers to clinch a spot in the Championship 4, winning the first race of the Round of 8 at Las Vegas. Christopher Bell clinched the second spot in the Championship 4, winning the final race of the Round of 8 at Martinsville. Ross Chastain and Chase Elliott clinched the remaining two spots based on points.

==== Entry list ====
- (R) denotes rookie driver.
- (i) denotes driver who is ineligible for series driver points.
- (CC) denotes Championship Contender.
- (OC) denotes Championship Contender for the Owner’s Playoffs.

No.	Driver	Team	Manufacturer
1	Ross Chastain (CC)	Trackhouse Racing Team	Chevrolet
2	Austin Cindric (R)	Team Penske	Ford
3	Austin Dillon	Richard Childress Racing	Chevrolet
4	Kevin Harvick	Stewart-Haas Racing	Ford
5	Kyle Larson (OC)	Hendrick Motorsports	Chevrolet
6	Brad Keselowski	RFK Racing	Ford
7	Corey LaJoie	Spire Motorsports	Chevrolet
8	Tyler Reddick	Richard Childress Racing	Chevrolet
9	Chase Elliott (CC)	Hendrick Motorsports	Chevrolet
10	Aric Almirola	Stewart-Haas Racing	Ford
11	Denny Hamlin	Joe Gibbs Racing	Toyota
12	Ryan Blaney	Team Penske	Ford
14	Chase Briscoe	Stewart-Haas Racing	Ford
15	Garrett Smithley (i)	Rick Ware Racing	Ford
16	A. J. Allmendinger (i)	Kaulig Racing	Chevrolet
17	Chris Buescher	RFK Racing	Ford
18	Kyle Busch	Joe Gibbs Racing	Toyota
19	Martin Truex Jr.	Joe Gibbs Racing	Toyota
20	Christopher Bell (CC)	Joe Gibbs Racing	Toyota
21	Harrison Burton (R)	Wood Brothers Racing	Ford
22	Joey Logano (CC)	Team Penske	Ford
23	Daniel Hemric (i) (Note: Ty Gibbs withdrew from the race following the unexpected death of his father and Joe Gibbs Racing co-owner Coy Gibbs. Kaulig Racing, Hemric's team in the NASCAR Xfinity Series, allowed Hemric to fill in.)	23XI Racing	Toyota
24	William Byron	Hendrick Motorsports	Chevrolet
31	Justin Haley	Kaulig Racing	Chevrolet
34	Michael McDowell	Front Row Motorsports	Ford
38	Todd Gilliland (R)	Front Row Motorsports	Ford
41	Cole Custer	Stewart-Haas Racing	Ford
42	Ty Dillon	Petty GMS Motorsports	Chevrolet
43	Erik Jones	Petty GMS Motorsports	Chevrolet
45	Bubba Wallace	23XI Racing	Toyota
47	Ricky Stenhouse Jr.	JTG Daugherty Racing	Chevrolet
48	Alex Bowman	Hendrick Motorsports	Chevrolet
51	Cody Ware	Rick Ware Racing	Ford
77	Landon Cassill (i)	Spire Motorsports	Chevrolet
78	B. J. McLeod (i)	Live Fast Motorsports	Ford
99	Daniel Suárez	Trackhouse Racing Team	Chevrolet
Official entry list

== Practice ==
Ross Chastain was the fastest in the practice session with a time of 27.019 seconds and a speed of 133.240 mph (214.429 km/h).

=== Practice results ===
Pos	No.	Driver	Team	Manufacturer	Time	Speed
1	1	Ross Chastain	Trackhouse Racing Team	Chevrolet	27.019	133.240
2	12	Ryan Blaney	Team Penske	Ford	27.060	133.038
3	18	Kyle Busch	Joe Gibbs Racing	Toyota	27.075	132.964
Official practice results

== Qualifying ==
Joey Logano scored the pole for the race with a time of 26.788 and a speed of 134.389 mph (216.278 km/h).

=== Qualifying results ===
Pos	No.	Driver	Team	Manufacturer	R1	R2
1	22	Joey Logano	Team Penske	Ford	26.648	26.788
2	12	Ryan Blaney	Team Penske	Ford	26.828	26.791
3	14	Chase Briscoe	Stewart-Haas Racing	Ford	26.617	26.825
4	5	Kyle Larson	Hendrick Motorsports	Chevrolet	26.821	26.897
5	9	Chase Elliott	Hendrick Motorsports	Chevrolet	26.808	26.979
6	21	Harrison Burton (R)	Wood Brothers Racing	Ford	26.777	27.011
7	4	Kevin Harvick	Stewart-Haas Racing	Ford	26.769	27.056
8	24	William Byron	Hendrick Motorsports	Chevrolet	26.793	27.090
9	41	Cole Custer	Stewart-Haas Racing	Ford	26.786	27.125
10	23	Ty Gibbs (i)	23XI Racing	Toyota	26.746	27.175
11	8	Tyler Reddick	Richard Childress Racing	Chevrolet	26.831	—
12	19	Martin Truex Jr.	Joe Gibbs Racing	Toyota	26.846	—
13	10	Aric Almirola	Stewart-Haas Racing	Ford	26.873	—
14	2	Austin Cindric (R)	Team Penske	Ford	26.874	—
15	3	Austin Dillon	Richard Childress Racing	Chevrolet	26.877	—
16	16	A. J. Allmendinger (i)	Kaulig Racing	Chevrolet	26.880	—
17	20	Christopher Bell	Joe Gibbs Racing	Toyota	26.881	—
18	6	Brad Keselowski	RFK Racing	Ford	26.903	—
19	17	Chris Buescher	RFK Racing	Ford	26.932	—
20	34	Michael McDowell	Front Row Motorsports	Ford	26.943	—
21	11	Denny Hamlin	Joe Gibbs Racing	Toyota	27.009	—
22	18	Kyle Busch	Joe Gibbs Racing	Toyota	27.015	—
23	45	Bubba Wallace	23XI Racing	Toyota	27.021	—
24	48	Alex Bowman	Hendrick Motorsports	Chevrolet	27.025	—
25	1	Ross Chastain	Trackhouse Racing Team	Chevrolet	27.064	—
26	31	Justin Haley	Kaulig Racing	Chevrolet	27.071	—
27	7	Corey LaJoie	Spire Motorsports	Chevrolet	27.085	—
28	99	Daniel Suárez	Trackhouse Racing Team	Chevrolet	27.114	—
29	47	Ricky Stenhouse Jr.	JTG Daugherty Racing	Chevrolet	27.143	—
30	43	Erik Jones	Petty GMS Motorsports	Chevrolet	27.226	—
31	38	Todd Gilliland (R)	Front Row Motorsports	Ford	27.256	—
32	42	Ty Dillon	Petty GMS Motorsports	Chevrolet	27.292	—
33	78	B. J. McLeod (i)	Live Fast Motorsports	Ford	27.561	—
34	51	Cody Ware	Rick Ware Racing	Ford	27.718	—
35	15	Garrett Smithley (i)	Rick Ware Racing	Ford	27.787	—
36	77	Landon Cassill (i)	Spire Motorsports	Chevrolet	28.414	—
Official qualifying results

== Race ==
- Note: Joey Logano, Christopher Bell, Ross Chastain, and Chase Elliott were not eligible for stage points because of their participation in the Championship 4.

=== Stage Results ===
Stage One Laps: 60

Pos	No	Driver	Team	Manufacturer	Points
1	22	Joey Logano	Team Penske	Ford	0
2	12	Ryan Blaney	Team Penske	Ford	9
3	14	Chase Briscoe	Stewart-Haas Racing	Ford	8
4	5	Kyle Larson	Hendrick Motorsports	Chevrolet	7
5	19	Martin Truex Jr.	Joe Gibbs Racing	Toyota	6
6	9	Chase Elliott	Hendrick Motorsports	Chevrolet	0
7	24	William Byron	Hendrick Motorsports	Chevrolet	4
8	4	Kevin Harvick	Stewart-Haas Racing	Ford	3
9	8	Tyler Reddick	Richard Childress Racing	Chevrolet	2
10	2	Austin Cindric (R)	Team Penske	Ford	1
Official stage one results

Stage Two Laps: 125

Pos	No	Driver	Team	Manufacturer	Points
1	12	Ryan Blaney	Team Penske	Ford	10
2	22	Joey Logano	Team Penske	Ford	0
3	19	Martin Truex Jr.	Joe Gibbs Racing	Toyota	8
4	14	Chase Briscoe	Stewart-Haas Racing	Ford	7
5	4	Kevin Harvick	Stewart-Haas Racing	Ford	6
6	20	Christopher Bell	Joe Gibbs Racing	Toyota	0
7	24	William Byron	Hendrick Motorsports	Chevrolet	4
8	5	Kyle Larson	Hendrick Motorsports	Chevrolet	3
9	8	Tyler Reddick	Richard Childress Racing	Chevrolet	2
10	2	Austin Cindric (R)	Team Penske	Ford	1
Official stage two results

=== Final Stage Results ===
Stage Three Laps: 127

Pos	Grid	No	Driver	Team	Manufacturer	Laps	Points
1	1	22	Joey Logano	Team Penske	Ford	312	40
2	2	12	Ryan Blaney	Team Penske	Ford	312	54
3	25	1	Ross Chastain	Trackhouse Racing Team	Chevrolet	312	34
4	3	14	Chase Briscoe	Stewart-Haas Racing	Ford	312	48
5	7	4	Kevin Harvick	Stewart-Haas Racing	Ford	312	41
6	8	24	William Byron	Hendrick Motorsports	Chevrolet	312	39
7	22	18	Kyle Busch	Joe Gibbs Racing	Toyota	312	30
8	21	11	Denny Hamlin	Joe Gibbs Racing	Toyota	312	29
9	4	5	Kyle Larson	Hendrick Motorsports	Chevrolet	312	38
10	17	20	Christopher Bell	Joe Gibbs Racing	Toyota	312	27
11	14	2	Austin Cindric (R)	Team Penske	Ford	312	28
12	16	16	A. J. Allmendinger (i)	Kaulig Racing	Chevrolet	312	0
13	15	3	Austin Dillon	Richard Childress Racing	Chevrolet	312	24
14	30	43	Erik Jones	Petty GMS Motorsports	Chevrolet	312	23
15	12	19	Martin Truex Jr.	Joe Gibbs Racing	Toyota	312	36
16	9	41	Cole Custer	Stewart-Haas Racing	Ford	312	21
17	10	23	Daniel Hemric (i)	23XI Racing	Toyota	312	0
18	27	7	Corey LaJoie	Spire Motorsports	Chevrolet	312	19
19	6	21	Harrison Burton (R)	Wood Brothers Racing	Ford	312	18
20	13	10	Aric Almirola	Stewart-Haas Racing	Ford	312	17
21	19	17	Chris Buescher	RFK Racing	Ford	312	16
22	23	45	Bubba Wallace	23XI Racing	Toyota	311	15
23	11	8	Tyler Reddick	Richard Childress Racing	Chevrolet	311	18
24	28	99	Daniel Suárez	Trackhouse Racing Team	Chevrolet	311	13
25	20	34	Michael McDowell	Front Row Motorsports	Ford	311	12
26	32	42	Ty Dillon	Petty GMS Motorsports	Chevrolet	311	11
27	26	31	Justin Haley	Kaulig Racing	Chevrolet	311	10
28	5	9	Chase Elliott	Hendrick Motorsports	Chevrolet	310	9
29	31	38	Todd Gilliland (R)	Front Row Motorsports	Ford	309	8
30	34	51	Cody Ware	Rick Ware Racing	Ford	308	7
31	33	78	B. J. McLeod (i)	Live Fast Motorsports	Ford	307	0
32	29	47	Ricky Stenhouse Jr.	JTG Daugherty Racing	Chevrolet	307	5
33	35	15	Garrett Smithley (i)	Rick Ware Racing	Ford	304	0
34	24	48	Alex Bowman	Hendrick Motorsports	Chevrolet	304	3
35	18	6	Brad Keselowski	RFK Racing	Ford	270	2
36	36	77	Landon Cassill (i)	Spire Motorsports	Chevrolet	84	0
Official race results

=== Race statistics ===
- Lead changes: 11 among 16 different drivers
- Cautions/Laps: 6 for 39
- Red flags: 0
- Time of race: 2 hours, 58 minutes and 42 seconds
- Average speed: 104.757 miles per hour (168.590 km/h)

== Media ==
=== Television ===
NBC Sports covered the race on the television side. Rick Allen, two–time Phoenix winner Jeff Burton and three-time Phoenix winner Dale Earnhardt Jr. called the race from the broadcast booth. Dave Burns, Parker Kligerman, Marty Snider and Dillon Welch were the pit reporters. Rutledge Wood, who reported select races for NASCAR on NBC from outside the track in the city/metropolitan area of the racetrack in 2022, was at this race in-person serving as a roving reporter.

Steve Letarte, normally in NBC's broadcast booth, had to miss the race due to having an emergency appendectomy.

NBC
Booth announcers	Pit reporters	Roving reporter
Lap-by-lap: Rick Allen; Color-commentator: Jeff Burton; Color-commentator: Dale Earnhardt Jr.	Dave Burns; Parker Kligerman; Marty Snider; Dillon Welch	Rutledge Wood

=== Radio ===
MRN covered the radio call for the race, which was also simulcast on Sirius XM NASCAR Radio. Alex Hayden, Jeff Striegle and Rusty Wallace called the action from the broadcast booth when the field races down the front straightaway. Dave Moody called the action from turns 1 & 2 and Mike Bagley called the action from turns 3 & 4. Kim Coon, Steve Post, Brienne Pedigo and Jason Toy covered the action for MRN from pit lane.

MRN
Booth announcers	Turn announcers	Pit reporters
Lead announcer: Alex Hayden; Announcer: Jeff Striegle; Announcer: Rusty Wallace	Turns 1 & 2: Dave Moody; Turns 3 & 4: Mike Bagley	Kim Coon; Steve Post; Brienne Pedigo; Jason Toy

== Standings after the race ==
Drivers' Championship standings

	Pos	Driver	Points
	1	Joey Logano	5,040
1	2	Ross Chastain	5,034 (–6)
1	3	Christopher Bell	5,027 (–13)
	4	Chase Elliott	5,009 (–31)
	5	Denny Hamlin	2,379 (–2,661)
	6	William Byron	2,378 (–2,662)
	7	Kyle Larson	2,354 (–2,686)
	8	Ryan Blaney	2,354 (–2,686)
1	9	Chase Briscoe	2,292 (–2,748)
1	10	Daniel Suárez	2,272 (–2,768)
	11	Austin Dillon	2,228 (–2,812)
	12	Austin Cindric	2,226 (–2,814)
1	13	Kyle Busch	2,224 (–2,816)
1	14	Tyler Reddick	2,215 (–2,825)
1	15	Kevin Harvick	2,126 (–2,914)
1	16	Alex Bowman	2,107 (–2,933)
Official driver's standings

Manufacturers' Championship standings

Pos	Manufacturer	Points
1	Chevrolet	1,324
2	Ford	1,250 (–74)
3	Toyota	1,188 (–136)

- Note: Only the first 16 positions are included for the driver standings.

== Notes ==
Previous race: 2022 Xfinity 500	NASCAR Cup Series; 2022 season	Next race: 2023 Daytona 500
