= Slap (magazine) =

Skate magazine and later website

Slap Magazine
- Categories: Skate magazine
- Frequency: Monthly
- First issue: 1992
- Final issue: 2008
- Company: Thrasher (magazine)
- Country: United States
- Language: English
- Website: https://www.slapmagazine.com/

Slap Magazine is an American skate magazine created by Kevin Thatcher and Fausto one late night when they sparked an idea to create their own competition. At the time they ran Thrasher Skateboard Mag. The next day they put Lance Dawes in charge of it (1992), while he worked for Thrasher. Slap was distributed by High Speed Productions for 16 years. The Slap Magazine website still serves as a highly popular message board for skateboarding content and conversation.

== Magazine history ==
Dawes worked at Thrasher as a darkroom technician, developing film and printing for the magazine. It was Thrasher's idea to start a new magazine, choosing Dawes to spearhead it because he was the youngest employee that worked at Thrasher and was a dedicated skateboarder, often skating at Embarcadero.

The first issue, April 1992, featured Mike Carroll with a backside 50-50, photographed by Dawes. Slap magazine was for many years under the editorial stewardship of Mark Whiteley. Additional contributors to Slap magazine were: Joe Brook, Tim Butler, Brandy Faucette, John Trippe, Dave Schubert, and a long list of staff and other contributors.

The last Slap print issue was in December 2008. Despite discontinuing its publishing, Slap has continued to publish skate media with its website and online message board, which is known as the go-to place for skateboarding rumors and news.
