= Wes Kremer =

American skateboarder (born 1989)

Wes Kremer (born November 27, 1989) is an American professional skateboarder. He was named Skater of the Year in 2014 by Thrasher magazine.

== Early life ==
Kremer was born in Tokyo while his American parents were living there for work.

== Professional skateboarding ==
He has been a professional since 2013.

== Sponsors ==
Kremer is currently sponsored by SK8MAFIA, OJ Wheels, Paradox grip, Bronze 56k and Independent Truck Company.
