= Michelle de Swarte =

English actress, comedian, presenter, and former model

- Born: 1980 (age 45–46); Lewisham, London, England
- Occupations: Actress; comedian; model; presenter
- Spouse: Jason Dill (m. 2009; div. 2020)
- Website: michelledeswarte.com

Michelle de Swarte (born 1980) is an English actress, comedian, presenter, and former model. She starred in the Netflix series The Duchess, and created, wrote and starred in the BBC series Spent.

== Early life ==
De Swarte was born in Lewisham, South London to a Jewish mother and a Jamaican father and grew up in Brixton. She was diagnosed with dyslexia as a child.

== Career ==
=== Modelling ===
De Swarte was scouted by a modelling agency at the age of 19, while working at SegaWorld London. She subsequently relocated to New York to continue her modelling career, before returning to Britain and moving into comedy.

De Swarte's beauty product campaigns include Make-up Art Cosmetics, Sephora and Neutrogena. She has also been photographed for Burberry, Tommy Hilfiger, Cartier, Betsey Johnson, Michael Kors, Baby Phat, H&M, Gap and Levis, by photographers such as Mario Testino, Peter Lindbergh, Patrick Demarchelier and Steven Meisel, and featured in fashion spreads for Harper's Bazaar, Italian Vanity Fair and V. She modelled for Copperwheat Blundell (Ready-to-Wear Fall/Winter 2000 fashion show), Luella, Missoni (Ready-to-Wear Spring/Summer 2002 fashion shows), and during the Ready-to-Wear Fall/Winter 2002 fashion week she modelled for Dolce & Gabbana, Gucci, John Galliano and Versus Versace. Her runway career abruptly ended after she fell down repeatedly and removed her shoes while walking for the Gucci Fall/Winter 2002 Ready-to-Wear fashion show where the catwalk was covered in faux sheepskin.

=== Television ===
De Swarte's TV credits include presenting celebrity gossip show Dirty Digest for E4, The Fashion Show, a 10-episode mini-series with George Lamb and Abbey Clancy which aired on ITV2 from September to November 2008, hosting the live broadcast of Arthur's Day celebrations, and being a talking head on BBC's The Noughties.. Was That It? in 2009. She also appeared on a number of panel shows for Channel 4, BBC, ITV and Comedy Central.

In 2015, she began reporting for Vice America doing a range of documentaries covering issues from FGM to female magicians, as well as the Emmy-nominated series Woman, produced by Gloria Steinem for Viceland USA.

She has also starred in the 2020 British comedy-drama series, The Duchess, and the 2022 British horror comedy limited series, The Baby.

2024 saw the release of de Swarte's self-written sitcom, Spent, on BBC Two, which was loosely based on her own experiences in the modelling industry.

=== Stand-up ===
On Live at the Apollo, De Swarte narrates her Jeffrey Epstein-Jean-Luc Brunel encounter.

== Personal life ==
De Swarte is bisexual. She married American professional skateboarder Jason Dill in 2009; he filed for divorce in 2020. In April 2025, she was announced as an ambassador for The Big Issue.

== TV productions ==
- 2008: The Fashion Show (Princess Productions for ITV2 with George Lamb and Abigail Clancy)
- 2009: Arthur's Day Celebrations (ITV2 and Sky, with Cat Deeley and Ronan Keating)
- 2009: I'm a Celebrity: Unpacked (ITV2, filmed in Australia)
- 2011: Dirty Digest (E4)
- 2024: Spent (BBC Two)
- 2025: RuPaul's Drag Race UK (BBC Three, Series 7 & Series 8)
