= Fucking Awesome =

American company and brand

Fucking Awesome (also known simply as FA due to the use of the expletive fuck in the business's full name) is an American skateboard company and streetwear brand. FA was created by professional skateboarders Jason Dill and Anthony Van Engelen. FA has collaborated with brands like Vans, Adidas, and Independent Trucks.

FA has a sister brand called "Hockey." FA is close to Hockey, and the brand often releases video parts using both sets of teams.

== Team ==
FA currently harbors two skate teams, Fucking Awesome and Hockey.

=== FA roster ===
- Jason Dill
- Anthony Van Engelen
- Kevin Bradley
- Gino Iannucci
- Sage Elsesser
- Elijah Berle
- Aidan Mackey
- Louie Lopez
- Curren Caples
- Jake Anderson
- Romel Torres

=== Hockey roster ===
- John Fitzgerald
- Ben Kadow
- Andrew Allen
- Diego Todd
- Kevin Rodrigues
- Nik Stain
- Cruise Mosberg
- Nico Jones
- Nick Michel

=== Past members ===
- Dylan Rieder
- Kevin Terpening
- Tyshawn Jones
- Na-Kel Smith
- Sean Pablo
- Vincent Touzery
- Caleb Barnett
- Donovon Piscopo
- Joseph Campos
- Beatrice Domond

== Store ==
In 2019, FA opened its first physical location in Los Angeles on Hollywood Boulevard. They opened their second location in 2021 in Lower Manhattan, New York City.

== Dylan Rieder ==
Dylan Rieder was a professional skateboarder and model who was a founding member of the Fucking Awesome team. Rieder died in 2016 due to complications from leukemia. The company frequently memorialized him.

== Videos ==
FA — and its sister brand Hockey — have released numerous skateboarding videos.

- Hockey
- Hockey II
- Hockey III
- Hockey IV
- Hockey X
- Industrial Light and Magic
- Triple Backflip
- 420 E 9th St
- Louie Lopez Days of Grace
- Louie Lopez Again and Again
- Dancing on Thin Ice

== Adidas ==
FA has collaborated with Adidas twice.
