= Deluxe Distribution =

American skateboarding equipment manufacturer

S.F. Deluxe Productions, Inc.
- Trade name: Deluxe Distribution
- Type: Private company
- Industry: Skateboarding
- Founded: 1986
- Founder: Fausto Vitello, Brian Ware
- Headquarters: 120 Mississippi Street, San Francisco, California, US, 94107-2524, San Francisco, California, United States, United States (US)
- Area served: Worldwide
- Key people: Fausto Vitello, Tommy Guerrero, Jim Thiebaud, Mickey Reyes, Jeff Klindt
- Products: Hard and soft goods
- Brands: Antihero; DLXSF; Krooked; Real; Spitfire Wheels; There; Thunder Trucks; Unity; Venture
- Number of employees: 45
- Parent: Ermico Enterprises, Inc.
- Website: dlxsf.com

Deluxe Distribution is an Ermico Enterprises, Inc.-owned American skateboarding company founded in 1986 with limited partner Brian Ware in San Francisco. Deluxe was formed to distribute the Beware Record label, and other small record labels popular with skateboarders, along with Thunder Trucks and Supercush Bushings. Deluxe distributes six skateboard brands and owns DLXSF, a retail outlet.

== Brands ==
Spitfire logo

=== Spitfire Wheels ===
Spitfire is a skateboard wheels company that was founded by Jim Thiebaud in 1987. The company released a video, entitled Spitfire, in 1993. The company also produces skateboard bearings, skateboard tools, griptape, and soft goods (e.g. T-shirts, gloves, caps), stickers, and accessories (e.g. bags, wallets, air freshener).

As of fall/autumn 2012, notable team-riders from the company's roster include Bryan Herman, Andy Roy, Peter Hewitt, Theotis Beasley, Peter Ramondetta, Erik Ellington, Dennis Busenitz, Andrew Reynolds, Sean Malto, Brian "Slash" Hansen, Trevor Colden, Grant Taylor, Dylan Rieder, Chris Pfanner, Vincent Alvarez, Louie Lopez, Eric Koston, Chris Cole, Omar Salazar, Mike Mo Capaldi, John Cardiel, Tyshawn Jones, Mike Anderson, Shane O'neill, and Guy Mariano.

Individual video parts have been released by Spitfire team riders in the 21st century, either as an introduction to the team, or to accompany the release of a new product. Notable video parts include Reynolds' introduction part, Capaldi's introduction part (in the form of a mock "Sponsor-me" video), and Daewon Song's promotional part for the "Enter the Daewon" signature wheel model.

=== Real ===
==== Origin ====
Real Skateboards is a skateboard company that was founded in 1991 by Tommy Guerrero and Jim Thiebaud, ex-Powell Skateboards riders at the time of formation, with support from skateboarding pioneer and entrepreneur, Fausto Vitello. Guererro explained in a twenty-year anniversary interview:

I'm not quite sure how me and Thiebaud met; through mutual friends, I think. We were skating together all the time, when he moved to the city and I was giving him Powell gear, and that's, and then he got on Powell, you know, after that—he just felt it wasn't right, you know? And, he went to skate for Natas. You know, he skated for, for, SMA for a while, and then the opportunity came to do something with Real. He approached me, but also Fausto and those guys approached me to be part of it, and at that point in time, at Powell, I was sort of being put on the back burner—'cause all the young guns coming, and I felt it, I knew, you know. And I figured, shit, I want to stay, stay in this world for as long as I can. You know, who wants to grow up? ... And we were sort of the first to start our thing on our own, in the sense that we were spearheading it and we did whatever we wanted ... Skateboarding is, it's not, it's not about stardom, or any of that stuff; it has nothing to do with it. So we kind of took it back, back into the streets ... Skating has to be raw—you gotta keep it raw and I think Real has done a good job of that. It was all about just friends doing something together that they believed in. when you have that, it's kind of unstoppable.

Guererro, an accomplished musician in addition to his ongoing role at Real, has praised Thiebaud for his commitment to the company, explaining that, "Jim has held it down ... and really is, the genius behind Real. It's all owed to the skaters and to Jim; all skaters past, present, and to come. '91—when we first got our boards in, and, um ... and that's why we're here today, twenty years later."

In 2012, Real released the Pushing series that featured video parts of its riders showcasing locations in the North American continent, according to the hometowns of the team riders—the parts were named after the respective locations, e.g. Pushing Georgia and Pushing Vancouver. Senior team riders Dennis Busenitz, Ernie Torres, and Peter Ramondetta (with Kyle Walker) were featured "pushing" San Francisco, Colorado, and Oklahoma, respectively. The series blurb explained: "As part of this year's summer tour the REAL riders each went home to push. Not only to skate the streets they call home, but to push the areas themselves."

==== Actions REALized ====
In May 2013, Thiebaud collaborated with longtime friend Billie Joe Armstrong from American band Green Day to form the Actions REALized X Green Day collaboration deck project in support of the Children's Hospital and Research Center Oakland that is based in California, U.S. The Center is the Bay Area's sole independent children's hospital and a portion of the proceeds from the sales of the skateboard decks will be donated to benefit the Center's mission to care for every child who needs help, regardless of their financial status. The fundraising campaign is part of Real's "Actions REALized" division that undertakes projects based on the premise that "skateboarding can be a positive force for change", and past projects have contributed to efforts to combat childhood leukemia and the relief efforts in the wake of the 2011 Japanese earthquake.

==== Team ====
According to the company's website, the 2023 Real team consists of Dennis Busenitz, Ishod Wair, Chima Ferguson, Kyle Walker, Mason Silva, Jack Olson, Jake Donnelly, Nicole Hause, Max Schaaf, Jimmy Wilkins, Patrick Praman, Zion Wright, Harry Lintell, Gage Boyle, Tanner Van Vark, Christian Henry, Dan Mancina and Hermann Stene.

=== Anti Hero Skateboards ===
==== Origin ====
AntiHero is a board company that was founded by professional skateboarder Julien Stranger in 1995, following a proposition from Thiebaud, who is reported—by Jake Phelps, editor-in-chief of Thrasher —to have offered Stranger the opportunity during a period of time when both Stranger and Phelps perceived skateboarding as "stale". Stranger has explained the original concept that underpinned AntiHero in the following manner: "Oh, there's was no concept ... well, maybe there was, I don't know. Just kind of balance out the rest, or something, with what was going on with us." Phelps has stated further to Stranger's vague explanation:

I think if you pay attention to life and the way things are, that you, you come out pretty jaded by, you know, life. Or things aren't the way they should be. I think Anti Hero is a reflection of that. I think Julian's own twisted take on things has been, like I said, there's no expectation—we just skate, we fuck off, we have a good time. We go to trips sometimes and nothing happened. Or sometime we go on a trip and everything happens at once; you never know. And I think that that translates very much into John's way of life—whether it's hunting, fishing, or whatever, John's [Cardiel] an outdoorsman, and I think that, that hearty spirit of America translated very well with Julian's gritty grime of, like, the city slime, into making a really solid, "This is what it is to us."

Longtime professional skateboarder Jeff Grosso, who grew up skateboarding with prominent figures such as Neil Blender and Lance Mountain, joined the company in early 2011 and explained the process in an August 2013 interview: "I'll ask, I'll shoot at the mountaintop, and maybe I'll land at base camp. Once I got the courage to call them up, or whatever, and then they were like, 'Well, we have to vote.', or whatever, 'cause they run it like a gang ... So once I found out that they all, like, voted yes ... it was a proud moment."

The company commenced 2014 with the addition of Grant Taylor to the team on January 1, releasing a promotional image that states: "Grant Taylor ... is in the van!" A corresponding three-minute video was also released to acknowledge the recruitment, featuring the accompanying print advertisement that reads: "GRANTIHERO Grant Taylor ... Flys with the Eagle!" Formerly a member of the Alien Workshop team, Taylor was the recipient of Thrasher's prestigious "Skater of the Year" award in 2011.

==== "Beauty and the Beast" collaboration ====
AntiHero has worked on collaborative tours and subsequent videos with Girl Skateboards, entitled "Beauty and the Beast" (parts, 1, 2, and 3). Highly regarded professional skateboarder Mike Carroll, who is also a part owner in the Girl company, has named Stranger as one of his two key influences—the other is former Blind team rider, actor, and co-owner of Stereo, Jason Lee.

==== Team ====
AntiHero's team consists of Julien Stranger, Grant Taylor, John Cardiel, Frank Gerwer, Tony "T-Mo" Miorana, Albino, Tony Trujillo, Peter Hewitt, Raney Beres, Ryan "Peabody" McWhittier, Pat "Patlanta" McClain, Errol, Sean "the Gut" Gutierrez & Byron "Fatty" Ortega, Robbie Russo, Austin Kanfoush, Div Adams, Daan Van Der Linden, Chris Pfanner, and Brian Anderson.

Jeff Grosso was also a signature member of AntiHero's team prior to his death in 2020.

=== Krooked ===
==== Origin ====
Krooked is a skateboarding company founded by Mark "Gonz" Gonzales in 2002, who is also the brand's creative director, with Gonzales responsible for the majority of the graphics, art, promotional material, and advertisements for the brand. Gonzales is highly regarded in the global skateboard sub-culture and was named by the Transworld Skateboarding magazine as the most influential skateboarder of all time in its "30 Most Influential Skaters of All Time" list, published in December 2011.

==== Video productions ====
The Krooked company has released a number of videos, adopting the unusual practice of using different formats for different productions: the Krook3d (2010) video was the first 3D (three-dimensional) skate video to ever be produced; Gnar Gnar (2007), limited to 1000 copies, was released in the anachronistic VHS video tape format; and Krooked Kronichles (2006) and "Naughty" (2008) were filmed entirely with digital cameras.

==== Team ====
According to the company's fall/autumn 2013 catalogue, the Krooked team consists of Mike Anderson, Dan Drehobl, Bobby Worrest, Brad Cromer, David Clark, Sebo Walker, Eddie Cernicky, Ronnie Sandoval and Mark "Gonz" Gonzalez.

==== Van Wastell ====
Former Krooked professional team rider, Van Wastell, was killed after an accidental fall from a balcony in Berlin, Germany, during a European skate tour on September 5, 2008. Wastell's life has been commemorated with events and published articles since the skateboarder's death.

=== Thunder Trucks ===
Thunder is the oldest company in the Deluxe roster and produces skateboard trucks.

According to the company's fall/autumn 2012 catalogue, the Thunder team consists of Ed Templeton, Chima Ferguson, Mikey Taylor, Chris Miller, Collin Provost, Chris Cole, Justin Brock, Mark Appleyard, and Neen Williams. However, in 2012, Tom Asta, Kyle Frederick, Ishod Wair, Dane Burman, Zach Miller, Walker Ryan, Mark Suciu, Luis Tolentino, Erik Ellington, Bryan Herman, Ernie Torres, Trevor Colden, Sean Malto, and Alex Perelson all filmed promotional videos for the brand.

=== Venture ===
On June 20, 2011, a press release announced the distribution of the Venture skateboard truck brand by Deluxe, following a transition from the now-defunct Streetcorner Distribution company. Venture trucks are manufactured in the United States and sponsors a team of professional skateboarders. In November 2012, Plan B rider Felipe Gustavo was added to the Venture team and the company produced a truck dedicated to Gustavo's father, a longtime supporter of his son's skateboarding. Blind Skateboards' professional skateboarder, Kevin Romar, released a signature model truck, entitled the "Cypress V-Light", in January 2013 and an accompanying promotional video was also published, in which Romar performs a series of switch-stance (opposite to his natural stance on a skateboard) tricks.

As of fall/autumn 2013, sponsored riders include Jack Curtin, Stefan Janoski, Gino Ianucci, Torey Pudwill, Stevie Williams, Terry Kennedy, Rodrigo Teixera ("TX"), Morgan Smith, Felipe Gustavo, Keelan Dadd, Kevin Romar, Sewa Kroetkov, Michael Bowen, and Paul Rodriguez.
