= Fausto Vitello =

Argentine businessman

- Born: August 7, 1946; Buenos Aires, Argentina
- Died: April 22, 2006 (aged 59)

Fausto Vitello (August 7, 1946 – April 22, 2006) was an Argentine-American businessman, magazine publisher, and skateboarder. Vitello was the creator of Thrasher Magazine and co-founder of Independent Trucks.

== Early life ==
Vitello was born in Buenos Aires, Argentina, but his family left when he was 9 to escape the political terror of the Revolución Libertadora. His family moved to San Francisco, in the U.S. state of California, and he was raised on Frederick Street in the Haight-Ashbury neighborhood. Vitello did not speak any English upon arriving. He taught himself English by listening to San Francisco Giants broadcasts, starting a lifelong love for the Giants. Vitello spent a year at the University of California, Berkeley, before transferring and eventually graduating from San Francisco State University with a degree in Spanish. He met his future wife Gwynn Rose on campus and they married after graduation.

== Career ==
In the late 1970s skateboarding's popularity was waning. Vitello and business partner Eric Swenson along with Richard Novak and Jay Shuirman who owned Santa Cruz Skateboards saw an opportunity to work together, subsequently founding Independent Truck Company. Independent Trucks quickly became an industry leader and the group saw the opportunity to expand and capitalize upon the rediscovery of skateboarding in America.

In 1981, Vitello co-founded the skateboarding magazine Thrasher. The photos and articles brought the latest tricks, fashions, and gear to the attention of the youth of America, contributing to rise of the skateboard culture in America. The advertisements also helped push the success of Independent Trucks, which was quickly becoming one of the largest names in skateboarding. While many were still dismissing skateboarding as a fad, Thrasher helped establish it as a dominant subculture that has evolved into the billion dollar industry it is today.

As Vitello's business empire grew, so did the number of projects he undertook. He started High Speed Productions, which published Slap magazine, and the international alternative art magazine, Juxtapoz. He also founded two skateboard distribution companies: Deluxe (which distributes Spitfire Wheels, Thunder Trucks, Venture Trucks, Antihero Skateboards, Real Skateboards and Krooked Skateboards), and Street Corner (which distributes Hubba Wheels, Think Skateboards, Lucky Bearings and Venture trucks).

== Death ==
Vitello died on April 22, 2006, of a heart attack while riding on his bicycle with his best friend, Lin Ho. After Vitello's death, his wife Gwynn became president of High Speed Productions, Sally his daughter handles marketing and sales, while Tony his son holds Thrasher Magazine.
