= Jake Phelps =

American skateboarder and magazine editor (1962–2019)

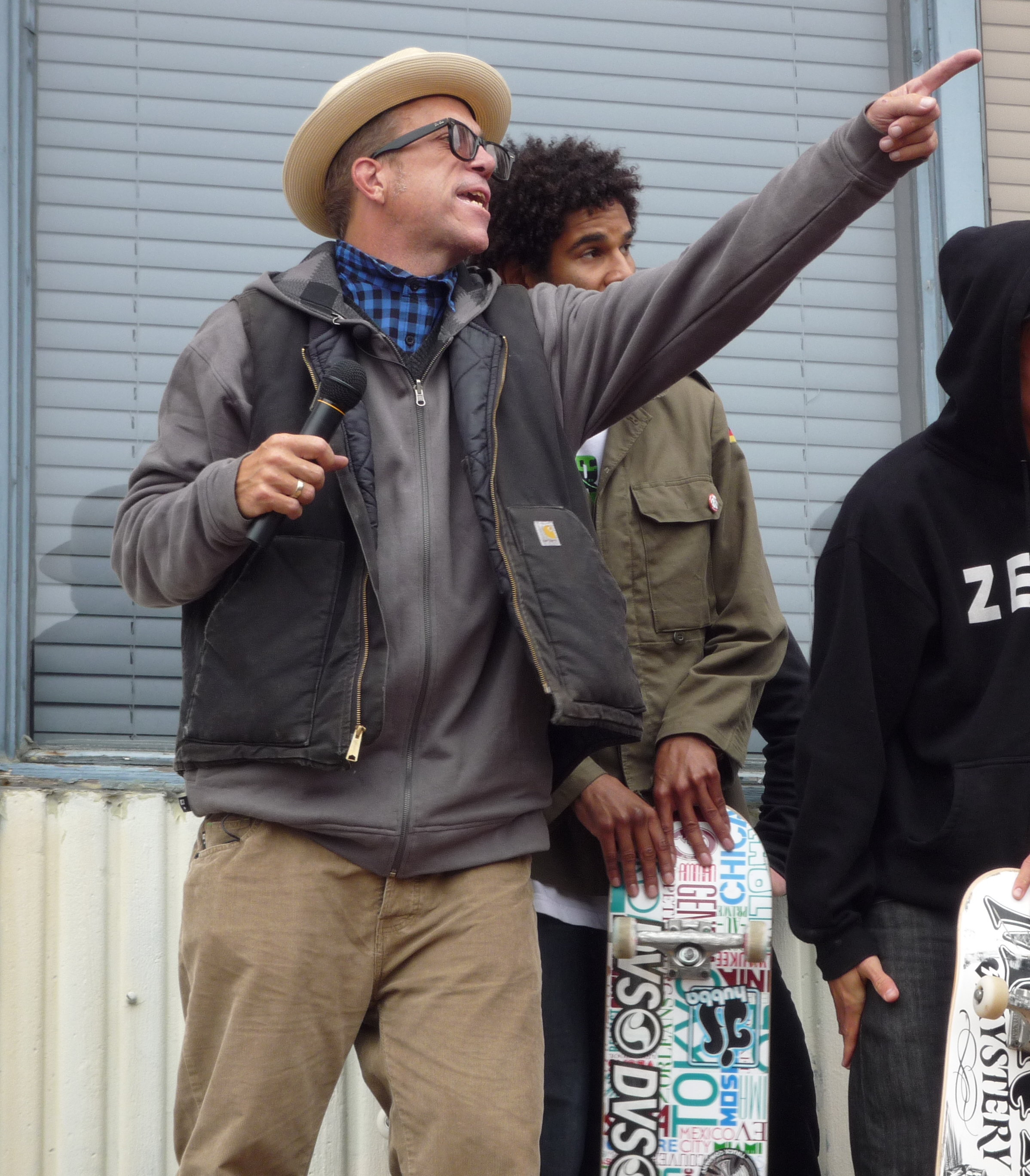
- Phelps at a 2009 skateboarding contest
- Born: James Kendall Phelps; September 24, 1962; San Francisco, California, U.S.
- Died: March 14, 2019 (aged 56); San Francisco, California, U.S.
- Other name: Phelper
- Occupation: magazine editor

James Kendall "Jake" Phelps (September 24, 1962 – March 14, 2019) was an American skateboarder and magazine editor. Phelps led the magazine Thrasher as editor-in-chief for 27 years.

== Early life ==
James Kendall Phelps was born in San Francisco, California, to parents Kitty and Kendall Phelps, and lived there until the age of 11. His parents called him "J. K.", which eventually became "Jake". He had a sister, Marie. After his parents split up, he lived with his mother in Marblehead, Massachusetts.

Phelps began skating at the age of 13. In 1977, Phelps began working at Zero Gravity, a skate park in Cambridge, Massachusetts. For a short time, he was hired by PepsiCo to do skate demos in schools. Phelps dropped out of high school by the end of the 1970s.

During the early '80s, Jake became friends with members of the hardcore punk band SSD (Society System Decontrol). He often traveled with the band and was involved in the early Boston hardcore scene.

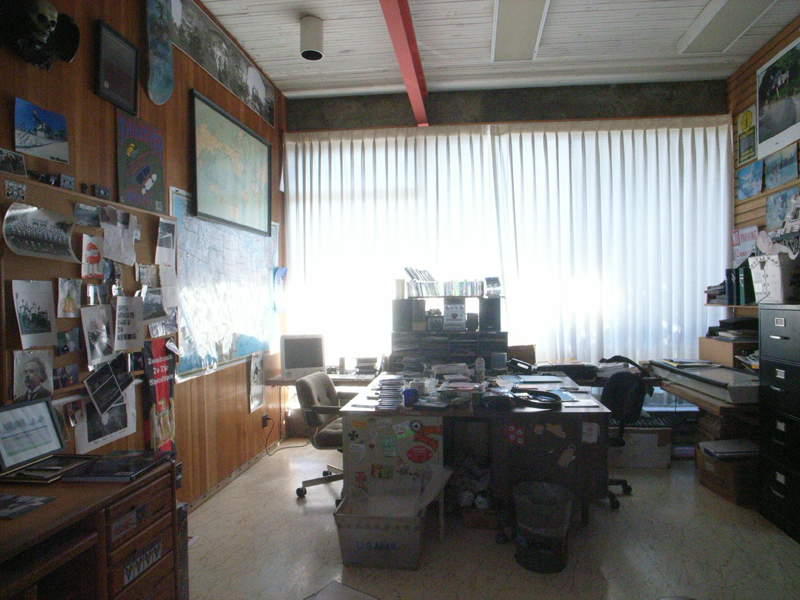
Jake Phelps' desk at Thrasher, 2008

== Career ==
Phelps moved back to San Francisco in the early 1980s. He began working for Thrasher while he worked at Concrete Jungle skate shop in the Haight district. While working at the shop, Thrasher's editor, Kevin Thatcher, approached Phelps to write a product review column. In 1993, after boxing merchandise for a few years in the shipping department at Thrasher, Phelps was promoted to editor, where he remained for 26 years.

As Thrasher's editor, Phelps selected the Skater of the Year (SOTY) beginning in 1993. Phelps's final selection, the 2018 SOTY, was Tyshawn Jones.

== Personal life ==
=== Music ===
Beginning in August 2005, Phelps played lead guitar in a band, Bad Shit, with Tony Trujillo and Trujillo's wife, Ashley "Trixie" Trujillo. The band toured both in the US and internationally.

In July 2017, Phelps suffered a serious head injury while skating near Dolores Park in San Francisco during an unpermitted event.

=== Death ===
Phelps was found dead on March 14, 2019 (aged 56). His death was announced on a Thrasher Instagram post and he was cremated with his skateboard. Phelps's official cause of death was acute fentanyl intoxication, which helped increase awareness about fentanyl overdoses.
