= Thrasher (magazine) =

American skateboarding magazine

- November 2007 cover with Steve Nesser
- Editor: Michael Burnett
- Former editors: Kevin Thatcher, Jake Phelps
- Staff writers: Eddie Hobbs
- Categories: Skateboarding
- Frequency: Monthly
- Circulation: 250,000
- Publisher: High Speed Productions
- Founder: Eric Swenson; Fausto Vitello
- First issue: January 1981; 45 years ago
- Country: United States
- Based in: San Francisco, California
- Language: English; French (2006–2012)
- Website: thrashermagazine.com
- ISSN: 0889-0692
- OCLC: 13789617

Thrasher is an American skateboarding media brand founded in January 1981 by Eric Swenson and Fausto Vitello, who also founded Independent Truck Company, and officially launched as a skateboard magazine. Since the 1990s, Thrasher has expanded its presence in television, video production, online blogging and merchandising.

== History ==
Thrasher was founded in 1981 by Fausto Vitello and Eric Swenson, primarily as a way to promote Independent Truck Company, their skateboard truck company. The magazine's first editor was Kevin Thatcher. Photographer/graphic designer/illustrator/journalist/Assistant Publisher/General Manager, Mörizen Föche - aka Mofo, became the second staff member, joining Thatcher in mid-1981.

In 2016, Mofo was inducted into the Skateboarding Hall of Fame.

In 1989, Cara-Beth Burnside became the first woman to appear on the cover of Thrasher.

In 1993, Jake Phelps was named editor of the magazine. In 1999, the magazine sponsored a PlayStation game called Thrasher Presents Skate and Destroy. Vitello's son, Tony, took over as owner of the magazine after his father died of a heart attack in 2006, and Swenson died by suicide in 2011. On March 14, 2019, long-time editor Jake Phelps died.

In 2017, Thrasher was inducted into the Skateboarding Hall of Fame.

The company also owns and operates the Double Rock indoor skateboarding facility, and the San Francisco skateshop, 66 6th.

Photographer Michael Burnett is the magazine's current editor-in-chief.

== Website ==
The magazine's website features regularly updated episodes of segments and hosts a forum in which registered users can engage in online discussion.

Segments Include:

- "Burnout" (long-running photographic blog operated by senior staff photographer Michael Burnett)
- "Double Rock"
- "Firing Line"
- "Hall of Meat" (Video segments featuring skateboarders injuring themselves during trick attempts)
- "Skateline" (Hosted by Gary Rogers)
- "Bru-Ray" (Tour edits by Thrasher Magazine filmer P-Stone)
- "My War" (In-depth video footage following individual skaters and their struggles in completing an iconic or famous trick)
- "Manramp" (A 6-episode series featuring Manramp, skateboarding's iconic mascot)

== Skater of the Year ==
The title of "Skater of the Year" is awarded annually by Thrasher. The tradition was started in 1990, and the accolade remains one of the most respected awards in global skateboarding culture. The title is bestowed to one skater annually and announced by Thrasher's editor. Chris Cole, Danny Way, Tyshawn Jones and Jamie Foy are the only double recipients.

Year	Skater of the Year	Age	Stance	Team	Shoe sponsor
1990	(United States) Tony Hawk	22	Goofy	Powell Peralta	Airwalk
1991	(United States) Danny Way	17	Regular	Plan B Skateboards	DC
1992	(United States) John Cardiel	19	Goofy	Black Label Skateboards	Vans
1993	(United States) Salman Agah	21	Regular	Real Skateboards	Vans
1994	(United States) Mike Carroll	19	Goofy	Girl Skateboards	Vans
1995	(United States) Chris Senn	23	Regular	Adrenalin Skateboards	Emerica
1996	(United States) Eric Koston	21	Goofy	Girl Skateboards	eS
1997	(Brazil) Bob Burnquist	21	Regular	Antihero Skateboards	eS
1998	(United States) Andrew Reynolds	20	Regular	Birdhouse Skateboards	Emerica
1999	(United States) Brian Anderson	23	Regular	Toy Machine	Savier
2000	(England) Geoff Rowley	24	Regular	Flip Skateboards	Vans
2001	(Finland) Arto Saari	20	Regular	Flip Skateboards	eS
2002	(United States) Tony Trujillo	20	Regular	Antihero Skateboards	Vans
2003	(Canada) Mark Appleyard	21	Goofy	Flip Skateboards	Globe
2004	(United States) Danny Way (2)	30	Regular	Alien Workshop	DC
2005	(United States) Chris Cole	23	Regular	Zero Skateboards	Fallen
2006	(United States) Daewon Song	31	Goofy	Almost Skateboards	DVS
2007	(United States) Marc Johnson	30	Regular	Chocolate Skateboards	Lakai
2008	(United States) Silas Baxter-Neal	24	Goofy	Habitat Skateboards	Adidas
2009	(United States) Chris Cole (2)	27	Regular	Zero Skateboards	Fallen
2010	(United States) Leo Romero	24	Regular	Toy Machine	Emerica
2011	(United States) Grant Taylor	20	Goofy	Alien Workshop	Nike
2012	(Colombia) David Gonzalez	22	Goofy	Flip Skateboards	Globe
2013	(United States) Ishod Wair	22	Goofy	Real Skateboards	Nike
2014	(United States) Wes Kremer	25	Goofy	SK8MAFIA	DC
2015	(United States) Anthony Van Engelen	37	Regular	Fucking Awesome	Vans
2016	(United States) Kyle Walker	22	Goofy	Real Skateboards	Vans
2017	(United States) Jamie Foy	21	Regular	Deathwish Skateboards	Diamond Footwear
2018	(United States) Tyshawn Jones	20	Regular	Fucking Awesome	Adidas
2019	(Argentina) Milton Martinez	28	Goofy	Creature Skateboards	Converse
2020	(United States) Mason Silva	24	Regular	Real Skateboards	Nike
2021	(United States) Mark Suciu	29	Goofy	Habitat Skateboards	Adidas
2022	(United States) Tyshawn Jones (2)	24	Regular	King Skateboards	Adidas
2023	(United States) Miles Silvas	28	Regular	Primitive Skateboarding	Adidas
2024	(United States) Jamie Foy (2)	28	Regular	Deathwish Skateboards	New Balance
2025	(United States) Chris Joslin	29	Regular	Plan B Skateboards	Lakai

== King of the Road ==
From 2003 to 2007, Thrasher held the King of the Road skateboarding competition annually. In the contest, teams of professional skaters are each given "The Book", which contains a series of challenges. Points are awarded at the completion of each challenge. The teams compete at the same time over a two-week period, in which they travel across various American cities to complete as many challenges as possible. Each of these events was released on DVD.

In 2010, Thrasher returned the annual competition, however releasing the episodes via the Thrasher website going forward, instead of on DVD. In 2011, Thrasher and Converse hosted a one-off King of the Road competition in China, with the participation of the four biggest Chinese skateboard deck companies. In 2016, Viceland would acquire the rights to release King of the Road 2015 on its network, and all subsequent King of the Road events going forward. The most recent King of the Road tournament was held in 2017.

In April 2020, Thrasher editor-in-chief Michael Burnett said that Vice's decision to not renew King of the Road for a fourth season, along with the recent passing of previous editor-in-chief Jake Phelps, caused King of the Road to be put on hold, with the intention of it being brought back, possibly in a different format, at a future date.

== Skate Rock ==
Thrasher released a music compilation series titled "Skate Rock" under the High Speed Productions label. Skate Rock was conceptualized by Mofo. The first release was in 1983, with Volume One, and continued until Volume Eight in 1990.

The series focused primarily on punk rock bands, and most of the bands were made up of skateboarders, including well known professionals and community stars such as Steve Caballero, Tony Alva, Bob Denike, Brian Brannon, Mofo, Pushead, Chuck Treece, and Claus Grabke. Of the seven volumes of Skate Rock, all volumes were produced as a cassette available through the magazine. Some volumes were also available as vinyl records.

Thrasher has organized multiple tours throughout the United States and worldwide under the name "Skate Rock".
