= NHS, Inc. =

American sports equipment distribution company

- Type: Private
- Industry: Retail
- Founded: 1973
- Headquarters: Santa Cruz, California, United States
- Products: Apparel; Sporting Equipment
- Website: nhs-inc.com

NHS, Inc. is an American sports equipment distribution company based in Santa Cruz, California. It was founded by Richard Novak, Doug Haut, and Jay Shuirman, three surfer friends from Santa Cruz, California, teamed up to start NHS. The acronym NHS comes from their surname initials. The company distributes the following brands: Santa Cruz Skateboards, Santa Cruz Snowboards, Santa Cruz Surfboards, Creature Skateboards, Independent Truck Company, Bronson Speed Co., Krux Trucks, Ricta Wheels, Mob Grip, OJ Wheels, Road Rider, Slimeballs, Bullet and Nor Cal Clothing Co. NHS formerly owned shares of Santa Cruz Bicycles, also co-founded by Richard Novak, but sold to Pon Holdings in 2015.

The company's main products are skateboard-related, but the company also manufactures snowboarding and surfing equipment.

== History ==
The Santa Cruz Skateboards brand, distributed by NHS, is the oldest continuous skateboard company in the world, founded by Richard Novak, Doug Haut, and Jay Shuirman. At the start, it started as a surfboard business but was struggling to stay afloat because the low profit margins. Soon, a friend from a Hawaiian company challenged NHS to make 500 skateboards. With the surplus of fiberglass lying around they decided to use the stocked materials to fulfill and make skateboards. Their first Santa Cruz skateboard was produced in 1973. The batch of 500 skateboards sold quickly, and a demand for many more boards ensued. The brand would become a staple in the sport.

== Logo and Screaming Hand graphic ==
"Screaming Hand" logo

Additional logo

The company's logo is a red dot with the words "Santa Cruz" written in angular capital letters diagonally across it. A distinctive feature of the logo is the use of a triangle to form the letter 'A'. The logo was designed by Jim Phillips in 1978. In the original version of the logo the red "dot" was elliptical but this was later changed to a circle.

The "Screaming Hand", designed by Jim Phillips Sr. in 1985, is the main graphic associated with the Santa Cruz brand. The hand image has become a skateboarding icon and is recognized widely throughout the skateboarding community; in 2015–16, its 30th anniversary was celebrated with a touring exhibition. As of February 2013, Phillips's son Jimbo also designs artwork for the Santa Cruz brand.

In February 2013, Jeremy Scott showed clothing and accessories at New York Fashion Week that featured designs very similar to the Phillips's on clothing designed by Jeremy Scott. There was an outcry from Santa Cruz artists, as well as the skateboarding sub-culture, and Denike stated:

It's obvious to us, the Phillips family, the fans of Jim Phillips Sr. and Jimbo Phillips, and fans of the brand Santa Cruz Skateboards, as well as many in the global skateboard and skate art community that there is clear and obvious infringement by Mr. Scott.

The matter was settled in September with Scott admitting error and the items being destroyed.
