= Independent Truck Company =

American skateboard truck manufacturer

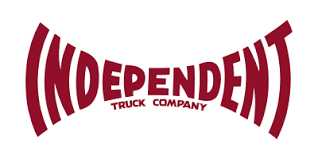
- Independent Truck Company logo since 2022

- Former logo since 1979
- Type: Subsidiary
- Industry: Retail
- Founded: May 23, 1978; 48 years ago in Newark, California, U.S.
- Founders: Richard Novak; Jay Shiurman; Fausto Vitello; Eric Swenson
- Headquarters: Santa Cruz, California, U.S.
- Products: Apparel; Sports equipment
- Number of employees: 14
- Parent: NHS, Inc.
- Website: www.independenttrucks.com

Independent Truck Company is an American skateboard truck manufacturer based in Santa Cruz, California. Established in 1978, the brand is currently owned by NHS, Inc. and has an extended list of sponsored team riders.

== Origin ==
Independent was created by Fausto Vitello and Eric Swenson, along with Richard Novak and Jay Shuirman, in 1978 in Newark, California. Rick Blackhart and Kevin Thatcher were involved in the early stages of production with the company. Blackhart stated that, "one broke, and one didn't turn" in regards to Bennett and Tucker trucks, the largest company producing trucks at the time. The company has become one of the most well-known brands in skateboarding.

== Logo ==
The original logo was designed by Jim Phillips in 1979. Phillips's original vision was based on the "surfer's cross", a variant of the German Iron Cross, due to the connection between surfing and skateboarding. It was initially rejected by others within the company due to the Iron Cross's connection with Nazi Germany. The company did later accept the design following Phillips's insistence, as he notably pointed to the regalia of Pope John Paul II. In 2022, the company changed their logo and publicly distanced themselves from any association with an Iron Cross. The cross logo was brought back in 2026.

== Sources ==
- Denike, Bob (2004). Built to Grind: 25 Years of Hardcore Skateboarding. High Speed Productions. ISBN 9780965727181.
- O'Conner, Paul (2019). Skateboarding and Religion. Springer International Publishing. ISBN 9783030248574.
