= Dave Schubert =

American artist and photographer (1973–2023)

- Born: David T. Schubert; September 9, 1973
- Died: January 5, 2023 (aged 49)
- Occupations: Graffiti artist, photographer
- Known for: photographs of skateboarding and graffiti

David T. Schubert (September 9, 1973 – January 5, 2023) was an American graffiti artist and professional photographer recognized for his photographs of skateboarding and graffiti.

== Life and career ==
Dave Schubert received his first camera when he was six years old, a gift from his father. His father was in the Air Force, resulting in Schubert moving often as a child. As a teen, Schubert started writing graffiti after viewing The Warriors. Inspired by the film, Schubert would skip school to visit New York City, where he started photographing the NYC skate scene at the Brooklyn Banks. In his late teens and early twenties, Schubert established himself as a skilled skate videographer, capturing a lot of footage of skateboarders throughout the east coast of the United States, primarily in Washington, D.C.. Schubert's footage appears in numerous skate videos in the early 90s.

In 1995, Schubert moved to San Francisco to go to school at SFAI after being awarded a scholarship to study photography. Once in California, he began submitting photographs to Slap magazine. Focusing on the graffiti and skateboarding communities in the city, Schubert's images depict San Francisco skateboarding and graffiti of the 1990s and early 2000s. Throughout his life, Schubert maintained an interest in street and underground culture.

Schubert started and published an acclaimed graffiti zine called Graffiti Document. In 2009, after the death of close friend Dash Snow, Schubert created a fanzine of photos of Snow. Schubert's photographs appeared in skateboard magazines, including Thrasher and Slap, and also publications including Mass Appeal, Anthem, Arktip, Purple Magazine, Plaza, and ANP Quarterly.

Schubert exhibited his work locally in San Francisco at the Luggage Store, the Shooting Gallery, Electric Works, the Geary Gallery. Additionally, he exhibited nationally at FUSE and Mudd Guts in NYC, Kavi Gupta in Chicago, and New Image Art in LA. In 2006, Schubert participated in a group art show in Copenhagen, Denmark at V1 Gallery in conjunction with ARKITIP. Schubert's work hung alongside a number of other artists including: CR Stecyk III, Don Pendleton, Ed Templeton, Geoff McFetridge, Harmen Lieburg, Kaws, Ryan Waller, Shepard Fairey, and Space Invader. In 2022, Schubert participated in the "Power of Pablo" charity art show organized by the Pablo Ramirez Foundation, donating a photograph shown alongside other artists including Mark Gonzales, Sean Greene, Haroshi, and others.

Schubert died on January 5, 2023, aged 49.
