= Dirty Ghetto Kids =

American skateboarding business

Dirty Ghetto Kids (DGK)
- Industry: Skateboarding
- Founder: Stevie Williams
- Headquarters: Los Angeles, California,, United States (U.S.)
- Area served: Worldwide
- Key people: Stevie Williams, Josh Kalis, Marcus McBride
- Products: Skateboard hardware and apparel
- Owners: Stevie Williams, Troy Morgan
- Parent: The Kayo Corp

Dirty Ghetto Kids (DGK) is an American skateboard company, producing skateboards and apparel. The brand is distributed by The Kayo Corp, a partnership that was established through Philadelphia professional skateboarder Stevie Williams and Troy Morgan of The Kayo Corp.

== History ==
As part of the "Est." segment on the Berrics website, Williams revealed in 2012 that the idea of DGK "really came out of nowhere", further explaining that the company was built upon the Gold skateboard wheels brand that he co-owned with his good friend Eli Soto. Williams stated in the interview that the "Dirty Ghetto Kids" name was thought of fairly immediately, elaborating that he "didn't really second-guess", as it was what he "really wanted to do". Williams also explained that he created a brand that was consciously different from the expectations that preceded the official launch, such as the rumor that Williams was going to only recruit African-American skateboarders.

In September 2009, the recruitment of Williams's close friend and skateboarding partner Josh Kalis was announced. Kalis, formerly of the Alien Workshop brand, skated together with Williams during the 1990s in Philadelphia at the LOVE Park location. Both Kalis and Williams filmed often with William Strobeck. Their skateboarding during the period was documented in numerous videos, including the ON Video series, Transworld SKATEboarding's The Reason.

In December 2010, Rodrigo Teixeira announced his departure from Flip Skateboards and the official statement from the company read: "Everyone at Flip would like to thank Rodrigo for all the good times and wish him all the best for the future." Teixeira subsequently joined the roster of DGK and explained his decision in a January 2011 interview: "I feel like it was time for me to make a move and do what I wanted to do. With DGK we are into the same things. We can all kick it and skate at the same spot. It's just more who I am."

DGK collaborated with the Zero Skateboards company, founded and owned by professional skateboarder Jamie Thomas, in mid 2011 on the "Fresh 'Til Death" project. The two companies completed a U.S. tour together and released products—the Zero "Dirty" and the "Dirty Zero Kids" series of skateboard decks—following the tour. The collaboration was the result of an airplane conversation between Kalis and Thomas in early 2011.

Williams announced the establishment of the "Da Playground" indoor training facility in 2011—the facility is located in Atlanta, Georgia, and its main purpose is to provide a location for the DGK team to skate. However, footage that has been filmed inside the facility has also featured non-DGK skateboarders.

Williams spoke with The Wall Street Journal in July 2012 to promote the expansion of the brand into the Macy's department store chain. In response to a question regarding the financial growth that follows the expansion, Williams explained:

My personal goal is, like, I want my son and daughter to be old enough that their still around to where they can remember that, you know, daddy's company DGK is, like, on the billboards, or maybe commercials on TV, and, you know, those are the things that I like to pride myself on. Because I can tell them, "Once upon a time" stories that were real, but can actually let them know that you can defy adversity.

The world premiere of the Parental Advisory full-length video was held at The Avalon in Hollywood, California, on December 11, 2012. Prior to the screening, the DGK team was given custom DGK pinky rings made by Ben Baller, and Juicy J and Trinidad James performed music afterwards. The retail release of the video occurred on December 14, 2012. Following the release of Parental Advisory, the majority of the DGK squad filmed a "United Nations" segment for the Berrics website, and Keelan Dadd was assigned professional status after five years with the company.

Williams explained the ethos of both himself and DGK in a 2013 interview with the European skateboard publication, Kingpin—the importance of fun, friendship, and community is highlighted:

I like reminiscing about the things that made me psyched on skating as a kid, it helps me go out there and keep doing it. The problem with most videos these days is that they just show how challenging skateboarding is, rather than showing how fun it is. I don't have time for that shit. It feels like they are going too far, we've got to go back in time ... It just doesn't look fun anymore. I think that's why the DGK video was so successful. We would go out all together, skate the same spots and you can actually see that we are having a bunch of fun.

Boo Johnson and Marquise Henry were announced as the newest professionals on the DGK team in July 2014. A video to commemorate their new status was released on July 18, 2014. It was widely regarded as one of the best videos of 2014.

=== "Free Fabes" campaign ===
On October 5, 2012, DGK launched the "Free Fabes" campaign to raise legal fees for Williams's close friend and former professional skateboarder, Fabian Alomar. A member of the now-defunct brand, Menace, Alomar was arrested and detained on a drug possession charge and faced a lengthy sentence due to California's "3-strike" legislation. Williams appeared in a video segment, alongside Alomar, to promote the campaign. An unseen video part from Alomar, filmed during the height of his career, was published on the internet as part of the campaign.

== Awards ==
The DGK team was selected for the "Best Team" award at the 15th Annual Transworld SKATEboarding Awards. It's produced by Transworld SKATEboarding magazine; the award followed a sixteen-page feature in its April 2012 issue.

They created a full-length video Parental Advisory, in which every team member contributed a full video part (DGK was nominated alongside the Element and Chocolate teams). The 2012 DGK video Parental Advisory was also nominated in the "Best Video" category.

== Team ==
Professional

- Stevie Williams
- Dane Vaughn
- Josh Kalis
- John Shanahan
- Marcus McBride
- Chaz Ortiz
- Boo Johnson
- Kevin Bilyeu
- Dwayne Fagundes
- Lenny Rivas
- Jack Curtin

Former team riders

- Rodrigo Teixeira
- Wade Desarmo
- Rodrigo Lima
- Anthony Williams

== Videography ==
- Kayo Corp Promo (2004)
- It's Official (2006)
- Fresh 'til Death – collaboration with Zero (2011)
- Da Playground (2011)
- Parental Advisory (2012)
- Blood Money (2014)
- SAVED (2017)
- Zeitgeist (2022)
- Amen (2024)

== See also ==
- Expedition-One Skateboards
- Organika Skateboards
- Gold Wheels
