= Hill bomb =

Skateboard trick

A hill bomb is a maneuver in skateboarding in which a rider rides down a big hill. The trick is noted for its particular danger and, sometimes, grace.

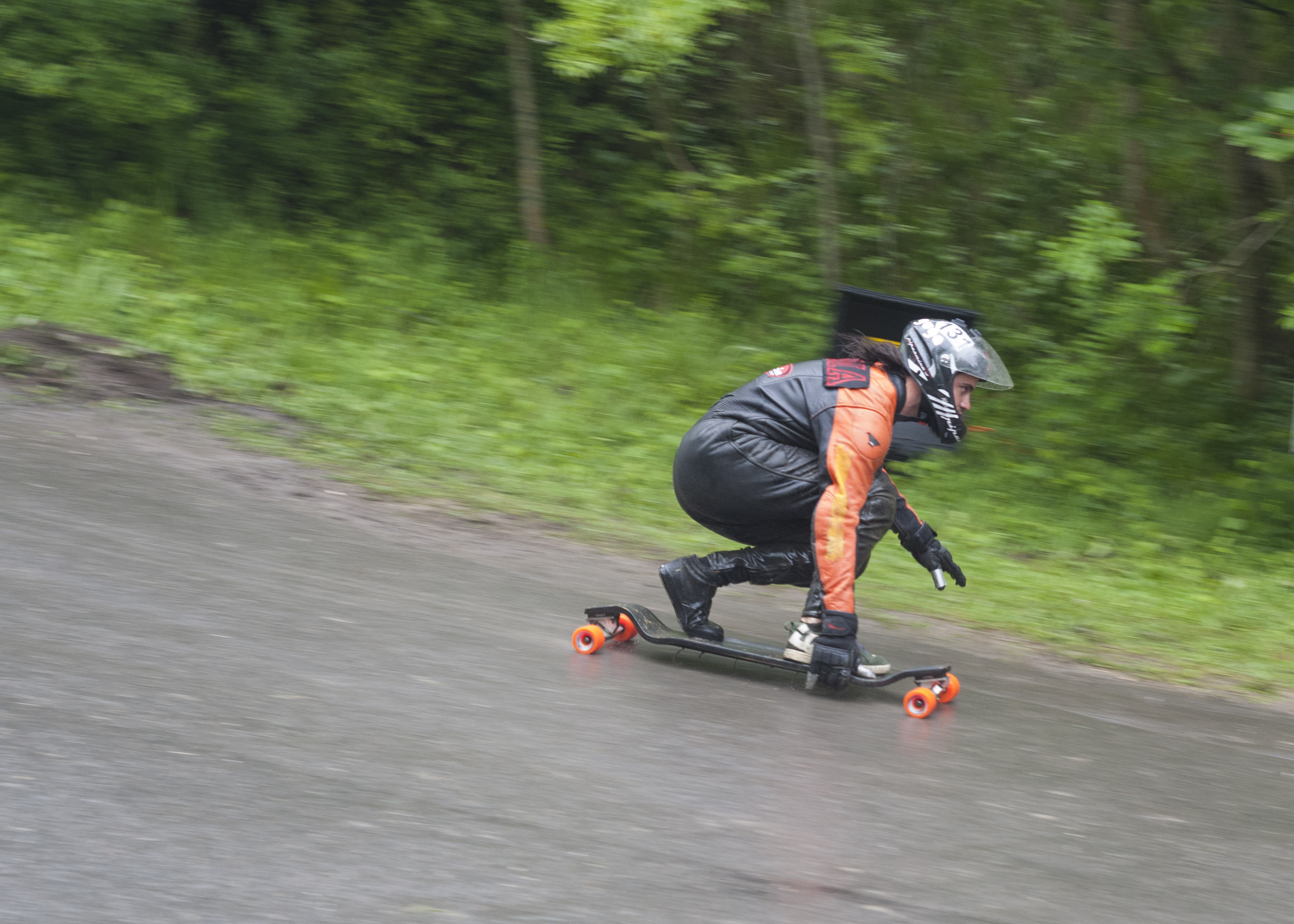
A photograph of a skater performing a hill bomb on a longboard

== History ==
Thrasher magazine refers to hill bombing as "one of the first thrills ever on a skateboard." Hill bombs are dangerous and should only be attempted by highly skilled skateboarders. Sean Greene, Pablo Ramirez, Frank Gerwer, GX1000, and others have repopularized hill bombing in the mid- to late 2010s.

=== 1980s ===
In the 1985 Powell Peralta Skate video Future Primitive, Tommy Guerrero skates down the hills of San Francisco, using the steep landscape of the city in ways previously unseen. In the 1988 skate video Sick Boys, skaters, in particular Julien Stranger, skate down the steep streets of San Francisco.

=== 1990s ===
In Toy Machine's 1998 skate video—Jump Off A Building—Chris Senn's part contains a number of hill bombs.

=== 2000s ===
At the end of Jon Allie's part in the 2005 Zero skateboards video "New Blood," he does a frontside 180 kickflip to hill bomb. In the 2005 DVS skate video Skate More Dennis Busenitz incorporates a number of hill bombs into his part.

=== 2010s ===
In 2010, Emerica released the skate video Stay Gold featuring a part by Brandon Westgate that contains a hill bomb down a drainage ditch. In 2011, Magenta skateboards released SF Hill Street Blues filmed by Yoan Taillandier which features many San Francisco hill bombs. In the 2011, Emerica released a video: Brandon Westgate: New Shoe, New Part which contains a number of hill bomb lines filmed in San Francisco. The GX1000 videos are known to contain gnarly hill bombing, including the 2017: Adrenaline Junkie and the 2018 Roll Up and El Camino. In the 2019 Supreme video CANDYLAND - dedicated to Pablo Ramirez and directed by William Strobeck - a number of hill bombs are featured, including ones by Sean Greene, Jeff Carlyle, Rowan Zorilla, Matt Finley, Sean Pablo, Andrew Torralvo, Taylor Nida, and Elissa Steamer.

=== San Francisco ===
Due to its hilly nature, San Francisco, California, is known to be a particularly good city in which to bomb hills.

==== Dolores Park hill bomb ====
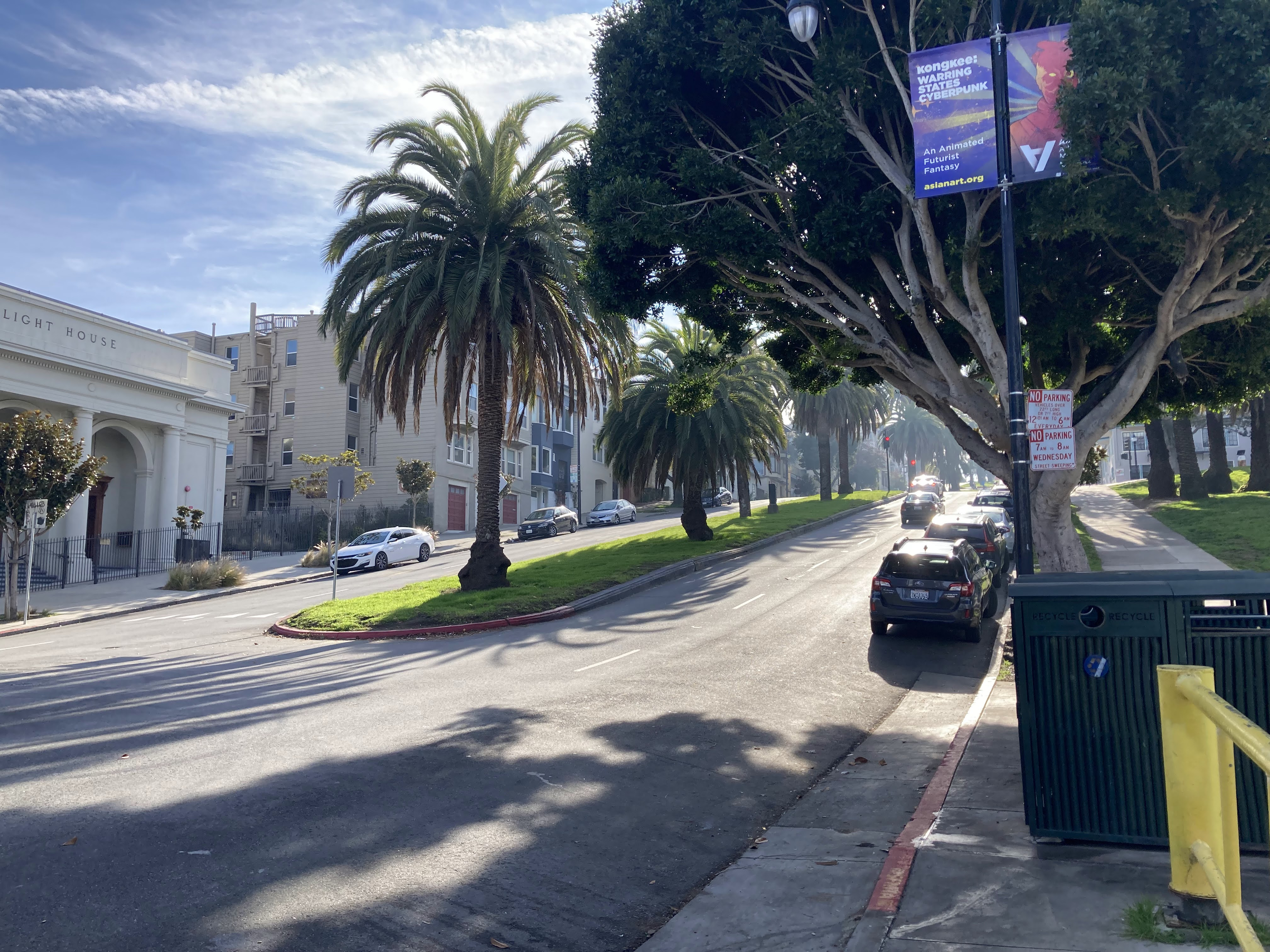
Dolores Street where the annual Dolores Hill Bomb event takes place.

In July in San Francisco, California, hundreds of skateboarders gather on Dolores Street across from Dolores Park for an impromptu hill bombing event. The event has become an annual tradition. There have been some injuries and at least one death associated with the event. The city attempted to stop the event from happening by installing Botts dots in 2020. However, skaters returned anyway in spite of those.
