= Keith Hufnagel =

American skateboarder and fashion designer (1974–2020)

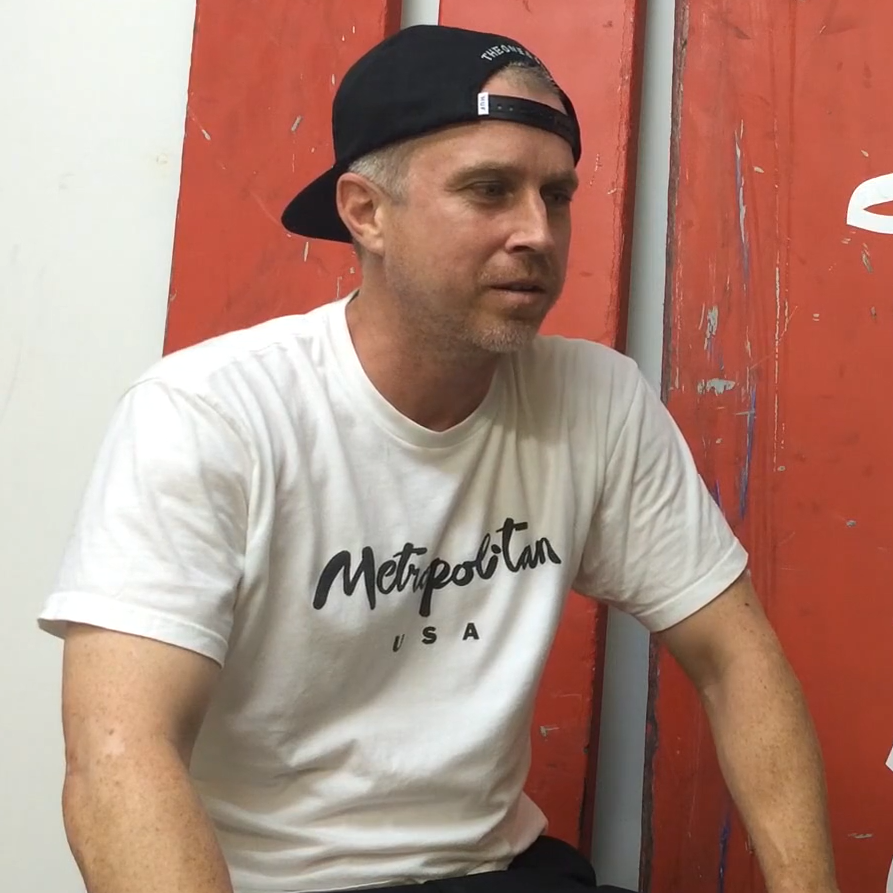
- Hufnagel in 2016

Personal information
- Born: January 21, 1974 New York, New York, U.S.
- Died: September 24, 2020 (aged 46) Los Angeles, California, U.S.
- Occupations: Skateboarder, fashion designer

Sport
- Turned pro: 1993

Keith Hufnagel (January 21, 1974 – September 24, 2020) was an American skateboarding professional, entrepreneur, and fashion designer, the founder of the streetwear brand HUF.

== Early life ==
Hufnagel was born in Manhattan, where he grew up in Stuyvesant Town–Peter Cooper Village; his father was a vice president of Metropolitan Life Insurance and his mother a nurse. He attended Xavier High School on a track scholarship. After graduating from high school in 1992, he attended San Francisco State University but dropped out after one semester to become a professional skateboarder.

== Career ==
=== Skateboarding ===
Hufnagel began his skateboarding career in his teens in New York City, at the Brooklyn Banks, an expanse of steep brick slopes and staircases under the Brooklyn Bridge. He turned pro in California in 1993, first joining Fun Skateboards and then signing with Jim Thiebaud of Real Skateboards; he also skated for Thunder Trucks and Spitfire Wheels.

=== Fashion ===
After living for a couple of years in Los Angeles, he opened the first HUF Worldwide store in the Tenderloin neighborhood of San Francisco in 2002 with his then wife, Anne Freeman, at her suggestion using the nickname he had already used on his skateboard decks and T-shirts. A pioneer of streetwear, it carried rare sneakers and clothing by Supreme and other boutique fashion houses, and also art by other skateboarders and artists such as Aaron Rose and Haroshi. The boutique expanded into a chain based in Los Angeles and with stores in Texas, New York, and several in Japan, and by 2007 to a lifestyle brand, selling activewear labeled with an "H" plus in some cases an irreverent collection motto such as "Dirtbag Crew" or "Fuck It". A sculpture by Haroshi of a raised middle finger, in the company's Los Angeles store, was destroyed in the protests following George Floyd's murder by police; Hufnagel responded by producing a T-shirt to benefit the Black Lives Matter movement.

HUF products included limited-edition apparel related to bands, cartoon characters, and brands. Hufnagel himself, one of the first skaters to have a shoe with his name on it, from his sponsor DVS, also designed limited-edition shoes including the Nike Dunks and the Nike Air Max 90 HUFquakes. HUF footwear included the Classic and a controversial signature shoe for Dylan Rieder.

In late 2017, Hufnagel sold the HUF brand to TSI Holdings; Eddie Miyoshi became CEO the following year. In 2019 Hufnagel decided to focus on apparel, producing shoes only in collaboration with other brands.

He revived the 1990s company Metropolitan as a "garage project" in 2017 and for it created an Adidas ZX 8000.

Hufnagel skated for the HUF Worldwide team. His career was featured in a three-part series on the Vice Media show Epicly Later'd.

== Personal ==
Hufnagel married Anne Freeman in 2001; the marriage ended in divorce, but she remained involved in the HUF business until 2013. He remarried to Mariellen Hufnagel; they have two children.

He died of brain cancer at his home in Los Angeles in September 2020, at the age of 46.

== Filmography ==
- 411VM: Issue 3 (1993)
- Real: Kicked Out Of Everywhere (1999)
- 411VM: Around The World (2002)
- Chomp On This (2002)
- DVS: Skate More (2005)
- Krooked: Kronichles (2006)
- DVS: Catching Up With Keith (2007)
- Real: Since Day One (2011)
- Supreme: "cherry" (2014)
