= Pablo Ramirez (skateboarder) =

American skateboarder (1993–2019)

Personal information
- Full name: Pablo Ramirez
- Nickname: psplifff
- Born: February 10, 1993 Astoria, Queens, New York, U.S.
- Died: April 23, 2019 (aged 26) San Francisco, California, U.S.
- Website: psplifff - Instagram pabloramirez.org

Sport
- Sport: Skateboarding

Pablo Ramirez (February 10, 1993 – April 23, 2019) was a regular-footed American skateboarder, artist, and musician from New York City, who lived and skated in San Francisco.

== Life ==
Ramirez was raised in Park Slope, Brooklyn where he lived primarily with his mother, a chef and business owner of Jewish American descent. His father, who is of Dominican descent, worked as a lawyer. Pablo went to elementary, middle, and high school in Brooklyn, NY, where he developed a love for the arts, sports, and music. As a child he enjoyed spending time with friends, camping, and playing the drums. His father was very involved in his upbringing from spending time after school to do homework, teaching him to play chess, and spending weekends playing on ice hockey teams. His father took Pablo on many trips, especially to the Dominican Republic to visit family. In April, 2019, his father took Pablo's grandmother to San Francisco where they attended Pablo's art opening. His father exposed him to various types of music, including a mutual favorite: The Clash. Pablo would spend time with his father in Manhattan, where the latter lives.

=== Skateboarding ===
A few years after graduating high school, Ramirez moved to San Francisco from New York City. Pablo honed his skills in San Francisco, becoming a loved member of the San Francisco skateboarding community. In 2016, he appeared in the skate video Awaysted put out by Western World and filmed by Adam Anorga and Zane Timpson. In 2017, Pablo appeared in the video Adrenaline Junkie by GX1000. Ramirez, known for his fast skating and fearless outlook, rode down the steepest streets in San Francisco. Additionally, he volunteered with Shawn Connolly's organization, San Francisco Skate Club, mentoring teens.

The 2019 Supreme video CANDYLAND directed by William Strobeck is dedicated to Pablo Ramirez. Ramirez also has the opening line in the video. In October 2019, Zane Timpson, Adam Anorga, and Layla Venegas released "He's in the Green" a video tribute to Pablo.

The 2020 Westernworld video FFFURTHER by Anorga & Timpson is dedicated to Pablo. The video features skating from Elijah Akerley, Matt Bergmann, Stephen Brayman, Hayden Estrada, Kayl Johnson, Neil Norgren, Daniel Stelly, Zane Timpson, and Pablo.

==== Skate video parts ====
- 2016: Awaysted - Westernworld
- 2017: Adrenaline Junkie - GX1000
- 2018: Roll Up - GX1000
- 2018: El Camino - GX1000
- 2019: CANDYLAND - Supreme - by William Strobeck
- 2019: He's in the Green - by Zane Timpson, Adam Anorga, and Layla Venegas
- 2020: FFFURTHER - Westernworld - by Anorga & Timpson

== Death ==
Ramirez died in a crash with a truck on 7th Street in San Francisco's South of Market area while commuting on his skateboard. KGO-TV reported, "Just seconds before he died in a crash with a truck in San Francisco's South of Market area, video shows pro skateboarder Pablo 'P-Spliff' Ramirez grabbing the bumper of a truck and being towed through a busy intersection."

== Pablo Ramirez Foundation ==
Pablo's family established the Pablo Ramirez Foundation or (PRF) in his honor with the aim to help kids and young adults develop a positive lifestyle through skateboarding, music and art. Since its founding, the Pablo Ramirez Foundation has hosted public skateboarding events in New York City and San Francisco. In March 2022, the Pablo Ramirez Foundation presented "The Power of Pablo" a benefit art exhibit with a live musical performance by Tommy Guerrero and DJ set by John Cardiel. The 2022 "Power of Pablo" art show included over 100 artists including Alicia McCarthy, Mark Gonzales, Barry McGee, Ed Templeton, Kevin Long, Elyse Gil, Sean Greene, William Strobeck, Haroshi, Ryan Garshell, Alán González, Nile Gibbs, Jahmal Williams, Jack Curtin, Jeffrey Cheung, Ashley Reem Habr, Roger Krebs, Dave Schubert, and others.
