= Zane Timpson =

American artist and skateboarder (1995–2021)

Zane Cary Timpson (July 13, 1995 - November 13, 2021) was an American skateboarder and artist.

== Skateboarding ==
In 2016, Timpson and Adam Anorga released a skate video titled Awaysted through their "Western World" company. The video was filmed by Anorga and Timpson.

In 2016, Zane Timpson nose-picked into the bank at the Encinitas City Hall. In Feb/Mar 2025, A photo of the trick appeared on the cover of Encinitas Magazine.

In October 2019, Timpson, Adam Anorga, and Layla Venegas released "He's in the Green" a video tribute to Pablo Ramirez.

The 2020 Westernworld video FFFURTHER by Anorga & Timpson is also dedicated to Pablo Ramirez. The video features skating from Elijah Akerley, Matt Bergmann, Stephen Brayman, Hayden Estrada, Kayl Johnson, Neil Norgren, Daniel Stelly, Timpson, and Pablo.

In a 2020 interview with Confusion magazine in issue 27, Timspon is asked by interviewer Jonathan Hay "Is skateboarding a sport?", Zane replies: "Nah, this shit is a violent ballet. It’s dangerous art."

Timpson loved to hill bomb the streets of San Francisco. His passion for skating the hills of San Francisco was featured in a 2021 New Yorker article.

In December 2024, the "bruce time" video by mohkie from Isaac Eteminan included unreleased footage of Timpson skating.

=== Skate Videography ===
- 2016: Awaysted - Westernworld
- 2019: He's in the Green - by Zane Timpson, Adam Anorga, and Layla Venegas
- 2020: FFFURTHER - Westernworld - by Anorga & Timpson
- 2024: "bruce time" - by mohkie from Isaac Eteminan

== Education ==
Timpson was a cinema major at San Francisco State University.
