= Sean Pablo =

American skateboarder, designer, photographer, and model

- Born: Sean Pablo Murphy; August 30, 1997 (age 28); Silver Lake, California, U.S.
- Occupations: Skateboarder, designer, model, musician, photographer
- Website: paradise.nyc

Sean Pablo Murphy (born August 30, 1997), known as Sean Pablo, is a regular-footed American skateboarder, designer, model, musician, and photographer.

== Early life ==
Born in Silver Lake, California to Brendan Murphy, a father of Irish descent, and Carolina Argueta, a mother of Salvadoran descent. Pablo first started skateboarding at the age of 10 after his father, a surfer and skateboarder, encouraged him to pick up the sport. Sean Pablo was homeschooled for a portion of high school by his father, while his mother worked as a teacher.

== Professional career ==
Pablo and his friends, Aidan Mackey and Sage Elsesser, spent their time replicating the style and fashion of notable 90s skateboarders such as Jason Dill, and the late Dylan Rieder. Eventually gaining the attention of the staff at Supreme, which included Dill, and filmer William Strobeck. He would then be signed as an amateur to Dill's Fucking Awesome brand. Pablo then landed a role in the first feature length Supreme video Cherry which eventually led to signing a deal with Converse.

Since 2023, Pablo has led the EDGLRD skateboarding team with Harmony Korine.

== Paradise NYC ==
Following the success of his skateboarding career Pablo founded the clothing brand Paradise NYC in 2015. The brand is stocked at many stores including Supreme, and Dover Street Market's various locations.
