= OG Ma =

Chinese-Canadian businesswoman

Lam Xie, best known as OG Ma, is a Chinese-American fashion enthusiast and businesswoman. Being described as the "mother of streetwear", she is best known for running the Unique Hype Collection store, which sells streetwear apparel in Chinatown, Manhattan.

== Biography ==
Xie grew up in China. From Shenzhen, she moved to New York City in 1992 with her two sons to reunite with their families and worked as a babysitter. She received a business degree in the United States.

Xie began the business when her son Peter started collecting and selling Supreme clothing, and opened a shop in 2006. Their shop was profiled in the New Yorker in 2013, and is often visited by celebrities.
