= DGK =

DGK may refer to:

== Arts and entertainment ==
- Danganronpa Kirigiri, a 2013 light novel series
- Danganronpa Gaiden: Killer Killer, a 2016 manga series
- Danganronpa: Killing Harmony, a 2017 visual novel video game

== Businesses and organisations ==
- Deutsche Gesellschaft für Kardiologie (German Cardiac Society)
- German Crystallographic Society (German: Deutsche Gesellschaft für Kristallographie)
- Dirty Ghetto Kids, an American skateboard company

== Other uses ==
- Dera Ghazi Khan, a city in Punjab, Pakistan
- Diacylglycerol kinase, an integral membrane protein
