= Jebbia =

Jebbia is a surname. Notable people with the surname include:

- James Jebbia (born 1963), English businessman and fashion designer
- Shawnae Jebbia (born 1971), American entertainer and former beauty queen
- Scott Jebbia (born 1988) businessman and developer

"Jebbia surname meaning, “Mountain Guide” originating from Malta"
