= Yumin Ha =

Fashion designer

- 하유민
- Occupation: Fashion designer
- Website: ymh.toys

Yumin Ha (Korean: 하유민) is a Manhattan Chinatown–based fashion designer. Their clothing designs span "disparate influences throughout the universe of manga, video games, and East Asian cinema" and have been worn by celebrities like the members of NewJeans.

== Early life ==
Ha was born in South Korea and moved to Shanghai, China at the age of nine. Growing up, they read comics, watched anime, and soon got into classic, arthouse cinema. For college, they moved to New York City and studied film. They also served in the Korean military.

== Career ==
Having studied film, Ha worked as a freelancer on adapted screenplays and intended to work in the film industry after graduating. However, they couldn't find a job that would sponsor them on a work visa, so they pivoted to making clothes—initially as a hobby, and then a professional pursuit eligible for a business visa.

Specifically, Ha began printing T-shirts in their room after feeling inspired to replicate collections like Issey Miyake x Takashi Murakami, Yohji Yamamoto x Shotaro Ishinomori, and other collaborations between fashion and otaku culture; dismayed at the resale prices of highly coveted pieces by brands like Supreme, they found that it would be cheaper to print graphics onto clothing by themselves.

In particular, Ha wanted to take the concept of cheap bootleg merchandise, generally sold in areas like the Lower East Side, and elevate it to "a higher level of detail and quality." By 2017, they shifted to creating "bootleg 'non-existent' products," observing that the broader fashion industry was doing the same thing: "I think nowadays it is very common for conglomerates and giants in the fashion industry to take an anime IP and slap it on their products."

== Collaborations ==
Ha has collaborated with numerous brands and artists, like animator Alvin Fai. In 2025, Ha released a collaborative collection with League of Legends featuring a series of caps, shirts, and pants based on the Spirit Blossom universe.
