= Fancy Lad =

Fancy Lad is a skateboard collective and company known for its creative skate videos and non-traditional construction of skateboards. The group often skates in improvised spots around Boston. The group's "board manipulations", or modified skateboards, include Abe "Orange Man" Dubin's yard sale snow scooter with attached skateboard wheels.

Their skate videos were featured on Adult Swim's Web Experiments. Their 52-minute "Is This Skateboarding" debuted on Thrasher Magazine. Fancy Lad owner Nick Murray has credited their low production quality skate video aesthetic to his interest in B films and referred to the group as "merry pranksters" more interested in creativity than mainstream perfection. Their videos often cut to clips from Murray's VHS collection and often feature "board manipulations", costumes, and Simpsons references. Fancy Lad's choice to shoot on analog tape, in which the time for each shot is limited, often produces a rawer result than traditional skate films. Their videos show skaters struggling to land a trick and the skate crew's excitement after it takes a skater hours to land a trick.
