= Don Pendleton (artist) =

American artist and designer (born 1970)

Don Pendleton (born 1970 in Ravenswood, West Virginia) is an American artist and designer. Pendleton is most widely recognized for the large body of skateboard graphics and for the artwork of Pearl Jam's tenth studio album, Lightning Bolt.

== Life and work ==
Don Pendleton grew up in Ravenswood, a rural town in West Virginia, two miles from Ripley. Influenced by his father, he started focusing on art at an early age. During Don's teen years, he was introduced to skateboarding and fell in love with it.

Pendleton graduated from Marshall University (Huntington, WV) in 1994 with a BFA in Graphic Design. In 1998, Don took a position with Alien Workshop skateboards in Dayton, OH. Pendleton created the majority of the companies graphics between the years of 1998 and 2005.

In 2006, Don accepted a position at Element Skateboards as graphic artist /designer and continued with skateboard graphics, logo, and T-shirt design as well as packaging and marketing for the brand.

In 2008 Pendleton was the subject of a documentary entitled, 'Little Giants'.

Pendleton left Element Skateboards in 2009 to focus on freelance art, painting, and design. His work ended up on the cover of Juxtapoz Magazine in June, 2012 with a feature on his work and interview.

He has produced signature collaborative products with companies such as Volcom, Oakley, Stance Socks, The Hundreds, Mountain Dew, Logitech and has worked with the most popular companies in skateboarding and action sports.

Pendleton released a book of art in 2014 featuring 15 years of illustrations, entitled "Limerence". He also worked with Poster Child Prints who publish limited edition screen prints of his work.

In 2024 Pendelton worked with Blenko Glass Company to design art glass in the shape of an owl.

== Exhibitions and awards ==
In 2014, Pendleton had his first solo museum exhibit at the Huntington Museum of Art entitled, 'Fine Lines,' which was an examination and discussion of fine art vs. commercial art and skateboard graphics. There was also a 3-day workshop and public presentation as part of the exhibit.

Recently Pendleton won a Grammy Award for Best Recording Package in January 2015 for his artwork on the Lightning Bolt album cover and illustrations, sharing the win with Jeff Ament, Eddie Vedder, and Joe Spix.

== Influence ==
Pendleton has been influenced by the skateboard culture and graphics he grew up with. Artists like Neil Blender, Mark Gonzales, and Natas Kaupas were an integral part of his tastes. Later on, he was exposed to artists such as Picasso, Marc Chagall, Kandinsky and Miro and became a big fan of cubism, abstract modern and minimalist artwork. He has also mentioned being influenced by literature, architecture, insects and animals.
