= William Strobeck =

American filmmaker (born 1978)

- Born: William Prentice Strobeck; March 17, 1978 (age 48); Syracuse, New York, U.S.
- Occupations: Filmmaker; director; videographer
- Years active: 1997–present
- Website: williamstrobeck.com

William Strobeck (born March 17, 1978) is an American filmmaker, director, videographer, and photographer based in New York City. Strobeck directed the skate videos cherry (2014), BLESSED (2018), CANDYLAND (2019), STALLION (2021), and PLAY DEAD (2022).

== Early life ==
Born in Syracuse, New York to a single mother, Strobeck grew up with his grandmother, mother, and other family members. His mother was diagnosed with schizophrenia when Will was growing up, which resulted in her absence for a time. Strobeck moved around, living with different family members, until his mother found proper treatment. After receiving treatment and reentering his life, Strobeck's mother encouraged his creativity and freedom. Strobeck describes the void left by his mother's partial absence in his childhood as having a strong influence on his creativity.

== Filmmaking ==
As a young teenager in the 1990s, Strobeck first started filming his friends outside the Everson Museum of Art in the center of Syracuse. At the time, the museum considered skating an art form and allowed the skaters to skate the plaza in front of it.

In 1996, Strobeck moved to Philadelphia at the age of 17. Strobeck filmed skateboarding during the Love Park skate scene from 1997 until 2003. As the popularity of the Philadelphia skateboard scene grew, Alien Workshop offered Strobeck a daily retainer to be a skate videographer for the company. By 1998, Strobeck had quit community college and was doing deliveries to work on the Alien Workshop video Photosynthesis full time. In 2004, Strobeck self-funded a day in the life film starring Mark Gonzales and Jason Dill, titled DIZZY.

In 2006, Strobeck directed McBeth - Mark Gonzales - The Journal, No. 17 - starring Mark Gonzales, running 12 minutes and released with Krooked Skateboards.

In 2009, Strobeck worked with Gonz and Jason Schwartzman on the music video for "Any Fun" by Schwartzman's Coconut Records solo project.

Strobeck produced a section for TransWorld's The Cinematographer Project (2012), with Jason Dill, Danny Garcia, Austyn Gillette, Mark Gonzales, Jake Johnson, Alex Olson, and Dylan Rieder.

In 2012, Strobeck released a short film, "My Lovely Mess," featuring Chris Kennedy, Lizzi Bougatsos, Chloë Sevigny, Lily Ludlow, Stacy Strobeck, Tara Subkoff, David Clark, Alex Olson, Lil' Naomi, and Natasha Lyonne. "My Lovely Mess" was described by one reviewer as "haunting but often very funny."

Also in 2012, Strobeck began filming his first feature-length video for Supreme called Cherry. cherry was released in 2014, featuring a large variety of skaters in a series of montages accompanied by two parts, one by Paulo Diaz and one shared part by Dylan Rieder and Alex Olson. Cherry, Supreme's first skate video in almost 20 years, received positive reviews from fans and critics.

In 2015, Strobeck released "the red devil" produced by Supreme, filmed in New York and Los Angeles, featuring Kevin Bradley, Jason Dill, Sage Elsesser, Tyshawn Jones, Aidan Mackey, Alex Olson, Sean Pablo, Na-Kel Smith, and Anthony Van Engelen.

In 2015, Strobeck released SICKNESS, a joint Supreme and Thrasher release set in the San Francisco Bay Area, featuring Aidan Mackey, Sean Pablo, Sage Elsesser, Tyshawn Jones, and Kevin Bradley.

In 2016, Strobeck released Pussy Gangster, a 10-minute collaboration with Supreme featuring Kevin Bradley, Sage Elsesser, Ben Kadow, Tyshawn Jones, Sean Pablo, Na-Kel Smith, and others.

In 2016, Strobeck released KING PUPPY, a 5-minute collaboration with Supreme and Nike SB, featuring Kevin Bradley, Sage Elsesser, Eric Koston, Sean Pablo, and Grant Taylor.

In 2018, Strobeck released the 84-minute-long BLESSED, also through the Supreme brand studio. BLESSED features 2018 SOTY Tyshawn Jones, Ben Kadow, Aidan Mackey, Sean Pablo, Vincent Touzery, Jason Dill, Kevin Bradley, Mark Gonzales, Na-Kel Smith, Sage Elsesser, and others.

In 2019, Supreme (in collaboration with San Francisco-based skate crew GX1000) and Strobeck released CANDYLAND, a feature-length skate video dedicated to Pablo Ramirez.

In March 2021, Strobeck released STALLION, another feature-length video filmed in Milan to coincide with the opening of Supreme's Milan store.

In November 2021, Strobeck released MIND GOBLIN, a 20-minute video filmed in Berlin featuring Tyshawn Jones, Sage Elsesser, Kader Sylla, Ben Kadow, Vincent Touzery, and others.

== Fine art ==
In November 2019, Strobeck held his first exhibition, My Lovely Mess, at Milk Gallery in New York. The show featured large-scale photographs and memorabilia alongside projections of his Supreme skate videos, including cherry, BLESSED, and CANDYLAND. The gallery walls were covered in Strobeck's tweets, and a photograph of actor Chloë Sevigny was displayed at the center of the space.

A full-scale replica of Strobeck's East Village apartment stood at the center of the exhibition. It was filled with skate decks, magazines, books, and VHS tapes from Strobeck's personal collection. The original apartment was the setting for his portraits of subjects such as model Camille Rowe, skateboarder Tyshawn Jones, and Dylan Rieder.

== Personal life ==
Strobeck moved to New York City in 2003 and has lived in the East Village since the early 2010s.

== Filmography ==
Year	Title	Videographer	Director	Producer	Notes
1999	Transworld: The Reason	Yes			Starring Stevie Williams
2000	Photosynthesis	Yes			Alien Workshop; directed by Joe Castrucci; Strobeck filmed Jason Dill's part
2000	Anthony Pappalardo - I.E	Yes			Starring Anthony Pappalardo
2003	Mosaic	Yes			Habitat Skateboards
2003	The DC Video	Yes			DC Shoes
2004	Dizzy	Yes	Yes	Yes	Starring Mark Gonzales and Jason Dill
2006	Mcbeth	Yes	Yes		Starring Mark Gonzales; released with Krooked Skateboards
2008	Smile on Wry Boy	Yes	Yes	Yes	
2008	Pigeon	Yes	Yes	Yes	
2008	Clusterfuck	Yes	Yes	Yes	
2009	Mind Field	Yes			Filmed Dylan Rieder's part
2010	Circle Board in NYC	Yes	Yes	Yes	
2010	Skin	Yes	Yes	Yes	
2011	Sister	Yes	Yes	Yes	
2012	Swallow "If You Can"	Yes	Yes	Yes	
2012	Homeboy (We Still Here)	Yes	Yes	Yes	
2012	Scooters	Yes	Yes	Yes	
2012	The Cinematographer Project ("STUD")	Yes	Yes	Yes	TransWorld; Strobeck produced a section
2012	Buddy	Yes	Yes	Yes	Supreme
2014	cherry	Yes	Yes	Yes	Supreme; full length
2014	Joyride/Sex Kitten	Yes	Yes	Yes	Supreme
2015	FIGHT/FUCK II THE MOVIE	Yes	Yes	Yes	
2015	The Red Devil	Yes	Yes	Yes	Supreme
2015	SICKNESS	Yes	Yes	Yes	Supreme and Thrasher
2015	SWOOSH	Yes	Yes	Yes	Supreme
2016	Pussy Gangster	Yes	Yes	Yes	Supreme
2016	KING PUPPY	Yes	Yes	Yes	Supreme and Nike SB
2017	The Fat Kid	Yes	Yes	Yes	
2017	Hockey - II	Yes	Yes	Yes	
2018	BLESSED	Yes	Yes	Yes	Supreme; full length; Tyshawn Jones Thrasher SOTY part
2018	KILLER	Yes	Yes	Yes	
2019	CANDYLAND	Yes	Yes	Yes	Supreme; full length; dedicated to Pablo Ramirez
2021	STALLION	Yes	Yes	Yes	Supreme; full length; filmed in Milan
2021	Mind Goblin	Yes	Yes	Yes	Supreme; full length; filmed in Berlin
