= Nika Washington =

American skateboarder & artist

Personal information
- Nickname: "Neex"
- Born: August 24, 1991 (age 34) Inglewood, California, U.S.

Sport
- Country: United States
- Sport: Skateboarding

Nika "Neex" Washington (born August 24, 1991) is a goofy-footed American skateboarder from Inglewood, California. Washington was featured in the all-female skate video "Quit Your Day Job."

== Biography ==
=== Skateboarding ===
Washington began skating at 14 years. In 2016, she was featured in "Quit Your Day Job." In 2019, Washington placed first in the inaugural Women's Damn Am skateboard competition.
