= Josh Kalis =

American skateboarder (born 1976)

- Born: April 27, 1976 (age 49); Grand Rapids, Michigan, U.S.
- Occupation: Professional skateboarder
- Children: 2

Josh Kalis (born April 27, 1976) is a professional skateboarder who specializes in "street skateboarding". Kalis was sponsored by Alien Workshop for a significant period of time before switching to board sponsor, DGK, in 2009.

== Biography ==
Kalis was born in Grand Rapids, Michigan, US, and split his childhood between Philadelphia with his mother and Dallas with his father.

== Professional skateboarding ==
Alongside Stevie Williams (founder of DGK), Kalis is well known for his involvement in the "LOVE Park" scene in Philadelphia, US, during the late 1990s. LOVE Park (its official name is JFK Plaza) is an inner-city public park situated at the intersection of 16th Street and John F. Kennedy Boulevard in Center City Philadelphia. Kalis can be seen skating the park in the following videos: Photosynthesis, The DC Video, and Time Code.

Prior to joining the Alien Workshop team, Kalis was planning to collaborate with fellow professional skateboarder Mark Appleyard on their own board company. Following his eventual recruitment to the team, Kalis and Rob Dyrdek then facilitated the recruitment of Anthony Van Engelen (AVE).

Alongside Dyrdek, Kalis has been a longtime rider with the DC Shoes skate shoe company and, as of March 2013, his latest signature shoe, entitled the "Centric S", was released in mid-2012—the Centric S was incorporated into the DC "Rediscover" campaign and Kalis' model received the tagline, "Rediscover Heritage".

Silver Trucks was a brand that was launched in 2003 under the guidance of Dyrdek, an original team rider. Kalis has released signature products with the company, including a skate tool, and other team riders include Brandon Biebel, Chaz Ortiz, and Nyjah Huston.

Kalis left Alien Workshop to join Williams on DGK; Kalis explained the decision-making process in 2009:

Me and Stevie were just talking one day and were saying, "Man, we gotta team back up on somethin'," you know? We were talking about how just stale skateboarding was and how people just don't really hang out with each other anymore. They just kind of skate for companies, whether it be because it's just a cool company or it's a solid paycheck. Whatever, you know? We were just talking about how skateboarding just lost its vibe of friendship and lifestyle, you know?

Kalis has released a signature collection through sunglasses company 9five Eyewear, entitled the "KLS Signature Collection"—an accompanying video was also released to launch the products.

=== Sponsors ===
As of July 2012, Kalis is sponsored by DGK, DC Shoe Co., DC Apparel, 9five Eyewear, Reflex, MOB, and Silver.

== Video games ==
In January 2010, Electronic Arts (EA) announced that Kalis would be in the EA video game, "Skate 3". The company then published an introductory video for Kalis with the following blurb: "Kalis is one of the best. Simple as that. With his raw street skating, and one of a kind style, Josh Kalis is always a pleasure to watch. Make sure to take a look around Port Carverton and you might be lucky enough to see him yourself. Welcome to the city Kalis!"

== Hella Clips ==
Kalis launched the skateboard video upload portal "Hellaclips" in partnership with fellow professional skateboarder Colin McKay in late-2011.

== Influence ==
In July 2013, professional skateboarder Paul Rodriguez identified Kalis as one of his "top ten" favorite professional skateboarders and explained the inclusion on his personal website:

The style, the swag, his tre flips. If you ask me he has the best flat ground tre flips. He’s still killing it and ripping as well. He had that East Coast Philly vibe when I first came in the game, I know he spent a lot of time in S.F. as well but that Love Park era, man! He made that place look so fun to me. He introduced the world to Stevie Williams.

== Personal life ==
Unlike most professionals, Kalis has not remained in California for the entire duration of his career and has resided in various cities, both within and outside of the US. Kalis has lived in Grand Rapids in Michigan (where he grew up), Chicago, Philadelphia, Dallas, San Diego, Barcelona, and San Francisco. Dyrdek has stated:

He's truly lived in all of like the true skate meccas for pure street skating. You know what I mean? Like no one else has done that. When SF was cracking, he moved to SF. When Philly was resurging, he moved to Philly and blew Philly up. When LOVE Park went down, he made the movement to spending six months a year in Barcelona. And then he desperately tried to turn Chicago into Philly. That didn't work out so hard. And he is pure of, wake up in your house and go skate raw street. And it's one of the purest, pure street skateboarding careers.

Josh Kalis has lived in many places throughout his career. His name is synonymous with skateboarding in Philadelphia, San Francisco, and Chicago. In 2012, Kalis resided in Carlsbad, California, US, with his wife and two daughters but as of 2018 he left southern California to return to Grand Rapids and has been currently residing in Michigan.

== Videography ==
- 411VM: Issue 9 (1994)
- Etnies: High 5 (1995)
- Toy Machine: Heavy Metal (1995)
- FTC: Video III (1997)
- Alien Workshop: Timecode (1997)
- Transworld: The Sixth Sense (1998)
- Transworld: The Reason – incorporated into Williams' full video part (1999)
- Zoo York: Peep This (1999)
- Alien Workshop: Photosynthesis (2000)
- Transworld: Anthology – shared part with Williams (2000)
- DC Shoes: The DC Video (2003)
- Alien Workshop: Kalis in Mono (2006)
- Streets: NYC (2006)
- Alien Workshop: Mind Field (2009)
- DGK: Parental Advisory (2012)
- DGK: Blood Money (2014)
- DC: No Love Lost (2021)
