= Chaz Ortiz =

American professional skateboarder (born 1994)

Chaz Ortiz (born May 4, 1994) is an American professional skateboarder. As of 2017, he is ranked the 23rd skateboarder globally and the 13th in street skating. In 2012, he gained recognition as the youngest person to place first in the Dew Tour Championship.

== Life and career ==
Growing up in the suburbs of Chicago, Ortiz had a knack for skateboards when he received his first one from his cousin at age six. Although acquired his interest at a young age, his real competitive upbringing was in the footsteps of his dad; Mark Ortiz, through wrestling.

Ortiz became the state wrestling champion at age 11 but went back to skateboarding in time to prepare for the Gatorade Free Flow Tour, where he finished in first place at age 13. The same year, he took the second-place spot in the Volcom Damn Am contest, behind Scott DeCenzo.

Ortiz obtained his professional status at age 14 through Zoo York, after finishing in 6th place at Zoo York's Am Getting Paid 2006 Street Finals. Since then, he has been regularly finishing in the top tier of many events and has been selected to compete in Street League Skateboarding with the best skaters around the world.

Ortiz is featured in the video game Tony Hawk: Shred. He is of mixed Mexican and Irish ancestry.

== Sponsorship ==
Chaz Ortiz turned pro at the age of 14 through Zoo York, and has since then accumulated sponsorships from Zoo York, DGK, Ricta Wheels, Krux Trucks, Mob Grip, Bronson Bearings, Shapes Wax, Uprise Skateshop, Ethika, and OC Ramps.

== Contest history ==
Event - 2017	Date	Contestants	Placing
Street League Chicago Prelims	August	25	15
X Games Minneapolis Men's Street Finals	July	10	4
X Games Minneapolis Street Prelims	July	16	6
Dew Tour Pro Street Qualifiers	June	23	18

Event - 2016	Date	Contestants	Placing
Street League NYC Qualifiers	August	23	10
2016 SLS Pro Open Barcelona	May 21	8	7

Event - 2015	Date	Contestants	Placing
Tampa Pro 2015 Finals	March	12	5
Tampa Pro 2015 Semi-Finals	March 22	32	6
Tampa Pro 2015 Qualifiers	March 21	67	21

Event - 2014	Date	Contestants	Placing
Tampa Pro 2014 Finals	March 23	12	2
Tampa Pro 2014 Semi-Finals	March 23	33	3
Tampa Pro 2014 Qualifiers	March 22	72	5
Tampa Pro 2014 Silver Trucks Best Trick Contest	March 21	5	4

Event - 2013	Date	Contestants	Placing
Street League Finals - Brazil	April 21	21	5
Street League Prelims - Brazil	April 19	8	5
Tampa Pro 2013 Finals	March 24	12	3
Tampa Pro 2013 Semi-Finals	March 24	32	3
Tampa Pro 2013 Qualifiers	March 23	64	4

Event - 2012	Date	Contestants	Placing
Dew Tour Street Finals Round 1	October 20	12	9
Dew Tour Street Semi-Finals	October 20	30	1
Street League Newark, NJ 2012	August 26	8	3
Street League Glendale, AZ 2012	July 15	24	11
XGames Street 2012	July 1	20	4
Street League Ontario 2012	June 15	24	2
Street League Kansas City 2012	May 19	23	3
Tampa Pro 2012 Street Qualifiers	March 26	77	1
Tampa Pro 2012 Street Finals	March 26	12	2

Event - 2011	Date	Contestants	Placing
Street League New Jersey, August 2011	August 27	6	4
X Games 17 Street	July 29	5	4
Street League Arizona, July 2011	July 17	10	9
Street League Kansas City June 2011	June 12	20	3
Street League Seattle May 2011	May 8	20	3
Tampa Pro 2011 Street Semi-Finals	March 13	32	8
Tampa Pro 2011 Street Finals	March 13	12	7
Tampa Pro 2011 Silver Best Trick	March 13	5	3
Tampa Pro 2011 Qualifiers	March 12	86	4

Event - 2010	Date	Contestants	Placing
Street League: Las Vegas, Nevada Finals	Sept 25	21	4
Street League: Ontario, California Finals	Sept 15	22	2
SLS World Tour: Ontario, Canada	Sept 11	2	2
SLS World Tour: Glendale, Arizona	August 28	24	6
Street League: Glendale, Arizona Finals	August 28	22	6
Tampa Pro 2010 Street Semi-Finals	March 14	33	3
Tampa Pro 2010 Street Finals	March 14	12	10
Tampa Pro 2010 Street Qualifiers	March 12	82	8

Event - 2009	Date	Contestants	Placing
XGames Street Elimination	July 31	15	6
Dew Tour Park Finals	July 25	12	4
Maloof Money Cup Pro Street Semi-Finals	July 12	29	14
Maloof Money Cup Pro Street Qualifiers	July 10	33	4
Tampa Pro 2009 Street Semi-Finals	March 22	34	3
Tampa Pro 2009 Street Finals	March 22	12	3
Tampa Pro 2009 Street Qualifiers	March 21	72	7

Event - 2008	Date	Contestants	Placing
Damn Am Minneapolis 2008 Street Semi-Finals	June 8	28	6
Damn Am Minneapolis 2008 Street Finals	June 8	12	2
Damn Am Minneapolis 2008 Street Qualifiers	June 7	93	7
Phoenix Am 2008 Street Semi-Finals	April 6	35	9
Phoenix Am 2008 Street Finals	April 6	11	2
Phoenix Am 2008 Street Qualifiers	April 5	112	3
Tampa Am 2008 Street Finals	Jan 20	12	6
Tampa Am 2008 Street Semi-Finals	Jan 20	35	3

Event - 2007	Date	Contestants	Placing
Damn Am Costa Mesa 2007 Finals	Oct 28	13	2
Damn Am Costa Mesa 2007 Semi-Finals	Oct 28	30	3
Damn Am Costa Mesa 2007 Friday Qualifiers	Oct 26	94	2
Dew Tour-Play Station Pro: Skate Park Prelim	Oct 19	12	6
Dew Tour-Play Station Pro: Skate Park Finals	Oct 19	12	6
Damn Am Minneapolis 2007 Semi-Finals	June 10	29	1
Damn Am Minneapolis 2007 Finals	June 10	12	2
Damn Am Minneapolis 2007 Saturday Qualifiers	June 9	112	5
Tampa Am 2007 Sunday Street Semi-Final	Jan 21	37	30
Tampa Am 2007 Friday Street Qualifiers	Jan 19	110	13

Event - 2006	Date	Contestants	Placing
Damn Am Costa Mesa 2006 Semi-Finals	Oct 29	36	16
Damn Am Costa Mesa 2006 Saturday Qualifiers	Oct 28	103	9
Zoo York's Am Getting Paid 2006 Street Finals	Sept 24	15	6
Zoo York's Am Getting Paid 2006 Street Semi-Finals	Sept 24	39	19
Phoenix Am 2006 Qualifiers	April 1	113	59
Phoenix Am 2006 Eliminator Semi-Finals	March 25	35	13
Phoenix Am 2006 Street Qualifiers	March 24	109	14

Event - 2005	Date	Contestants	Placing
Damn Am Costa Mesa 2005 Friday Qualifiers	Oct 28	90	46
Damn Am Minneapolis 2005 Street Qualifiers	June 11	116	43

Event - 2004	Date	Contestants	Placing
Damn Am Minneapolis 2003 Street Qualifiers	Sept 20	75	44

== Filmography ==
- Zoo York - State of Mind (2009)
- Proof: (2009)
- FKD: Park Project Finale (2010)
- Zoo York: True East (2012)
- Zoo York: The Chaz Ortiz Video (2012)
- Zoo York: King Of New York (2013)
- DGK: Zeitgeist (2022)
- DGK: Amen (2023)
- DGK: 247 Sway & Slew (2023)
