= Grant Taylor (skateboarder) =

American professional skateboarder (born 1991)

Grant Taylor (born October 30, 1991) is an American professional skateboarder. He is the son of former professional skateboarder Thomas Taylor and won Thrasher Magazine's Skater of The Year in 2011. Grant's style of skateboarding is known to be fast and powerful. He is recognized for his unique versatile skateboarding.

== Early life ==
Taylor was born in Atlanta, Georgia. Grant began skateboarding at the age of six. He began competing in amateur competitive skateboarding contests in the early 2000s, and in 2004 Grant took home second place at the Phoenix Am. Volcom noticed that Grant was incredibly talented early in his career, and began sponsoring him at an early stage in his skateboarding career. It is said that Grant's father, Thomas Taylor, has had a profound influence on Grant's introduction to skateboarding. Remy Stratton is quoted as saying “Several years later when he was six, Thomas began bringing him (Grant) to the vert sessions at Surf Expo in Orlando, FL. Grant would start from the bottom while we watched from the decks and the crowds cheered. Then he just dropped in and the crowd went nuts. Everyone loved Grant. He was determined to shred, even at this age, he fit in and was embraced by all.” In an article titled “The Greatness of Grant Taylor”, written by Chris Nieratko, he demonstrates that Thomas’ lax mentoring style was evident when Grant and his father skateboarded together, stating “When I went to visit them in the late '90s, I watched them shoot a doubles photo on their then miniramp with Grant blasting over his dad's lip trick. Later they went downtown and shot a doubles street photo at Bell South. In an age where skate dads are more militant coaches than bros, Thomas was always more of a skate homie than a trick choreographer”. In the same article, Nieratko also comments on how influential Thomas has been on Grant's life in skateboarding, saying “It's thanks to Thomas that we have Grant in our lives, both literally and figuratively. Thomas taught young Grant to skate everything at a very early age”.

== Family ==
Grant's father, Thomas Taylor, has had a profound impact on the skateboarding industry. Thomas Taylor is credited with formulating and operating Atlanta's first skateboard shop “Stratosphere" in Little Five Points. His mother, Rachael Taylor, was a full-time stay-at-home mom raising Grant as well his two sisters, McKenzie and Sarah. He married Lillian Jane Taylor (née Morgan) on Saturday, September 9, 2017 in Atlanta, Georgia.

== Professional skateboarding ==
Taylor is "goofy"-footed and attained professional status in 2009, shortly after his acclaimed appearance in Nike SB's skateboard film, Debacle. He is recognized as representing the epitome of a new breed of skateboarder, blending contemporary style with the older traditions of skateboarding. He is known for his versatile riding, not shying away from various forms of skateboarding. He was born in Atlanta, Georgia and currently resides in Los Angeles, California.

== Sponsors ==
Taylor's sponsors are Monster Energy Drink, Anti-Hero, Independent, Thrasher Magazine, Stratosphere Skateshop, Shake Junt, Nike SB, Modus and Spitfire.

== Contest history ==
Along with members of the Nike SB Team, Taylor won Thrasher's "King of The Road" contest in 2010 and also participated in the 2011 competition. Grant also won the silver medal in the skateboard park competition for the 2014 summer X-Games in Austin, TX.

== 2011 Skater of the Year ==
In 2011, Grant won one of skateboarding's most coveted awards, Thrasher Magazine Skater of The Year award. Grant won the award over other stand out skaters of 2011, including Nyjah Huston and Dennis Busenitz. Several reasons attribute to Grant's award of Skater of the Year. At the outset of 2011, Grant attained to back-to-back covers (January & February) for Thrasher magazine, an attribute previously only held by professional skateboarder Neil Blender. 2011 also marked the second year Grant would attend the Thrasher King of the Road contest tour event and his second Thrasher Skate Rock tour. While other contenders for the Skater of the Year award were taking the more traditional route of competing in contest after contest, and seeking mainstream attention from the skateboarding world, Grant utilized the more traditional and humble modes of coverage, mainly sticking to print magazines, video footage and word-of-mouth. In honor of Grant winning the skater of the year award his primary and longest serving sponsor Volcom released a statement and tribute to Taylor, “These last few years Grant put it in hyper drive, truly a calculated adrenalin junky in constant attack mode. We are simply pleased as punch that Grant is now Thrasher Magazine's SKATER of the YEAR! Being alongside him, watching him grow up and become who he is today has been nothing short of incredible. We at VOLCOM all say Congratulations and wish you the best”. Grant's professional shoe sponsor, Nike SB, also honored his achievement of what could be considered skate boarding's most prestigious award by designing limited run team edition 2 shoes. The team editions 2's are black suede, featuring a Skater of the Year ’11 and are showcased in a luxuriously engraved wooden shoe box. Only Grant, friends and family were awarded with the shoes.

== Awards ==
Thrasher

- 2011 Skater Of The Year
- 2014 Silver Medal X-Games Skateboard Park

Transworld Skateboarding

- 2010 Awards Best Transition
- 2010 Awards Best Video Part (Debacle)

== Video Parts ==
Nike SB

- On Tap (2004)
- Nothing But The Truth (2007)
- Debacle (2009)
- Don't Fear The Sweeper (2010)
- The SB Chronicles volume 1 (2011)
- The SB Chronicles volume 2 (2013)
- Constant (2021)

Skate Park of Tampa

- Tampa AM Experience (2006)

Independent Truck Company

- 30th Anniversary Tour (2008)

Alien Workshop

- Mind Field (2009)

Anti-Hero

- Destination Unknown (2014)

Thrasher

- King of The Road (2010)
- Killing Time (2011)
- King of The Road (2011)

Stratosphere Skateshop

- VHS Tape (2010)
- Skate and Beyond (2012)

Volcom

- Holy Stokes! A Real Life Happening (2016)
