= Fabian Alomar =

American pro skateboarder and actor

- Born: Echo Park, Los Angeles
- Occupations: Pro skater, Actor
- Known for: Skating, Cholos Try, Mayans M.C., This Fool
- Criminal charges: Kidnapping, carjacking, robbery (2000s), Drug possession (2013)
- Criminal penalty: 7 years (2000s), 18 months (2013)

Fabian Alomar is an American pro skateboarder and actor born and raised in Echo Park, Los Angeles. He began skateboarding in the 1990s and became professional by 1996. He was arrested a few times and narrowly avoided a third-strike life prison sentence in 2013. His career was revitalized with the help of the Anti-Recidivism Coalition and other supporters such as Danny Trejo. He has been cast in several shows, including Mayans M.C. (2021–23) and This Fool (2022–).

== Early life ==
Alomar was born into a poor neighborhood where violence was frequent. Gang culture was prevalent in the area, which personally affected his household. His father and brother both went to prison for long sentences for violent crimes when Alomar was young.

== Skating career ==
Alomar became recognizable in the skate scene in the early 90s and became pro after riding for brands such as Vans, Menace Skateboards, and Spitfire Wheels. He was sponsored and began skating for XLarge, which eventually led him into contact with fellow skateboarder and artist Mark Gonzales.

Later in his skating career around 1998, Alomar was becoming more involved in crime. He described it as that he got involved with drugs as a "late bloomer" in his pro skating years after avoiding drugs for many years, and this made his participation in crime more frequent.

== Arrests ==
In a situation involving a man and his sister, Alomar reportedly defended his sister by physically assaulting the man. He put him in the trunk of his car, but was surrounded by police and arrested. He was arrested for carjacking, kidnapping, and robbery. He almost received 20 plus years as a sentence, but took seven years. The sentence reduction was helped by his skateboarding career background and the support of his lawyer and others.

In 2013, he was set to receive a third-strike sentence of 26 years-to-life in prison after being arrested for marijuana possession. Javorsky described the situation at the time: "He was skating down Hollywood Blvd, and got stopped for skating on the [Hollywood Walk of Fame] stars, and [the cops] searched him. Because he was on parole, this [crime] just became massive real quick. While on the inside, he had a controlled substance on him, [adding] another strike." In response, friend and fellow actor/model Tatiana Javorsky formed a campaign with help from Dirty Ghetto Kids founder Stevie Williams Diamond Supply Co.'s Nick Tershay to reduce the sentence. The campaign was successful and Alomar's sentence was reduced to 18 months.

== Acting career ==
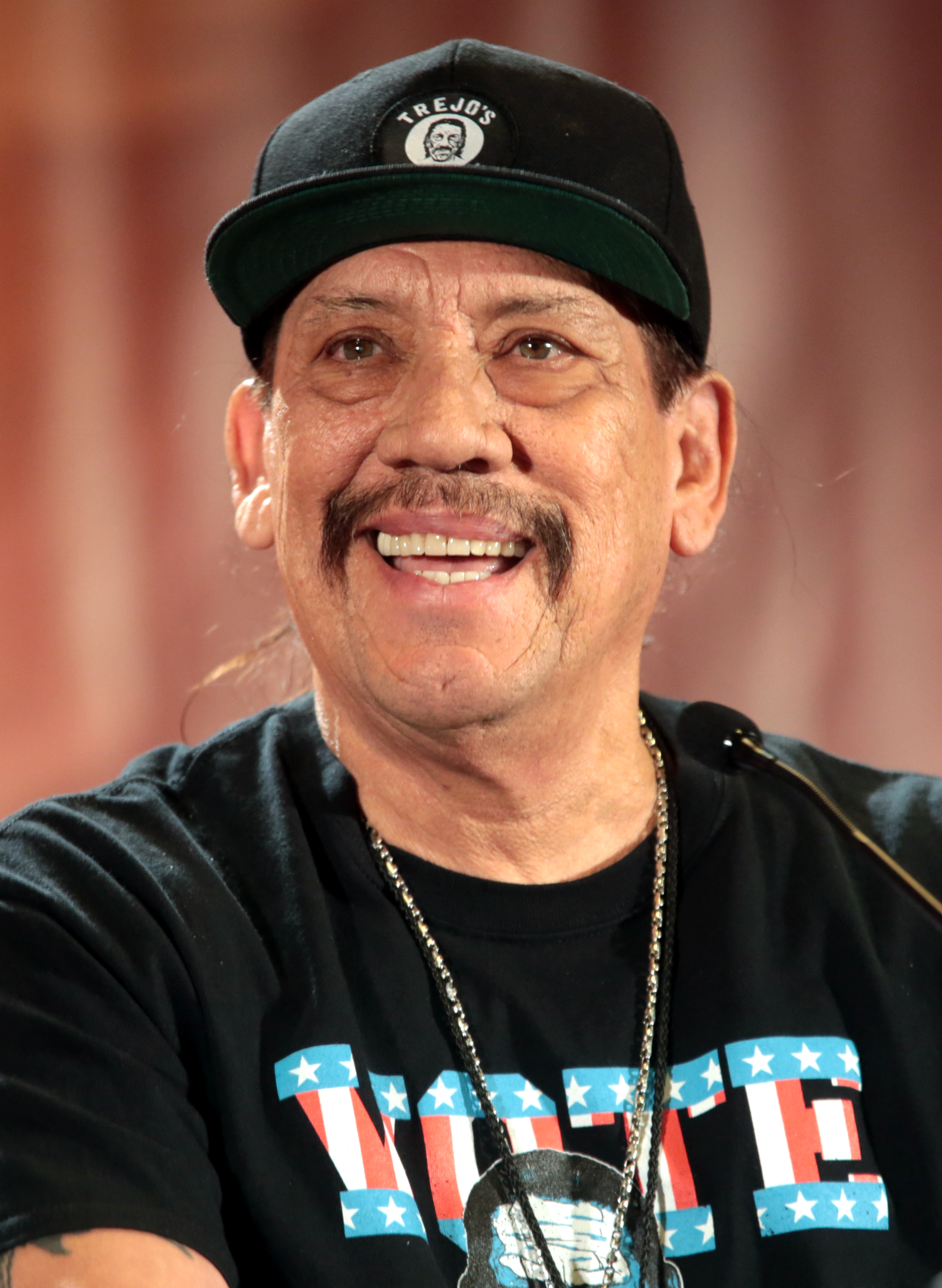
Danny Trejo helped Alomar after he was released from prison.

Danny Trejo, the Anti-Recidivism Coalition (ARC), and others helped him after he was released from prison.

In 2015, Alomar was a part of the viral internet video series Cholos Try Vegan along with Carlos Ayala and Mario Ponce by we are mitú which gained him recognition, especially among young Latinos.

In 2020, he was added to the cast of Mayans M.C. in the show's third season.

In 2021, Alomar was announced to join the cast of Eva Longoria's feature film Flamin' Hot by Searchlight Pictures following the story of former Frito Lay janitor Richard Montañez.

In 2022, he also joined the cast of Latino comedian Chris Estrada's Hulu comedy series This Fool produced by ABC Signature.
