= Kader Sylla =

American skateboarder

Personal information
- Born: Kader Sylla; 16 October 2002 (age 23) Woodland Hills, California, U.S.
- Website: @laterkader

Sport
- Country: USA
- Sport: Skateboarding

Kader Sylla (born 2002) is an American professional skateboarder from Studio City, California. Kader is goofy-footed.

== Early life ==
Sylla was born and raised in the Los Angeles neighborhood of Encino, California. His interest in the sport of skateboarding began at a young age through his exposure to fingerboards. At the age of six, he received his first skateboard from his grandma, who purchased it from a local CVS. Sylla watched online YouTube tutorials to improve his skateboarding. His main inspirations to skate were that of Rowan Zorilla, Torey Pudwill and Ryan Sheckler.

== Skateboarding ==
Kader signed with Baker Skateboards as an amateur in 2016. He was first scouted by company owner Andrew Reynolds. Since then, he has appeared at numerous skate demos for the team. In Late September 2017, He signed with Emerica. Since then, Kader has switched to Vans in 2018, for which he has released a number of partnered skate shoes. He left Vans in late 2020 and soon became sponsored by Nike Skateboarding. After a short stint with Nike, Kader then switched to Adidas as his shoe sponsor.

In 2019, at the age of 16, Sylla went pro for Baker Skateboards. In the same year, Kader also managed to make his entry into the Supreme skate team.

Kader is also a member of Carcasscrew, a skateboarding group that consists of multiple skaters recognized by different skateboard deck brands. Members of the group along with Kader are Andrew Reynolds, his daughter Stella Reynolds, Jay Thorpe, and Kevin Long. Kader came up with the name for the skate crew.

=== Sponsors ===
Sylla's sponsors are Violet Skateboards, Adidas Skateboarding, Shake Junt, Venture, Stance Socks, Spitfire, CCS, ValSurf Skate Shop, and Supreme NY.

== Filmography ==
In 2017, Sylla appeared in the Emerica video Young Emericans and the Baker Ams video. Sylla also had a part in the Thrasher - Am Scramble 2018. In 2019, Sylla appeared in Boys of Summer 2 by Logon Lara swell as Supreme NY's "CANDYLAND" video Courtesy by Vans Canada. He also appears in Melodi's first EC video and Tristan Warren's "DREAM2021MOVIEVILLE" and has released 2 solo parts on his personal YouTube channel titled "thankyouvans" and "fuckthisskateshit". In December 2019, Kader had the opening part in Baker 4. Sylla was also frequently featured in seasons 9 and 10 of the Camp Woodward Show when he was younger. In 2021, Sylla appeared in Supreme's 'STALLION' video. In 2022 Kader did a handful of tricks in Supreme's Play Dead video.
