= Ethika =

American clothing company

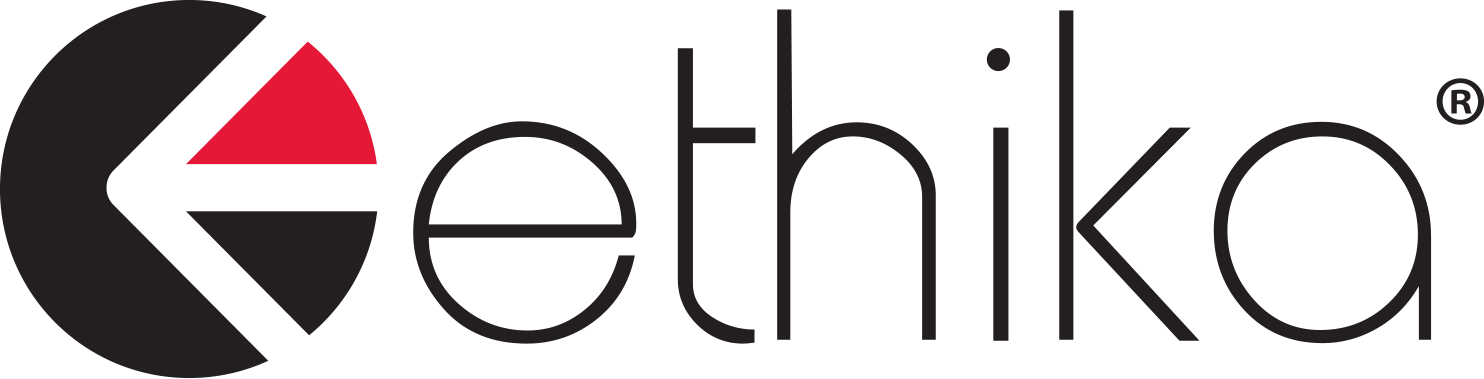
- Company type: Limited Liability Company
- Industry: Clothing
- Founded: 2001
- Founder: Malcolm McCassy
- Headquarters: San Clemente, California
- Key people: Matt Cook (Chairman & CEO)
- Products: Underwear
- Website: www.ethika.com

Ethika is an American men's and women's underwear company founded in 2001 by Malcolm McCassy, Travis Pastrana, and professional skateboarder Ryan Sheckler. The company is based in San Clemente, California and has produced a longer fitting boxer brief, which they refer to as "The Staple."

== History ==
Ethika was founded in 2001 by Malcolm McCassy when he noticed a void in the Men's Underwear category. There was no underwear brand that offered a multi-purpose product for the active lifestyle that also had the ‘cool factor’. During this time, many different fits and fabrics were sampled in hopes of creating something new and different in the category.

In order to gain exposure for the brand, stickers were placed on some of the top skateboarders and motocross riders. Skateboarder Ryan Sheckler was seen at the X-Games when he was just 13 years old with an Ethika sticker on his helmet. After much testing, there was an overwhelming response from the athletes to produce a longer fitting pair of briefs in cotton fabric. At this time, there were no lifestyle underwear brands offering fits of this length in the market. In 2005, The Staple Fit was developed and the brand finally had its marquee product.

At the end of 2009, Ethika launched an official website and the brand began shipping limited product out of Malcolm's garage. Over the next few years, brand popularity began to grow among key athletes and influencers because of comfort and all around usage. Product started to be seen on top athletes but also celebrities and musicians. Justin Bieber, Lil Jon, Brody Jenner and numerous others have been seen wearing the brand.

In late 2012, the current CEO, Matt Cook joined the company. That year, Ethika moved into Matt's existing offices, hired several employees, and began selling product to select retail accounts. Ethika started to expand its brand ambassadors in the Music and Lifestyle Categories.

Zumiez and Tillys, both national action sport retail chains, worked with Ethika to build the underwear category. At this time, Ethika was also working on its own digital platform. With the combination of some moderate retail and online success, the company started to see some growth. During this time, the brand developed its product strategy into three categories – Lifestyle, Performance and Premium. Slowly, new styles were developed and tested online to determine marketability and acceptance, which is a strategy that is still practiced.

In 2014, Ethika began to develop a women's line, which was eventually ready to launch in late 2015. A youth line was also created and launched during this time, allowing the brand to offer something for everyone.

In mid 2016, Ethika gained more international popularity when it signed a multi-year deal with global soccer superstar Dani Alves. Part of their deal included a signature series of lifestyle and performance underwear, which was released and sold online and through select retailers.

Early in 2017, Ethika continued to establish itself as a leader in lifestyle and culture by releasing an exclusive collection of hip-hop music called the RGB Mixtape. The project featured new songs and signature Ethika designed underwear from 12 hip-hop artists including Meek Mill, Kid Ink, Ace Hood, Jahlil Beats, Casey Veggies, Dave East, Chevy Woods and others.

Shortly after the launch of the RGB Mixtape, Ethika announced a partnership with motorsports icon Valentino Rossi, which also included a signature collection that released in June 2017.

== Ethika Music ==
Music has been a huge source of influence and growth for Ethika. Lil Jon, Justin Bieber, Lil Wayne, Machine Gun Kelly, and Meek Mill were some of the first artists seen wearing the brand. Soon after, Kid Ink, Casey Veggies, The Game and Chevy Woods all released signature collections. In 2017, Ethika released a hip-hop mixtape, RGB1 with twelve artists – Meek Mill, Kid Ink, Casey Veggies, Lil Durk, Chevy Woods, Ace Hood, Bricc Baby, YBS Skola, Jahlil Beats, Tdot Illdude, Dave East and Bok Nero. Each artist released a new exclusive song in addition to a new signature design of Ethikas. The project was said to become an annual release for Ethika.

In 2018, Ethika released their second mix tape, RGB2. Kid Ink, Casey Veggies, Lil Durk, Ace Hood, YBS Skola, Tdot Illdude, Casey Veggies returned for RGB2. Its 19 tracks were rounded out by the likes of 2 Chainz, Lil Wayne, Kodak Black, Lil Skies, Chevy Woods, Zoey Dollaz, and Young Jordan.

Ethika's Prophesy Mixtape also dropped in 2018, with 13 tracks from a younger generation of artists. Just like RGB1 and RGB2, each artist also has a signature pair of Ethikas.

== Promotional contracts ==
The company hired motorsports athlete Travis Pastrana in 2001 to be part of the "Ethika familie". Skateboarder Ryan Sheckler is also employed. Other athletes hired by Ethika include:

- Ryan Sheckler
- Travis Pastrana
- Klay Thompson
- Jarvis Landry
- Jeremy Hill
- Michael Carter-Williams
- Shabazz Muhammad
- Dion Waiters
- Lou Williams
- Cody Latimer
