= Marcus McBride =

American skateboarder

Marcus McBride is an American professional skateboarder and entrepreneur who lives and works in Atlanta, Georgia and California.

== Early life ==
Marcus and his brother Lavar grew up in San Francisco CA. Marcus first skated at the age of 9 in Oakland, California. He took it up more seriously around the age of 13. The first real skateboard McBride got was a Jesse Martinez pro model.

== Skateboarding career ==
McBride's brother Lavar excelled at skating, getting sponsorship from Blind Skateboards. Lavar would include Marcus with him to LA when he used to go film for Blind. Marcus went down there a handful of times. The brothers would stay with Rodney Mullen. Marcus described Rodney as "a cool dude. He used to look out for us… take us out to eat and skate everywhere."

While in LA, Jason Dill would see Marcus skate and him boards from 101. Marcus ended up riding for 101 as he admired the team which included Jason Dill, Gino Iannucci, Clyde, and Natas.

=== D.G.K ===
McBride is a founding member of DGK, helping Stevie Williams start company in 2002 .
