= Boo Johnson =

American skateboarder (born 1993)

Personal information
- Nickname: Boo Johnson
- Born: Jakel Johnson; February 1, 1993 (age 33) Tehachapi, California, U.S.

Sport
- Country: USA
- Sport: Skateboarding

Boo Johnson (born Jakel Johnson, February 1, 1993) is an American goofy-footed skateboarder and skate company owner, recognized for his style and positive attitude.

== Professional skateboarding career ==
Johnson turned pro at the age of 23, in 2016.

Skate Video Parts	Year
The Berrics – Trickipedia	2008
Supra – Three Amigos Texas Tour	2011
DGK – Blood Money	2014
We Are Blood – by Ty Evans	2015
DGK – Saved	2017
DGK – Beware of the Underdogs	2018

=== Pharmacy board shop ===
Johnson owns Pharmacy Long Beach, a skate shop in Long Beach, CA.

=== JHF – Just Have Fun clothing ===
Johnson owns his own clothing company, Just Have Fun, founded in 2016.

=== Inspiration ===
Johnson takes inspiration from people who inspire others, namely: Bob Marley, David Goggins, Alan Watts, Will Smith, and others.
