= Neil Blender =

American skateboarder

Neil Blender (born 1963) is an American former professional skateboarder, skate company owner, and artist. His pro career began during his senior year of high school in 1981. He is regular-footed. By 1986, Blender invented at least two tricks, the Wooly Mammoth and the Gay Twist. Neil is also credited with naming and conceptualizing several tricks.

== Skateboarding ==
=== Early life ===
Blender skated for Powerflex for three years in his mid-teens. Brad Jackman introduced Blender to Gail Webb, team manager of Powerflex who signed Neil. After Powerflex went out of business, Blender skated a contest at the Big 'O' Skatepark in Orange, placing first. Steve Cathey from the G&S amateur skateboarding team appreciated Blender's skating and signed him to G&S.

In January 1981, Blender appeared on national television on the 'World of People' television program, which featured footage from a skate contest in San Francisco.

=== Professional career ===
In 1990 Chris Carter, Mike Hill, and Blender decided to form Alien Workshop, a company based in Dayton, Ohio, at a time when the skateboard industry's core was located in California.

Throughout his career, Blender often made cameos in other companies skate videos. In 2015, Blender was inducted into the Skateboarding Hall of Fame.

In the 30th Anniversary edition of Transworld Skateboarding, published on December 20, 2011, Blender was number 19 of the 30 most influential skaters of all time.

=== Skate video appearances ===
- 1985 - Summer Sessions - Sure-Grip International
- 1985-87 - NSA contest videos: Del Mar, Houston, Chicago
- 1988 - The Vision Pro Skate Escape
- 1988 - Thrasher - Savannah Slamma
- 1988 - Ohio Skateout
- 1989 - Santa Cruz - Speed Freaks
- 1989 - Goin' Off!
- 1989 - Ban This (Powell Peralta)
- 1990 - Gordon & Smith- Footage
- 2004 - Destroy Everything Now - 88 Footwear

== Art ==
In his teenage years, Blender enjoyed drawing cartoons and photography. Blender was one of the first skaters to design his own board graphics. Blender has also illustrated several album covers, most notably Dinosaur Jr.'s Without a Sound (1994).
