= James Jebbia =

American-British businessman and fashion designer

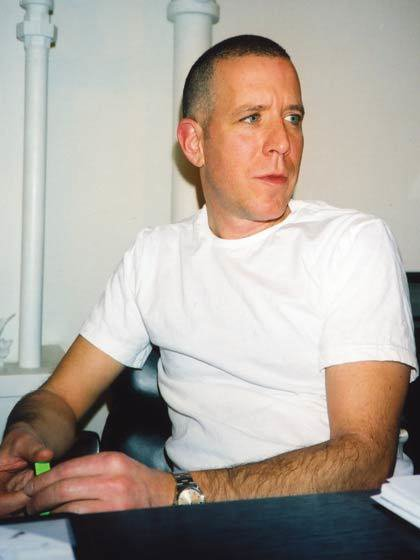
- Born: July 22, 1963 (age 63); New York City, U.S.
- Occupations: fashion designer; businessman
- Years active: 1977–present
- Known for: Founder of Supreme
- Spouse: Bianca Jebbia
- Children: 2

James Jebbia (born July 22, 1963) is an American-British businessman, fashion designer and former child actor. He is known for being the founder of the skateboarding shop and clothing brand Supreme.

== Early life ==
James Jebbia was born on July 22, 1963, in the United States. His American father was formerly in the United States Air Force, and his English mother was a former teacher. His parents divorced when he was around 10 years old.

At the age of one, Jebbia moved from the U.S. to Crawley, West Sussex, in the United Kingdom. In 1983, when he was 19 years old, Jebbia moved back to the United States, settling in Staten Island, New York City.

== Career ==
The logo of Supreme, the company Jebbia founded in 1994

In the late 1970s, Jebbia worked as a child actor. He played the role of Tommy Watson in the first series of Grange Hill.

In 1983, at the age of 19, Jebbia worked his first job in New York at Parachute, a high end avant garde clothing store located in SoHo, Manhattan. A few years later, in 1989, he worked as the manager of the streetwear store, Union NYC, which carried mainly English clothing brands. Its first store opened in 1989 on Spring Street in Manhattan, and later closed in 2009. From 1991 to 1994, Jebbia partnered with Shawn Stussy, the founder of the clothing brand, Stüssy.

In 1994, Jebbia founded the clothing brand and skateboarding shop Supreme, and opened its first store on Lafayette Street in Manhattan. Among his earliest designs was a cut-and-sew pair of tiger-stripe cargo pants. As of 2021, Supreme has 14 locations worldwide. Locations include New York City, Brooklyn, Chicago, San Francisco, Los Angeles, London, Paris, Milan, Berlin and Japan (Harajuku, Shibuya, Daikanyama, Nagoya, Osaka and Fukuoka).

Over the years, Jebbia has collaborated with high-profile artists, such as Damien Hirst, Takashi Murakami and Richard Prince. In 2017, Supreme collaborated with Louis Vuitton for their debut collection during Paris Fashion Week.

== Personal life ==
Jebbia is married to Bianca Jebbia and has two children. He resides in Lower Manhattan's West Village in New York City.
