= Dylan Rieder =

American skateboarder, artist, & model

Personal information
- Full name: Dylan Joseph Rieder
- Born: May 26, 1988 Westminster, California, U.S.
- Died: October 12, 2016 (aged 28) Duarte, California, U.S.
- Height: 5 ft 10 in (178 cm)

Sport
- Country: United States
- Sport: Skateboarding

Dylan Joseph Rieder (May 26, 1988 – October 12, 2016) was an American professional skateboarder, artist, and model.

== Early life ==
Born Dylan Joseph Rieder, in Westminster, California, to Joe Rieder, a barber, and Dana, née Webb, now Ortiz; raised alongside a younger sister, Makenna.

== Skateboarding career ==
Rieder started skating at the age of 9. He turned Pro at 18 with his breakout part in Transworld Skateboarding's 2006 video A Time To Shine. He was recognized as the Skateboard Mag's Am of the year in 2006. Rieder was featured in Supreme's 2014 video "Cherry", for which he won Transworld Skateboarding's award for Best Part in 2015. Before Dylan had turned Pro, he was featured in the Quicksilver Promo video in 2005. In 2009, Dylan had a video part in the Alien Workshop film "Mind Field" and in the following year his video part for Gravis was released (2010). Rolling Stone credited these two videos along with the video parts "Cherry" and "A Time to Shine" as defining moments of his career.

During his professional career, he partnered with several brands such as Alien Workshop, Vans, Birdhouse, Gravis Footwear, Huf, Osiris, Supreme, Quiksilver and Fucking Awesome.

=== Skate filmography ===
Year	Title
2003	Osiris Footwear - Subject to Change
2003	Grind
2006	Transworld - A Time To Shine
2006	Thrasher - Shotgun
2009	Alien Workshop - Mind Field
2010	Gravis - Dylan.
2013	Huf - Stoops Euro Tour
2014	Huf The Dylan
2014	Supreme - Cherry
2015	Boys Of Summer

=== Awards ===
Year	Title	Award
2010	Transworld	Readers Choice
2015	TransWorld Skateboarding Awards	Best Video Part for Cherry

== Modeling, fashion and retail ==
Rieder was featured in the 2014 Spring Ad Campaign of DKNY along with supermodel Cara Delevingne and Jourdan Dunn. In 2014, Rieder appeared in a photo spread on the fashions of designer Alexander Wang in Vogue. In the piece in memoriam to Rieder in GQ the magazine called him "The Skateboarder who changed fashion forever".

Along with fellow skateboarders, Jake Lamagno and Steven Ditchkus, Rieder owned a store in New York City's East Village neighborhood named "the Hunt" which specializes in "furniture and assorted oddities from the dark side of Americana". The emporium has since moved to a space on Canal Street, further south in downtown Manhattan.

== Illness and death ==
Rieder was first diagnosed with leukemia in July 2014. In March 2015, he received a bone marrow transplant from his sister and announced a month later that he was in remission. However, cancer returned in November that year and he received a second bone marrow transplant, again from his sister. He then was again in remission. But cancer returned once again. Mark Oblow said in an interview for The Skateboard Mag, "he didn't die from cancer, he beat cancer twice, you know he went into remission twice, it was due to a lung infection, his spine been damaged so bad and due to issues that chemotherapy caused to his eyes and due to damage it did to his liver and his lungs and all these things."

Rieder died on October 12, 2016, due to complications from leukemia. He was surrounded by over 50 family members and friends. Rolling Stone noted his passing with a feature focusing on the five best videos of Rieder's skateboarding career.

Numerous celebrities, including Tony Hawk, Cara Delevingne, Sharon Osbourne, Langley Fox, Cat Power and Camille Rowe, remembered Dylan as an inspiration on and off the board, a gentle human and a great friend. On his death the model and actress Cara Delevingne posted on social media the following "You will be so missed by so many people. Ride and Rest In Peace Dylan Rieder". Ozzy Osbourne stated, "Dylan Rieder. One of the most talented and brave men... I feel blessed to have known you. Rest in peace Dylan. My love and condolences to his family".

The Skateboard Mag saluted Rieder, stating: "It's hard to believe even typing this—we lost one of the best to ever step on a skateboard today. Dylan Rieder, whose flawless style, explosive power, and epic video parts influenced an entire generation and beyond, passed away today due to complications with Leukemia. Rest in peace, Dylan. Our thoughts and prayers go out to his friends and family in this unbelievably difficult time."

On October 30, Rieder's memorial was held at Hollywood Forever Cemetery. Hundreds of his friends and family were in attendance as well as musical tributes were offered by Austyn Gillette, Cat Power and Conor Oberst of Bright Eyes.

On November 13, Rieder's friends and family gathered at Sandy's Oahu, Hawaii, where some of his ashes were spread out into the ocean.

On the Jason Dill episode of Epicly Later'd in 2017, Dill said Dylan's mother also gave him and William Strobeck some of Dylan's ashes. Dylan's ashes were shown next to a picture of Dill and Dylan hugging.

== Competition rankings ==
=== Street League Skateboarding ===
Year	Title	Place
2010	Glendale, Arizona Finals	17th
2010	Las Vegas, Nevada Finals	18th
2011	Seattle	18th
2011	Kansas City (May)	19th
2012	Kansas City (JULY)	14th
2012	Ontario	21st
2012	Glendale	22nd
2013	Street League Finals - Brazil	19th
2013	Kansas City	5th

=== X Games ===
Year	Title	Place
2011	SKB Real Street	99th
2012	Los Angeles	15th
2013	Los Angeles	16th
2013	Barcelona	13th
2013	Foz do Iguaçu	19th
