= Harmen Liemburg =

Dutch graphic designer and screen printer

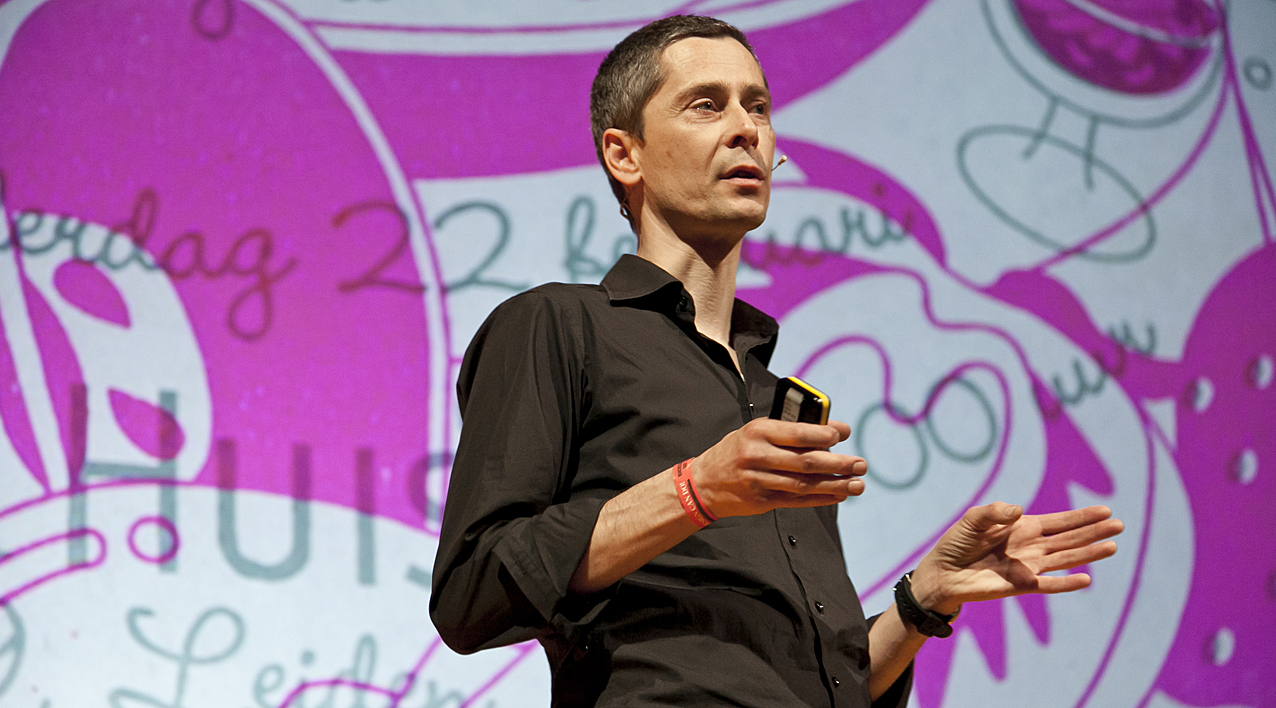
- Harmen Liemburg in 2012
- Born: 1 July 1966 (age 59); Lisse, Netherlands
- Occupations: graphic designer, screen printer

Harmen Liemburg (born 1 July 1966) is a Dutch graphic designer and screen printer. His work includes posters, publications and record sleeves, and is also applied in architecture.

== Education and career ==
From 1985 to 1992, Liemburg studied social geography and cartography at Utrecht University. Working with cartographic materials, putting up posters for pop venue Tivoli, working for graphic design agency Dietwee and a love for band design fueled his interest in graphic design and screen printing. This prompted him to enroll in the part-time graphic design program of the Gerrit Rietveld Academie. Since his graduation in 1998, Liemburg has been working as an independent graphic designer. He worked with Richard Niessen under the moniker Golden Masters until 2003. Together, they organized Jack (connecting plug): a series of events in Amsterdam in which they sought connections between artists and designers from different disciplines.

In addition to creating personal work for solo exhibitions, Liemburg also works as a commissioned designer. Clients include the Royal Palace of Amsterdam, the city of Amsterdam, the city of Utrecht, the Dutch Government Building Department, PostNL, Utrecht's Fletiomare swimming pool, the Amsterdam Noord subway station of the Amsterdam Noord/Zuidlijn. Liemburg's design for the Noord subway station (under construction) consists of a line drawing of nature scenes with birds using to the Amsterdam area or visiting it, inlaid in the platform floor.

From 2010 to 2015 Liemburg worked as the supervisor of the screen printing workshop of the Gerrit Rietveld Academy. He frequently lectures and conducts workshops in the Netherlands and abroad, especially in the United States and Canada. From 2004 to 2012, Liemburg wrote articles about graphic design and visual culture for Items magazine.

== Style and working method ==
Liemburg collects visual materials, found online and photographed offline, to create his designs. He transforms these materials (historical and other illustrations, mundane traffic signs, logos, and other forms of packaging) into vector drawings, and uses collage techniques to assemble them. Interweaving positive and negative space plays an important role in this process. Multiple layered elements are merged and take on a new meaning in the context of Liemburg's design.

Most of the time, Liemburg prints his own work, and he is known for layering opaque and transparent inks. When preparing his prints, he approaches the color separation (the division of the complete image across the various printed colors) in a way that allows him to print various transparent inks on top of each other, creating new colors in the process. That way, the work can be completed in a limited amount of print runs.

Liemburg about his work: "I try to create powerful, colorful work, in which intuition and feeling play a significant role, and that cannot be unraveled at first glance. Although all the elements are chosen and placed deliberately, the viewer is free to make his or her own interpretation."

== Personal life ==
Liemburg lives and works in Arnhem.

== Work in public collections (selection) ==
- Stedelijk Museum, Amsterdam
- Musée des Arts Décoratifs, Paris
- Museum für Gestaltung, Zürich

== Solo exhibitions (selection) ==
- 2009 - 2012 – Ultralight, a traveling exhibit in Europe and the US
- 2007 – Crispy Cloud Kombini, SieboldHuis, Leiden
- 2005 – KiKiRiKi Tous les Soirs, 16^{e} Festival international de l’affiche et du graphisme, Chaumont

== Awards (selection) ==
- 2013 – 23^{e} Festival international de l’affiche et du graphisme, Chaumont, second prize
- 2010 – 9th Moscow Global Biennale of Graphic Design Golden Bee, Moskou, first prize
- 2010 – 4th Hong Kong International Poster Triennial, Hong Kong, third prize
- 2006 – 17^{e} Festival international de l’affiche et du graphisme, Chaumont, second prize
