= Sean Greene =

American skateboarder

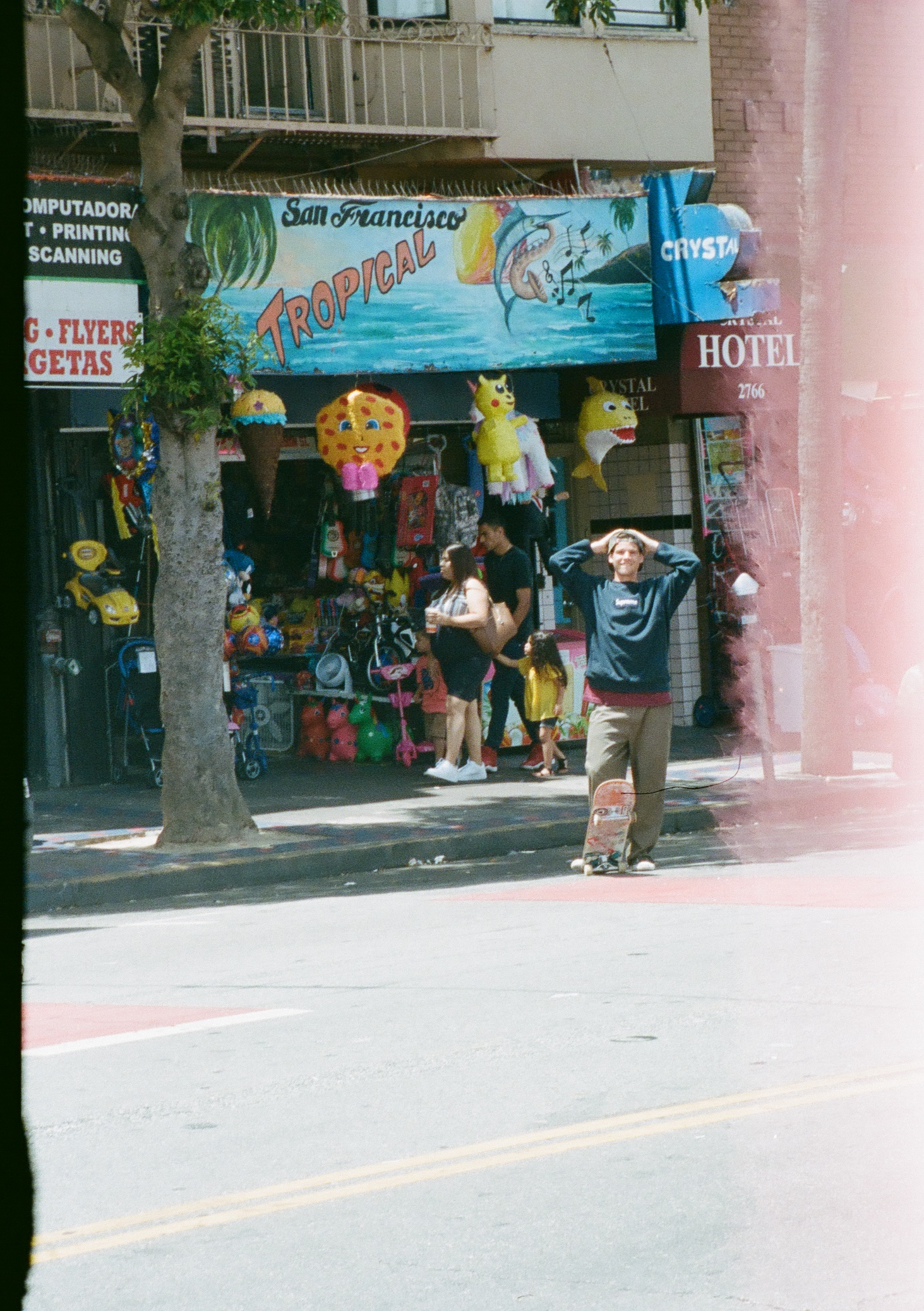
- Greene waits on Mission Street to skate at the 24th St Mission BART station SF – June 2019

Personal information
- Nationality: American
- Born: Sean Clarke Greene; July 16, 1987 (age 38) Irving, Texas

Sport
- Country: USA
- Sport: Skateboarding

Sean Greene (born July 16, 1987) is a regular-footed American professional skateboarder.

== Early life ==
Greene was born and raised in Irving, Texas. After watching Evel Knievel videos as a child, Greene aspired to be a stuntman.

== Skateboarding career ==
Greene moved to San Francisco after being encouraged by his friend Ceno. Greene is known for his gutsy approach to the steep streets of San Francisco. As a rider for GX1000, Greene and his cohorts are recognized for their fearless and often creative approach to riding down San Francisco's steepest hills. In 2017, Greene ollied into and rode down one of the steepest parts of Kearny Street.

=== Skate video parts ===
- 2016: The GX1000 Video – GX1000
- 2017: Deep Fried "Over Easy" – Cody Thompson
- 2017: Adrenaline Junkie – GX1000
- 2018: Roll Up – GX1000
- 2018: El Camino – GX1000

=== Sponsors ===
GX1000, Spitfire, Converse, Supreme, Independent Truck Company, Bronson Speed Co., Mob Grip, Hombre Hardware
