= Haroshi =

Japanese artist

Haroshi (born 1978 in Tokyo) is a Japanese artist. Haroshi's sculptural works are primarily constructed out of recycled skate decks.

== Creative practice ==
In addition to sculpture, Haroshi is a collector, painter, architect, and industrial designer. Haroshi's art studio in located in the outskirts of Tokyo. Haroshi sources the skateboards he uses in his sculptures from his skater friends and skate shops he is friendly with. He had the idea to use skateboards as a sculptural materials one day when he was staring at a stack of used skateboard decks in his room. Haroshi has also collaborated with MediCom and Karimoku Furniture to create bearbrick toys.
