= Alien Workshop =

American skateboarding company

Alien Workshop (AWS) is an independent American skateboarding company that was founded in 1990 by Chris Carter, Mike Hill, and Neil Blender in Dayton, Ohio. Following periods under the ownership of the Burton snowboard company and original team rider Rob Dyrdek in 2012, the company was acquired by Pacific Vector Holdings in October 2013. Alien Workshop produced skateboard decks, wheels, apparel, and other skateboard accessories prior to its closure in May 2014. In 2015, Alien Workshop was revived with an all-amateur team and distribution through Tum Yeto. They released a series of new skate decks and Bunker Down, the brand's sixth video. As of 2016, Alien Workshop, led by Mike Hill phased out working with Tum-Yeto and moved all operations back to the Mound Laboratories in Miamisburg, Ohio. After a tumultuous ownership history they have returned to operations as an independent company.

== History ==
=== 1990–1999: Formation, Memory Screen, Timecode ===
Carter, Hill and Blender decided to form a company based in Dayton, Ohio, United States, at a time when the skateboard industry's core was located in California. Early team rider Duane Pitre recalls attending a meeting in California and feeling excited about the concept of an innovative Midwestern company, which initially adapted the logo of the eatery that the Californian meeting occurred in. The nascent company's first video was titled Memory Screen (1991), and featured a team that consisted of Dyrdek, Pitre, Bo Turner, John Drake, John Pryor, Scott Conklin, Steve Claar and Thomas Morgan.

Following the release of Memory Screen, the company's focus on video production was equivalent to the products it was producing and Timecode was released in 1997, featuring new team riders Josh Kalis—who would remain with the brand for over 10 years—Lenny Kirk and Fred Gall, who would later ride for Habitat. While Memory Screen was 41 minutes-long, Timecode's duration was only 21 minutes and consisted of full parts from three out of the nine skateboarders in the video.

=== 2000–2008: Photosynthesis, Burton acquisition, Saari recruitment ===
Around the year 2000, the company hired Joe Castrucci to oversee the production of the Photosynthesis video—Castrucci would later oversee the development of the Habitat skateboard deck brand, which joined Alien Workshop under the DNA Distribution parent company that was created internally, and enlisted Alien Workshop riders, such as Kerry Getz and Danny Garcia, for the new brand. DNA Distribution, also known as the "Sovereign Sect," also consisted of the Reflex (bearings) brand—Guy Mariano and Kareem Campbell are two professional skateboarders who were sponsored by Reflex.

Photosynthesis was the first video in which Jason Dill and Anthony van Engelen, two team riders who would become foremost figures of the company, appeared. Dill's part in the video was the closing section and is accompanied by the Radiohead song "Polyethylene."

Dill explained in June 2014, during a narration to the video part, that he consumed "a lot" of crack cocaine during the filming of Photosynthesis and his part included his own footage, as well as footage shot by founder Hill. Dill revealed that the telephone conversation that occurs at the beginning of his part, between himself and Carter, was part of a collection of recordings that the company had of telephone conversations with Dill over a two-year period. At the commencement of his narration, Dill stated that he did not wish to partake in the exercise and felt on the verge of crying.

The video was also the first DNA Distribution video to feature Danny Way, who would later revive Plan B Skateboards; Anthony Pappalardo, who was recruited by the Chocolate and Lakai Limited Footwear companies afterwards; and Brian Wenning, who would join the revived Plan B team. Pappalardo later stated that hearing a message from Dyrdek on his answering machine and officially becoming an amateur rider for Alien Workshop—an occasion accompanied by a Castrucci-made commercial—were two experiences that has made him "proud, honored" and maybe led to "a sense of achievement from skateboarding".

DNA Distribution was acquired by Burton Snowboards on February 5, 2008 and several months later, on May 2, 2008, the Flip Skateboards company announced that its long-term team member Arto Saari had relocated to Alien Workshop—the announcement was a shock to members of the skateboarding media. In 2012, Saari provided further insight into his decision to leave Flip, citing the death of former teammate Shane Cross as an underpinning factor: "It wasn't, like, a easy thing to do, but, at the time, I knew I had to do it ... for the reasons that happened, you know? And that's why I decided that it's better off for me to leave Flip than, just, go my own way and, just, do that." Professional skateboarder, Ed Templeton, stated in a 2012 interview: "I mean I was completely shocked when he left Flip ... it didn't make sense."

=== 2009–2014: Mind Field, Dyrdek acquisition, Sovereign Sect closure ===
Around the time that Saari joined the Alien Workshop team, Jake Johnson was recruited by Dill and videographer William Strobeck. Johnson explained that he was originally asked to join the Stereo skateboard deck company, co-owned by Chris Pastras and Jason Lee, but was convinced by Dill not to become a "Stereo Sound Agent". The company's next video was Mind Field, a 60-minute-long production released in 2009 and directed by Greg Hunt. Full-length parts from both Saari and Johnson were featured in the video, and Kalis temporarily relocated to Barcelona, Spain to film his part—Transworld Skateboarding magazine's Oliver Barton explained in May 2014 that Kalis accumulated so much footage that a promotional video, titled In Mono, was released in 2006 and only featured Kalis. Mind Field was the first AWS video to feature Heath Kirchart, Mikey Taylor, Grant Taylor, Dylan Rieder, Omar Salazar, Tyler Bledsoe and Steve Berra.

At the start of January 2011, Flip announced that Saari had rejoined the team and released an image that featured Saari alongside the caption: "Home is Where the Hearto Is". Saari spoke about his time as an Alien Workshop rider and also relayed his brief conversation with Carter that followed his decision to return to Flip:

Riding for Alien was great; like, there wasn't any bad vibes or anything. I really liked the company, I really liked everyone involved in it and I became friends with everyone. And when you got to quit a company like that, you wanna blow your brains out, you know? I only spoke to Carter and that's probably, like, one of the hardest calls I had to make and just talked to him and he was, like, "Well, fuck man, it's a bummer, but it's, like, you gotta do what you gotta do."

On January 10, 2012, Skateboarder magazine announced Dyrdek's purchase of Alien Workshop and DNA Distribution from Burton Snowboards. Following Dyrdek's acquisition of DNA Distribution, the official press release stated that "Carter will continue to oversee DNA Distribution in Dayton, Ohio, while Dyrdek will consult directly on all marketing and creative from his Los Angeles based office." In August of the same year, the brand released a series of skateboard decks, wheels, apparel, and stickers that featured the art of Keith Haring.

On May 1, 2013, two senior skateboard team members Jason Dill and Anthony Van Engelen (AVE) publicly announced their departure from Alien Workshop. The press release stated: "Our decision to leave the Workshop is painfully difficult ... It will always be the greatest times of our lives ... The time we spent growing up with the Alien Workshop. Thank you Dyrdek. Thank you Carter. Thank you Mike Hill. Sincerely, Dill and AVE."

On September 3, 2013, Mike "Mikey" Taylor announced his departure from the company after eleven years as a team member. Taylor revealed the news on his Instagram account and explained:

It saddens me to announce that recently Alienworkshop and I have decided to part ways. It's crazy to think how fast 11 years has gone by. I had met @robdyrdek when I was a kid way before I was sponsored, so it was pretty surreal when he called me and asked me to be pro on his company Seek. The last 8 years with AWS have been great and I just wanted to say thank you to Rob, Chris Carter, and Mike Hill for everything you've done for me. I wish you guys the best!!

A press release announced on October 2, 2013 that Dyrdek would continue as a minority shareholder of parent company DNA, following an acquisition by Pacific Vector Holdings (PVH), a company that also owned the Gatorz sunglasses and No Fear clothing brands. The closing of the transaction occurred on October 7, 2013 and the controlling interest was purchased for the issuance of 250,000 stock options and US$1.5 million in the form of an earnout. In the press release, Dyrdek stated: "The DNA Brands are in great hands ... the possibilities are limitless."

Following the release of the Nike Skateboarding (Nike SB) video Two Up, produced by Chris Middlebrook and the Australian Nike SB team, the recruitment of Alex Campbell to Alien Workshop was confirmed. Campbell, a native of Perth, Western Australia, formerly rode for the 4 Skateboard company and is seen riding AWS skateboard decks in the video and thanks the brand in the credits.

=== 2014 - 2016: Post-closure analysis, revival planning, relaunch ===
On May 19, 2014, the "I Don't Know, Man" Tumblr blog, written by Willy Staley, published an article explaining that Alien Workshop had ceased operating as a functional company in mid-May 2014 and Staley, titling the post "How Alien Workshop Died, Maybe", provided a comprehensive history of Alien Workshop since Dyrdek's acquisition. On May 15, 2014, PVH published a "corporate update" and a "bi-weekly Default Status Report in accordance with National Policy 12-203 - Cease Trade Orders for Continuous Defaults ("NP 12-203")" on the TMX Money website, explaining that significant debt issues had led to structural changes and interested investors from Toronto, Ontario, Canada may also be of assistance. In addition to the closure of Alien Workshop, PVH closed 18 under-performing retail locations, eliminated 14 head office positions and negotiated temporary salary reductions with certain management personnel, resulting in a total cost saving of US$722,000 annually. However, Staley concluded his post with the statement: "I’m not qualified to say what happened to Alien Workshop, because I don’t sit on the board of PVH, and PVH’s filings don’t mention DNA."

In a radio interview with Thrasher magazine, published on May 20, 2014, Johnson said to host Jake Phelps: "We got fired ... I didn't hear from my Pacific Vector representative." On May 29, 2014, Barton published a tribute to the company as part of his "Top 5 YouTubes Of The Week" segment—Barton's first selection was Dyrdek's part in Memory Screen and he dedicated the selection "to a company that I was always happy to feature here, I just never thought a reason would be goodbye. Let’s start at the very beginning in 1991 with “Day one baby!” Rob Dyrdek and his part in Memory Screen."

A screening of an original VHS video tape copy of Memory Screen was held on June 10, 2014, with Carter and Pitre in attendance. The screening occurred at the Spectacle Theater in Brooklyn, New York, U.S. and both Carter and Pitre answered questions afterwards. An edited video of the Q&A session was published on the NY Skateboarding website.

A statement from Castrucci was published on the Mostly Skateboarding Tumblr page on May 23, 2014 in regard to the future of Habitat:

Times are weird, that’s for sure. I can’t really speak for AWS but I know myself and the [Habitat] skate team are still unified and we have good respectable options for the future. There are just legal and financial details we are working through at the moment with the I.P. (Investment partner). I’m feeling pretty stoked for Habitat’s future though. I’m sure things will look much different but I love change, so I’m not that mad at it. I’ll keep you posted as things progress! Thanks, Joe

Dyrdek participated in an interview with the ESPN media company and revealed that Alien Workshop is merely in a period of hiatus, among other topics of significance to the global skateboarding culture. Dyrdek explained the situation clearly and without ambiguity:

Ultimately, I just bought it [Alien Workshop] back and relaunched Habitat [skateboard company] a couple months ago and plan on relaunching Alien in the near future. Alien takes a different strategy because the guys I've done Alien with I've known my entire life, and they wanted a little bit of a transition. Basically, we've restructured both companies and we have the right setup now where they will run real lean, and that's the way they need to be for the modern market. They'll be around for another 50 years.

In 2015, Alien Workshop was resurfaced by Hill under TumYeto Distribution; Carter is no longer involved, as his sole focus was the now defunct Reflex Bearings brand. On October 29, 2015, Thrasher Magazine premiered Alien Workshop's sixth video, Bunker Down and Yaje Popson was added to the team in early 2016.

=== 2016 onward: Operations return to Ohio ===
In July 2016 it was announced that the relationship with Tum-Yeto was being phased out and operations would be returned fully to Ohio.

In September 2016 Alien Workshop released a video part for new team rider Frankie Spears called Bigly.

In early 2017 the Workshop promoted team riders Yaje Popson and Joey Guevara and released pro model boards for the occasion. These were the first pro models since the brand's 2015 relaunch. Shortly following the release of the boards Mike Hill, the artist and current force (with Matt Williams) behind the Workshop gave an extensive interview to Thrasher, speaking about the demise and rebirth of the brand, his art, his community vision for the Bunker - where operations are headquartered. Hill also spoke about his collaboration with Supreme and noted that Rob Dyrdek is no longer involved in Alien Workshop operations.

== Videography ==
- Memory Screen (1991)
- Timecode (1997)
- Photosynthesis (2000)
- Kalis in Mono promotional video (2006)
- Mind Field (2009)
- Bunker Down (2015)

=== Life Splicing series ===
The company introduced a web-based video series, entitled Life Splicing, in early 2011, with each segment featuring a montage of the brand's riders and artistic filming/production techniques—videographers included Greg Hunt, Benny Maglinao, and Cody Green. Alien Workshop described the series as "a series of short films, featuring teamriders, artists and friends." Transworld Skateboarding magazine praised the series, stating that "... the Workshop straight nails it in the art department. Alien’s recent Life Splicing clips haven taken the dime-a-dozen video platform of the meat grinder known as the Internet and transformed it into a full-on fine art gallery."

- Life Splicing No. 001: Kevin Terpening (2011)
- Life Splicing No. 002: Life In A Box (2011)
- Life Splicing No. 003: EXP (2011)
- Life Splicing No. 004: Nick Boserio (2011)
- Life Splicing No. 005: Gilbert Crockett (2011)
- Life Splicing No. 006: John Fitzgerald (2012)
