= Stevie Williams =

American skateboarder (born 1979)

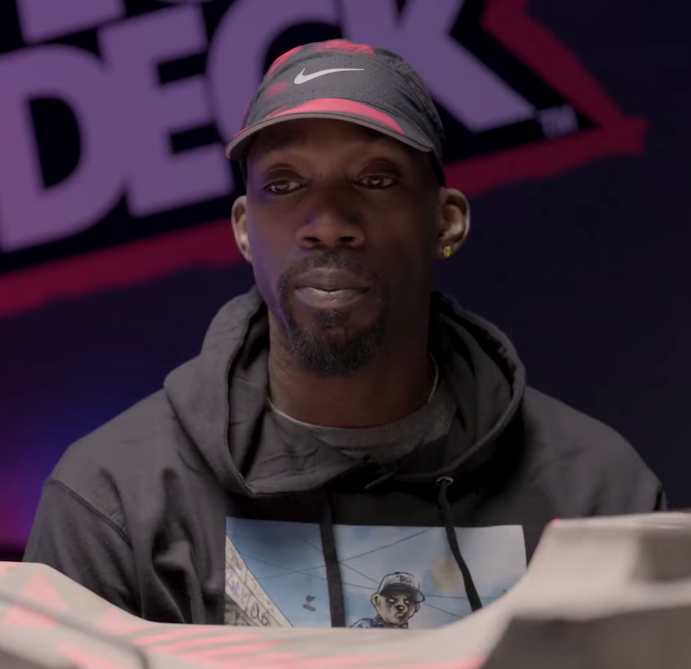
- Williams in 2023

Personal information
- Born: December 17, 1979 (age 46) Philadelphia, Pennsylvania, U.S.
- Occupation: Professional skateboarder
- Years active: 1994–present

Sport
- Country: United States
- Sport: Skateboarding
- Turned pro: 1999

Stevie Williams (born December 17, 1979) is an American professional skateboarder who was included in the twenty-seventh position of the "30 Most Influential Skaters of All Time" list that was compiled by Transworld Skateboarding in late 2011.

== Early life ==
Williams grew up in Philadelphia, Pennsylvania, and started skateboarding at the age of eleven. It was during the period when Williams began skateboarding that the term "dirty ghetto kids" first emerged, as the title was applied to Williams and his friends. At the age of fourteen, Williams left Philadelphia to hitchhike to California.

== Professional skateboarding ==
At the age of 12 years, Williams and his group of friends met Jeff Pang, a skater who was with the Element brand at the time. Williams asked Pang how he could become an Element team member and subsequently filmed a video part for the 1994 Element video Fine Artists Vol. 1, in which he was named "Lil' Stevie". Williams's part was filmed entirely in Philadelphia.

After appearing in the 1999 Zoo York promotional video, Heads, Williams joined both the Chocolate Skateboards team and the DC Shoes team during the same year. Williams filmed a full part that appeared in the 1999 Chocolate Tour video and released a signature model shoe with DC in 2000.

Williams appeared in the 2003 DC Shoes video The DC Video prior to commencing his own company with the assistance of his business partner, Eli Soto, who had collaborated with Williams on the Gold Wheels brand. The pair eventually formed the distribution company Kayo Corp with Troy Morgan, and released the first Kayo promotional video in 2004. Following the 13-minute promotional video, Kayo then released It's Official in 2006, in which the four key brands of the company were introduced in video form: DGK, Organika, Expedition and Gold.

Williams received sponsorship from Casio's G-Shock brand around 2009 and has released two signature watches with the company. In a 2012 promotional video Williams explained his decision to represent G-Shock: "The reason I identify with G-Shock? The toughness, the street credibility, the colorways, the ethics, and the legacy is, is definitely what I would want to be in my brain when I think of G-Shock—complements everything I've done in my career." Williams represented the G-Shock brand in January 2013, visiting Berlin, Germany, as an ambassador during the brand's thirtieth anniversary celebration, for which it opened a "pop-up" store in the European city.

Following the demise of the DGK-Reebok partnership, Williams was without a shoe sponsor for a prolonged period—he released a guest shoe model with the ALife brand during this period—and was eventually signed by the Supra brand in early 2011. Williams released his first signature shoe, entitled the "S1W", for Supra in mid-2012, with an accompanying video.

Alongside professional skateboarders Arto Saari, Brandon Biebel, and Tony Alva, Williams completed a photo and video shoot for Playboy that was shot in 2013 by Irish photographer Tony Kelly. The shoot is entitled "Playboy Poolside" and features the four subjects skateboarding in and around an empty swimming pool.

Williams collaborated with Supra on the "Estaban" signature shoe model that will be released in July 2014. Williams explained in a June 25, 2014 interview: "This is without a doubt my most style-driven and innovative design since my first pro shoe ... Growing up, I’d always wear three-quarter length mid tops. They’re the most stylish to me. The way they looked when I skated, with my jeans, when I was hanging out, they always looked the best."

=== DGK ===
Williams is the founder and co-owner of Dirty Ghetto Kids (DGK) skateboards, an American skateboard company. The brand is distributed by the Kayo Corp company, a partnership that was established through Williams's friendship with Troy Morgan from Kayo.

In 2004, Williams's manager, Peter Golden, negotiated a contract with Reebok, whereby Williams was subsequently sponsored by the shoe company. Golden and Williams worked with Reebok to design a complete product line, including DGK skate shoes and clothing—the collection was named "RBK-DGK". Williams was the first professional skateboarder to be sponsored by Reebok. Williams was later asked to contribute to the design of the "Flipside" Air Jordan skate sneaker, produced by Nike, Inc.

Williams announced the establishment of the "Da Playground" indoor training facility in 2011—the facility is located in Atlanta, Georgia, and its main purpose is to provide a location for the DGK team to skate. However, footage that has been filmed inside the facility has also featured non-DGK skateboarders.

Williams explained the ethos of both himself and DGK in a 2013 interview with the European skateboard publication, Kingpin—the importance of fun, friendship, and community is highlighted:

I like reminiscing about the things that made me psyched on skating as a kid, it helps me go out there and keep doing it. The problem with most videos these days is that they just show how challenging skateboarding is, rather than showing how fun it is. I don’t have time for that shit. It feels like they are going too far, we’ve got to go back in time ... It just doesn’t look fun anymore. I think that’s why the DGK video was so successful. We would go out all together, skate the same spots and you can actually see that we are having a bunch of fun.

The DGK team was selected for the "Best Team" award at the 15th Annual Transworld SKATEboarding Awards that is produced by Transworld SKATEboarding magazine; the award followed a sixteen-page feature in TransWorld SKATEboarding magazine‘s April 2012 issue and the full-length video Parental Advisory, in which every team member contributed a full video part Williams stated in a June 2014 interview that he considers DGK his "biggest accomplishment" in skateboarding at that point in time.

=== Sponsors ===
Williams is sponsored by DGK, Supra, G-Shock, 9five Eyewear, Gold, Grizzly Griptape, Venture, Diamond Supply Co., Beats by Dre, Bones Bearings, and Asphalt Yacht Club (AYC).

=== Skateboarding influences ===
During the Transworld interview that was in relation to his placement in the magazine's "Most Influential" list, whereby he attained the twenty-seventh position, Williams identified the five skateboarders that he believed have been the most influential: Rodney Mullen ("number one ... everybody owes their technical support to Rodney Mullen"); "number two, Daewon Song"; "number three, Guy Mariano"; "four", Henry Sanchez; "... and five, I'll just leave dangling for all of us". Williams was then asked to select a single top influence—"the most influential skateboarder of all time"—and he replied, "I will have to give it to Rodney Mullen ... out of a respect of what he's created."

In 2013, Williams has identified former Underworld Element rider Curtis McCann as his all-time favorite European skateboarder, while also explaining that he continues to focus on older skateboard videos from his youth, such as Questionable, Love Child, and Tim and Henry's Pack of Lies, for inspiration and enjoyment.

=== Influence ===
In regard to his own influence on skateboarding, Williams has stated:

I don't know—I always just been a skateboarder ... me and my friends used to always get teased, "Oh, you're not a real skater; why you wearing Nikes or Reeboks?" ... I can't really be laughed at so much—I'm already riding a skateboard ... I guess, like, the other kids that can, kind of, relate to Stevie Williams—I won't even say, like, black; I'll just say urban kids—that would be, like, "Yo, I can still be myself, and still be skating, and do dah, dah, dah".

Williams revealed an unusual griptape technique for the purpose of a lighter skateboard deck in July 2013, explaining that he only uses four bolts to attach the trucks to the deck (eight bolts are typically used) and lays the griptape over the top of the bolts, rather than underneath them.

In a July 2013 interview with the Berrics website, DGK professional Keelan Dadd explained the influence of Williams upon his own skateboarding:

Stevie was one of the dudes I really first recognized and could relate to. I was that little kid with baggy clothes and a little chain just doing what I wanted to do ... People would hit me up on him as I was going and then once I understood skateboarding more, I was like "damn, Stevie's tight as shit". It was dope. Stevie is one of my favorite skaters.

== Business owner ==
In 2006, Williams opened the skate shop L&K Limited in Oceanside, California, US, together with Nick Lockman, and in 2008, he opened the skate shop Sk8tique in Atlanta, Georgia, US. In the press release for the launch of the Atlanta store, Sk8tique was described as a "skate boutique [that] offers a fusion between the urban and skating communities and gear provided by DGK, The Kayo Corp and other select brands". Williams founded the clothing brand Asphalt Yacht Club (AYC) in 2013 and it was launched in July 2013 with a team that includes Stefan Janoski and Nyjah Huston.

In 2023, Williams launched SK8PES, an NFT project described as "Pioneering urban anime and web3 lifestyle | by @steviewilliams_". The project is scheduled to mint summer of 2023.

== Charity work ==
Through the "Save A Heart, Save A Mind" organization that she founded, Williams's mother, Susan Williams, has held charity events at skate parks in California, US. The DGK website explains, "Susan holds events to help the disadvantaged youth and young adults in the Los Angeles area." In 2011, Susan Williams held an event at a North Hollywood skate park and in 2012, the organization visited Pedlow Park in southern California's Encino area.

The DGK team was also involved in the launch of the Next Up Foundation's (a (c)3 Non-Profit, Charitable Organization of California) program at the "Boys and Girls" club of Long Beach, California, US. DGK team members, Derrick Wilson, Dane Vaughn, Marcus McBride, Matty "Schmatty" Chaffin, and Lenny Rivas, assisted the foundation—"a resource for kids and teens in underserved communities providing guidance through action sports activities, supplying athletic equipment, mentoring and supervision—on January 22, 2013.

== Free Fabes campaign ==
On October 5, 2012, Williams's company, DGK, launched the "Free Fabes" campaign to raise legal fees for close friend and former professional skateboarder, Fabian Alomar. A member of the now-defunct brand, Menace, Alomar was arrested and detained on a drug possession charge and faces a lengthy sentence due to California's "3-strike" legislation. Williams appeared in a video segment, alongside Alomar, to promote the campaign. An unseen video part from Alomar, filmed during the height of his career, was published on the internet as part of the campaign.

== Video game appearances ==
Williams is a featured character in multiple video games including: Evolution Skateboarding, Tony Hawk's American Wasteland, making him the second playable African American professional skater in the Tony Hawk games after Kareem Campbell. He later appeared in Tony Hawk's Project 8, Tony Hawk's Proving Ground, Tony Hawk: Ride, and Tony Hawk: Shred. He was also a hidden character for the game NFL Street 2, where he was the captain of his own team, "Team Reebok" with his signature DGK Logo. His position on the game was a wide receiver. Stevie appeared in MTV Sports: Skateboarding Featuring Andy Macdonald.

== Biographical Chronicle ==
On February 23, 2021, X Games Premiered "BEING STEVIE WILLIAMS" a Video Chronicle about his journey from the streets of Philadelphia to successful entrepreneur and icon.

== Television ==
Year	Title	Role	Notes
2007	The Game	Himself	"The Truth Hurts" (season 2: episode 8)

== Filmography ==
Year	Title	Role	Notes
2007	Beef IV	Himself	

== Videography ==
Year	Title	Role	Notes
1994	Element: Fine Artists Vol. 1	Himself	
1994	411VM - Issue 9	Himself	
1997	FTC: Video III	Himself	
1999	Transworld: The Reason	Himself	
1999	Chocolate: The Chocolate Tour	Himself	
1999	Zoo York: Heads	Himself	
2000	Transworld: Anthology	Himself	
2000	CKY2K	Himself	
2002	Gold: Got Gold?	Himself	
2003	411VM - Issue 60	Himself	
2003	Closure	Himself	
2003	Logic - Issue 14: Contrast	Himself	
2003	DC: The DC Video	Himself	
2004	ON Video - Winter 2004	Himself	
2004	DC: The DC Video (Deluxe Edition)	Himself	
2004	The Kayo Corp: Promo	Himself	
2006	The Kayo Corp: It's Official	Himself	
2011	DGK/Zero: Fresh 'til Death	Himself	
2011	Supra: European Tour	Himself	
2011	DGK: Da Playground	Himself	
2012	DGK: Parental Advisory	Himself	
