= Skate video =

Film genre

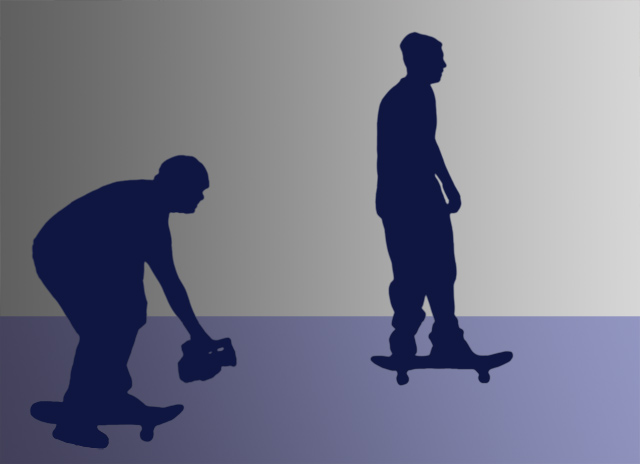
Typical manner of shooting a skate video

A skate video is a movie of or about skateboarding typically showing new tricks and a series of skateboarders in a montage set to music.

== History ==
Released in 1965, the short film Skaterdater is credited as the first film to depict skateboarding and therefore the first skate video. In 2015, The Berrics campaigned for the film's acceptance into the National Film Registry. However, the Powell Peralta company is often credited as creating the first skate videos proper that were not a part of a fictional film or a documentary. Their first video, The Bones Brigade Video Show (1984), was expected to sell just 300 copies on VHS, but it sold 30,000.

From the invention of the skate video genre in the 1980s till the early 2000s, skate videos were distributed via VHS tapes sold primarily at skate shops. In the early 2000s skate videos transferred to DVDs along with the rest of the home video market. The advent of social media and new digital filmmaking tools such as Instagram and YouTube challenged skate video traditions, putting less emphasis on full videos and more emphasis on shorter clips. The conventions and styles of skate videos continue to evolve and redefine themselves alongside the sport of skateboarding.

=== Producers ===
There is a variety of skate videos that are produced, from independent individual filmmakers to those commissioned by skateboard companies who use the video to promote the brand. Additionally, small skate shops, magazines, websites, collectives, and independent skaters make skate videos for the love of skateboarding; as well as, promotional material.

411 Video Magazine was a popular bi-monthly video log published from the 1990s to the 2000s.

Film director Spike Jonze has shot several skate videos, including Blind's Video Days (1991) and Girl and Chocolate's Yeah Right! (2003).

Throughout the late 2010s and into the 2020s, filmmaker William Strobeck has developed a style of producing skate videos which goes against traditional skate video conventions such as the use of fisheye lenses and sequential sectioned parts in favour of a more experimental approach.

Many amateur skateboarders hold professional skate videos in high regard, and as authentic representations of skateboarding, and attempt to create their own videos. Amateur and professional skateboarding videos are often shared via social media.

== Content and style ==
In most skate videos, skaters show their skills in sections called video parts, but other formats and techniques, such as montages, are used, and new tricks are often demonstrated. It is common to have the best highlight trick as the final trick in video parts, this is referred to as the ender.

Most videos feature "slam sections" of tricks that end up in failure and spectacular falls where the skateboarder is hurt. They are macabre yet popular because they serve as a reminder that skateboarding is a dangerous sport. Another common feature is sections covering skateboarders off the board, covering their personalities.

Although skate videos vary in aesthetic style and content, there are several common denominators. They are usually anything from half an hour to an hour long, feature skateboarders performing tricks in urban environments, and are edited to include song-length segments. Ultimately, producers try to promote their idea of skate style, achieved by montage and editing.

One of the most common camera used to shoot skate videos in the late 90s and early 2000s was the Sony DCR-VX1000 which is still used today by some filmmakers. Often the videos are shot using a fisheye lens. Skate videos are also notable for featuring music soundtracks of punk rock, alternative rock, or hip-hop music.

Other actions sports for example aggressive inline skating, BMX, scootering, snowboarding and fingerboarding have copied the skate video formula of video parts; trick montages set to music to create their own skate videos of their respective sport sometimes featuring multiple sports.

== Notable skate videos ==
=== 1980s ===
- The Bones Brigade Video Show (Powell Peralta, 1984)
- Skatevisions (Vision Street Wear, 1984)
- Future Primitive (Powell Peralta, 1985)
- Wheels of Fire (Santa Cruz, 1987)
- The Search for Animal Chin (Powell Peralta, 1987)
- Sick Boys (Mack Dawg, 1988)
- H-Street - Shackle me not (H-Street, 1988)
- Speed Freaks (Santa Cruz, 1989)
- Streets on Fire (Santa Cruz, 1989)

=== 1990s ===
- Video Days (Blind, 1991)
- Memory Screen (Alien Workshop, 1991)
- Love Child (World Industries, 1992)
- Questionable (Plan B B1992)
- Mouse (Girl, 1996)
- Welcome to Hell (Toy Machine, 1996)
- Fulfill the Dream (Shortys, 1998)

=== 2000s ===
- Menikmati (éS, 2000)
- Photosynthesis (Alien Workshop, 2000)
- Dying to Live (Zero, 2002)
- Sorry (Flip, 2002)
- PJ Ladd's Wonderful, Horrible, Life (Coliseum Skate Shop, 2002)
- The DC Video (DC, 2003)
- Yeah Right! (Girl, 2003)
- This Is Skateboarding (Emerica, 2003)
- Getting Nowhere Faster (Element, 2004)
- Baker 3 (Baker Skateboards, 2005)
- Cheese & Crackers (Almost, 2006)
- Bag Of Suck (Enjoi, 2006)

=== 2010s ===
- Skateboarding Is Forever (DC, 2010)
- Video nasty (Heroin skateboards, 2013)
- Propeller (Vans, 2015)
