= Supreme (brand) =

American skateboarding lifestyle brand

- Type: Subsidiary
- Industry: Clothing
- Founded: 1994; 32 years ago
- Founder: James Jebbia (Founder & CEO)
- Headquarters: New York City, US
- Number of locations: 17
- Products: Clothing, shoes, accessories, skateboards
- Revenue: ▲US$538 million (2024)
- Operating income: US$116 million (2024)
- Net income: ▼US$64.8 million (2023)
- Parent: VF Corporation (2020–2024); EssilorLuxottica (2024–present)
- Website: supreme.com

Supreme is an American clothing brand established in Manhattan, New York City, in April 1994. The company focuses on streetwear, skateboarding, and hip-hop fashion trends. Supreme has been described as one of the most influential streetwear brands globally.

== History ==
The brand was founded in 1994 by American-British businessman and fashion designer James Jebbia. During the formation of the brand, Jebbia was inspired by a book on Barbara Kruger's artwork, which influenced the design of Supreme's red box logo with a white Futura Heavy Oblique font.

The first store was opened in a former office space on Lafayette Street in Lower Manhattan in April 1994. It featured a layout that accommodated skateboarding and a selection of clothes arranged around the store's perimeter. The store's first employees included skaters and actors, such as Justin Pierce and Harold Hunter, as well as other cast members from the Larry Clark film Kids. Jebbia said that he opened Supreme in Lower Manhattan because there were few options for buying skateboarding products in that area at the time.

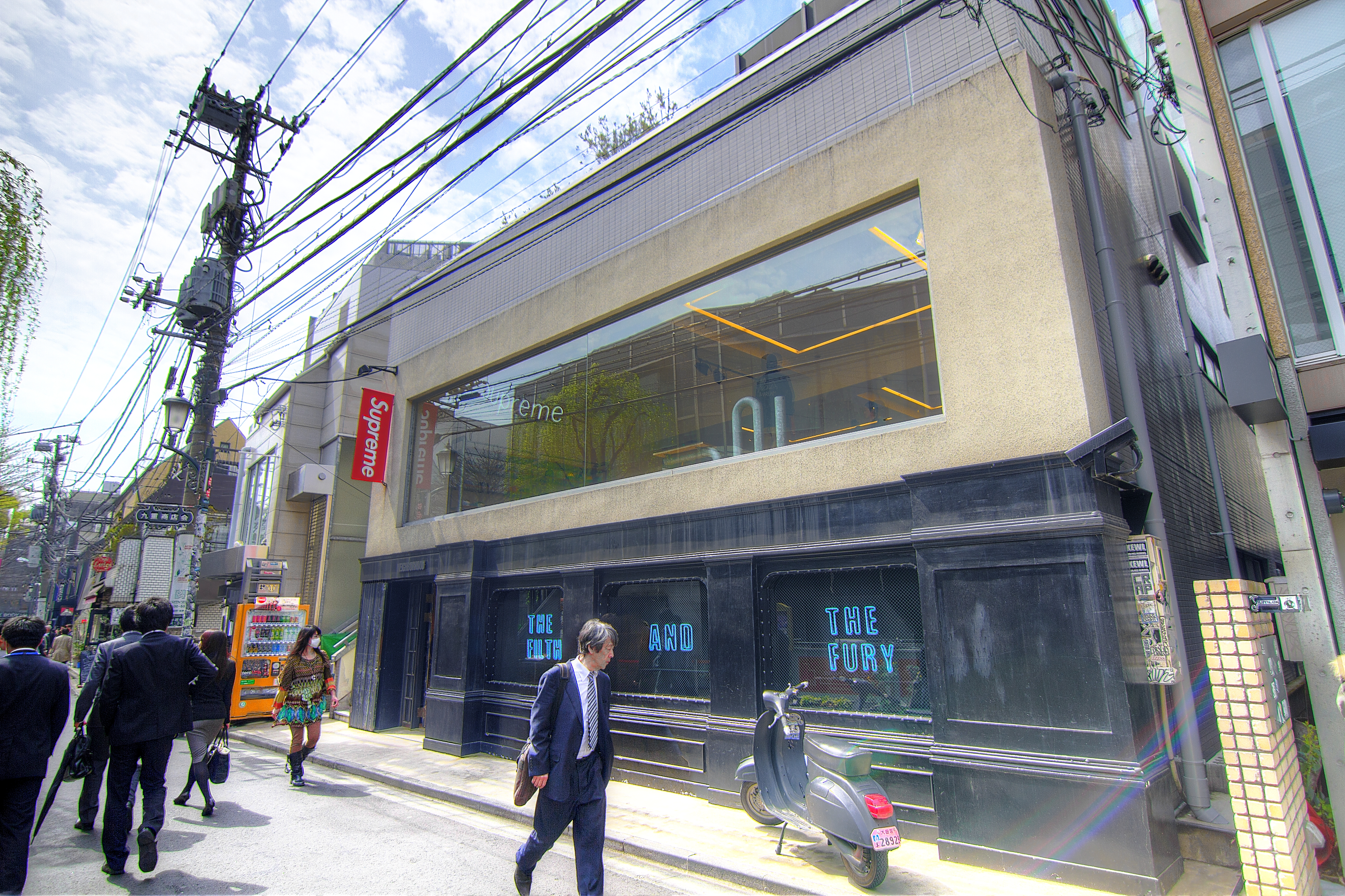
Supreme store in Tokyo.

In 2004, a second location was opened on North Fairfax Avenue in Los Angeles. This store was nearly double the size of the original New York City store. Other locations include London, which opened in September 2011; Paris, which opened in 2016; Tokyo (Harajuku, Daikanyama and Shibuya); Nagoya; Osaka; and Fukuoka. More recently, Berlin and Milan opened in 2021, Chicago opened in 2022, Seoul opened in 2023, and Shanghai opened in 2024. The additional locations emulate the original Lafayette Street store's design.

In February 2019, Supreme moved their flagship store at 274 Lafayette Street to a new location at 190 Bowery. In November 2020, VF Corporation announced that they agreed to buy Supreme in an all-cash deal for $2.1 billion. VF Corporation bought out all outside investors, as well as founder James Jebbia. In 2024, Supreme was sold to the eyewear company and Ray-Ban owner, EssilorLuxottica, in July 2024 for $1.5 billion. Jebbia continues to manage the business.

== Skate teams ==
The original Supreme skate team consisted of Ryan Hickey, Justin Pierce, Gio Estevez, Paul Leung, Chris Keefe, Jones Keefe, Peter Bici, and Mike Hernandez. Other skaters, such as Harold Hunter and Jeff Pang, became associates of the company.

Supreme's skate team has included Jason Dill, Sean Pablo, Sage Elsesser, Aidan Mackey, Tyshawn Jones, Na-Kel Smith, Kevin Bradley, Mark Gonzales, Ben Kadow, Kevin Rodrigues, Vincent Touzery, Rowan Zorilla, Nik Stain, Kader Sylla, Caleb Barnett, Beatrice Domond, Seven Strong, Troy Gipson, Kris Brown, Sully Cormier, Patrick O'Mara, Zion Effs and Joseph Campos.

== Marketing and awards ==
Supreme stocks its own clothing label, as well as other skateboard and footwear brands such as Vans, Nike SB, Spitfire Wheels, Thrasher, and Anti-Hero. Supreme releases two collections each year. Instead of offering the entire line at once, the brand releases small groups of products online and in-store from the current season's collection every Thursday. Supreme invented this retail model known as "drops", which is now widely used in the industry.

William "Bill" Strobeck serves as Supreme's main filmmaker and produced several short films for the brand including Joyride (2014), Swoosh (2015), and King Puppy (2016). Strobeck has filmed and directed both of Supreme's full-length films, Cherry (2014) and Blessed (2018). In 2018, Supreme was awarded the Council of Fashion Designers of America's Menswear Designer of the Year Award. In July 2024, Supreme was described as a digital first business with 17 retail stores across the United States, Asia and Europe.

== Collaborations ==
=== Commercial and brand collaborations ===
Supreme is known for its range of "unconventional brand collaborations" from video games (Mortal Kombat) to porcelain objects (Meissen) and jewelry (Jacob & Co.).

Supreme frequently works with visual artists (among them Jeff Koons, Richard Prince, Damien Hirst, John Baldessari, Nan Goldin, and Robert Longo), and musicians (including Public Enemy, Black Sabbath, Slayer, Three 6 Mafia, Aphex Twin, and Mobb Deep among others, and brands who have had an impact on youth culture. Supreme has also worked with Disney, Major League Baseball, Johnson & Johnson, General Mills, and many other major American brands.

Among its collaborative projects Supreme has produced a series of "Photo Tees" featuring photographs of iconic individuals wearing Supreme's classic box logo T-Shirt, including: Kate Moss, Kermit the Frog, Three 6 Mafia, Lou Reed, Lady Gaga, Neil Young, Gucci Mane, Nas, Playboi Carti, Mike Tyson, Lee "Scratch" Perry, and Morrissey among others.

In addition Supreme has worked with many photographers to create imagery for the brand, among them, Kenneth Cappello, Deana Lawson, Shaniqwa Jarvis, Gunner Stahl, Glen Luchford, and Terry Richardson.

In 2020, Supreme and American food brand Nabisco collaborated on a "double stuf" Oreo cookie in the brand's signature red color and with the brand's logo printed on the cookie. Within a week of the collaboration launch, the cookies were selling on eBay for more than $91,000, after retailing in store for just $3. In 2020, and again in 2022, Supreme collaborated with make-up artist Pat McGrath to create a lipstick and nail polish in the former's iconic colors.

=== Artist collaborations ===
Supreme's first artist collaboration was with Rammellzee in 1994, the year the brand opened its first store in New York City; the partnership produced hand-painted trucker hats and backpacks. In 2020, Supreme partnered with artist Takashi Murakami to produce a limited-edition Box Logo Tee, which raised $1 million for COVID-19 pandemic relief efforts.

Other visual artists who have collaborated with Supreme include Charlie Ahearn, Ralph Bakshi, Pedro Bell, Larry Clark, George Condo, Martha Cooper, Cost, R. Crumb, Chris Cunningham,Dondi, Erik Foss, Futura, Nan Goldin, Gonz, Damien Hirst, JA, Daniel Johnston, KAWS, Mike Kelley, Harmony Korine, Wilfred Limonious, David Lynch, M.C. Escher, Ari Marcopoulos, Malcolm McLaren, Shawn Mortensen, Raymond Pettibon, Richard Prince, Lee Quiñones, Peter Saville, Andres Serrano, Dash Snow, Aphex Twin, Joel-Peter Witkin, and Martin Wong, contributing graphics, sculpture, and mixed media to limited-edition collections.

== Fashion ==
Supreme has partnered with various fashion designers and luxury brands throughout its history including Comme des Garçons (2012, 2013, 2014, 2015, and 2018), Yohji Yamamoto (2020, 2022, and 2025), Undercover (2015, 2016, 2018, and 2023) Jean-Paul Gaultier (2019), Tiffany and Co. (2021), Stone Island (2014, 2015, 2016, 2017, 2019, 2020, 2022, and 2023), Burberry (2022), and Martine Rose (2024).

In 2017, Supreme partnered with Louis Vuitton, in a collaboration that was the first of its kind with a luxury fashion house and a skateboard brand. The collection was featured in the Louis Vuitton runway show during Paris Fashion Week in January 2017, and later that year the collection appeared in Louis Vuitton pop-up shops and stores in Sydney, Seoul, Tokyo, Beijing, Paris, London, Miami, and Los Angeles.

== Legal disputes ==
In 2013, Supreme sued Leah McSweeney and her brand Married to the Mob for alleged infringement of its box logo. McSweeney was represented by civil-rights attorney Norman Siegel. Artist Barbara Kruger criticized the dispute, and the case was voluntarily dismissed after three months.

Supreme has also faced international trademark conflicts. A brief period of litigation in Italy and an early EU refusal allowed some non-official "Supreme" goods to be sold in Europe, and a 2018 partnership between Samsung Electronics and a counterfeit "Supreme" brand in China was quickly canceled after backlash. In 2019–2020, the European Union Intellectual Property Office granted Supreme EU-wide trademark protection.
