= Slide (skateboarding) =

Technique in skateboarding

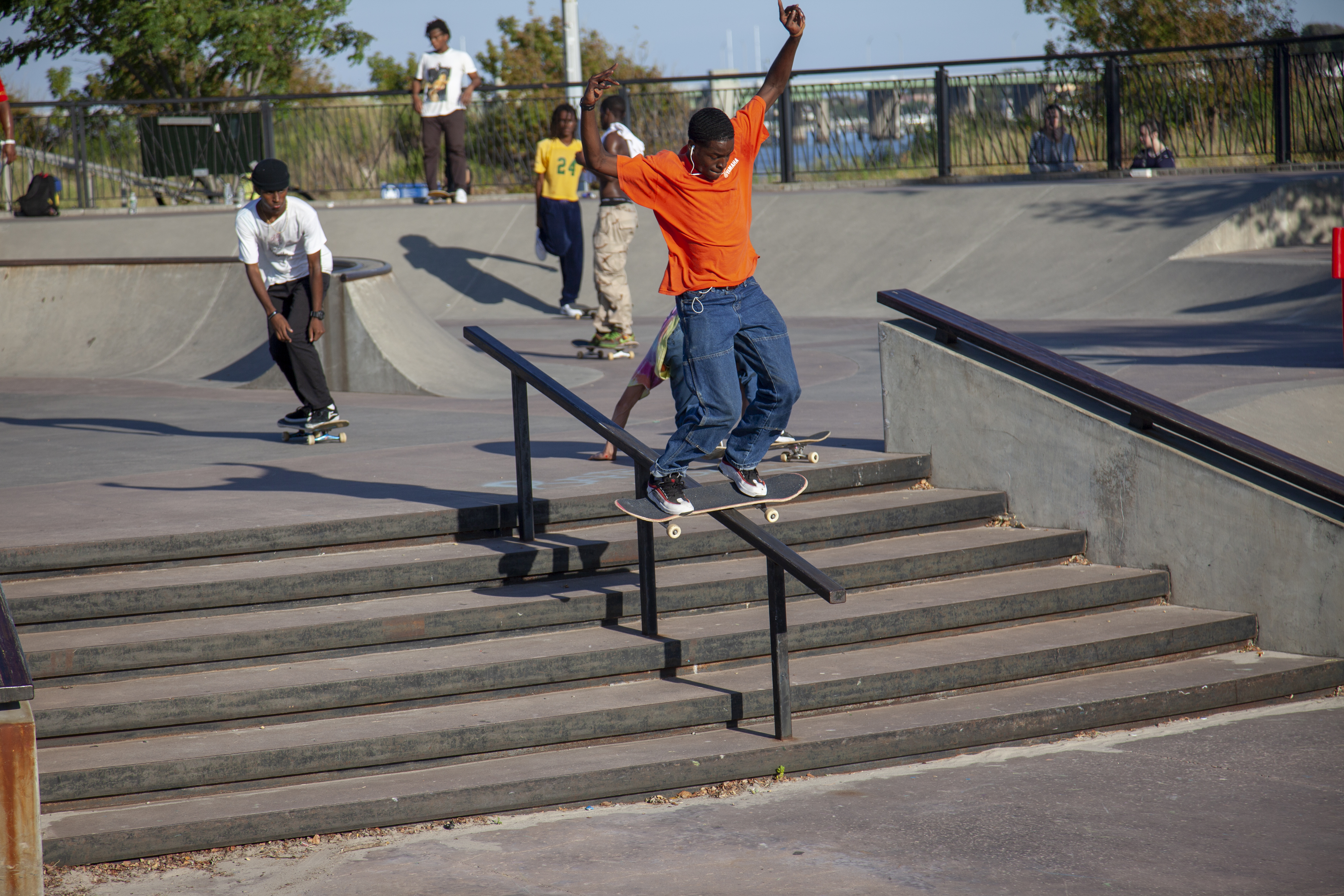
Boardslide at Far Rockaway Skatepark - 2019

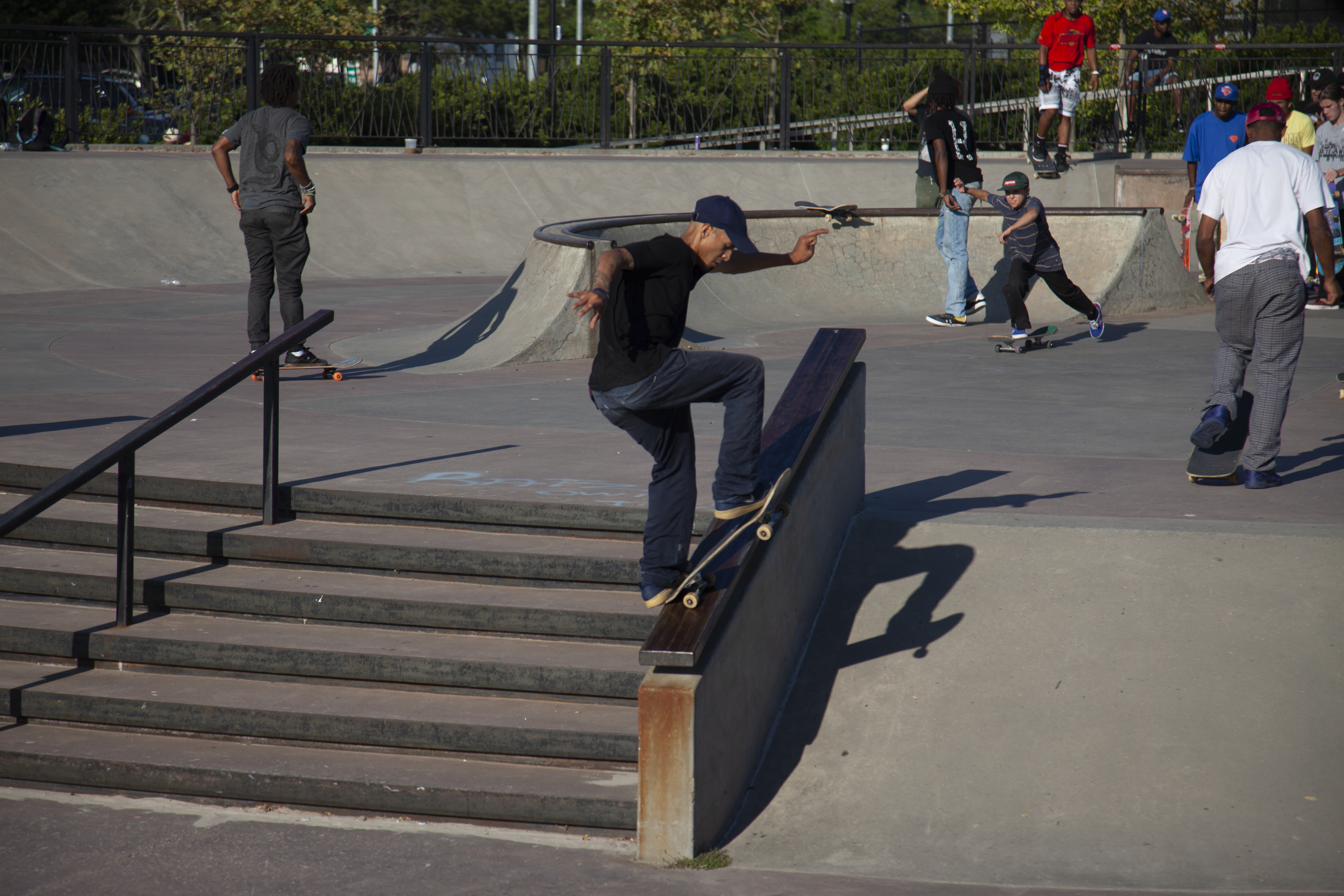
Starlin Polanco with the Frontside Bluntslide at Far Rockaway Skatepark

A slide is a skateboarding trick where the skateboarder slides sideways either on the deck or the trucks.

In 1986, demand for SMA skateboards had grown at an increasing rate which they struggled to meet. At 16, Natas Kaupas impressed Engblom when he arranged a manufacturing and distribution arrangement with the much larger company, Santa Cruz Skateboards. It is claimed by some in the skateboarding community that Kaupas pioneered rail slide manoeuvres in the late 1980s while at a Pro-Am skate contest held in Oceanside, California. Kaupas stunned the crowd by attempting a board slide down a handrail. Although his attempt was unsuccessful, skating history was made. This was followed up when Kaupas and Gonzales performed what is considered the first legitimate rail slide and later with 50-50 grinds.

== Terms of direction ==
Frontside
A slide with the skateboarder's frontside facing the obstacle he or she is sliding on, or the skateboarder is facing the direction of travel when sliding on flat ground. The term heelside derives from the need to lean on the "heelside" of the board to break the traction of your wheels.

Backside
A slide with the skateboarder's back side facing the obstacle he or she is sliding on, or the skateboarder is not facing the direction of travel when sliding on flat ground. The term "toeside" derives from the need to put weight on the toeside of the board to break the traction of your wheels. Toeside slides on flat ground are generally regarded as more difficult, but with rails and ledges the difficulty of direction may vary by trick.

== Slide tricks ==
Anti-Casper Slide
Performed by flipping the board into a nosecasper via half impossible and sliding on the nose in a nose casper position.

Bananaslide
A combination of a tailslide and a nose slide between two obstacles at the same time. Rarely seen as not many obstacles allow you to do this trick

Bertslide
A four-wheeled slide where the skateboarder puts one hand on the ground and rotates the board while it is still on the ground, effectively sliding on the wheels of the skateboard. The trick was named after the surfer, Larry Bertlemann, who performed the trick in his surfing routine. It was then popularized by the Z-Boys, who adapted the move by extending the slide to 360 or even 540 degrees.

Bluntslide
Performed by ollieing over/onto the obstacle and fitting the edge/rail between the tail and back truck of one's skateboard and sliding. Can be performed on flat ground (called a bluntstop) or downhill, possibly with only the tip of the board sliding on the street and all four wheels lifted.

Boardslide / railslide
The board straddles the obstacle perpendicularly as the skateboarder slides along the center of the board. Originally called a slide n’ roll, then later called a rock n’ roll board slide. Most commonly when people refer to boardslides, it is a backside boardslide unless stated otherwise. The basic board slide also goes by many names, like "back board," "bs board," "b-slide," or "sex change," and heavily depends on regional vernacular.

Casperslide
A casperslide is performed by flipping the board into an up-side down state with one foot on the bottom (now top) of the tail and the front foot underneath the front truck (griptape side) and sustaining momentum, thus sliding on the tip of the board's concave. It can be performed on rails (rarely done) or flat ground. Often attributed to Rodney Mullen.

Cess Slide
This is a four-wheeled slide performed on inclines, banks, ditches, and transition. Riders most commonly ride frontside or straight up the transition. At the peak of momentum, the rider unweights the board and slides the back wheels up to 'catch up' with the rest of the body at 90 degrees. Then, as the body's momentum returns, the rider pivots the back truck while sliding the front wheels 90 degrees back toward the bottom of the incline. Simply put, backside shred up, pivot back down - a fun and lazy way of riding transition backside. If you ride up frontside, you do this trick in a backside 'alley-oop' fashion. This is also very common in backyard pool riding, due to the benefits of 'feeling' your way around the cement.

Coleman Slide
This is where a rider wearing sliding gloves performs a frontside slide using their downhill hand with the glove to break the wheels free of traction while swinging the uphill hand close to the body to revert the board back from the initial slide in a pendulum motion. Named after slalom champion and sliding godfather, Cliff Coleman, it is regarded as a staple trick in downhill sliding because it allows riders to see what is coming at them (objects, cars, hazards) all while in control, as well as allow them to slow down. A Coleman slide can also be used to initiate a frontside spin if the rider ends the slide at 180 degrees instead of swinging back to the original stance with a pendulum. If the rider flows into a backside slide with one smooth motion, it is possible to do 360 spins and more.

Crail Slide
This is a tailslide where the skater grabs the nose of the board with the back hand while sliding, and is usually performed on a ramp. It comes from the same idea as the more popular, Lien Slide, in that in both tricks, the skater grabs the board to help put it in position for the tailslide. Since the invention of the Ollie, it has become more common to Ollie into a tailslide.

Darkslide
The darkslide is a seemingly complicated looking trick. The rider approaches a ledge or rail, and does a flip trick onto the obstacle so that the rider lands with the board upside down with their feet on the nose and tail, whilst the board slides across the obstacle. Generally a half-kickflip or half-heelflip is used to get into a darkslide. Created by Mark Gonzales in 1991.

Flat spin
A hands-down rotation in the Surrender position. The slide can either be initiated by diving forward into a surrender slide and slinging the board around with your legs, or by doing a frontside or backside 360 and continuing the spin in a surrender position. Skilled riders can rotate as much as 1440 degrees or even more (there is no official record). Once the technique is perfected, it allows you to rotate fast and slide very far while losing very little momentum due to the rider's weight being on his gloves when his board is sliding and on his board when it is pointing downhill and rolling.

Layback
Also known as a Sergio slide (named after the Brazilian inventor of the move, Sergio Yuppie), a layback is a frontside slide performed while riding downhill by placing your uphill hand on the ground behind the tail of your board and breaking the rear wheels out of traction. From here you can rotate 180 degrees, swing a pendulum, or hold the slide at 90 degrees and thrust your pelvis upward to unweight the board, resulting in a longer slide. The last variation is considered to be the most challenging and stylish, but often results in flat spots on your wheels. Like all hands-down slides, this trick requires slide gloves to be executed at speed.

Lipslide
Similar to a boardslide, but the skater turns 90 degrees so that the trailing trucks are placed over the rail/ledge/coping and the skater slides on the middle of the board. The lipslide is considered to be more complex than a boardslide, due to the rotation over the obstacle at the beginning into the trick and the re-entry or dismount. Note that in this case a frontside lipslide involves facing forwards while a backside lipslide involves facing backwards. Also known as a Disaster slide.

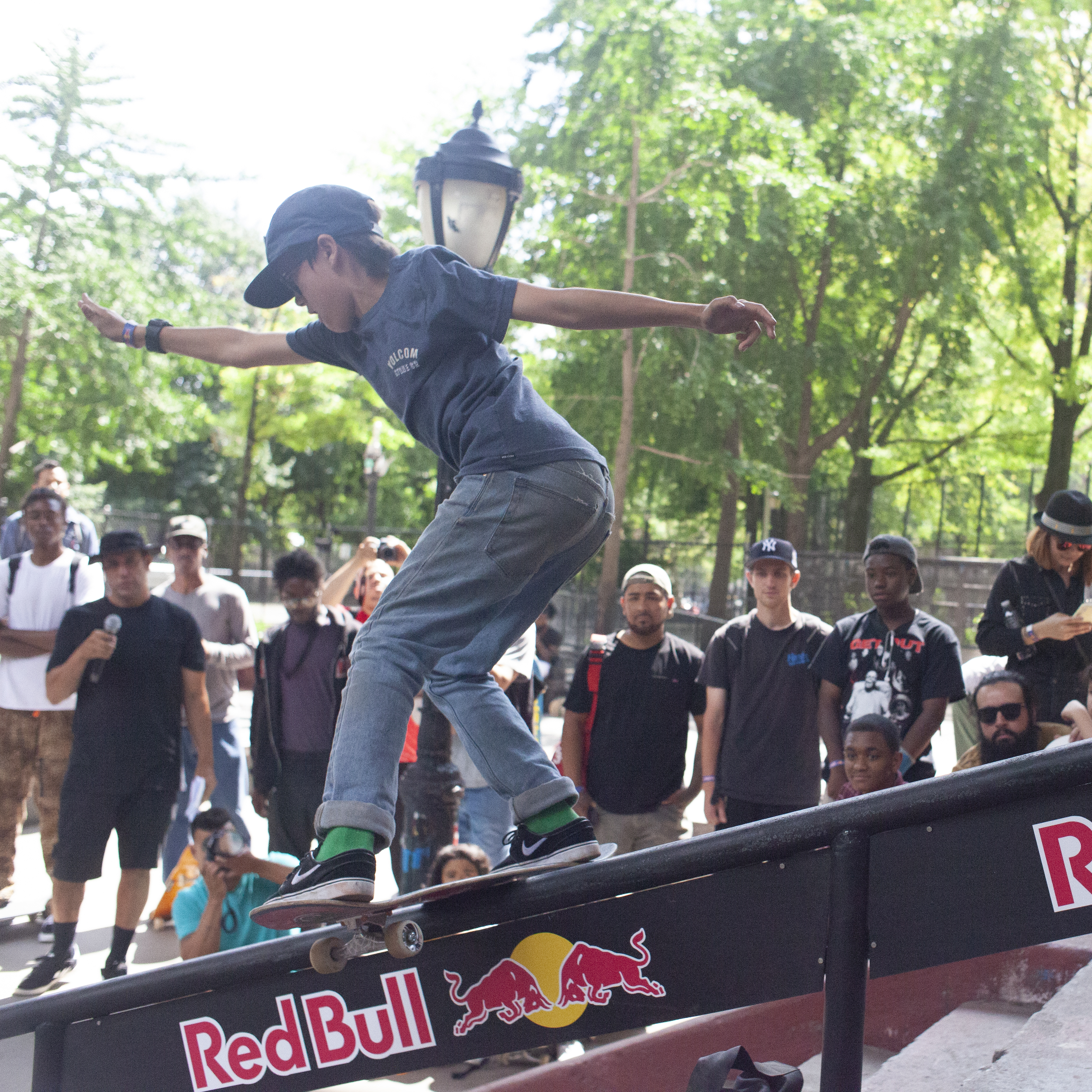
Jiro Platt performs a clean frontside lipslide at LES Skatepark

Noseblunt
Same as a blunt slide, but performed with the nose and the front wheels. 90-degree ollie over the object to be sliding, locking the nose into a slide position. Wheels drag across the ledge/platform like a power slide while the nose slides along the lip. On a rail, the rider 'ollies over' into a nose slide position. The term, noseblunt, in downhill or flatground riding, refers to a powerslide happening on only the front two wheels.

Nose grab tail drag
The skater pops the board into his hand, grabs the nose, and pulls up so that the wheels come off the ground and only the tail is sliding.

Noseslide
A noseslide is performed by riding parallel to an obstacle (ledge, rail, etc...) The skateboarder does an ollie and turns the board 90 degrees. They then land on the ledge with the nose of the board sliding on top of it. This can be done frontside or backside. The skateboarder can then come off the ledge either regular or fakie (riding backwards).

Nose/Tail 5-0 Slides
A 5-0 Slide can be done frontside or backside, with either the front two or the rear two wheels sliding on the ground while the rider is sliding standing up or with his hands on the pavement. If the nose or tail of the board slides on the ground it is considered a bluntslide.

Pendy (Pendulum) Slide
This is a backside slide where the rider puts both hands on the street in front of their toes and extends their body out into a push-up position (you can also keep your knees bent in order to spin around faster), either returning to the original stance with a pendulum or rotating a full 180 degrees. A more difficult variation is to put only your uphill hand on the pavement and slide with your shoulders perpendicular to the ground. Toeside 360s can be done by continuing immediately into a frontside slide after the first 180 degrees.

Powerslide
The powerslide is a four wheel slide usually performed to stop the skateboard. It is performed by gaining speed, and turning the board 90 degrees while leaning the body back. The hands do not touch the ground when performing a powerslide. The skater can also turn the board more than 90 degrees resulting in the board continuing to roll and a very stylish maneuver. If the rider is going downhill fast enough, it is possible to do powerslide rotations. It can also be done leaning forward but must be rotated the opposite way, which makes it similar to a bert slide but without placing the hand on the ground.

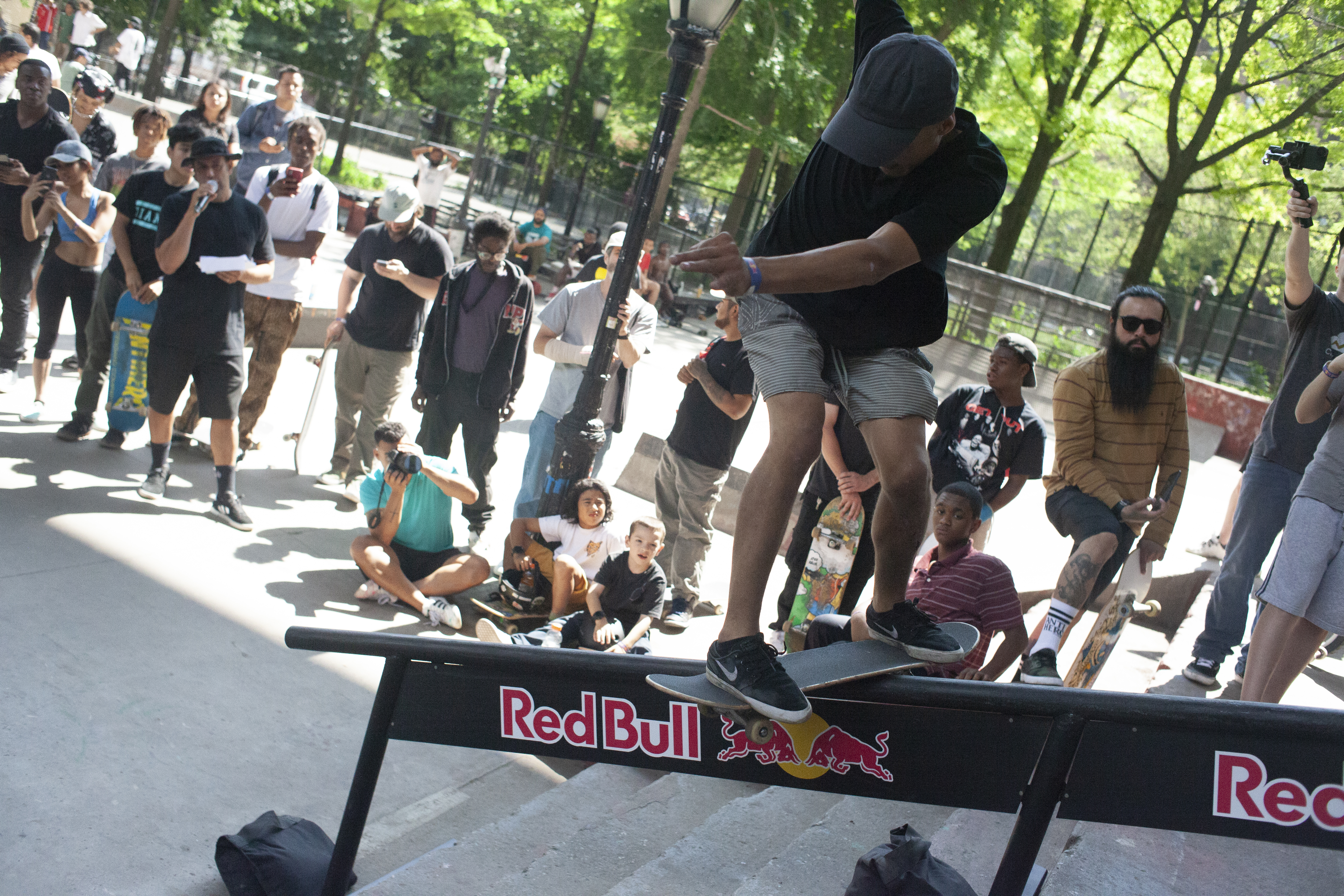
Starlin Polanco hits a backside lipslide down the rail at LES skatepark

Primoslide
The primoslide is a trick in which the rider flips the board and lands on it wheels and the side of the deck. It's mostly done on big boxes or on flat.

Push up
Putting both hands on the ground, leaning on the toeside edge, and spinning clockwise on the ground.

Stink bug
Leaning back on the board, putting one hand behind you on the ground while gripping the board between your legs. This is considered "bad form" in the downhill community.

Surrender Slide
Another downhill slide requiring slide gloves, a surrender slide is when a rider places both hands on the street in front of their board and lowers their upper body close to the pavement, extending their legs behind them and gripping the board with the sides of their feet. While not a particularly difficult or impressive slide, it is useful for linking together various other downhill slides. The wheels do not necessarily slide in a surrender because the deck remains pointing downhill, although it is possible to drift in this position.

Tailslide
Similar to the noseslide only when turning 90 degrees the tail of the board is landed on the edge of the ledge/rail.
