= Feeble =

Feeble may refer to:

- Feeble-minded
- Feeble, one of the imaginary anthropomorphic characters of the 1989 film Meet the Feebles
- Feeble, Travis Barker's first punk band
- Feeble grind, a type of skateboarding trick
