= Casper slide =

Casper slide may refer to:

- Casper (skateboarding), a skateboarding trick
- "Cha Cha Slide", a 2000 song from Mr. C the Slide Man
