= Skatestopper =

Skate-deterrent device

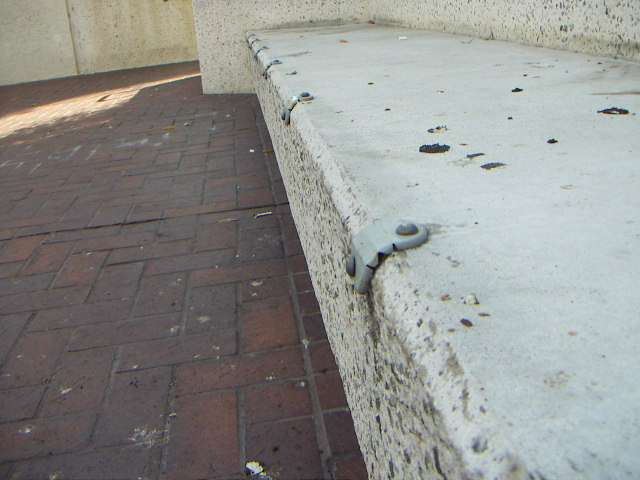
Curb with skatestoppers installed

Skatestoppers are skate-deterrent or anti-skate devices placed on urban terrain features, such as benches and handrails, to discourage skateboarders from grinding on the surfaces where they have been installed. They are a form of hostile architecture.

The name Skatestopper is a registered trademark of Intellicept of El Cajon, California, but in some skateboarding circles it has become a genericized term referring to any anti-skate device.

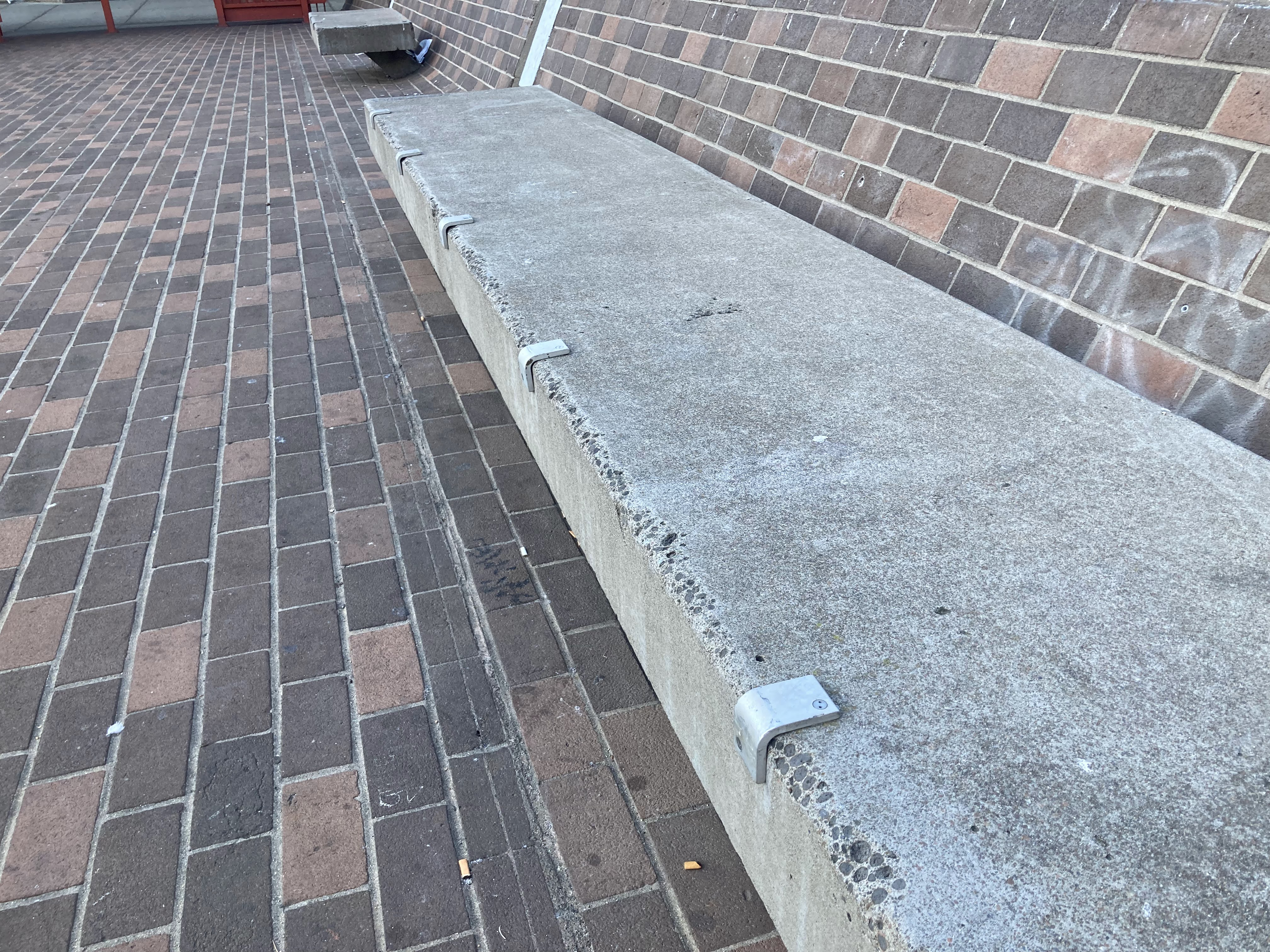
Skatestoppers on the large bench at the China Banks skate spot in Chinatown, San Francisco

== Design ==
The most basic skatestopper design is an L-shaped bracket affixed at intervals along a grind-able structure. Early designs were made from nylon while more recent designs have been made from aluminum. More ornamental versions have also been produced. Because the devices have been targeted for removal by skateboarders, there have been attempts to make skatestoppers tamper-resistant.

== Criticism ==
Some view skatestoppers as an obstacle to be overcome. The presence of skatestoppers can actually encourage skateboarders to stay in a location longer.
