= Larry Bertlemann =

American surfer (1955-2026)

Larry Bertlemann (August 7, 1955 – October 10, 2026), also known as Rubberman, was an American surfer.

== Early life ==
Bertlemann was born in Hilo, Hawaii, on August 7, 1955. When he was 11, he moved with his mother to Oahu, where he witnessed surfing at Waikīkī’s Queens break. Bertlemann first surfed on rented longboards.

== Career ==
At the age of 17, Bertlemann finished fourth at the 1972 World Surfing Championships and third at the 1972 Pipe Masters.

In 1974, he finished first at the Duke Kahanamoku Invitational at Sunset Beach.

In 1978, Bertlemann finished first at the Katin Pro-Am Team Challenge at Sunset Beach, Hawaii.

Martin Potter referred to Bertlemann as the "godfather of high-performance surfing". Kelly Slater referred to him as the "first New Schooler."

=== Bertlemann slide ===
A bertslide, Bertlemann slide, or bert, is a skateboarding trick where the skateboarder puts one hand on the ground and rotates the board while it is still on the ground, effectively sliding on the wheels of the skateboard. The trick was named after Bertlemann, who first performed the trick on a surfboard, then later incorporated it into his skateboarding. The original version of the trick was a 180-degree turn.

== Death ==
Bertlemann died in Honolulu on October 10, 2026, at the age of 71, following complications from a heart attack.
