= Todd Bratrud =

American artist

- Born: November 10, 1975 (age 50); Crookston, Minnesota, U.S.
- Other names: Da Bratt, T. Diggz, Mortimer IchaTODD Marker, T.H.L.A.T, Devon Green
- Occupation: Artist

Todd Bratrud is an illustrator and artist born in 1975 in Crookston, Minnesota, on the same day as the wreck of the S.S. Edmund Fitzgerald. He is the owner of Send Help skateboards, previously known as The High Five skateboards. He is currently living in Grand Forks, North Dakota. He lived in Minneapolis, Minnesota until he moved to Santa Cruz, California in 1999 to become the art director of Consolidated Skateboards. He has created hundreds of graphics for skateboards, stickers, advertisements and apparel for companies like Consolidated Skateboards, Flip Skateboards, Birdhouse Skateboards, Enjoi Skateboards, Black Label Skateboards, Creature Skateboards, Real Skateboards and Volcom. He is also an illustrator and blogger for The Skateboard Mag. Examples of his skateboard graphics can be found in the book Disposable, published by Ginkgo Press.

In 2006, Nike Skateboarding released the "Send Help" version of the Nike Dunk shoe with artwork designed by Bratrud.

In spring 2008, Todd was a featured artist for Volcom. Volcom released a series of T-shirts, sweatshirts, socks, bikinis, hats, and iPod cases based on the 'Lizard Print' motif designed by Bratrud. Volcom also sponsored a series of international art openings to showcase this product line and promote a series of limited edition screenprints.

In Fall 2008, Nike Skateboarding released another version of the Nike Dunk shoe designed by Bratrud.

In Spring 2009, Todd designed the cover of Clout magazine as well as a limited edition T-shirt featuring the same illustration.

In Spring 2009 he designed a board for MayDay distribution's Artist series called Tetris Effect.

In Fall 2009, Todd designed two more sneakers for Nike Skateboarding, the "Bratfink" (also known as the "Asparagus Dunk") and the "Brain Wreck."

In Fall 2009, Todd also designed a series of shirts for Brooklyn's KCDC skate shop. It is rumored that Bratrud is the creator of the highly coveted and iconic Belle and Sebastian/Bad Brains mashup T-shirt, also sold at KCDC.

On April 20, 2010, Nike released the "Skunk Dunk, " designed by Bratrud.

On Dec. 9, 2010, Todd was voted the top skateboard artist "right now" by Complex magazine.

On April 20, 2011, Nike released the "Cheech and Chong" Dunk, designed by Bratrud.

In August 2011, Todd Bratrud designed the graphics for the XGames Converse Coastal Carnage contest and also built a trophy replica of the art.

In September 2011, Nike released "The Cigar" Dunk, designed by Bratrud.

In November 2011, "The Art of Todd Bratrud", a graphic collection of Todd Bratrud's artwork was released by Mark Batty Publishers.

In October 2013, Nike released the "Send Help 2" Dunk, designed by Bratrud.

In October 2021, Nike released the "Strawberry Cough" Dunk designed by Todd Bratrud as a literal interpretation of a "Strawberry Cough", a strain of marijuana.
