= Grind (skateboarding) =

Skateboarding trick

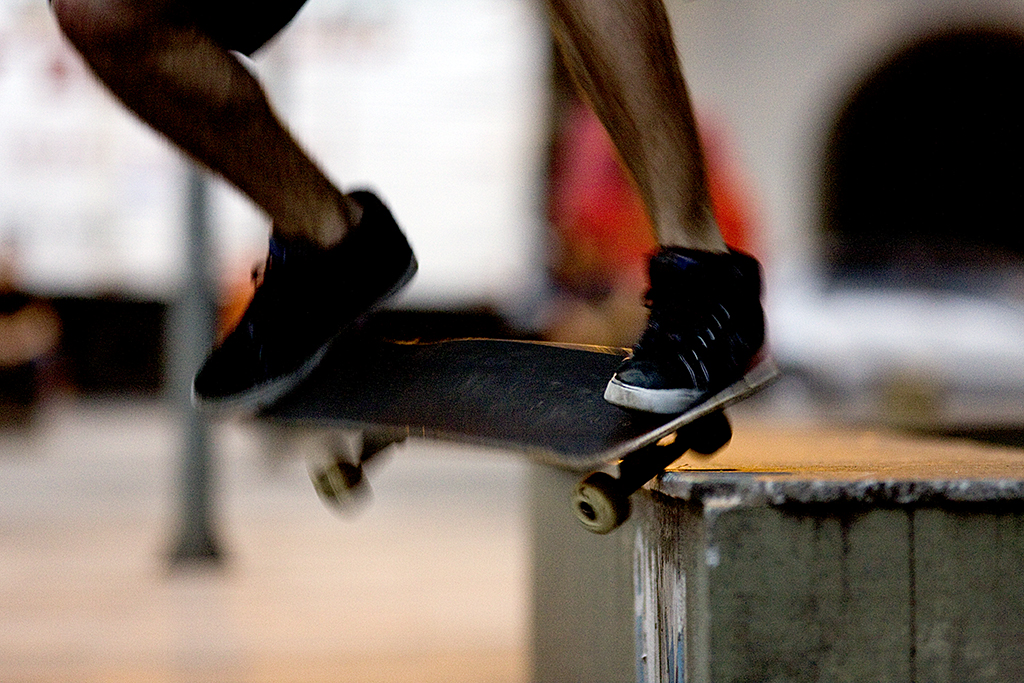
Crooked grind - the skateboarder grinds across the edge of the box on his front truck

In skateboarding, grinds are tricks that involve the skateboarder sliding along a surface, making contact with the trucks of the skateboard. Grinds can be performed on any object narrow enough to fit between wheels and are performed on curbs, rails, the coping of a skate ramp, funboxes, ledges, and a variety of other surfaces.

Grinds are typically categorized as either "frontside", where the rider approaches the feature with their front facing it, or "backside", where they approach with their back facing it.

== History ==
The move likely originated in backyard pools in the mid 1970s, as the early skaters gained in skill and confidence with their high speed carves around the top of the pool walls and one day unintentionally skated up to the edge of the pool, causing the trucks or board of the skateboard to slide (or grind) along the surface . The trucks of the time, often being merely 'borrowed' trucks from roller skates, didn't allow much contact due to their narrowness, but as skateboarding gained its own truck manufacturers who widened the hanger design, the possibilities for exploration became apparent, and all sorts of moves started popping up . There was a big leap in street skating starting in the 1990s. It has evolved ever since. Today, grinds are commonly performed on handrails, lips of benches, tables, hubbas (ledge on a slope), on a hard normal ledge, a flatbar, or anything that is possible to grind on.

=== Property damage ===
Grinding is damaging to materials which are not hardened for the specific purpose of the sport, as may be found in a skate park. The trucks are composed of a soft metal (aluminum or magnesium alloys) without lubricant or bearings on the grinding surface, so they literally do grind on the objects they slide across. Grinding can strip paint off of steel and wear down the edges of concrete, stone, aluminum, and wood building materials. Affected business owners and government buildings have put up anti-skate devices as a deterrent to grinding. Grinding in public places may be seen as a form of vandalism and may cause skateboarding to be banned by business owners and city ordinances.

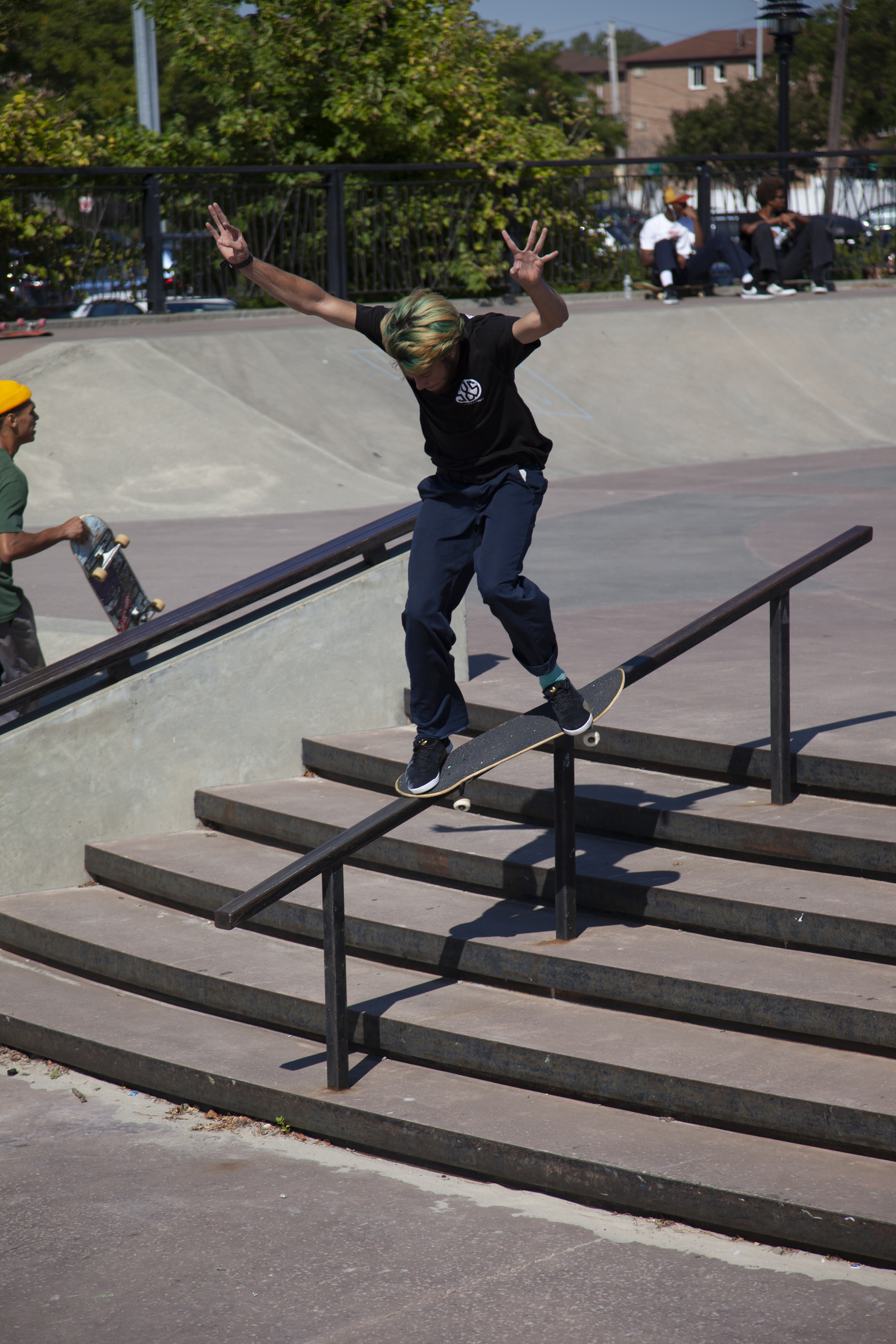
Kenny Gonzales - crooked grind - Far Rockaway Skatepark

front-side crook grind by Joël Chabot
