= Bertslide =

Skateboarding trick which was originally a surfboarding trick

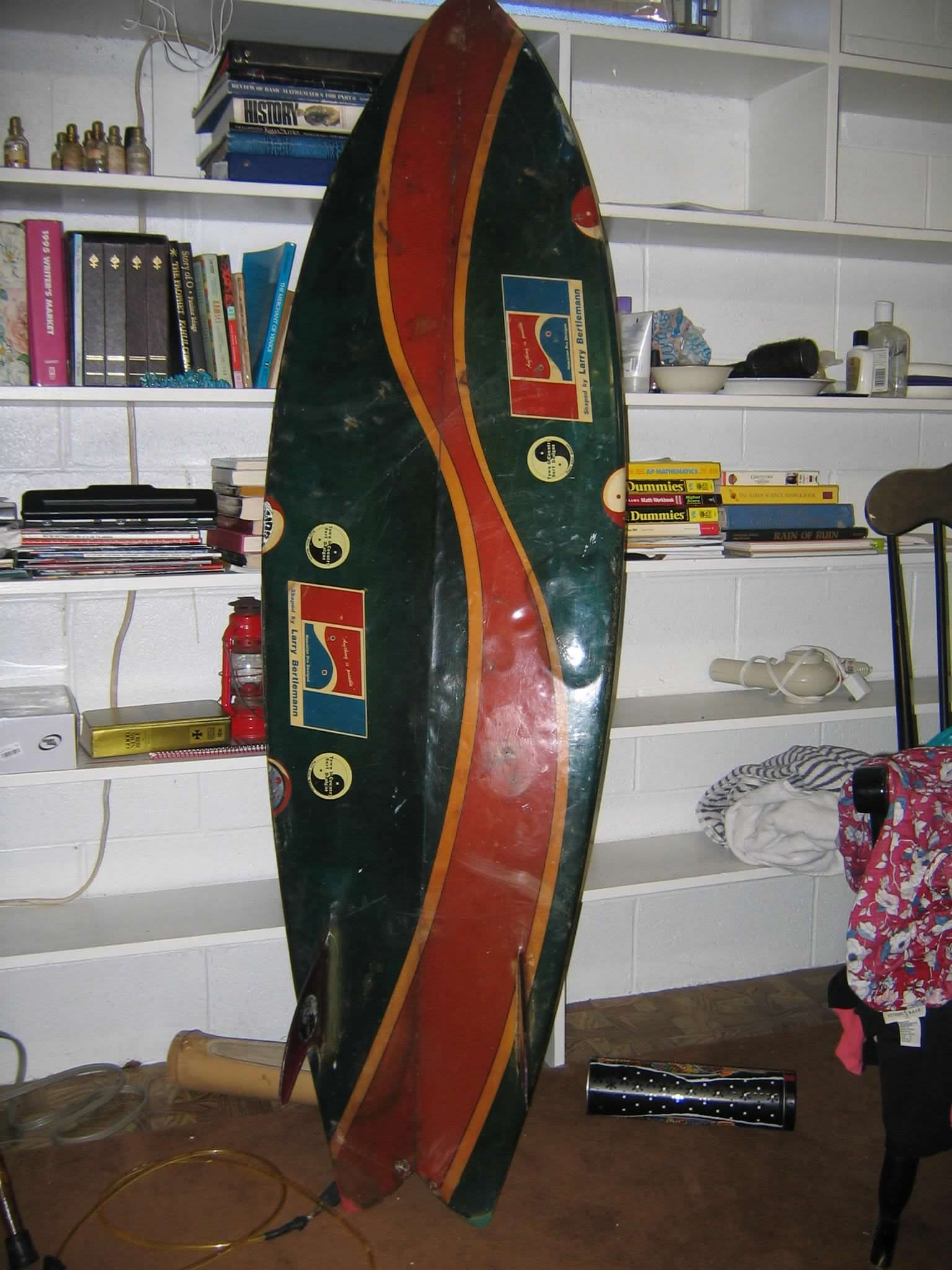
Board shaped by Larry Bertlemann who was a Hawaiian surfer and a skateboarder

A bertslide, Bertlemann slide, or bert, is a skateboarding trick where the skateboarder puts one hand on the ground and rotates the board while it is still on the ground, effectively sliding on the wheels of the skateboard. The trick was named after the surfer Larry Bertlemann, who first performed the trick on a surfboard, then later incorporated it into his skateboarding. The original version of the trick was a 180-degree turn. The Z-Boys, an influential group of mid-1970s skateboarders, adapted the move by extending the slide to 360 or even 540 degrees.

A bertslide can be performed on both flat ground or banks, and is considered fundamental for learning board control. Powell Peralta professional Lance Mountain introduced flatground bertslides into his routine at the first auditorium-size streetstyle contest, the 1987 Savannah Slamma, held in the Martin Luther King Arena in Savannah, Georgia.

When performing a bert, the skateboarder crouches down while doing a frontside carve, plants their front hand on the ground and extends their back foot and torso making the back wheels slide out. After the slide, the skateboard has made a 180-degree sweeping turn and the skateboarder pushes back up and continues in the starting direction. When performed in a transition, it is possible to convert a Bertlemann slide into a grind by timing the slide so that during the apex of the sweep the back truck hits the coping.
