= Casper (skateboarding) =

Freestyle skateboarding trick

Casper is a freestyle skateboarding trick that was invented by Bobby "Casper" Boyden in the late 1970s. Boyden had very pale skin and he was nicknamed after the cartoon ghost. The modern casper was invented by Rodney Mullen in the late 1980s.

A Casper begins with a half flip, after which the rider catches the skateboard upside down — placing the back foot on the tail and the front foot beneath the front part of the board, touching the grip tape and keeping it from touching the ground.

Casper was originally performed without jumping but it can also be performed from a half flip. When doing an original casper the skateboarder stands on the board so that the heel of his back foot is on the tail and the ball and toes are hanging from the side. The front foot rests on the opposite edge of the board near the trucks. The skateboarder then jumps up to unweight the board and presses the edge of the deck with his front foot to make the board flip over. When the board has flipped upside down the skateboarder catches it with his front foot and places his back foot on the now upside down tail. After balancing in this stance the skateboarder usually jumps up a bit, lifts his back foot from the board and uses his front foot to turn the board back to its normal position with a motion that resembles an impossible. The board is turned upside down with the tip of the tail on the ground acting as a fulcrum, the front foot under the front of the board holding it up acting as the effort, and the back foot resting on top of the back truck as the load. Note that the skateboarder's feet never touch the ground during this trick.

A modern casper is performed like a kickflip, but the skateboarder catches the board after it has flipped upside down and lands in the casper stance. A casper can be performed either when standing still or when moving. The balancing can also involve sliding on the tip of the tail. Exiting the trick can involve rotating, flipping or wrapping the board around the foot. It is recommended that beginners learning to incorporate the Casper initiate the move while riding fakie; riding tail-first allows the use of momentum to assist in lifting the nose of the board.

The reverse of this trick is the Anti-casper which is the same principle only applied a half-impossible into a casper on the nose of the board.

A comprehensive demonstration of the Casper, including complex variations on the theme and tricks involving the Casper can be seen in the Rodney Mullen segment of the 1994 film Second Hand Smoke, by Plan B.

There are many types of "casper tricks", such as the casper slide (A trick in which a rider does a half-kickflip so that they are in casper stance, then sliding/dragging the tail of the board on the ground so that the rider essentially slides), and the casper/hospital flip (where the rider does a half-kickflip, then uses their feet to spin the board in a 180 while the board also flips back to normal position). There is much debate whether the casper and hospital flip are the same. However, the casper flip uses both feet to spin the board, while the hospital flip only uses one foot, similar to a shuvit.
