= Lewis Marnell =

Professional skateboarder

Lewis Kristian Marnell
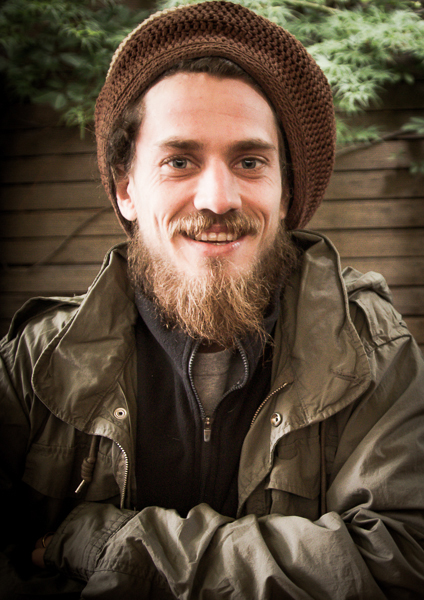
- Born: Lewis Kristian Marnell; 3 December 1982; Melbourne, Australia
- Died: 18 January 2013 (aged 30); Melbourne
- Other name: Jah Lew
- Occupation: Professional skateboarder
- Spouse: Nami

Lewis Kristian Marnell (3 December 1982 – 18 January 2013) was a professional skateboarder from Melbourne, Australia who was Slam Magazine's 2008 "Skater of the Year". Marnell died in January 2013, following complications related to type 1 (juvenile) diabetes, a condition that was diagnosed when he was 10 years old. Numerous tributes were published following Marnell's death and his longtime skateboard deck sponsor, Almost Skateboards, continues to use the hashtag "#LewisMarnellForever"—on 15 and 29 July 2014, the company published the hashtag with 2006 video footage of Marnell skateboarding in Japan.

== Early life ==
Marnell was born in 1982 in Melbourne, Australia and grew up in both Australia and Sweden. His parents were Janet and Jan, his brothers were Andrew and Jonas, and his sisters were Jessica and Ebba Louise. Marnell's older brother Jonas was an early skateboarding influence.

Marnell dropped out of high school in Sweden and moved back to Australia to pursue a career in professional skateboarding. In 2008 Marnell provided his perspective on leaving school: "I actually do wish that I just did it, straight up and got it out of the way. I ended up just dropping out. I went to a bunch of schools and was always behind. It became really repetitive, go to year 10, drop out, start year 10 again, drop out." Marnell continued to travel between Australia and Sweden before finally settling in Australia in 2002. Dustin Dollin, Marnell's friend at the time and now a popular professional skateboarder (his primary sponsors are Baker, Vans and Volcom), provided Marnell with skateboard decks from the Baker company during his early years skateboarding in Melbourne.

Marnell also spoke about his time living in Sweden with his father, who was a television and film producer at the time, a role that Jan Marnell continues to fulfill:

Sweden, I moved to Sweden in '96. My dad is Swedish, he moved over there from Australia, lived there for 6 months and after 6 months he asked me if I wanted to come out there and live there for a bit. It was only supposed to be a year but it ended up being 7. I ended up staying there for a while, did some school, did some skating, and tried the Swedish food. It was good.

Marnell also discussed the Swedish climate in relation to Australia:

Sweden has long winters, but their short summers are amazing. Australia is easy living, but so far away from everything ... It's pretty hard for anyone to deal with long cold winters, but being a skateboarder and dealing with it is way harder. I used to play a lot of video games and skate the local indoor park. But you get bored of skating the same old park every day for like nine months. I tried snowboarding a couple of time; it was pretty fun. My homie's dad owned a house in the hills and I would get to go kick it there sometimes and snowboard.

== Professional skateboarding ==
Marnell was initially sponsored by Menace Skateboards and Axion Footwear, before signing with Nike SB, Volcom and Almost. Prior to his promotion into the professional ranks of global skateboarding with the Almost company, Marnell was featured on the inaugural cover of the publication Pop Magazine.

Marnell was featured in the Volcom videos Chichagof, a part that he shared with Dollin, and Let's Live. Marnell was also a resident at a Volcom-owned house that was located in Newport Beach, California. Australian skateboard photographer Andrew Mapstone wrote a series, entitled "Now and Then", for the Volcom website, in which he recounted: "Joe [Pease], Lewis, Shane [Cross] and I spent months away from home in California's Newport Beach living at the Volcom Surf House on the sand. We had the most amazing time and we really lived life to the fullest." In 2004 Cross, who died in 2007, and Marnell filmed together in Melbourne at the time that the Globe World Cup was held.

Marnell was one of the first skateboarders to be sponsored by the Nike SB brand and, in 2007, he was the only 'official' Australian skateboarder on the international team. Marnell explained that he was recruited to the team when "they kinda rang me out of the blue one day when I was in Melbourne in 2004, asking me if I liked the shoes to skate in and it all just blew up from there." Marnell remained with Nike SB for the entirety of his time as a sponsored skateboarder and explained his experience with the brand in an interview:

You get treated like a professional athlete with Nike. And that's a good thing. Its weird cos I'm just a skateboarder….but I guess we are athletes in one way or another. The fact also that they are a massive company allows them to give us a lot more support than most others. Things are always sorted and there are very little hiccups when we're on the road or at events.

Marnell was featured in a promotional Internet clip for the re-engineered Nike SB 'Dunk' shoe, a model that he favoured and frequently wore in skateboard video footage. A print advertisement for the re-engineered model was also released and featured Marnell performing a trick at the Melbourne Museum, a famous international skateboarding location that had been used by professional skateboarder Daewon Song in his Skate More video part. In 2008 Marnell appeared with fellow Australian professional skateboarder Alex Campbell in a promotional video for the Australian Nike SB team that was filmed by Middlebrook. Marnell appeared in the Nike SB videos Nothing But The Truth, Don't Fear the Sweeper and SB Chronicles Vol. 1.

Marnell's inaugural video part for the Almost company was in the Song/Chris Haslam miniramp video project Cheese and Crackers—Marnell was introduced as a new team member through the inclusion of his part in the "Bonus" section of the DVD release and Curtis Mayfield's "Move on Up" is the soundtrack to the part. Marnell achieved professional status for the company in January 2008 and Song (co-founder and co-owner of Almost) and longtime videographer Socrates Leal filmed a spoof video part to welcome Marnell. The video, entitled "Almost Filmer Asshole", is shot through the lens of a "poacher" (someone who is attempting to film footage of another skateboarder—usually a professional skateboarder—when that person has not been given permission to do so) who throws Marnell's first professional Almost skateboard deck into the view of the camera, upon being caught by Song and Leal; the video was published on the Almost website and YouTube. Marnell's first board graphic featured a lion waving a Rastafarian flag.

Marnell appeared in numerous promotional features for Almost, both in video and print form. In August 2010, he was interviewed in relation to an Almost advertisement that appeared on the back cover of Transworld Skateboarding magazine, in which Marnell executes a switch frontside flip at the Melbourne Museum location. Marnell explained that the trick happened during an informal skateboarding session, at which filmers or photographers were not present, and revealed that the trick was filmed by Japanese and Australian friends. Marnell's closing trick from his part in the first instalment of Nike SB's Chronicles series was also used for a Transworld back cover (another Almost advertisement) in 2011—Marnell executes a trick known as a "nollie 360 flip" over a model of picnic table that is typically used in the US.

A cameo appearance from Marnell is featured in Song's 2011 solo part New Year's Dae that was released through the Berrics website, and a full video part from Marnell is featured in the 2012 Almost video 5 Incher.

Marnell was sponsored by the Deluxe Distribution company that is based in San Francisco, and rode for Deluxe's Thunder skateboard truck and Spitfire wheel brands.

Marnell was the first sponsored skateboarder for an Australian skateboard ointment product "The Cream" that was started in late 2012 by Duncan Ewington and Kris Whiting. Marnell produced a promotional video for the product in which he predominantly skateboards in Sweden.

=== Sponsors ===
At the time of his death in January 2013, Marnell was sponsored by Almost, Thunder, Spitfire, Nike SB, Modus and The Cream.

== Post-death ==
=== Lewis Marnell family memorial fund ===
In late April 2013, a public announcement revealed the problematic financial situation that remains following the death of Marnell. The news emerged together with a fundraising initiative for the "Lewis Marnell family memorial fund" that involved the musician Ben Harper, who reunited with The Innocent Criminals—a band that Harper recorded and performed with for numerous years—for a special re-recording of the song "Jah Work" from the 1997 album A Will To Live.

The organisers of the initiative explained that all of the proceeds from the iTunes sales of the song would be donated to a fund that will financially assist Marnell's family. A YouTube music video was also released at the same time and Harper is featured playing a guitar that was owned by Lewis Marnell—as another fundraising initiative, the guitar was auctioned in May 2013. As part of the announcement, Harper stated: "Lewis was a brilliant artist and athlete not to mention a truly beautiful soul. We loved him and his contributions to skating, and we thought a song would be a wonderful way to celebrate his life and help his family".

Additionally, Almost released a skateboard deck onto the retail market specifically for the memorial fund in mid-2013. The deck design features a photograph of Lewis Marnell riding a bicycle with two skateboard decks strapped across his back—"Never Forgotten" is written above the image and "Lewis Marnell 1982–2013" is written below. On 4 June 2013, skateboard photographer Seu Trinh (TransWorld Skateboarding magazine) appeared in an Instagram post holding the skateboard deck.

=== JDRF fundraiser ===
A January 2015 tribute to Marnell, organised by the Berrics, Nike SB and Almost, was used as a fundraiser for JDRF (formerly known as the Juvenile Diabetes Research Foundation). The event was held at the Berrics skateboarding facility in California, and was attended by Marnell's family, fellow skateboarders and his Almost teammates. In addition to a silent auction, a limited-edition "Lewis Marnell memorial" skateboard deck, signed by Song, Haslam, Mullen and Youness Amrani, was produced to raise funds for the event, with only 100 made available—the artwork on the deck was designed by Marnell's brother, Jonas Marnell.

== Awards ==
Marnell received the 2008 "Skater of the Year" award from Australian skateboarding magazine SLAM. The magazine's readers also successfully voted for Marnell's 5-Incher part for the 2013 'SLAM Video Part of the Year' award.

== Influence ==
=== Personal life ===
In a 2011 video interview, Marnell identified Guy Mariano as his favourite skateboarder.

=== Others ===
Luke Croker, a skateboarder who is sponsored by Krooked—a skateboard brand founded/owned by skateboarding pioneer Mark Gonzales—was a long-time friend of Marnell and explained: "He didn't half-arse anything. Everyone's vibe was better around him." Staff photographer at Transworld Skateboarding magazine Oliver Barton dedicated his weekly column "Oliver Barton's Top 5 YouTubes of the Week" to Marnell, stating that "It still seems too surreal to believe that he is not with us any more." Barton featured the Manolo compilation, Marnell-related Dollin footage, Marnell's Australian skateboarding peer Chima Ferguson and a tribute to Cross, who also died in Melbourne.

Following his death, a designed portrait of Marnell appeared on the cover of edition No. 193 of SLAM magazine (released on 10 April 2013), together with a corresponding feature article. The portrait was produced by New Zealand-born self-taught artist Gimiks Born and Marnell is described as a "legend" by the publication. A photograph of Marnell was then used for the cover of the 27th edition of The Skateboarder's Journal publication—the edition also featured a tribute article on the skateboarder's career and legacy.

In an April 2013 interview, Nike SB team-mate Paul Rodriguez explained that Marnell's death was unexpected and that it was especially sad to lose someone "so young and vibrant". Rodriguez revealed that he experienced "some good times" with Marnell, who he believed was "a great guy". A "R.I.P." article in memory of Marnell is the closing piece of the Skateboarder magazine's April/May 2013 issue and consists solely of a reflection from professional skateboarder/Dwindle Distribution team manager James Craig. In regard to Marnell's skateboarding, Craig explained: "His presence is undeniable and his skateboarding is a thing of beauty with pop unlike most. His way of floating tricks and the style with which he skated made him so amazing to watch and witness."

Professional skateboarder Shane O'neill, who is also from Melbourne and sponsored by Nike, nominated Marnell's part from the Nike SB Chronicles Vol. 1 skate video as his favourite. In November 2013, he introduced the part, edited without the musical accompaniment, for the "SB Chronicles Unplugged" series of online videos.

Professional skateboarder Morgan Campbell includes a tribute to Marnell in a 2014 music video for Scottish band Whilst. Campbell filmed the video while skateboarding from the Melbourne, Australia suburb of Brunswick to the central business district of Melbourne, and shot footage of an aerosol-paint mural that depicts Marnell's face during the trip.

== Personal life ==
=== Family ===
As of February 2013, Jan Marnell is involved in three ventures in the television/film industry: the HAMILTON trilogy at Pampas Produktion AB, Creative Director of Content Group Africa (CGA), and a freelance producer and consultant under the title "Long Rock". Jan Marnell is a Swedish citizen who also holds an Australian Permanent Residency Visa and studied at Melbourne, Australia's Swinburne University of Technology. According to his LinkedIn profile, Jan Marnell is "interested in any local or international project that's making a difference."

Jonas, Lewis' older brother, is an Australian artist and company owner. After emerging from the Sandringham High School scene (in the Melbourne suburb of Sandringham)—a scene that was also the origin of Melbourne aerosol artist "Sirum" (Andrew Bourke)—Jonas continues to own and operate a graphic design company ("Ethix Design"), as well as an art product distribution business ("Final Outline") in 2013.

=== Diabetes ===
In a 2008 interview with British online magazine Caught in the Crossfire, Marnell explained the relationship between alcohol use and his diabetes:

That's my no no. I had to cut the alcohol out of my diet. I'm diabetic y'see. One of my best mates Dustin Dollin called me one night and was like "Hey Lewis, you should come out, meet us for some drinks and we'll party". Met up with him in the city at this place called Pony Bar in Melbourne, little place where everybody knows each other. I went there hung out, not long at all. Maybe like 4 hours. I had maybe 6 beers, didn't really get drunk, went home and woke up in the morning. Went to have a sip of water and as soon as I swallowed it, I just started throwing up! Anytime I tried to eat or drink I would just throw up. I did that for 2 days and then went to the doctor who sent me to the emergency room. That's when I had to quit drinking because I nearly died.

Marnell explained in a 2010 interview with ESPN, "I really have to monitor my blood sugar levels a lot and make sure I always got some sweet stuff with me in case the levels drop too low." Marnell further stated that he could "live pretty free" but in terms of food, "a salad ain't gonna cut it; I need wholesome."

On 12 May 2013, Marnell's mother included a message on diabetes management in a Lewis Marnell tribute that was published on the well known historical skateboard website The Chrome Ball Incident: "Keep glucose in EVERY room in your house, even your bathroom. I don't want any other human being to be affected this way when, if you take these steps, it can be avoided. Diabetes is not a terrible disease, there are much worse. If you have it – manage it! This is the message Lewis would give you." Campbell also stated in his introduction to the Chrome Ball tribute, "Lewis still had a long life to live with his beloved wife Nami (who he only married late last year) and if his diabetes was managed a little better in those last months, he may still be here with us."

=== Marriage ===
Marnell met his longtime partner Nami in New York, US in 2005 and the latter's mother described the event as "two souls colliding". Marnell proceeded to study the Rastafari movement while he lived in New York with Nami. After receiving a student grant, Nami later relocated to Melbourne, Australia and the couple then lived in accordance with Rastafari principles.

Marnell married Nami in Melbourne, Australia in late 2012. Marnell published photos from the wedding on his Instagram profile and a selection of these pictures appeared on Marnell's Facebook fan page following his death in January 2013. Rodriguez spoke of Nami in an April 2013 interview: "... she came in and found him. I feel for her because it must have been the most crushing moment of her life [Marnell's death]."

=== Death ===
An official announcement on 20 January 2013 revealed that Marnell had died in the 48 hours prior to the announcement—details of the death were not provided. A statement from Marnell's mother Janet Marnell-Brown was then published by European skateboard magazine Sidewalk:

FYI and to clear up any quandries[sic] relating to Lewis' sad & untimely passing, he had a massive hypoglycemic reaction which did not respond to ingested glucose. He was at home and was discovered by his wife around 6.30 on Friday night Melb time. It was not possible to resuscitate him and we are all still trying to come to terms with this tragedy. We ask everybody to send out thoughts and prayers of love and comfort. Please keep his memory alive and let this not be a terrible waste.

Marnell had released Almost and Nike video parts in the 18 months prior to his death: 5-Incher and The SB Chronicles – Vol. 1, respectively. Eight months prior to his death, Marnell also appeared in the Transworld Skateboarding video The Cinematographer's Project as part of Middlebrook's Australian montage section, alongside skateboarders such as Jake Duncombe, Nick Boserio and Matt Mumford.

Song stated on his Instagram profile: "@lewismarnell you are a true inspiration brotha and will be missed thank u for showing the world your amazing gifts, and thank u for being such a positive,kind and giving friend to all! RIP". Song then published another photograph on 21 January 2013 with the following caption: "Shot this a while back!! reminded me of #lewismarnell 🙏 !! freedom is a gift and love and respect for each other makes for a better world !! #sorryboutpreaching".

Marnell's other teammates Cooper Wilt and Haslam also posted tributes on their respective Instagram profiles; Wilt wrote:

Today was rough one... Woke up to the news that Lewis Marnell had passed away. A great friend and teammate for the last 6 and a half years. Things just won't be the same without him — he's gone too soon but I'm glad to know that he made the most of his life! He travelled nonstop, met and married a great girl, and got to skateboard for a living — all with a huge smile on his face. Gonna miss him and remember him always, a true legend — Lewis Marnell!!

On 20 January 2013, Haslam posted a photo of Marnell seated on a purpose-built bicycle that Marnell had constructed, whereby a set of speakers is situated on a platform at the front of the bicycle. Luis Cruz, Almost's brand manager, posted the following tribute on the Almost Skateboards Instagram profile: "We are privileged to have had Lewis Marnell part of the Almost family. He will be loved and remembered for ever. RIP brother… you will be greatly missed."

Fellow Nike team riders Rodriguez and O'neill published tributes on the Internet. The Nike Skateboarding website featured a large photo of Marnell on its homepage and published the following tribute:

It is with great sadness and heavy hearts that we are to inform you of the passing of our longtime professional rider friend, Lewis Marnell. A skater whose incredible trademark pop could only be matched by the warmth of his smile, Lewis was an amazing person both on and off his board and will be truly missed. Our deepest condolences to his family and friends. Rest In Peace.

Marnell's death occurred during the production of the second volume of the SB Chronicles video series and he had not yet released a signature model shoe with the brand.

All four of the major skateboarding media outlets in the US—Transworld Skateboarding, The Skateboard Mag, Skateboarder and Thrasher—published specific tributes for Marnell.

The tribute from Thrasher magazine, published on 19 January 2013, stated:

As skateboarders we bond together as one true global family. When one of us passes, we all feel the pain. Anyone will tell you that Lewis Marnell was a great person, both on and off his board. We miss him way too much already, but we won't forget.

In 2012 Marnell filmed a "Firing Line" segment for Thrasher at the Melbourne Museum while wearing an Australian Aboriginal flag T-shirt.

The editor of Skateboarder magazine Jaime Owens published a photo tribute to Marnell on 23 January 2013 that was accompanied by a written passage—the final section read:

He made us listen to reggae constantly in the van while he was riding shotgun and I hate reggae but it was alright because Lewis ruled. He was a genuine and very humble guy that I felt immediately close to, like we had been friends for a long time. I still can't believe that Lewis is gone. My thoughts go out to all of friends, families and fans around the world. You will be missed brother. R.I.P. Lewis Marnell 1982–2013.

Owens initially posted a "rest in peace" message on the magazine's website on 19 January 2013: "Details are still coming in but our thoughts [sic] and prayers go out to Lewis' family and friends. We will miss you brother. R.I.P."

The Berrics website, co-owned by professional skateboarders Steve Berra and Eric Koston, was dedicated to Marnell on 21 January 2013, and the following words were published on its cover page: "We will see you in another life and it will be much more grand than this one. Until then, you will be missed our brother." Berra then introduced the day of dedication by writing, underneath a black-and-white silhouette photograph of Marnell:

He didn't come very often, but when he did, we were always in such awe how a guy so nice and so good skated to the beat of his own drum without feeling the pressure of having to skate to everyone else's. Usually, a guy with the kind of talent Lewis had would have a style and look that you've all seen before, the fact that he didn't is what made him even more special. In honour of him, we're taking today to post those times where he blessed the Berrics with his original style and one of a kind presence. He will be missed dearly by his friends, his family, and the entire world of skateboarding. – sb

Marnell filmed a "Trickipedia Tuesdays" segment for the Berrics, in which he performs a "nollie bigspin heelflip", a "Mini Bangin!" as well as an edition of "Text Yoself Beefo Yo Wreck Yoself" with professional skateboarder Darrell Stanton.

On 24 January 2013, skateboard videographer Fred Mortagne—responsible for Flip Skateboards' Sorry video and most of the videos of the Cliche skateboard company—published a video on his YouTube channel that featured Marnell and Dollin in Melbourne, Australia, as they filmed and skateboarded with a touring Cliche team in 2003. Mortagne wrote an accompanying blurb:

Then we came to Melbourne in 2003 with the Cliché team to film for Bon Appétit, and him and Dustin Dollin took really good care of us, bringing us to their super good spots. Lucas [Puig] and Lewis clicked together pretty good. There was a bunch of tricks Lucas wanted to do, but Dustin was always "no Lewis already did it on that spot!".

Two video compilations were also published on the Internet in memory of Marnell, one of which was produced by skateboard videographer Manolo—Manolo used reggae music, the favoured musical style of Marnell, for the compilation's soundtrack (Toots & The Maytals' "Pressure Drop" and Jimmy Radway & The Fe Me Time All Stars' "Wicked Have To Feel It").

Skateboarding Australia (SbA), the government-funded peak body for skateboarding in Australia, published a tribute on its website. Campbell, who is also SbA's online manager, wrote:

An extremely gifted, generous-souled human left us over the weekend. The skateboarding world bows its collective head in disbelief that Lewis Marnell has passed away. Lewis was a global citizen who had friends and navigated adventures on every portion of the planet. We will miss you Lewis. You will continue to inspire for generations to come. Wishing all the strength to his friends and family during this devastating time.

Numerous Facebook fan pages that feature artwork and written tributes were created for Marnell after his death, and a mural was painted at a skatepark in Australia. As of 25 January 2013, an additional two murals were completed in Melbourne as tributes to the late skateboarder—Jonas Marnell painted both murals in the suburb of Fitzroy; also, both murals were painted with aerosol paint on roller doors. The first mural is a reproduction of Marnell's first professional skateboard graphic with Almost, while the second mural depicts an image of Marnell's head in Rastafarian colours, with an encircled "RIP LEWIS" written underneath.

Skateboard videographer Jason Hernandez compiled a film tribute for the 15th Transworld Skateboarding Awards event that was held in Hollywood, California, US. The video is entitled One Love and Hernandez published a written accompaniment:

We lost a skateboarder, a friend, and most of all a truly good person. Lewis lived his life with Diabetes, the kind were you'd need to check your blood for its insulin levels and give your self a shot sometimes twice a day. Oh he'd let you know every day he had diabetes, he'd ask before every spot, "Oi – how far is the nearest store, Oi – I need to eat, Oi – how long are we gonna be here? I need food" I look back at this and smile, at the time I'd be like, "c-mon really…?" He was really good at misplacing his insulin pen, I helped him find it quite a few times, and remember how psyched he'd be to find it under his mess of shopping bags he'd bring on every session, OHHHH the shopping bags – they'd be rustling around making all sorts of noise in the car, hotel room; he'd have all his gummy worms, sour patch kids, all sorts of sugary foods to keep his levels were they needed to be. Lewis was legitimately a good person, he cared about what was going on in your life, he'd stop to talk with anyone, I mean anyone… A bum, the random lurker you don't want to talk to at the spot, anyone… We'd always be waiting on him cause he met some new friend at the skate spot/or wherever we stopped the car. I miss you Lewis I hate to say I truly took you for granted and am sorry for every time I made you eat Subway cause I couldn't figure out your diet, I wish I could tell you all this in person… but I can't. So next time I will try and let the people I see daily know that I appreciate them, and stop to talk with them just a little longer. R.I.P Lewis. Love you bud.

In his Skateboarder magazine tribute from the April/May 2013 issue, Craig concluded by stating: "He was a great man, husband, son, brother, uncle, mentor, friend, and skateboarder. We are all better for having him in our lives and his spirit will be with us forever."

A reggae sound system was set up at the Noise Bar venue in the Melbourne suburb of Brunswick on the evening of 3 March 2013 to raise funds in support of diabetes research. The event was attended by friends and supporters of Marnell, and all of the proceeds from the evening were donated to the research arm of Diabetes Australia; Campbell from SbA wrote, "Needless to say that it was packed full of smiles, bass and good people. We love you Lewis. Always did, always will."

=== Funeral ===
The memorial event for Marnell was held at the St Kilda Town Hall in St Kilda, a bayside suburb of Melbourne, Australia that is also the location of Janet Marnell-Brown's home—the funeral was attended by more than 100 skateboarders and was held on 5 February 2013. The mobile sound system that was built by Marnell was ridden by a friend, while the skateboarders who were present lifted their skateboards as a form of tribute. Marnell is survived by his wife and family.

== Videography ==
- Volcom: Chichagof (2004)
- Digital: Divercity (2005)
- Streets: Melbourne (2005)
- Autopilot (2006)
- Almost: Cheese and Crackers (2006)
- Nike SB: Nothing But The Truth (2007)
- Volcom: Let's Live (2007)
- Nike SB: Don't Fear The Sweeper (2010)
- Nike SB: The SB Chronicles Vol. 01 (2011)
- Almost: 5-incher (2012)
