= Shane Cross =

Australian skateboarder

Personal information
- Born: Shane Kenneth Cross; 22 August 1986 Gold Coast, Queensland, Australia
- Died: 7 March 2007 (aged 20) Melbourne, Victoria, Australia

Sport
- Country: Australia
- Sport: Skateboarding

Shane Cross (22 August 1986 – 7 March 2007) was an Australian street skateboarder from the Gold Coast, Queensland, Australia. Cross gained global prominence within the skateboarding community during the mid-2000s, before his death in a motorcycle crash when he was 20.

== Skateboarding career ==
=== Media coverage ===
Cross was featured in both Australian and international skate magazines and was interviewed by Thrasher Magazine in 2004. He was voted by his Australian peers as Slam Magazine's Skateboarder of the Year in 2005 and featured on the covers of Transworld Skateboarding (February 2005), Slap Magazine (April 2007) and Thrasher Magazine (June 2007).

=== Notability ===
Cross gained attention for numerous achievements in the realm of skateboarding, such as his successful execution of a frontside nosegrind at the iconic spot called "El Toro" following his first attempt, his drop in on a vertical wall during a tour of Australia (featured in a montage from the Time to Shine video) and his 360 flip at a location known as the "Lincoln 13".

=== Sponsors ===
Cross featured in several prominent skateboarding videos and his sponsors included Legacy Skateboards (discontinued – founded by former Australian Globe teammate, Matt Mumford), Flip Skateboards, Volcom, Globe, Thunder, 4128 and Ricta.

== Death ==
On 7 March 2007, Cross was killed in a motorcycle crash in Melbourne, Australia – he was a passenger on a motorcycle ridden by Swedish professional skateboarder, Ali Boulala, who was seriously injured in the crash. Prior to the crash, both riders were affected by alcohol, and neither wore helmets as a safety precaution before embarking on the ride. The Daily Telegraph newspaper, published in Sydney, Australia, disclosed in a post-accident article:

Boulala had a blood alcohol concentration of .162 and Cross, who died in hospital, had a blood alcohol level of .18. Neither of the men were wearing helmets.

Boulala and Cross had earlier been at city nightspot the Cherry Bar. They then went to a friends house and drank beer. County Court Judge Sue Pullen said Boulala slammed into the hotel wall at an estimated 30 km/h about 1.05am after doing two to three laps around the block.

Following a four-month coma, Boulala was subsequently charged, found guilty of culpable driving and sentenced to a four-year prison sentence. Huck magazine published an interview that one of its journalists had conducted with Boulala following his release. In the several months following Cross' death, senior Flip team rider, Arto Saari, quit from the Flip company, despite having been with the company for the entirety of his professional career, due to the distress that was caused by Cross' death.

In episode 2 of the Globe United By Fate video series, Cross can be seen performing a trick (a "360-flip" down a gap) in the Docklands area of Melbourne, Australia, while Boulala and other professional skateboarders/friends, Jake Duncombe and Lewis Marnell, are also present. The wall that Boulala and Cross crashed into during their motorcycle ride has since been adorned with an aerosol paint mural.

== Legacy ==
The Australian and wider skateboarding community was devastated by Cross' death, with the deputy editor of Australia's Slam magazine, Trent Fahey, stating that "Shane would be the most naturally talented skateboarder ever to come out of Australia". Cross' funeral was attended by a large contingency of skateboarders from both Australia and the rest of the world (Saari has cited the attendance total, including family, as 250 people), while several memorial events were held to celebrate his life (at the 2008 Slam Skater of the Year Award ceremony, held in Surry Hills, Sydney, the following dedication was announced: "This award is for Shane Cross, in fact from now on every fucking award is for Shane Cross"—that year's award was won by Marnell); numerous tributes and memorial pages have been publicly released on the subsequent anniversaries of Cross' death and, in 2011, Flip uploaded a dedication to Cross on its website, stating, "We miss you buddy! Forever in our hearts. Ride on."

Cross is included in a list, 'Ten Infamous Australians', published in a 2011 edition of Transworld Skateboarding and is one of 'Seven Aussie Greats' on the Adrenalist web site (number 4).

In 2007 Duncombe, a close friend, designed a tribute skateboard deck for Cross. The deck was released by Blind, Duncombe's board sponsor at the time, and all proceeds from the product's sale were donated to the Cross family. Duncombe also attained a tattoo—drawn in Burleigh Heads, Queensland, Australia—on his forearm in remembrance of Cross. Duncombe used a photograph of Cross from the last skateboard tour that they were tour-mates on as the basis for the tattoo, and the image depicts Cross laughing while wearing a headband that holds back lengthy hair.

At the 2012 Thunderdome skateboarding contest, held at Hordern Pavilion in Sydney, Australia, Duncombe presented a skateboard griptape design that featured Cross's name (the "o" had been transformed into the Gerald Holtom-designed peace symbol and the griptape was produced in a variety of colours) and a group photograph was taken in which various competitors held up the griptape.

== Reflections ==
Marnell stated in a series of five-year anniversary interviews for Transworld Skateboarding magazine, in specific relation to the magazine's 2006 "TransAm" tour, "I mean, he was like, everyone's best friend. Because, in a way, everyone had some sort of tie with him. Everyone loved him and always good vibes; always a smile on his face." As part of the same series, sponsored skateboarder, Angel Ramirez, stated, "'Handshakes are for strangers; give me a hug'. He would always say that." Mark Whiteley, while an editor for SLAP magazine, revealed in a forum thread entitled, "Remembering Shane Cross 4 Years On":

I only got to meet Shane a few times, but had dinner with him and some of the Flip guys when they came to skate Stanford near my house, was just a few months before he passed. I remember him best from that night- he was just so friendly and happy, and everybody around him was the same way because of him. Good vibes, and such a talented skater. When we had our 15-year anniversary issue of the mag, we did a collage of sorts and decided that a photo of him would be the only action photo on the cover ... Unfortunately I don't think he ever got to see it as it came out almost exactly on the day he passed. But yeah, rest in peace, Shane. You're remembered well. Never forget!

The "GetRad Blog", an Internet-based Tumblr site, produced by Australian skateboard videographer/editor, Jackson Getrad Buhck, published the following passage in relation to Cross:

The last time I saw Shane before his death would probably have been about over a year before hand, and to this day the length of not seeing him once between his passing upsets me more than anything. I wish I could have seen him some how while I had the chance, I wish I could have hugged him while I had the chance, I wish I could have told him how much I loved him while I had the chance. I miss him so much, he was the best dude ever and it still makes me cry to this day that he is not with us.

What Shane's passing has taught me and that I want to pass on to as many people as I possibly can, is to show love to all your homies all the time. You dont relise [sic] how important someone is in your life until they are gone. Give your bro a hug, tell him how much he means to you, because one day you won't have the chance.

Hand shakes are for Strangers!

In a biographical series of Saari's professional skateboard career (part of Vice's Epicly Later'd program), Saari stated in relation to Cross's death:

We didn't really know how to deal with that. Things just got rowdy and people started lashing out on each other, and this and that – kind of blaming people and ... it didn't really hit me until months later. Like, I think it didn't-like we went to Shane's funeral, everyone was there, and it was like one of the most beautiful thing I have ever seen. Like, there's like 250 skateboarders around the world, and close friends and family, all together there, and ... why couldn't it have been just like, everyone there, just like Shane 'Skater of the Year' party, or something, you know? Why did it have to be a funeral?

The team manager of Flip at the time of Cross's death, Ewan Bowman, recalled time spent with Cross in San Francisco, United States (US):

I have a really horrible memory. Most times I can't remember something that happened more than 5 minutes in the past. However, on occasion I will get a flash back to a special moment that I will never forget. One particular trip with Shane Cross will always be with me. We were up in San Francisco, the crew consisted of Shane Cross, Joe Peaz, photographer Ryan Allen, David Gonzalez, and David's friend Mauricio. The vibe in S.F. is amazing and for Shane, who was already deeply in love with the whole hippy, acid, peace and love thing, he truly embraced the city as if it were in its 60's heyday ... Shane was in his zone on this particular trip from the get go. At each spot we went to he laid down the law all the while being so typically casual about it.

=== Shred for Shane ===
Since Cross's death, an annual event has been organised by the Australian skateboarding community, entitled 'Shred for Shane'. The event has been held at prominent skateboard locations such as the Fitzroy Bowl; the Globe headquarters' mini-ramp in Melbourne, Victoria; Waterloo Skatepark in Sydney, New South Wales and Pizzy Skatepark in Queensland, Australia, the state where Cross's friends and family live.

== Personal life ==
Cross stated in an interview that his favourite five bands were Metallica, Iron Maiden, AC/DC, Guns N' Roses and Liquid Nelson Theory. He further revealed that he had never read a whole book in his entire life, and his favourite films were Anchor Man, Old School and SpongeBob SquarePants. Cross's favourite places were Mexico, and the Australian locations of Nimbin and Melbourne, while "friends" were his inspiration.

== Videography ==
- Northern Lights (2004)
- Just Chill (unknown)
- Thrasher: King of the Road (2005)
- Flip: Feast Tours (2006)
- Ruthless (2007 independent video)
- Volcom: Let's Live Shane Cross (2007)
- Globe & Thrasher: Money for Blood (2007)
- Globe: United by Fate 1 (2007)
- Globe: United by Fate 2 (2007)
- Flip: Extremely Sorry (2009)
