= Nike Skateboarding =

Line of Nike products

Nike SB
- Product type: Skateboarding equipment
- Current owner: Nike
- Country: United States
- Introduced: 2002; 24 years ago
- Website: nike.com/skateboarding

Nike Skateboarding, primarily known as Nike SB, is the Nike brand for its line of shoes, clothing, and equipment for skateboarding. Nike Skateboarding won the 2020 Webby People's Voice Award for Best Home/Welcome Page in the category Web.

== History ==
In 1997, Nike commenced production of its own line of skate shoes, but was unable to sell to many specialist skate shops, as the market was already strongly in favour of companies such as DC, Globe, eS Footwear, Emerica, and Vans. Nike was not considered a core skateboarding brand among the skateboarding community and did not receive the necessary level of support.

In 2002, Nike introduced the "SB" brand. The Nike SB Dunk Low model was released, featuring a padded tongue and collar, along with "Zoom Air" insoles; the shoe was more similar to other skate shoe styles than the corporation's previous attempts. After the SB Dunk's mediocre sales, Nike released four other models: The Nike SB Angus, Nike SB FC, Nike SB Delta Force, and Nike SB URL.

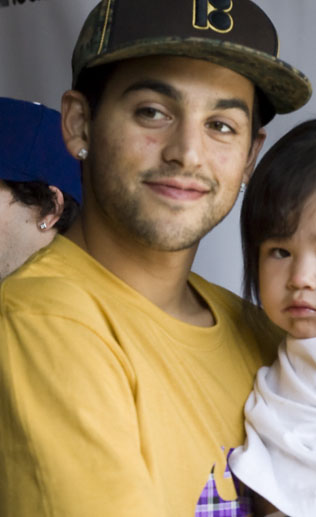
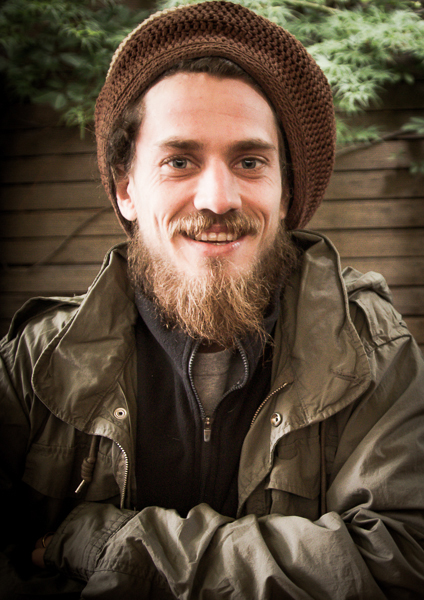
Paul Rodriguez (left) and Lewis Marnell were among the first skateboarders who signed deal sponsorships with Nike in 2004.

In 2004, Nike SB signed Paul Rodriguez as a figurehead for the brand and recruited Lewis Marnell as the sole Australian team rider during the same period. In March of that year, Nike released the Nike Dunk SB collection, aimed towards skateboarders in California. The associated shoe designs differed from the previous SB Dunk range in that they were designed specifically for skateboarders. The collection included increased padding, Zoom Air insoles, and enhanced material quality, including triple stitching, a standard for skate shoes.

In 2005, Rodriguez released a signature shoe model named the "Nike SB Paul Rodriguez Zoom Air Low". That year, one of Nike SB's spokespersons, Lance Mountain, decided to release the Nike Blazer SB, a version of the Nike Blazer basketball shoe from the early 1970s. It was named the Nike SB Blazer and several new features were added, such as the padded collar and Zoom Air insoles. Mountain previously rode for Adidas and then joined Nike SB in 2007.

Nike SB released its first video Nothing But The Truth in 2007 and held the premiere at in New York City, U.S. The inaugural video production, directed by Lionel Goldstein, features the Nike SB team, with Marnell in the opening part and Rodriguez's part the conclusion of the video.

In 2009, Eric Koston left Lakai Limited Footwear to join Nike and a video featuring the Nike SB amateur team, called Debacle, was released later in the year. In December 2011, the video SB Chronicles Vol. 1 premiered online, while premiere parties and free video showings were held throughout the world. The first volume of a two-part series features Stefan Janoski, Wieger Van Wageningen, Chet Childress, Daniel Shimizu, Youness Amrani, Marnell, Grant Taylor, and Clarke Hassler.

In 2012, professional Sean Malto (riding for Girl) left Etnies for Nike SB, shortly after his 2011 street league skateboarding win. Flip rider Luan Oliviera was also added to the team and, in late June 2012, Nike SB announced its collaboration with Levi's and team rider Omar Salazar appeared in the promotional advertisements.

In July 2012, Nike Skateboarding opened a private training facility in Downtown Los Angeles, California. Named "6th and Mill" due to its location at the intersection of the corresponding street names (E. Sixth and Mill Streets), the facility's official opening coincided with the launch of Rodriguez's sixth signature shoe with the brand. The training facility has featured heavily on The Berrics skateboarding website since its opening, with segments such as "First Try Fridays" (with professional skateboarder Theotis Beasley) and "Text Yo'self Before You Wreck Yo'self" (with professional skateboarder Chris Roberts) filmed inside the facility.

The brand released a preview of Brian Anderson's first signature shoe model, entitled the "Nike SB Project BA", in February 2013. The Sneaker Report website explained that the "upper appears to be a two-piece construction with ample perforations for breathability." As of mid-June 2013, the model has not yet been released.

A promotional campaign, identified by the hashtag "#thelegendgrows", was launched by Nike to coincide with release of Koston's second signature shoe model the "Eric Koston 2" in March 2013. An advertisement that included other Nike athletes, such as Tiger Woods, and Koston's Nike SB teammates was filmed and a behind-the-scenes video was also published on the brand's YouTube channel. Koston used the Eric Koston 2 design as a basis for a limited edition golf shoe, named the "Koston 2 IT", and a corresponding launch was held in London, UK at the 1948 Stadium store in Shoreditch.

The trailer for the video SB Chronicles Vol. 2 was published on the Internet in mid-June 2013. The second volume of the two-part series features Oliveira, Daryl Angel, Donovon Piscopo, Theotis Beasley, Justin Brock, Shane O'Neill, and Ishod Wair. Also in mid-June, Nike SB announced that Fucking Awesome Skateboards' Kevin Bradley and Skate Mental skateboards' Trevor Colden were the latest amateur additions to the team. In August 2013, Nike SB collaborated with Almost and TransWorld Skate Boarding magazine on a feature for amateur rider Youness Amrani. Entitled "Marrakesh Express", the project combined a print article with a video part that was launched on the TransWorld website on August 9, 2013. Videographer Chris Thiesson accompanied Amrani as he skated and traveled between "Casablanca and Marrakesh by way of Rabat, Kenitra, and Agadir" in Morocco. Amrani was born in Morocco, but grew up in Belgium.

In early 2014. Amrani was promoted to professional status with his skateboarding deck company Almost, and attained professional status on the Nike SB team afterwards.

In the late 2010s and early 2020s, the Nike SB dunk has had a booming resurgence. Nike SB has had many collaborations over the years on SB Dunk shoes. Some notable 2020 collaborations include StrangeLove, Travis Scott, Ben & Jerry's, Concepts, and Atlas. These collaborations led to the resurgence of the SB Dunk, in both the skateboarding and streetwear community.

Once the proper skateboarding division of Nike was created, it did not take too long for the fusion of Jordan Brand skateboarding to take place. Iterations of the Air Jordan like the “Phat” in the late 2000s beefed up the model and became popular with skaters, though an official Nike SB x Jordan release would not occur until 2014.

== Competitions ==
In 2012, following Koston's recruitment as a team rider, a competition entitled "Mr. Control It All" was launched to coincide with the release of Koston's inaugural signature shoe model with the brand. Koston hosted the competition, alongside fellow team members, Sean Malto and Justin Brock, and it consisted of numerous missions, or challenges. For example, in "Mission 1", a different trick was performed by all three skateboarders and entrants were required to send in their edited footage in which they perform the same set of tricks. The entire competition was conducted on the internet, on sites such as YouTube, The Berrics and Nike's own skateboarding site.

== Special editions ==
In addition to yearly releases, a variety of special edition Nike Dunk SBs have been released. The Nike Dunk SB Low Pro SB Tiffany was released in 2005 and, according to the Complex Sneakers website, was one of the brand's first designs to "drive nearly everyone crazy." The Nike Dunk SB Tiffany design was also adapted by Nick Tershay, as part of Diamond, his skateboard/streetwear company. Other variations and collaborative releases with popular clothing brands made Nike SB popularity intensify. Brands like Stüssy, Supreme New York, Staple Design, and Concepts all developed their own version of the Nike SB Dunk that became highly desired. The Nike Dunk SB Low Staple "NYC Pigeon" was also initially released in 2005 by Staple Design. The shoe made headlines of the New York Post because of a riot that started over the shoe and its release. On an interview with Jeff Staple owner of Staple Design, he stated "They were pulling kids off the gate and arresting them, and kids are holding onto the gate not letting go. Then it turned into a soccer match. Cops called higher level police, like SWAT, and some of the people who came to wait in line brought their own weapons. We saw machetes and baseball bats on the ground. It was crazy. It was just go to a store and buy shoes before that.” Nike SB made an impact on what is known today as sneaker culture, and in an article from Hypebeast, which says "the success of SB and my desire to have them to the cool color schemes which allowed us as a community to nickname each shoe and the coinciding box colors that signaled different eras" and with limited product and high demand it added more to the triumph of Nike SB at the time.

In 2020, Nike partnered with Ben & Jerry’s. The NIKE SB Dunk Low Chunky Dunky went on sale in May, and sold out almost immediately. The last collaboration with a consumer brand that did this well was a pair made with Heineken almost two decades ago.

In 2023 Nike SB arguably had their biggest year to date, featuring several limited collaborations Featuring Jarritos, Yuto Horigome, Crenshaw, Supreme, and Born X Raised which had a delayed release due to the passing of Chris "Spanto" Printup the Founder of Born X Raised. This collaboration was envisioned by Spanto to represent the streets of LA and sold out in minutes of its release, with many claiming it to be sneaker of the year in 2023.

== Team ==
=== Professional ===
- Cameo Wilson
- Sky Brown
- Raven Tershy
- Stefan Janoski
- Paul Rodriguez
- Shane O'Neill
- Carlos Ribeiro
- Karsten Kleppan
- Guy Mariano
- Nyjah Huston
- Dashawn Jordan
- Wieger Van Wageningen
- Grant Taylor
- Alex Olson
- Chet Childress
- Eric Koston
- Leticia Bufoni
- Rayssa Leal
- Brian Anderson
- Sean Malto
- Lance Mountain
- Omar Salazar
- Ishod Wair
- Justin Brock
- Theotis Beasley
- Jason Lee
- Ben Raybourn
- Youness Amrani
- Kevin Bradley
- Nick Boserio
- Blake Carpenter
- Bobby Worrest
- Donovon Piscopo
- John Fitzgerald
- Kevin Terpening
- Hjalte Halberg
- Oskar Rozenber
- Angel Shumi Angelov
- Leo Baker
- Mark Roberts
- Yuto Horigome
- Funa Nakayama
- Elijah Odom

=== Australian team ===
- Morgan Campbell
- Harry Clark
- Nick Boserio
- Nathan Jackson
- Max Couling
- Alex Campbell
- Andrew Currie
- Corbin Harris
- Jason Rainbird
- Josh Pall
- Max Schubert
- Haley Wilson
- Rowan Davis
- Mikey Mendoza
- Jack O'Grady
- Casey Foley

Footage of the Australian team skateboarding at the 2012 Thunderdome competition event, held at the Hordern Pavilion in Sydney, Australia, was uploaded to the website of Skateboarding Australia, the government-funded organisation that ran the event.

A Nike SB film of Australian riders Boserio and Alex Campbell was released on April 4, 2014. Entitled "Two Up," the video's trailer was uploaded to the brand's YouTube channel on March 24, 2014, and is produced and directed by Chris Middlebrook.

=== Death of Lewis Marnell ===
An official announcement on January 20, 2013, revealed that Lewis Marnell had died in the 48 hours prior to the announcement. Details of the death were not provided. Marnell had released a Nike video part in the 18 months prior to his death—Nike SB's The SB Chronicles – Vol. 1. Fellow Nike team riders Rodriguez and O'Neill published tributes on the Internet. Marnell's other Nike video parts are contained in Nothing But The Truth and Don't Fear The Sweeper.

The Nike Skateboarding website featured a large photo of Marnell on its homepage and published the following tribute:

It is with great sadness and heavy hearts that we are to inform you of the passing of our longtime professional rider friend, Lewis Marnell. A skater whose incredible trademark pop could only be matched by the warmth of his smile, Lewis was an amazing person both on and off his board and will be truly missed. Our deepest condolences to his family and friends. Rest In Peace.

Marnell's death occurred during the production of the second volume of the SB Chronicles video series and he had not yet released a signature model shoe with the brand.

== Videography ==
- Nike SB: On Tap (2004)
- Nike SB: Nothing But The Truth (2007)
- Nike SB: Debacle (2008)
- Nike SB: Don't Fear The Sweeper Tour Video (2009)
- Nike SB: The Bird Is The Word European Tour Video (2010)
- Nike SB: The SB Chronicles, Vol. 01 (2011)
- Nike SB: The SB Chronicles, Vol. 02 (2013)
- Nike SB: The SB Chronicles, Vol. 03 (2015)
- Nike SB: Trust Fall (2019)
- Nike SB: Constant (2021)
