= Colden =

Colden may refer to:

== People ==
- Alexander Colden, first recorded Postmaster of New York City
- Cadwallader Colden (1688–1776), physician, farmer, surveyor, botanist, and lieutenant governor of the province of New York
- Cadwallader D. Colden (1769–1834), Colonel in the U.S. Army during the War of 1812, member of New York State Assembly, mayor of New York City, U.S. Representative, and member of New York State Senate
- Cadwallader Colden Washburn (1818–1882), a founder of General Mills and a representative from Wisconsin to the United States Congress
- Charles J. Colden (1870–1938), a representative from California to the United States Congress
- Charles S. Colden (1885–1960), American lawyer and politician
- Jane Colden (1724–1766), U.S. botanist
- Trevor Colden (born 1994), U.S. skateboarder

== Places ==
=== England ===
- Colden, West Yorkshire, a village in Calderdale
- Colden Common, a village and civil parish in Hampshire

=== Isle of Man ===
- Colden, a peak on the Isle of Man

=== United States ===
- Colden, New York, a town in Erie County
- Mount Colden, Adirondack Mountains, New York
- Lake Colden a lake in the Adirondack High Peaks, New York
