= Carpet Company =

American streetwear and skateboard brand

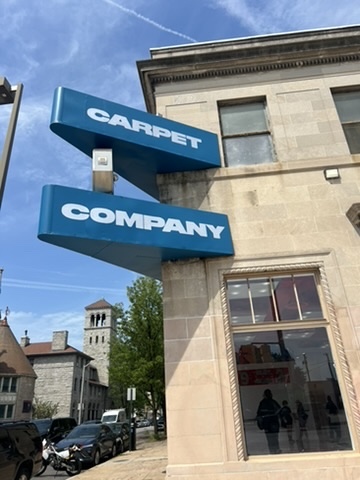
- Industry: Clothing manufacturing
- Genre: Streetwear
- Founded: 2016; 10 years ago in Baltimore, Maryland, U.S.
- Founders: Ayman Abdeldayem and Osama Abdeldayem
- Headquarters: Baltimore, Maryland, U.S.
- Area served: Worldwide
- Products: streetwear, skateboards, and novelty items
- Website: www.carpetco.us

Carpet Company is an American streetwear and skateboarding brand founded in Baltimore, Maryland, in 2016 by brothers Ayman and Osama Abdeldayem. Known for limited seasonal releases and a DIY aesthetic rooted in skate culture, the brand has collaborated with Nike SB, Vans, the Baltimore Orioles, and fellow Baltimore band Turnstile. In April 2026, Carpet Company opened a flagship retail storefront in Baltimore's Station North neighborhood, its first permanent retail location.

== History ==
Ayman and Osama Abdeldayem were born in Alabama and raised in Prince George's County, Maryland, the youngest of five sons in a first-generation Egyptian-American family. Their father, a physicist, placed a strong emphasis on academic achievement, and both brothers pursued engineering careers — Ayman working at NASA, Osama earning a mathematics degree — before founding Carpet Company. The brothers have described those careers as a detour from their true interests, and brought a hands-on technical sensibility to the brand.

Carpet Company was founded out of a friend's basement in the Baltimore area. Teaching themselves screen printing using a machine purchased secondhand, the brothers produced an initial run of ten T-shirts for fellow skaters before expanding into skateboard decks, which were picked up by local skate shops. Within a year, their designs had gained wider attention online. As devout Muslims, the brothers included prayer rugs in many of their early shop orders; a personal touch that reflected the brand's DIY ethos and connection to its community. The brand operates on a limited release model, issuing new products in discrete runs referred to as "seasons."

=== Sneaker Collaborations ===
In 2021, Carpet Company collaborated with Nike SB on a Dunk featuring a tear-away material that revealed a different colorway through use. In 2024, the brand had their first collaboration with Vans creating a Skate Half Cab and a Skate Cab 4. In 2025, the brand released their second collaboration with Vans in the form of the Vans Skate Old Skool 36+. In 2026, the brand released its first collaboration with Salomon on the XT-Whisper Void "Habibi Express".

=== Orioles Collaboration ===
In June 2024, Carpet Company released an official collaboration with Baltimore Orioles that included New Era Cap Company hats and T-shirts that sold out within the weekend.

=== Turnstile Collaboration ===
In July 2025, the brand launched a one-day pop-up shop with fellow Baltimoreans Turnstile (band). The release included a limited edition (500) picture disc vinyl record of the band's album Never Enough (Turnstile album). Turnstile bassist Franz Lyons appeared at the 68th Grammy Awards wearing Carpet Company.

== Flagship Store ==
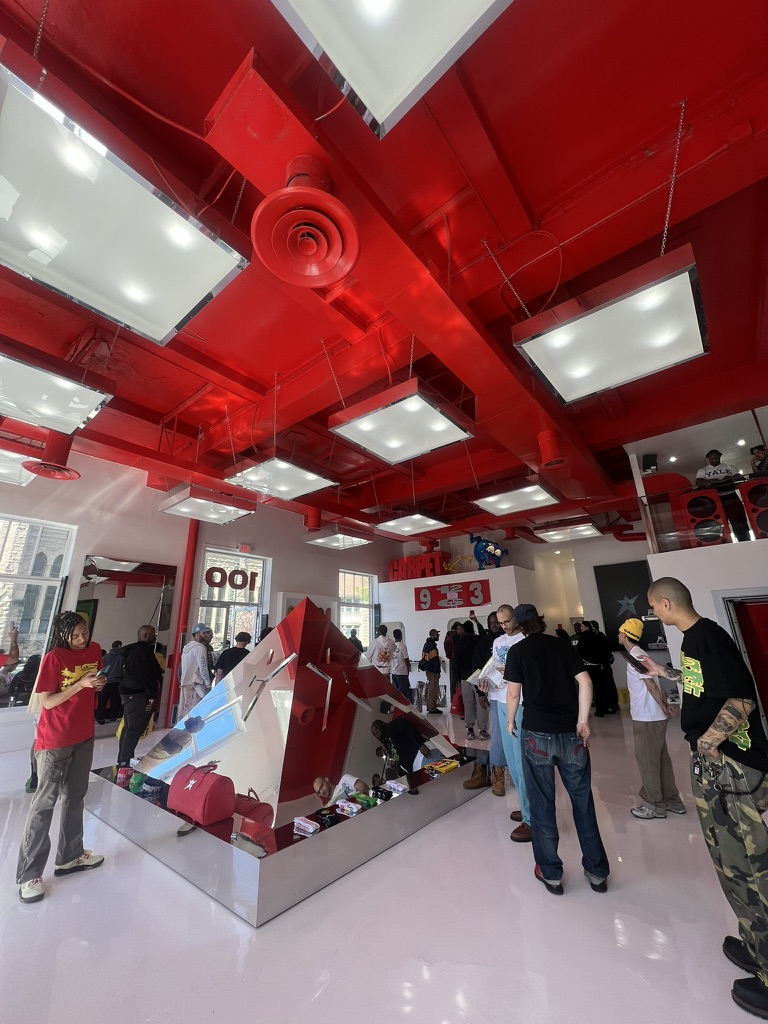
Interior of the Carpet Company flagship store in Baltimore on opening day, April 21, 2026.

On April 21, 2026, Carpet Company opened a permanent retail storefront in Baltimore's Station North neighborhood, occupying a former bank building. The opening coincided with the brand's release of drop 3 of season 21. Hundreds of people attended the grand opening, with lines stretching several blocks.

As part of the renovation, the Abdeldayem brothers restored a rotating clock on the building's corner marquee that had been non-functional for several decades.

The 10,000-square-foot store carries the brand's apparel and a curated sneaker selection. At the center of the space stands a steel pyramid polished to a mirror finish, a reference to the brothers' Egyptian heritage. The store also houses a café operated by Good Neighbor, marking the coffee shop's second Baltimore location.
