= Stefan Janoski =

American skateboarder (born 1979)

- Born: July 18, 1979 (age 47); Vacaville, California, U.S.
- Occupation: Professional skateboarder

Stefan Janoski (Macedonian: Стефан Јаноски born July 18, 1979) is an American professional skateboarder, artist, writer and musician of Macedonian descent, who is well known for his signature Nike SB shoe model, the "Nike Zoom Stefan Janoski". Among followers of professional skateboarding, Janoski is known for his "switch-stance" skills and casual style.

== Early life ==
Janoski's home town is Vacaville, California. He began skateboarding in 1992. Janoski later explained in a Nike promotional segment that he tried to emulate Mike Carroll following Carroll's video part in Plan B Skateboards' Virtual Reality. In an August 2013 interview, Janoski provided a description of the Vacaville skateboard scene:

The skate scene in Vacaville around 1992 was around 12 people or less. At my school, it was me and one or two other skaters. Mostly I skated with my friends Josh Jamison, Brian Glosser and a few guys who were 40 or 50 years older than me. Either that or I would skate by myself on an asphalt country road.

== Professional skateboarding ==
Janoski was sponsored by the Expedition One skateboard deck company and appeared in the video Alone. Janoski was then recruited to the Habitat skateboard team through original team rider Tim O'Connor, as the two skateboarded together extensively. Janoski is a supporter and participant in the Tampa Pro skateboard contest.

Following the formation of the Nike Skateboarding (Nike SB) brand in 2002—the shoe company's second attempt at establishing itself in the skateboard market—Janoski was a team selection and was given the opportunity to design his own signature shoe model for release. As of 2013, the "Nike SB Zoom Stefan Janoski" model is described as "extremely successful," "wildly successful," and "an instant classic." Janoski revealed in 2013 that he is completely responsible for the design of the shoe, following initial resistance from Nike, Inc.:

I was completely involved with the design of my shoe. The beginning was a struggle. Nike and I had two different ideas for what the shoe should be, and there were many revisions, but as it was my signature shoe, I would not compromise and we kept working until it was exactly the way I wanted.

Janoski was handpicked as a team member for Stevie Williams's clothing company Asphalt Yacht Club (AYC) that was launched in mid-July 2013. Janoski explained the process in an interview with Transworld Skateboarding:

I guess it came about through Ryan Clements. He knew Jesse Fritsch and they mentioned they were doing this new thing that was so secret they couldn’t tell me the name or who was on the team. They asked me if I’d be interested, and of course I was interested and curious. I came out and met Stevie and then we hung out in New York. Then we ended up skating in Miami. I’ve always been a fan of Stevie and it seemed like a pretty new, different type of clothing company.

=== Sponsors ===
As of September 2013, Janoski's sponsors are: Official Crown of Laurel, Nike SB, Habitat Skateboards, Venture Trucks, Glassy, Mob Grip, Bones Bearings, and Asphalt Yacht Club (AYC).

== Art ==
Janoski partnered with artist Andy Warde for the "Voyages" exhibition that opened on September 13, 2013, in Encinitas, California, US. Held at the UNIV Work Shop venue, the exhibition consists of bronze and ceramic sculptures that were created by Janoski.

== Personal life ==
Outside of skateboarding, Janoski enjoys creative pursuits, such as painting and photography. In a 2013 interview, Janoski provided further insight into his creative work outside of skateboarding:

I have always made art, ever since I can remember. I love to sculpt with clay and wax, and I have been casting into bronze too. I also paint and draw, and I love to write stories, poetry and songs. I love to play music and I try to play every instrument, but mostly I play guitar. Skateboarding has given me the freedom to follow through on all my other interests and hobbies.
