= Trevor Colden =

American skateboarder (born 1994)

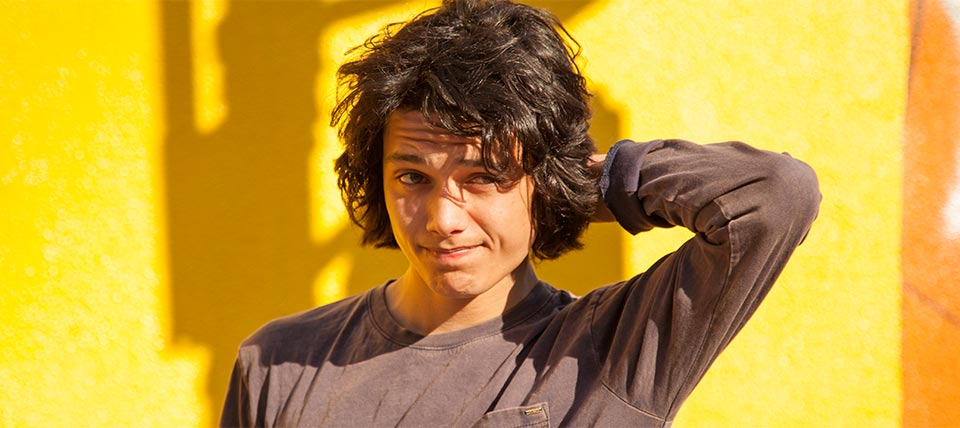
- Born: March 14, 1994 (age 31); Virginia Beach, Virginia, United States
- Occupation: Skateboarder

Trevor Colden (born March 14, 1994) is a professional skateboarder. He grew up in Virginia Beach, Virginia and later moved to Los Angeles, California when he was sixteen. He has won high ranking contest "Tampa Am" in 2011 and was one of three skateboarders to qualify for the Street League Nike SB World Tour. He currently rides for FTP Boards, Nike SB, Mountain Dew, Thunder Trucks, Mob Grip, Skullcandy, Spitfire, and Active RideShop.

== Early life ==
Colden was born in Virginia Beach, Virginia, United States. He started skating at a young age and immediately started shredding. Every day, he would go out and skate.

Trevor went to Kings Fork Middle School and stopped going to school on his 7th grade year. In 2010, Trevor visited California and ended up staying there. He lived in San Diego and ended up getting a board sponsor.

== Sponsors ==
Colden is currently sponsored by FTP Boards, Vox shoes, Spitfire, Mountain Dew, Thunder Trucks, Mob Grip, Skullcandy, and Active RideShop. He rode for Emerica, Bones Wheels and Mystery. He had to pay $15,000 to get out of the contract with Mystery but with taxes around the corner, Trevor offered $10,000 and they accepted it.

He switched from Mystery to Skate Mental with no contract. Also, he switched from Emerica to Nike SB and Bones Wheels to Spitfire. Trevor no longer rides for Skate Mental and has joined FTP Boards.

== Videography ==
Year	Video	Company			
	Color Theory	Mystery	Thrasher Skatemental	PUSH	DewTour
	Chronicle Vol. 3	Nike SB			

== Contest History ==
=== Tampa Pro ===
- Fourth Place: 2015
- Ninth Place: 2014

=== Dew Tour ===
- Sixth Place: 2015 (Los Angeles)
- Second Place: 2015 (Streetstyle/ Los Angeles)
- Second Place: 2014 (Brooklyn)
- First Place: 2014 (Streetstyle/ Brooklyn)

=== Tampa Am ===
- Eleventh Place: 2013
- First Place: 2011

=== AmsterDamn Am ===
- Third Place: 2013

=== Damn Am ===
- Third Place: 2013 (Los Angeles)
- Seventh Place: 2013 (Costa Mesa)
- Second Place: 2011 (Woodward West)

=== Kimberly Diamond Cup Street ===
- Sixth Place: 2013

=== Phoenix Am ===
- Fifth Place: 2012
- Eighth Place: 2011

=== Maloof Money Cup Am Street ===
- Fifth Place: 2011 (NYC)
