= Staple Design =

American fashion designer

- Industry: Design, Consultancy; Fashion, Retail
- Founded: New York City, U.S. (1997)
- Founder: Jeff Staple (born Jeff Ng)
- Headquarters: New York City, New York, U.S.
- Products: Clothing; Accessories
- Services: Branding, Editorial Design, Product Design, Packaging Design, Corporate Identity, Web Design
- Website: www.stapledesign.com

Staple Design is a visual communications agency based in New York City, founded in 1997 by Jeff Staple (born Jeff Ng). It has three main divisions: a clothing collection, a creative agency, and a retail store. Staple Pigeon is a menswear collection designed and distributed globally by the firm. Staple Design Studio is a creative and consulting firm that has worked with many brands including Nike, Microsoft, Sony, Lotus, Timberland, New Balance, and LVMH, alongside others. Staple Design also owns and operates a retail store called Reed Space on the Lower East Side of Manhattan in New York City, which features an art gallery.

== History ==
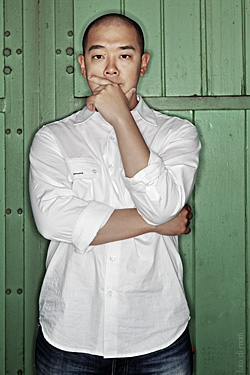
Jeff Staple, portrayed at the BreadandButter show in 2009

Jeff worked as an intern with the streetwear clothing company PNB Nation and as a graphic designer at c.i.t.e. design. He established his brand, Staple, in 1997 while silk-screening T-shirts in his spare time. Later that year, Jeff started Staple Design. Staple Design opened the retail store and art gallery Reed Space in downtown Manhattan in 2002.

In 2005, Staple Pigeon released the NYC Pigeon Dunks sneakers in collaboration with Nike. Only around 200 pairs were ever released, exclusively in New York City. Riots erupted at many of the stores where the shoes were sold. The market value of a pair of the shoes today is reportedly over US$64,000. Staple Pigeon has since manufactured and sold original works and products online.

== Products ==
Staple Design produces a globally-distributed lifestyle menswear collection. The collection is split into two main lines: Staple, which is mostly graphic and print-focused with t-Shirts and tanktops, and STPL, a cut-and-sew collection.
