= Nike Dunk =

Line of shoes by Nike

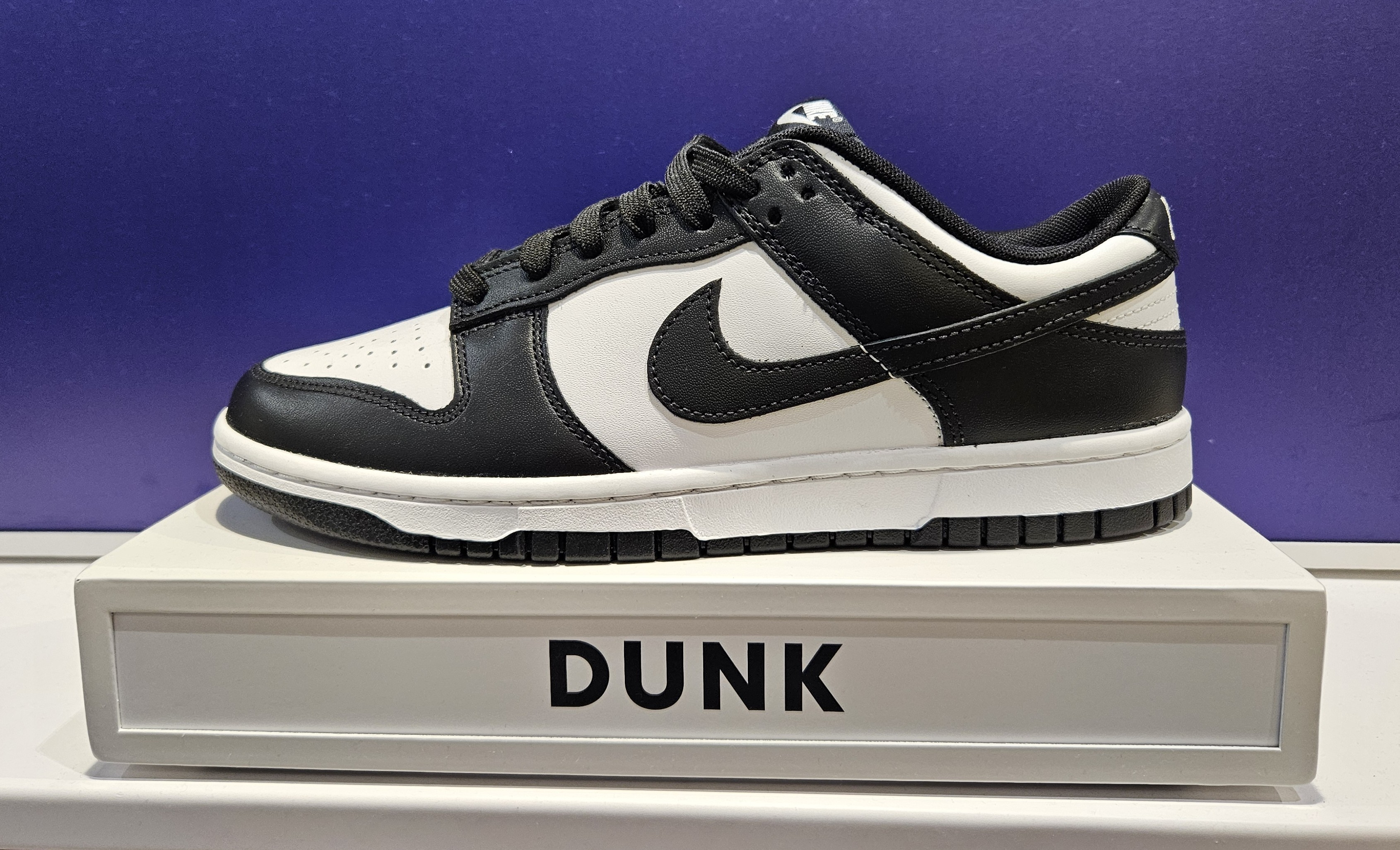
- A black and white pair of Nike Dunk shoes commonly referred to as the "Panda Dunk".
- Type: Sneakers
- Inventor: Nike, Inc.
- Inception: 1985; 41 years ago
- Manufacturer: Nike
- Available: Yes
- Website: nike.com

Nike Dunk is a line of shoes released by Nike in 1985. Originally released as a basketball shoe, several pairs of Dunks were made to match top college basketball team colors. For the original release of the Nike Dunk, Nike partnered with the University of Michigan, University of Kentucky, University of Iowa, Georgetown, Syracuse, St. John's and UNLV, and created an iconic advertisement campaign titled "Be true to your school". Eventually, the popularity of the shoe among the skating community also led to the creation of a variant used for skateboarding. The shoe is offered in low-, mid- and high-top styles.

== Overview ==
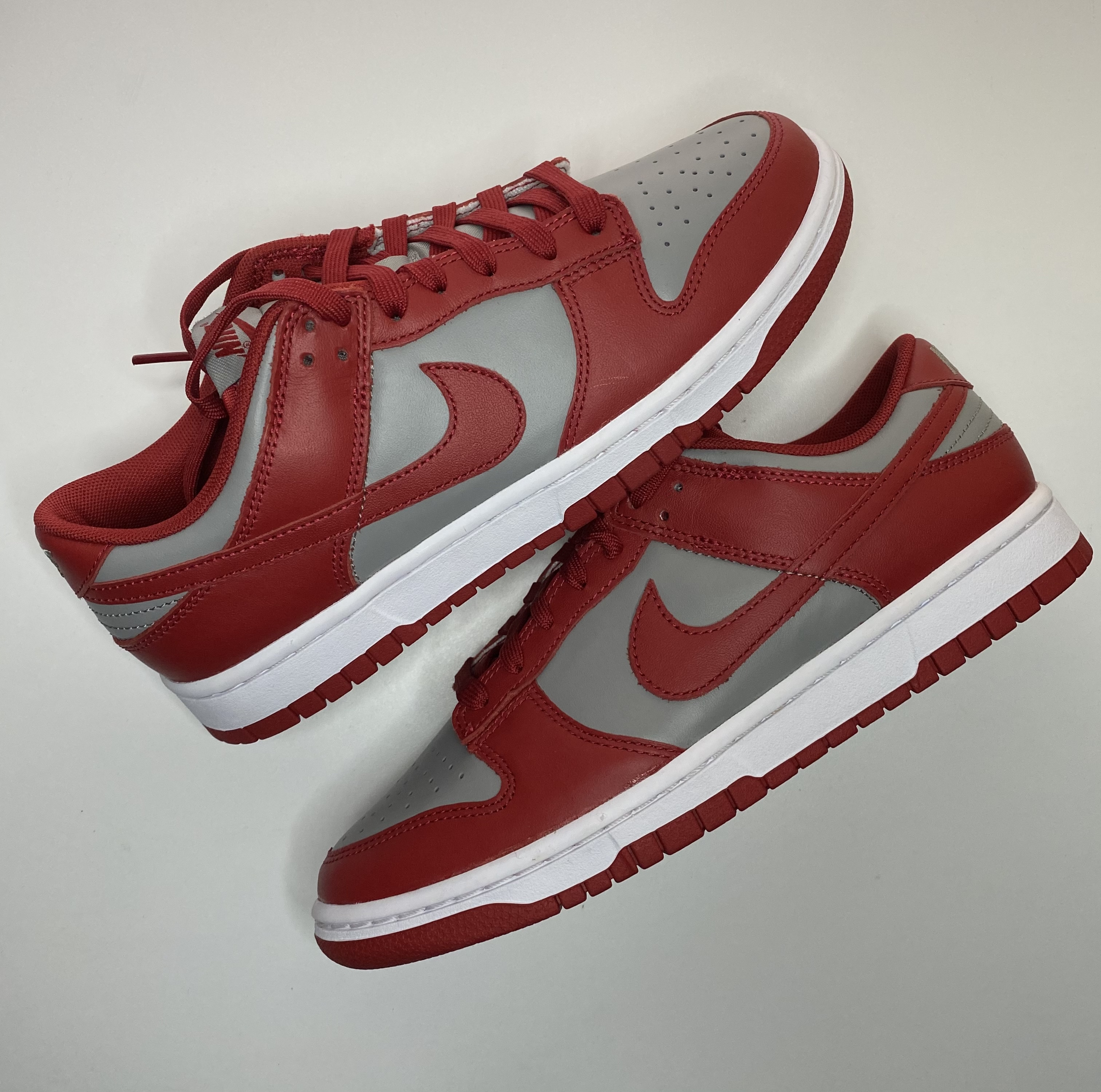
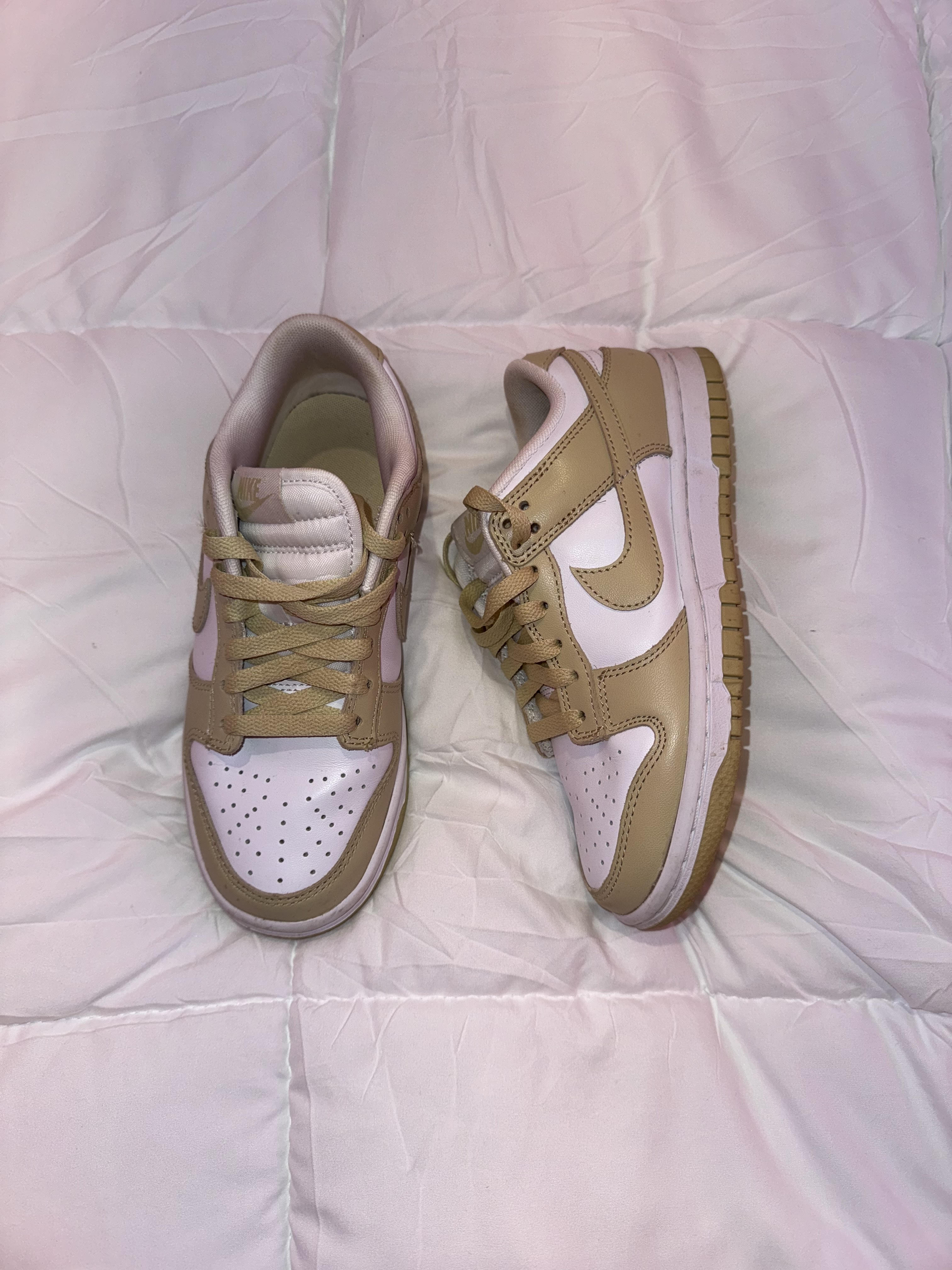
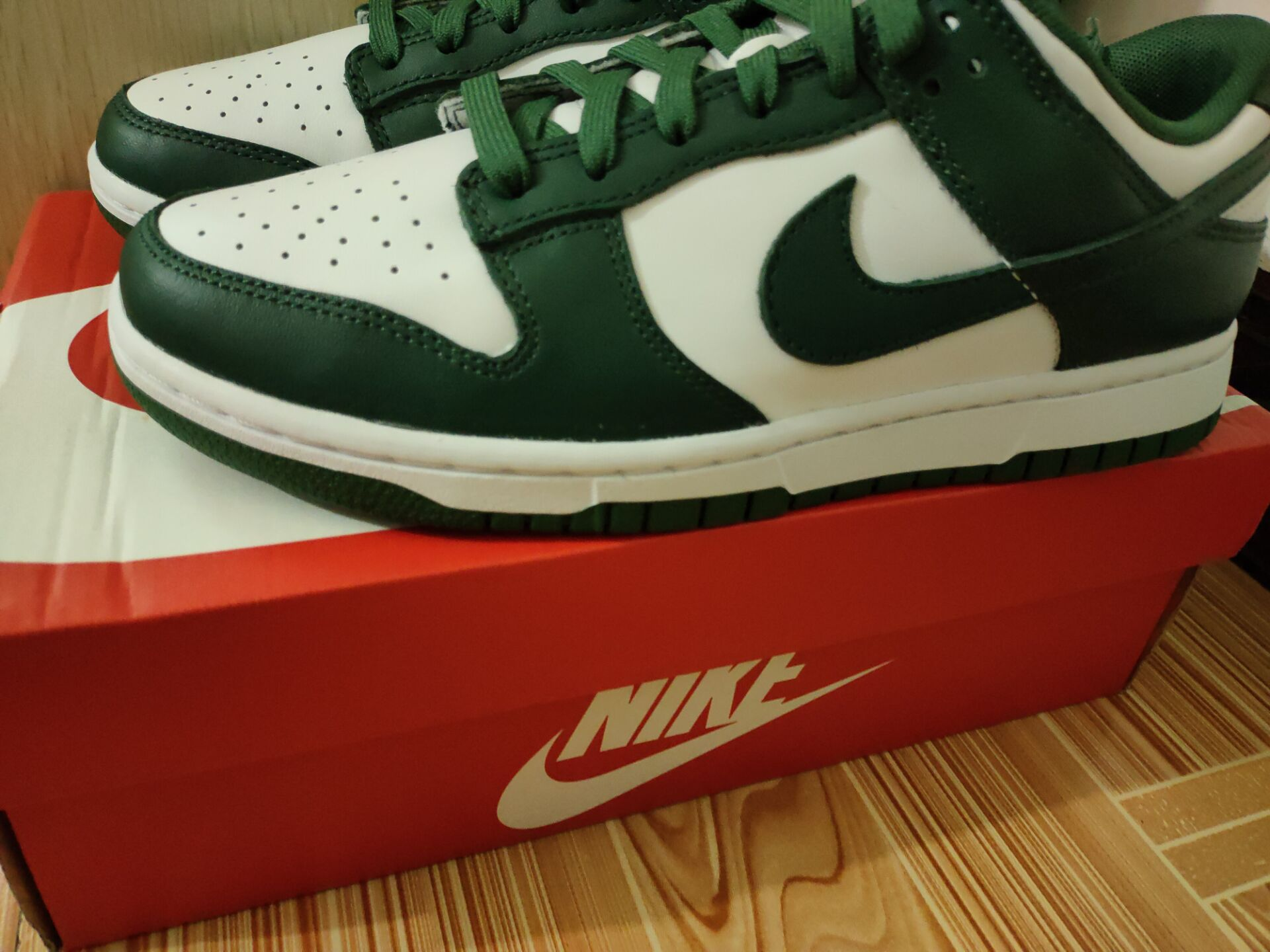
3 pair of Nike Dunks showing the distinct colorways that the model comes in.

Originally called the College Color High, the shoe was designed by Peter Moore and took elements from the Legend, Terminator, and Air Force 1 shoes. The shoe was popular when it was first released due in part to the different color schemes that were released. These were created to represent the different colors of universities and their basketball teams.

== Models ==
=== Air Dunk ===
A version of the dunk that features the original upper of the shoe but with the sole of the Nike Air Train that contains the company's air technology.

=== SB Dunk ===
SB Dunk was used by Nike to enter the skateboarding market, launching a variant of the shoe made exclusively for skateboarding. In establishing itself, Nike signed famous skaters such as Reese Forbes, Richard Mulder, Gino Ianucci, and Danny Supa to the first Nike SB skate team. The shoe was successful among skateboarders and eventually achieved mainstream popularity and kept the line popular well into the 2000s.

=== Air Dunk Jumbo ===
A chunkier version of the shoe that features premium suede materials in the upper with a bigger tongue and the sole includes the company's air technology to make it more comfortable to wear. It was released in 2022.

=== Collaborations ===
Nike has collaborated with various companies and artists on the release of Dunk colorways.

Collaborations with Chocolate Skateboards and Zoo York released in 2002. Collaborations with Supreme, Futura, Bernard Buffet, and Eric Haze were released in 2003. A collaboration with Unkle was released in 2004. Collaborations with Stash and Stüssy were released in 2005. A collaboration with Michael Lau was released in 2006. A collaboration with MF Doom was released in 2007. A collaboration with Comme des Garçons was released in 2017. Collaborations with Travis Scott, and Ben & Jerry's released in 2020. In 2021, a collaboration with Carpet Company was released. Collaborations with Stranger Things and Kirkland Signature were released in 2025.
