= Matt Mumford =

Australian professional skateboarder (born 1974)

Matt Mumford (born 6 April 1974) is an Australian professional skateboarder.

== Early life ==
Mumford was born in Brisbane, Queensland, Australia, and grew up in Rockhampton, Queensland, Australia.

== Professional skateboarding ==
Mumford first gained attention when photographed by J Grant Brittain while skateboarding in his local area; at the time, Brittain was on tour with Mike McGill. Mumford later traveled to the United States (US) in 1993 to pursue a skateboarding career and was initially sponsored by McGill's Chapter 7 brand (later renamed "Shaft"), before moving to Invisible Skateboards.

Mumford was then asked by professional skateboarder Jamie Thomas to join a new brand at the time, Zero Skateboards, in 1996.

Following Mumford's sponsorship deal with the Globe shoe company, he released signature shoe models named "Mumford" (2003) and "The Alter". Mumford was featured on the cover of Thrasher Magazine in March 2004 performing the "crail slide" skateboard trick.

Following a brief stint with the now-defunct Adio shoe brand, Mumford was then recruited by the Supra footwear brand and joined team members such as Erik Ellington and Jim Greco. Mumford released a shoe model as part of Supra's Vaider low pack in 2011.

=== Sponsors ===
As of November 2013, Mumford is sponsored by Slave, Supra, Theeve Trucks, Bones Wheels and Shake Junt.

== Personal life ==
As of November 2013, Mumford resides in Encinitas, California, US.

== Filmography ==
- Zero: Thrill of It All (1997)
- Zero: Misled Youth (1999)
- Zero: "Dying To Live" (2001)
- Transworld: The Reason (1999)
- Globe: Opinion (2001)
- Black Label: Back in Black (2006)
- Globe: United by Fate 1 (2007)
- Globe: United by Fate 2 (2007)
- Globe: Money for Blood (2007)
- Globe: United by Fate 3 (2008)
- Globe: United by Fate 4 (2008)
- Globe: United by Fate 5 (2009)
- Globe: United by Fate 6 (2010)
- Slave: Radio/Television (2009)
