= Skateboarding Australia =

Sports governing body in Australia

- Sport: Skateboarding
- Jurisdiction: Australia
- Abbreviation: SbA
- Founded: 2005
- Affiliation: Skate Australia
- (Australia)

Skateboarding Australia (SbA) was the governing body for skateboarding in Australia and is funded by the Australian Federal Government via the Australian Sports Commission (ASC).

== History ==
=== Formation ===
Skateboarding Australia was established in 2005 by the Board members of National Sporting Organisation, Skate Australia (SA).

=== Demise ===
In April 2014, SbA managers made a proposal to Sport Australia to separate skateboarding from Skate Australia and establish a national sporting organisation solely for skateboarding with the majority of funding going to it. This proposal was made without the knowledge of the Skate Australia management or Board. Sport Australia declined and the leader of SbA, Leroy magarnagle, was terminated for gross misconduct.

In early August 2014, the parent body of SBA, SA, announced significant structural changes following the appointment of a new chief executive officer (CEO), Dallas Eastley. Former SBA employee Andrew Currie explained on his Facebook page that SA prioritized the attainment of a surplus budget—despite its status as a non-profit organisation—and consequently determined the completion of the National Skateboard Amateur Series, a contest series for amateur skateboarders, as an "unacceptable risk to the organisation". Curry explained:

Despite having completed six of eight stops, with 48 skateboarders qualified (many of whom had already booked and paid for flights and accommodation for the advertised Final in October), and only the Queensland and New South Wales Qualifying stops remaining, the Skate Australia CEO and Board Of Directors determined that, in a year when a major financial partner (Anpha) has been lost, the pursuit of a surplus budget (for a non-profit organisation) was paramount to completing the Titles.

Curry's post also states that the result of SA's decision harmed the reputation of SbA, removed the possibility of an amateur series for 2015 and led to the loss of employment of the majority of skateboarding staff at SbA. Curry maintained that "Skateboarding continues to be grossly under-represented in the Skate Australia constitution."

A response from SA was published on the SbA website on 5 August 2014, in which Eastley explained that information was omitted from Curry's post. Eastley stated:

We feel compelled to respond to this statement and provide additional information purposefully omitted from this statement in order to provide a complete picture of why it was not possible for the organisation to complete the Am Titles event series.

Firstly, in the 3 years to June 2014, the activities of Skateboarding Australia (SbA) under the leadership of former SbA/SA management have generated approximately $325,000 in financial losses to the organisation, Skate Australia has maintained its support of Skateboarding each year as these losses accumulated. These losses have now accumulated and significantly weakened the organisation to the point where we no longer have the ability to absorb any further losses.

With respect to the Am Titles series, this agreement was negotiated in June 2013 by both SA and SbA’s management at that time. The Nike Am Titles agreement extended from June 2013, through to completion in December 2015 (incorporating both the 2014 and 2015 Am Titles series calendars).

The series was co-sponsored by the Australian National Preventative Health Agency (ANPHA), this sponsorship provided approximately 50% of the required funding for the Am Titles series. This sponsorship had a clearly defined end date of 30th June 2014, with any possible extension yet to be determined.

Those responsible for negotiating this agreement and associated Am Titles series have failed to consider the impact and plan accordingly for the loss of ANPHA sponsorship at 30th June 2014.

Given the organisations weakened financial position following the financial losses generated by SbA over the past 3 years, the organisation found itself in a position where even considering all alternative avenues on the table from the ASC and Nike, the organisation was not financially able to continue the series, and remain solvent.

The mutual agreement reached between SbA and Nike regarding the termination of the series was absolutely necessary in order to ensure survival of both Skate Australia, and Skateboarding Australia (SbA).

Skate Australia & Skateboarding Australia remains committed to promoting the growth and development of Skateboarding in Australia, and creating opportunities for Skateboarders nationally.

On 14 August 2014, Australian professional skateboarder Renton Millar appeared in Australia's Herald Sun newspaper, calling for a "break-away national body" following SA's actions—Miller cited "poor management" as the salient issue.

In later years Millar re-established his relationship with Skate Australia, becoming a judge at the Tokyo 2020 Olympics.

== See also ==
- Australian Bowl-riding Championships
