= Jake Duncombe =

Australian skateboarder

- Born: Tweed Heads, New South Wales, Australia
- Other names: Teenage Wildman, Snake Eyes, Gremlin
- Occupation: Professional skateboarder

Jake Duncombe is an Australian professional skateboarder who was awarded SLAM magazine's Australian "Skater of the Year" award in 2006, and was one of the youngest professional sportspeople in Australia in 2004. Duncombe was sponsored by the Blind Skateboards skateboard deck company, founded by Mark Gonzales, for nine years and released a signature model skate shoe with Globe International.

== Early life ==
After being born in Tweed Heads, New South Wales, Australia, Duncombe relocated with his family to the area around Brunswick Heads and Byron Bay, both in the Australian state of New South Wales. Duncombe first began skateboarding at the age of eight or nine years while in Brunswick Heads after being influenced by a family friend—his father subsequently purchased a "Delta"-brand skateboard for him to ride. Duncombe's first skateboarding sponsor was Wreck surf shop in Byron Bay and he then received free products from Electric Sunglasses, as representatives of the brand were from Byron Bay.

== Professional skateboarding ==
Duncombe's first major sponsors were SMP and Carel, and he was 12 years of age when he embarked on his first tour with the SMP team, which also included Jamie Goodwin, Ryan Hidassy and Lachlan Pettit. At the time, Duncombe was still attending school and, after a short period skateboarding with SMP in Sydney, he relocated with his father to Gold Coast, Queensland, Australia. Duncombe's father eventually allowed Duncombe to leave school and focus on skateboarding during their time in Queensland.

After the founding of Criminal Skateboards by Sydney skateboarder Glen Scott, Duncombe was recruited by Scott and he joined the team, which also included Andrew Currie, Kerry Fisher and Jim Fowlie, on a tour of Canberra, Australia. Duncombe explained in a 2014 interview with Scott that he believed he was accepted by the older Criminal team because of his willingness to drink a similar level of alcohol. Scott, who was also involved with the SMP brand, oversaw Duncombe's first international tours to New Zealand and Europe.

Duncombe competed at the 2003 World Cup in Melbourne, Australia, at the age of 14 years, and placed second, prior to appearing in the 2004 video Northern Lights. With six sponsors supporting him and a crowd of 15,000 spectators watching, Duncombe also competed at the 2004 World Cup but did not proceed past the first round. During an interview at the 2004 World Cup, Duncombe revealed his situation in terms of skateboarding: "It's still my hobby. It'll always still be my hobby. Sometimes I don't realise how lucky I am to get paid for it. Um, it's unbelievable, like, getting paid to do your hobby, it's just... I'm so happy."

During the 2003 World Cup, Duncombe was riding for World Industries alongside fellow Australian Richard Flude, and was asked to ride for Blind Skateboards—Blind team member James Craig and Cory Shepard initially expressed interest—during a subsequent tour organised by the distributors of both World and Blind. After Duncombe informally agreed to join the brand, it was on his next visit to the United States (US) that he was asked to join the team by brand manager Bill Weiss. Duncombe explained in 2014:

... and, we're skating this 13-stair rail ... "So, we want you on Blind." [Weiss] ... I'm [Duncombe] like, "Are you serious?" He's like, "Yep, and you need a video part out and an ad in three months." I'm like, "Ooo ... kaaay." ... Then, that's when I was just like, "Alright, this is happening."

Blind called Duncombe into the offices of the brand's American distributor, Dwindle Distribution, in 2006 and informed him that he had been assigned professional status by the brand, providing him with his first signature skateboard deck design and a giant cookie. Both Duncombe and fellow team rider Jani Laitiala were announced as professional riders in August 2006 and Duncombe's first model, which used the same design as the Jack Daniel's alcohol brand, was forced off the market after a cease and desist order.

In 2010 Duncombe's first signature skate shoe model, named "The Bender", was released by Globe. The shoe release event was a party on a boat in Newport Beach, California, California, US and Duncombe's family were flown from Australia to attend.

After nine years with Blind and a similarly lengthy period with the Globe footwear brand, Duncombe parted ways with both sponsors over 2012 and 2013. Duncombe explained in a December 2013 interview that his pay cheques from Blind progressively lessened, as new younger riders joined the team, and his contract finally ended along with other older team riders, such as Craig and Jake Brown. In terms of Globe, Duncombe stated: "I think we just got sick of each other ... They just got sick of my antics and I wasn’t ready to change. ‘Time for change’ – no, no change." In his 2014 interview with Scott, Duncombe provided further insight into his personality by revealing that he is the type of person who instinctively acts in opposition to what others are trying to change or instil within him.

Following the founding of the Life Extension (LE) Skateboards skateboard deck company, by professional skateboarder Nick Trapasso and Pat "Sinner" Pasquale, Duncombe contacted the cofounders and negotiated a place on the team. Duncombe said that the brand "was something new and fresh and I saw a chance to be a part of it from its start." Duncombe filmed a video part for LE's debut video, Theatrix, which premiered in the US in July 2014, and the part was also promoted on the Thrasher magazine website. The Australian premiere of the video was held on 28 July 2014.

=== Sponsors ===
As of 2024, Duncombe is sponsored by Terminal Four Skateboards.

== Awards ==
Following his international skateboard video debut in What If?, Duncombe was awarded the "Skater of the Year" accolade by Australian skateboard publication SLAM. The magazine explained in 2013: "... a 17-year-old Jake Duncombe took the title in 2006. A massive year of ripping in Europe and the USA, and this heavy debut international part in the Blind video, What If?, made Jake the undisputed winner."
