= Joe Frantz =

American filmmaker

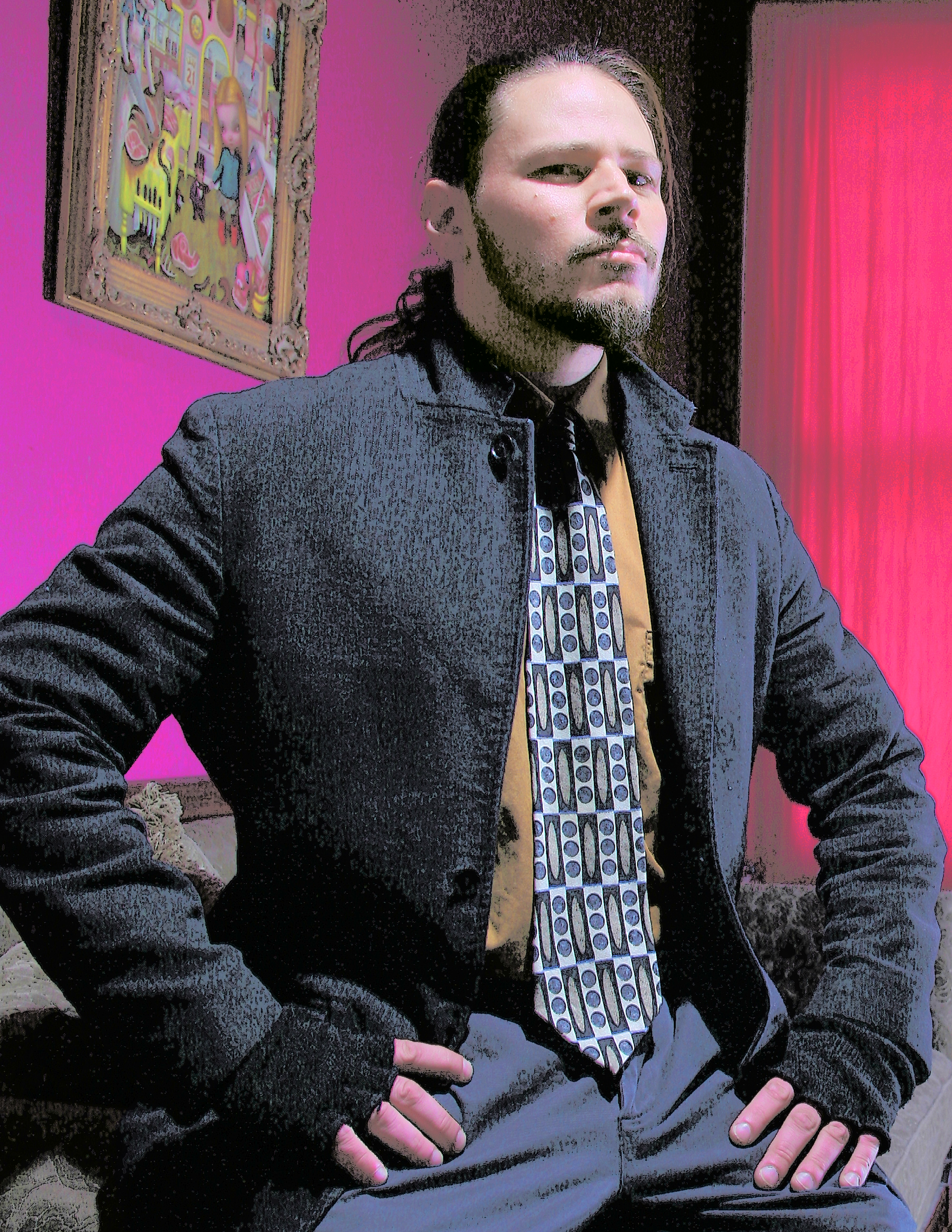
- Frantz in 2017
- Occupations: Cinematographer, producer, director
- Years active: 1994–present
- Website: joefrantz.com

Joe Frantz is an American producer, cinematographer, director, and former member of Bam Margera's CKY crew. His body of works includes the CKY video series, Haggard: The Movie, reality television shows such as Viva La Bam and Bam's Unholy Union, Jackass Number Two, Jackass 2.5, Jackassworld.com: 24 Hour Takeover, Jackass 3D, and Jackass 3.5, and music videos for bands such as HIM, CKY, Clutch, and the 69 Eyes.

Frantz is also a collaborative co-author of the book Dreamseller, which he wrote with MTV / Jackass personality Brandon Novak. Frantz is a television documentary producer and cinematographer whose works have aired on National Geographic, The History Channel, Animal Planet, Discovery Channel, and The Travel Channel.

== CKY ==
=== The CKY video series ===
Frantz is noted for serving as cinematographer for the CKY video series, a predecessor to the Jackass franchise. The series was directed by Bam Margera and starred the CKY crew, as well as popular extreme sports icons such as Tony Hawk. As director of photography for CKY 3 and CKY4, Frantz introduced high production quality 35-millimeter and 16-millimeter film sequences to the action sports genre, which was then primarily shot on various low quality videotape formats. Among the most noted film segments in the CKY videos are the "Shopping Cart Slams" and the "HeMan BeastMan" music video for the band Gnarkill (for which Frantz also crafted the stop-motion animation sequences).

=== CKY: The Greatest Hits ===
In 2014, Frantz directed and produced the one-hour documentary CKY: The Greatest Hits, which highlights the most memorable moments and unreleased footage from the CKY videos, and features commentary from Bam Margera and the CKY crew, with special appearances by Johnny Knoxville and Jeff Tremaine of Jackass.

== Independent films ==
=== Haggard: The Movie ===
Following the international success of the CKY videos, Bam Margera approached Frantz with the script for his independent motion picture directorial debut, a comedy titled Haggard: The Movie (2003). Directed by, starring, and financed by Margera, Haggard co-stars Ryan Dunn and the CKY crew, and features cameos by skateboard legends Tony Hawk and Bucky Lasek. For the production of Haggard, Frantz developed a production method through which he could serve dual roles as both producer and director of photography, and shot the movie in super-16 millimeter film.

=== Minghags: The Movie ===
Directed by and starring Bam Margera and the cast of MTV's Viva La Bam, Minghags: The Movie (2009) is an homage to one of Margera's and Frantz's favorite genres, born out of the 1980s, the "Screwball Comedy" (such films as John Landis' Kentucky Fried Movie and Amazon Women on the Moon). As co-director, executive producer, and director of photography, Frantz shot it in super-16 millimeter film, in the same colorful style as its predecessor, Haggard: The Movie.

=== Bam Margera Presents: Where the ♯$&% Is Santa? ===
Bam Margera Presents: Where the ♯$&% Is Santa? (2008) is a modern-day Christmas saga, a reality comedy feature reminiscent of the MTV predecessor Viva La Bam, in which Bam Margera and Brandon Novak trek across Finland to find Santa Claus in order to make good on a bet with Jimmy Pop of the Bloodhound Gang. They are also joined by the Dudesons. The film features other cameos by Kat Von D, CKY, and Andy McCoy of Hanoi Rocks. Frantz served as the film's co-executive producer, writer, and director of photography, and appeared in a cameo role.

== Jackass ==
Frantz is noted for his camera work in Jackass Number Two (2006), Jackass 2.5 (2007), Jackassworld.com: 24 Hour Takeover (2008) (in which Frantz made his first Jackass cameo appearance), Jackass 3D (2010), and Jackass 3.5 (2011). Frantz is also noted for shooting the "lost" Jackass Number Two scene of Don Vito, the "Don Vito Tooth Pull" (2006), in which Vito had his tooth pulled out via a string attached to the rear bumper of Bam Margera's Lamborghini Gallardo. The footage quickly became the "big stunt" in the official Jackass Number Two trailer. Due to legal allegations centered around Don Vito, the footage was omitted from the film, and it is rumored that Frantz still owns Vito's tooth. A few seconds of the lost footage can be seen in the original Jackass Number Two trailer. He was asked to work on Jackass Forever (2022), and Jackass 4.5 (2022), but declined the offer.

== Reality TV ==
=== Viva La Bam ===
The Jackass spin-off Viva La Bam, MTV's scripted-reality series starred Bam Margera and his friends from Jackass and the CKY videos, known as the "CKY crew". The program was shot from 2003 to 2006 (from pilot to the "Viva La Spring Break" special). Each episode presented a theme or mission, and took the cast and crew on journeys across the United States, South America, Europe, and Scandinavia. The show also often featured appearances of Margera's favorite bands and celebrity friends such as HIM, CKY, Clutch, Slayer, Gwar, The Bloodhound Gang, Johnny Knoxville, and Tony Hawk.

For Viva La Bam's five-season duration, Frantz served as director of photography and contributed to the aesthetic of the show by shooting scenes and montages in super-16 and 35-millimeter film, using a variety of experimental cinematographic in-camera techniques (such as stop-motion), producing the only motion picture film presented on a reality program in the history of television.

=== Bam's Unholy Union ===
Frantz was producer and director of photography of the Jackass/Viva La Bam spinoff Bam's Unholy Union (2007). The series chronicled the marriage of Bam Margera to his high school sweetheart Melissa "Missy" Rothstein, and featured Ryan Dunn, Brandon DiCamillo, Brandon Novak, Rake Yohn, and Frantz in a cameo role.

=== MTV's Blastazoid ===
MTV's Blastazoid was the featured show on MTV's highly advertised "Gamers Week". The half-hour special was created by MTV's internal division with Joe Frantz and Brandon DiCamillo, who were signed on as producers to head up the project shortly after approaching MTV with their idea to create a "Live-Action Donkey Kong"; a five-story, life-sized version of the classic arcade game.

Blastazoid chronicled the lives of hosts Frantz, DiCamillo, and Rake Yohn, as they brought "Live-Action Donkey Kong" to life. It also showcased user-created gaming, fan, and tribute footage found on the internet. Although MTV's Blastazoid Special ended with a trailer for a "Live-Action Frogger" episode, the teaser was a spoof and Blastazoid had never been intended for a series.

== Music videos and documentaries ==
=== HIM ===
Frantz has served as both producer and director of photography with director Bam Margera on four music videos for Finnish band HIM:

- "Buried Alive by Love" (featuring Natural Born Killers star Juliette Lewis) (2003)
- "The Sacrament" (2004)
- "And Love Said No" (2004)
- "Solitary Man" (2004).

The international success of the HIM videos initiated the production of a series of documentary features by Margera and Frantz:

- HIM: The Making of "Buried Alive by Love" (2003)
- HIM: The Making of "The Sacrament" (2004)
- HIM: The Making of "And Love Said No" (2004)
- BAM presents HIM: The Making of "Dark Light" (2005)

Interspersed with Margera's signature antics, the documentaries highlight the history of the band and depict challenges of the video productions.

=== CKY ===
In 1999, Frantz served as producer and director of photography with director Bam Margera for the CKY video "96 Quite Bitter Beings" (1999). The video was a success on MTV's Total Request Live, and the Margera / Frantz team has since released a total of thirteen CKY music videos, the most popular of which were played on MTV: "Flesh into Gear" (2001), "Attached at the Hip" (2002), "A#1 Roller Rager" (2009), and the half-hour music documentary The Making of "A#1 Roller Rager". In addition, Margera and Frantz created the DVD release of Infiltrate•Destroy•Rebuild: The Video Album (2003), which features twelve music videos and behind-the-scenes documentary features.

=== The 69 Eyes ===
Frantz has served as both producer and director of photography with director Bam Margera on three music videos for the Finnish band 69 Eyes: "Lost Boys" (2005), "Dead Girls Are Easy" (2009), and "Dead and Gone" (2009). The videos received heavy rotation on music video channels such as Kerrang! TV, and The Box, throughout Europe, Scandinavia, and the United Kingdom.

=== Barrington Levy ===
In 2010, under the direction of Caesar Augustus, Frantz produced reggae legend Barrington Levy's "NO WAR" music video. It was shot in Frantz's hometown of Philadelphia, Pennsylvania, and features Kardinal Offishal, Ninjaman, Louie Rankin, and Wayne Wonder. The video thematically encompasses unity of the underclass in urban culture.

=== The Bloodhound Gang ===
Frantz directed the Bloodhound Gang's music video "Screwing You on the Beach at Night" (2008), which is a visual parody of the classic black-and-white Chris Isaak "Wicked Game" video. Frantz reconstructed the "Wicked Game" video shot-per-shot, using the same camera angles, lenses, and shot composition as the original. Bloodhound Gang frontman Jimmy Pop's performance is a spoof of Chris Isaak's notably sexy performance, in which Jimmy plays a drooling, cross-eyed, girl-chasing simpleton.

=== Viking Skull ===
Viking Skull's signature lifestyle of "drinking and rocking" is depicted in the videos directed by Bam Margera with Frantz as producer and director of photography: "Blackened Sunrise" (2007) and "Hair of the Dog" (2009).

=== Clutch ===
Frantz teamed up with director Bam Margera to produce and film the music video for hard rock band Clutch's "The Mob Goes Wild" (2004). The video features antics from Ryan Dunn and Brandon DiCamillo of Jackass.

=== Vinnie Paz and Jedi Mind Tricks ===
As a lifelong friend of rapper Vinnie Paz, Frantz directed the first video of Paz's band Jedi Mind Tricks called "I Who Have Nothing" (1996), which features experimental in-camera animation and effects shot on a 16-millimeter Bolex camera. When frontman Paz pursued his solo career, Frantz served as director and cinematographer for Paz's debut video "Keep Movin' On" (2010). The video features cameos from several of Frantz's friends and associates: Philadelphia personality Tony Luke Jr., Scott Vogel of the hardcore band Terror, and Gina Lynn of the adult film world. Frantz followed the release with the Vinnie Paz documentary "Keep Movin' On: A Portrait of Vinnie Paz".

=== Viva La Bands ===
The CD/DVD sets Viva La Bands (2005) and Viva La Bands, Volume 2 (2007) were released by skater/Jackass alumnus Bam Margera and had international distribution. The CDs are compilations of songs from Margera's favorite bands. The DVD features include popular music videos, behind-the-scenes documentaries, and the "lost episode" of Viva La Bam, titled "Iceland Waterfall", which were directed by Margera and produced and filmed by Frantz.

== Books ==
=== Dreamseller ===
Frantz is a collaborative co-author of the book Dreamseller, which he wrote with MTV / Jackass personality Brandon Novak. This "cautionary tale" chronicles Novak's career as a young professional skateboarder, descent into heroin addiction, and subsequent rise to MTV fame. Frantz documented the life of Novak in "Dreamseller: The Documentary Series. The film outlines Novak's career, and the effects of drug addiction on relationships, and features interviews with Novak's mother, as well as Bam Margera, Tony Hawk, Bucky Lasek, and Ryan Dunn, who comment on their relationships with Novak and his history of drug abuse. In December 2007, on an episode of Radio Bam on Sirius Radio, Frantz accuses Novak of being high, frisks him, and uncovers hidden drugs. Consequently, Margera, Frantz, and company kicked Novak out of Margera's studio and sent him home. In March 2009, in an attempt to dissuade young people from trying drugs, Frantz interviewed Novak who was then committed to a mental institution for recovery from prescription drug addiction. Frantz and Novak have started writing the second book in the Dreamseller series, which is centered around Novak's relationship with his father, now deceased.

== Radio shows ==
=== Radio Bam ===
Frantz was a regular guest host on the Sirius Satellite Radio program Radio Bam until its end in 2013. The show featured Bam Margera and guests.

=== The Novak and Frantz Show ===
Since 2018, Frantz is the co-host of The Novak and Frantz Show on the Might Be News Network with fellow CKY crew member Brandon Novak. On the show, they discuss sobriety, film-making, current events, and their Jackass careers. They have had Chris Raab, Rake Yohn, Phil Margera, and April Margera as guests.

== Filmography ==
=== Film ===
Year	Film	Role	Notes
1994	Crumb	Himself (uncredited)	Documentary
1997	Chasing Amy		Production assistant
1998	Toy Machine: Jump Off A Building		Camera operator
1999	CKY	Himself	Producer
2000	CKY2K	Himself	Producer; Cinematographer
2001	CKY3	Himself	Producer; Cinematographer
2001	CKY Documentary		Producer
2002	CKY4: The Latest & Greatest	Himself	Producer; Cinematographer
2003	Haggard: The Movie		Producer; Cinematographer; Camera operator
2006	Jackass Number Two		Camera operator
2007	Jackass 2.5		Camera operator
2008	Bam Margera Presents: Where the #$%& Is Santa?	Himself	Director of cinematography Producer; Writer
2009	Minghags	Professor Nefer and Scotty Ledouche's Cohort	Writer; Executive producer Cinematographer; Editor
2010	Jackass 3D		Camera operator
2011	Jackass 3.5		Camera operator
2011	Skittin Across America: Skit A-Palooza	Himself	
2013	blockheaDs the Movie		Cinematographer
2017	The Fast Food King		Documentary; Cinematographer
TBD	The Brandon Novak Story	Himself	Documentary; Cinematographer; Executive producer Editor

=== Television ===
Year	Title	Role	Notes
2000-2001	Jackass		Camera operator for CKY clips
2003-2006	Viva La Bam	Himself	Cinematographer
2006	Blastazoid	Himself	Co-creator; Writer; Producer; Director
2007	Bam's Unholy Union	Himself	Producer; Cinematographer
2008	Jackassworld.com: 24 Hour Takeover	Himself	TV special Camera operator
2008	Bamimation	Himself (voice)	Co-creator; Writer; Executive producer
2010	Bam's World Domination	Himself	TV special Director; Executive producer Cinematographer
2011	A Tribute to Ryan Dunn	Himself	TV documentary
2013-2014	Diggers		Producer
2014	CKY: The Greatest Hits	Himself	TV special Director; Writer; Executive producer
2014-2015	Filthy Riches		Cinematographer; Field producer
2017	Epicly Later'd: Bam Margera		TV documentary Cinematographer
2018	Drunk History: Germany		TV special Director; Writer; Producer

== Trivia ==
Frantz's first gig in the film industry was as a production assistant on Chasing Amy (1997). It was short-lived, as on his first day, he accidentally shut down the set for an hour during a key scene by triggering an alarm on a nearby building.
