= Brandon Novak =

American skateboarder and motivational speaker

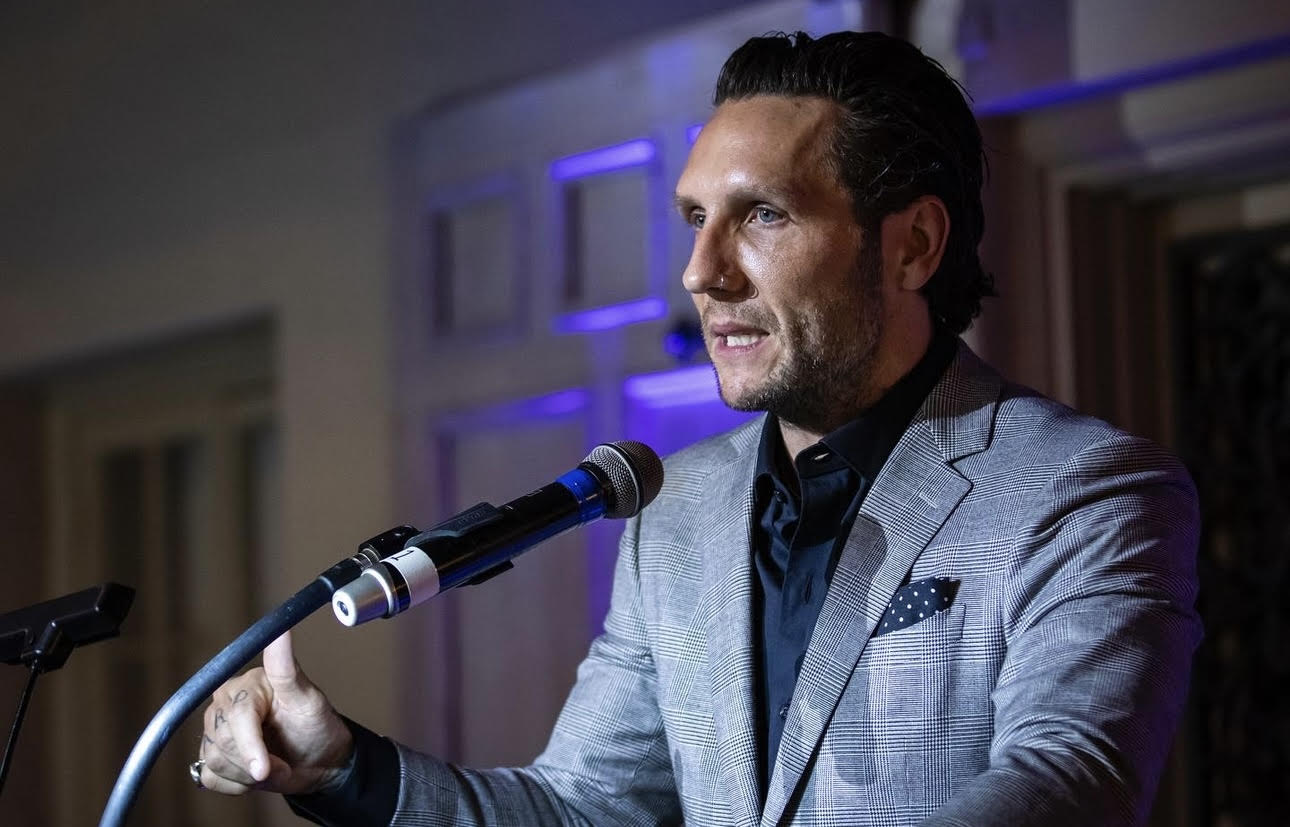
- Novak in 2022
- Born: Brandon Thomas Novak; December 10, 1978 (age 47); Baltimore, Maryland, U.S.
- Occupations: Skateboarder; stunt performer; author; speaker
- Years active: 1992–present
- Known for: Jackass; Viva La Bam
- Website: brandonnovak.com

Brandon Thomas Novak (born December 10, 1978) is an American motivational speaker, author, and former professional skateboarder and CKY crew member. He also had appearances in the Viva La Bam reality comedy series.

== Early life ==
Novak was born on December 10, 1978, in Baltimore, Maryland.

== Career ==
=== Professional skateboarding ===
Novak started skateboarding at seven years old and was soon discovered by Bucky Lasek. He was the first skateboarder in the world to be sponsored by Gatorade at 14 years old. At this same time, he was a professional skateboarder on the Powell Peralta Team, traveling the country with Bucky Lasek, Bam Margera, Tony Hawk, and others. Due to his substance abuse he was presented with the option to quit or attend rehab which he chose to quit.

Upon achieving sobriety in 2015, Novak returned to skateboarding. In 2020, he finally achieved his dream of creating a pro-deck with The Heart Supply (run by CEO and Founder of Element, Johnny Schillereff). They released the Brandon Novak Heart Supply collection in June 2020.

In July 2021, Novak and fellow professional skateboarder Joey Jett released a short film of their journey to Barcelona titled "The Awakening" showcasing their skateboarding and journey.

=== Entertainment persona ===
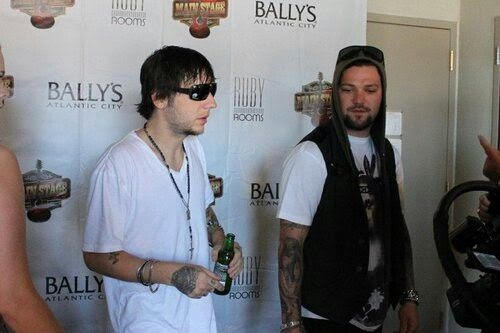
Novak (left) and Margera (right) in the mid-2000s

Novak makes appearances in CKY3 (2001), and CKY4: The Latest & Greatest (2002), and in Bam Margera's films Haggard (2003), and Minghags (2009). In Haggard, Novak plays a friendly drug dealer named Dooli, which was the real nickname of Novak's dealer in northwest Baltimore. He also appeared in Bam's TV shows Viva La Bam (2003-2006), Bam's Unholy Union (2007), and Bam's Bad Ass Game Show (2014), and also made guest appearances in the Jackass movies Jackass Number Two (2006), Jackass 2.5 (2007), Jackass 3D (2010), and Jackass 3.5 (2011).

He appeared regularly on the SIRIUS Satellite Radio show Radio Bam. One notable radio appearance was on December 26, 2005, where Margera gave Novak $500 to hire two sex workers as a Christmas gift. As Novak was having sex with the women live on air in the studio, SIRIUS Satellite Radio cut off the show. This was significant as it was the first time SIRIUS had ever censored a program before.

Also in 2005, Novak arrived on the red carpet at the 2005 MTV Video Music Awards wearing nothing except a computer keyboard. The night prior he had brought back girls to his hotel room and sometime in the night had thrown his clothes off the balcony. Having no clothes for the VMA's, he decided on a keyboard.

In 2008, Novak appeared in Bam Margera Presents: Where the#$&% Is Santa?, which featured Novak and several other cast members trying to find Santa Claus. That same year, Novak appeared in a pornographic film by Gina Lynn called The Fantasstic Whores 4 with Margera while Margera had a "prominent, non-sex role".

In 2010, Novak appeared in Jackass 3D in multiple scenes. Novak also had a more prominent role in the follow-up film Jackass 3.5, which was released in 2011.

In 2013 and 2014, Novak traveled around the world as the opening act for rock and roll band Fuckface Unstoppable. Performing as "Pill" Collins, a spoof of Phil Collins, he would sing "In The Air Tonight" to open the shows. He would be heavily intoxicated, known for coming out naked and spraying the crowd with wine.

He has also been featured on Howard Stern's Most Outrageous Moments for his appearance in a 2008 episode where he stripped naked and licked Richard Christy's anus for $280.

=== Author of Dreamseller and The Streets of Baltimore ===
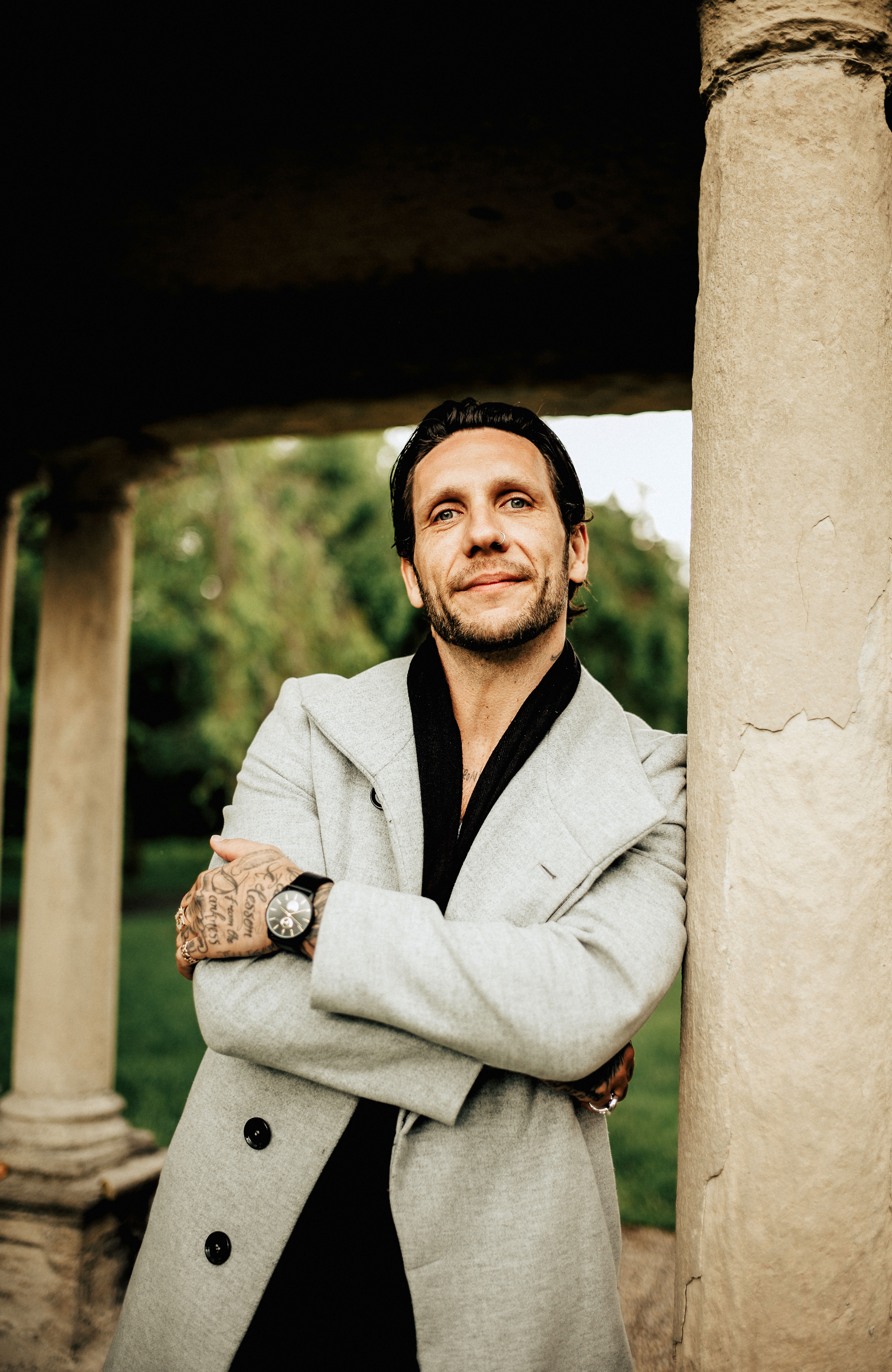
Novak in 2019

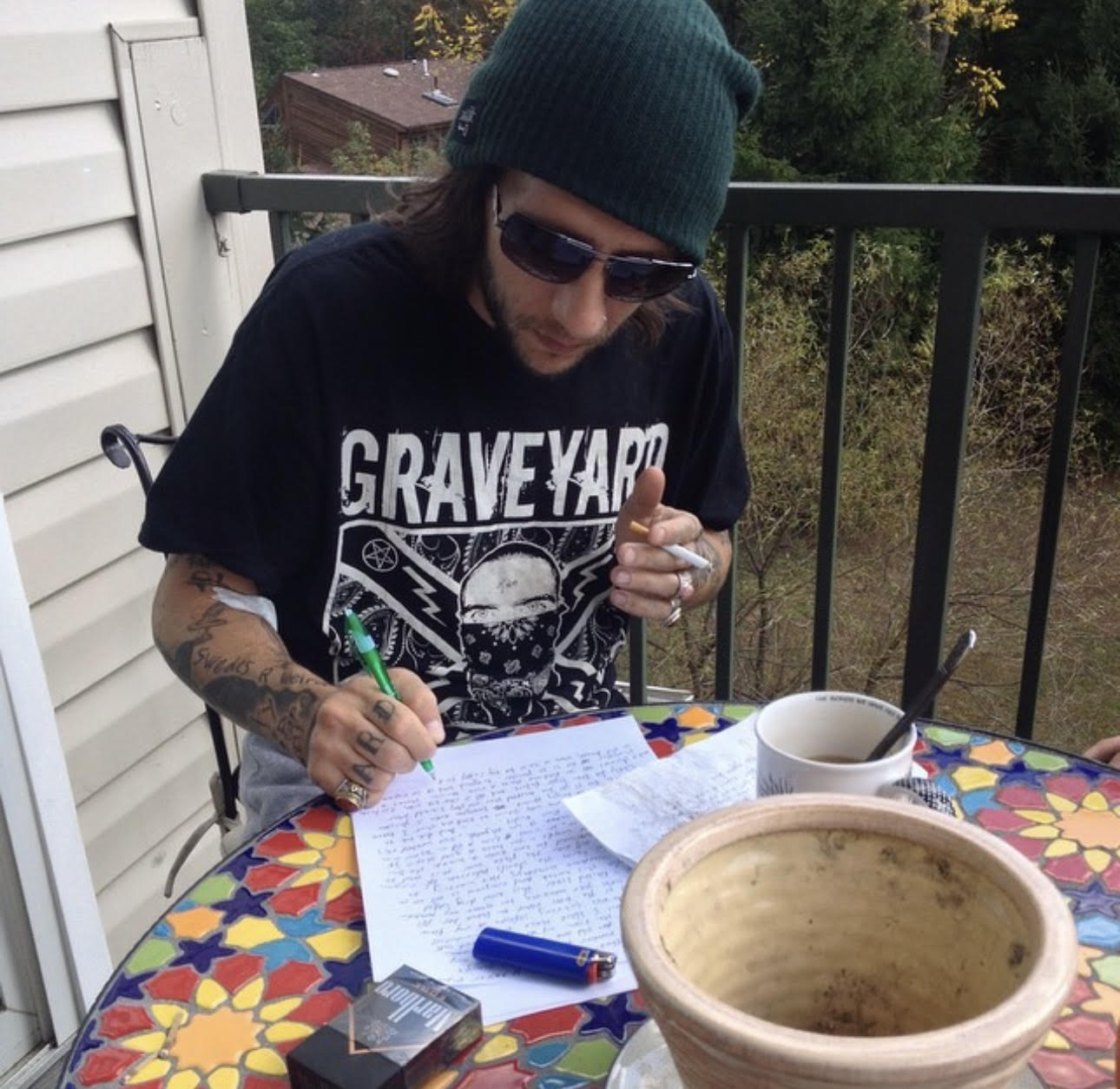
Novak writing the book in 2014 prior to his sobriety

Novak, along with co-author and CKY filmographer Joe Frantz, authored his first book, titled Dreamseller, which is based on his life and experiences with heroin in Baltimore. The book was published on October 18, 2008. A paperback version of the book was released exactly a year after its original publishing on October 18, 2009.

A movie, also to be titled Dreamseller, was supposed to be in production in early 2007, but was stopped when Novak began using heroin again. On the December 17, 2007 episode of Radio Bam, it was announced that the movie may be completed in the near future with Bam Margera starring as Novak in the film.

In 2015, the idea of a movie was again floated, but Novak claimed that to secure funding they would have to approve Justin Bieber playing Novak, which they felt wasn't the right direction. Production ceased again.

In 2018, Novak and Frantz released a graphic novel titled The Brandon Novak Chronicles: The Shocking True Addiction Stories of a Counter-Culture Icon.

Novak released a second book titled The Streets of Baltimore in 2020, marking the five-year anniversary of his sobriety, which chronicles more of his struggle with addiction.

== Battles with drug abuse ==
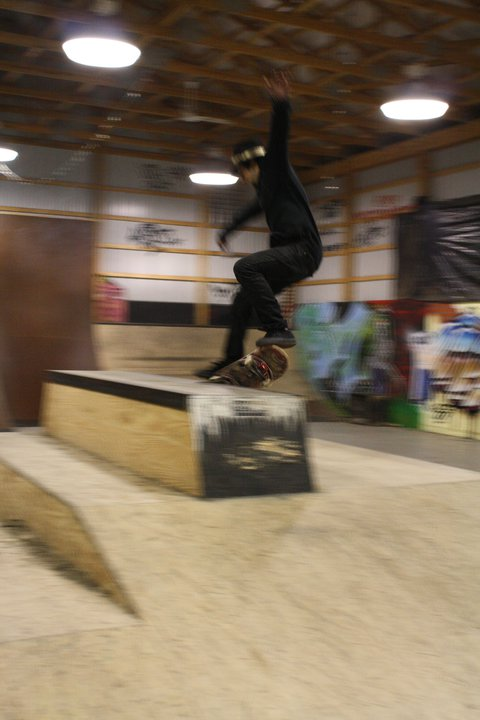
Novak skating at Bam Margera's skate park in 2010

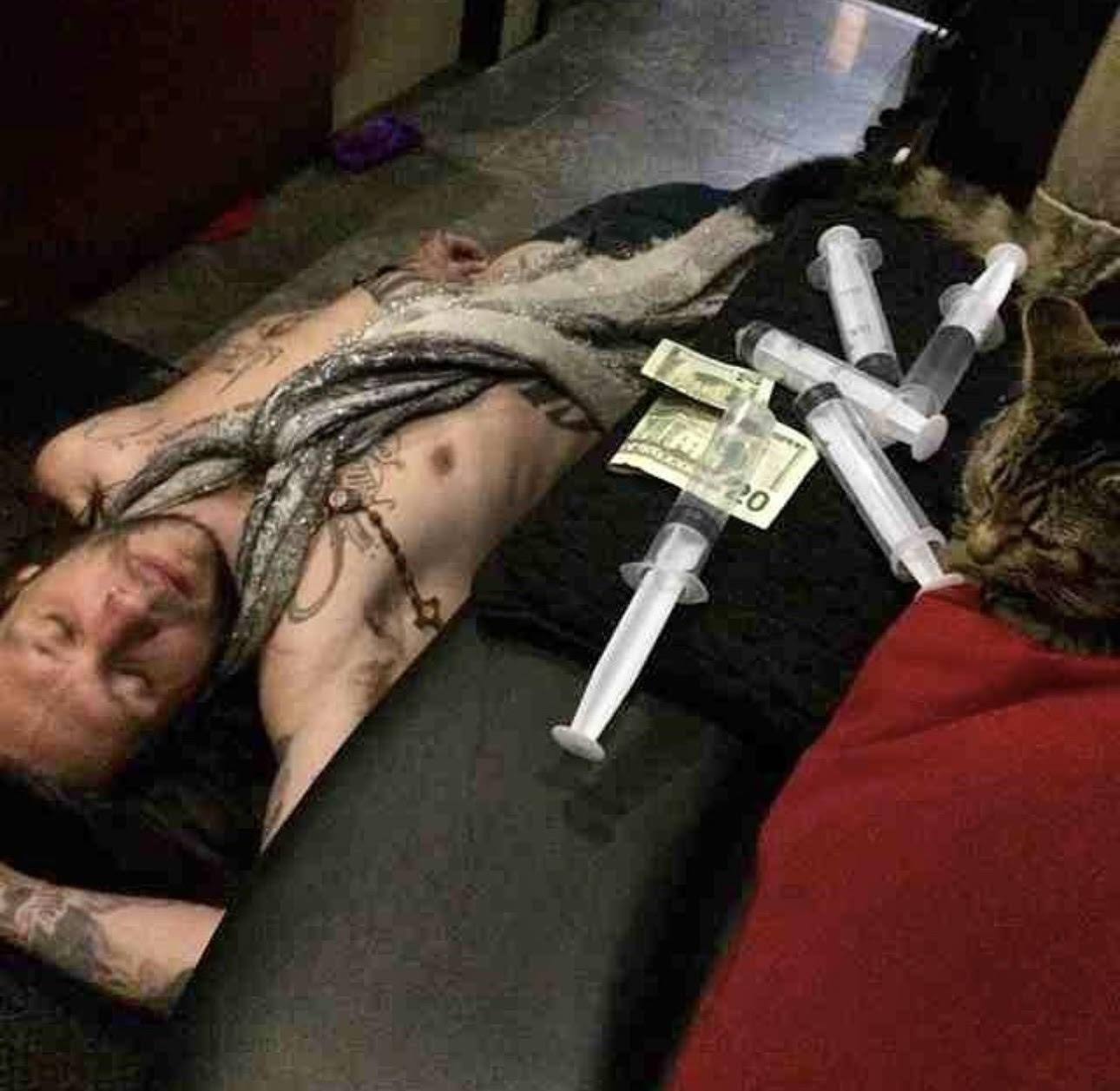
Novak under the influence

Before achieving sobriety in 2015, Novak struggled for over 20 years with addictions to heroin, cocaine, pain pills, benzodiazepines, and alcohol. He spent his 19th, 20th, 22nd, 23rd, 24th, 25th, 27th, 28th, 29th, 32nd, 33rd, 34th, and 35th birthdays in a jail or treatment center.

When Novak was 14, he was a professional skateboarder on the Powell Peralta Team, traveling the country with Bucky Lasek, Tony Hawk, and others. Despite his meteoric rise to success, his drug use was discovered by Mike Vallely and Todd Hastings, team manager at the time, presented him with the unanimous choice for him to either leave the team or attend rehab for his "psychoactive substance abuse"; he elected to leave the team. Over the next 20 years, he went to rehab 13 times, was frequently arrested, overdosed over four times, stole from his friends and family, and prostituted himself to pay for drugs.

Novak was clean for almost four years, from 2003 to 2007, before relapsing.

Novak was absent from the January 23, 2006 episode of Radio Bam on Sirius Satellite Radio while he attended rehab for addiction to pills. On February 26, 2007, Novak admitted on Radio Bam that while he had quit using heroin, he still regularly abused cocaine and pain medication and frequently drank alcohol. While it was not mentioned on the radio show, Novak broke both ankles the day before Margera's wedding while skating with Tony Hawk and Margera during filming for Bam's Unholy Union on February 2, 2007. He was shown holding a bottle of prescription pain killers afterwards. Margera stated on Radio Bam that Novak relapsed in March 2007 and was seeking treatment in a rehabilitation clinic. It is unclear if this incident led to his relapse, or if the relapse was already occurring by this time.

Margera announced on the April 3, 2007 episode of Radio Bam that Novak had a relapse with his addiction to heroin and was back in rehab. On the July 30, 2007 episode of Radio Bam, Margera and Chad I Ginsburg were discussing the topic of heroin and announced that Novak's addiction was "the worst [Bam] had ever seen" and that Novak was "just killing himself now". He was kicked out of rehab in Scranton, Pennsylvania, after heroin pills were found in his bag. Novak claimed that the pills were "planted" on him. On a Radio Bam episode in November, Novak stated that he had attempted suicide three weeks before the radio show, as a result of a heroin binge, but survived it.

On the December 17, 2007 episode of Radio Bam, Novak was asked to leave Margera's house again when he lied on air about not having pills and being clean. He had recently been released from a psychiatric ward he had been held in for 12 days because of suicidal tendencies and drug use. The crew found multiple bars of Xanax on Novak, which he claimed had been prescribed to him. Joe Frantz and Margera exiled Novak for a period of time as a result. On the March 3, 2008 episode of Radio Bam, Novak stated that he was 33 days clean and would appear in Bam's new MTV show.

In March 2009, Frantz had a phone conversation with Novak about his attempted suicide and mental health issues that resulted in him being institutionalized. On March 9, 2009, Novak appeared on Radio Bam and discussed getting out of the mental institution, his drug use, and the delusions that led to the problems.

=== Influence ===
Novak and his battles with addiction influenced a number of songs.

In a 2006 episode of Loveline with Dr. Drew, lead vocalist of HIM, Ville Valo confirmed their song "Killing Loneliness" was inspired by Novak who blamed his heroin addiction on a need to, "kill the loneliness."

Bam Margera's band Fuckface Unstoppable produced two songs heavily featuring Novak. "Moonshine", where in the chorus Margera sings about Novak and the music video begins with a naked Novak throwing a fit outside of a gas station.

In 2013, Margera also developed the song "Till the Wheels Fal Alf". The music video opens with Novak intoxicated on the phone and ends with a naked Novak being dragged out of a building. The song contains lyrics alluding to Novak's addiction to pills.

In 2017, the band Black Haze released a song titled "Dreamseller", as an ode to Novak's nickname. The music video contains videos of Novak pre-sobriety.

In April 2023, Brandon Novak became affiliated with Redemption Addiction Treatment Center, located in Wilmington, Delaware. He actively answers incoming calls and helps those that struggle with substance use disorder.

=== Arrests and jail sentence ===
Prior to achieving sobriety, Novak had a long history in and out of the legal system. Novak has been charged over 30 times with charges ranging from burglary to possession over the course of 1997–2014.

In a 2008 interview, Bam Margera details how Novak was featured on World's Dumbest Criminals following a humorous arrest where Novak breaks into a gas station during a blizzard, leaves with the stolen goods, then realizing he has nowhere to go, decides to return to the gas station and sleep. He awakes to the police questioning him.

On July 7, 2010, Novak was arrested at Chester County Hospital for an outstanding warrant after being admitted to the hospital for breaking several bones filming a scene for Jackass 3D. He was charged with forging a prescription after he tried to pass a fake prescription for Xanax at a Walgreens in Media, Pennsylvania.

On November 3, 2010, Novak was sentenced to 11–23 months. His initial sentence called for the first 30 weeks, to be spent as weekend confinement at the George W. Hill Correctional Facility in Thornton, Pennsylvania. After his weekends were completed, Novak would spend six months on house arrest until eligible for release.

In early February 2011, Novak claimed on Radio Bam that he had used his cellmate's urine to pass a drug test and mentioned the facility by name. The episode was intercepted by the staff at the correctional facility, and on February 11, 2011, the judge revoked Novak's weekend sentence and ordered him to be jailed for 10 months. Novak was released from the jail on December 30, 2011. He was then on parole for one year and was on probation until the end of 2013, during which time he had to stay clean of illegal substances.

=== Feud with Bam Margera ===
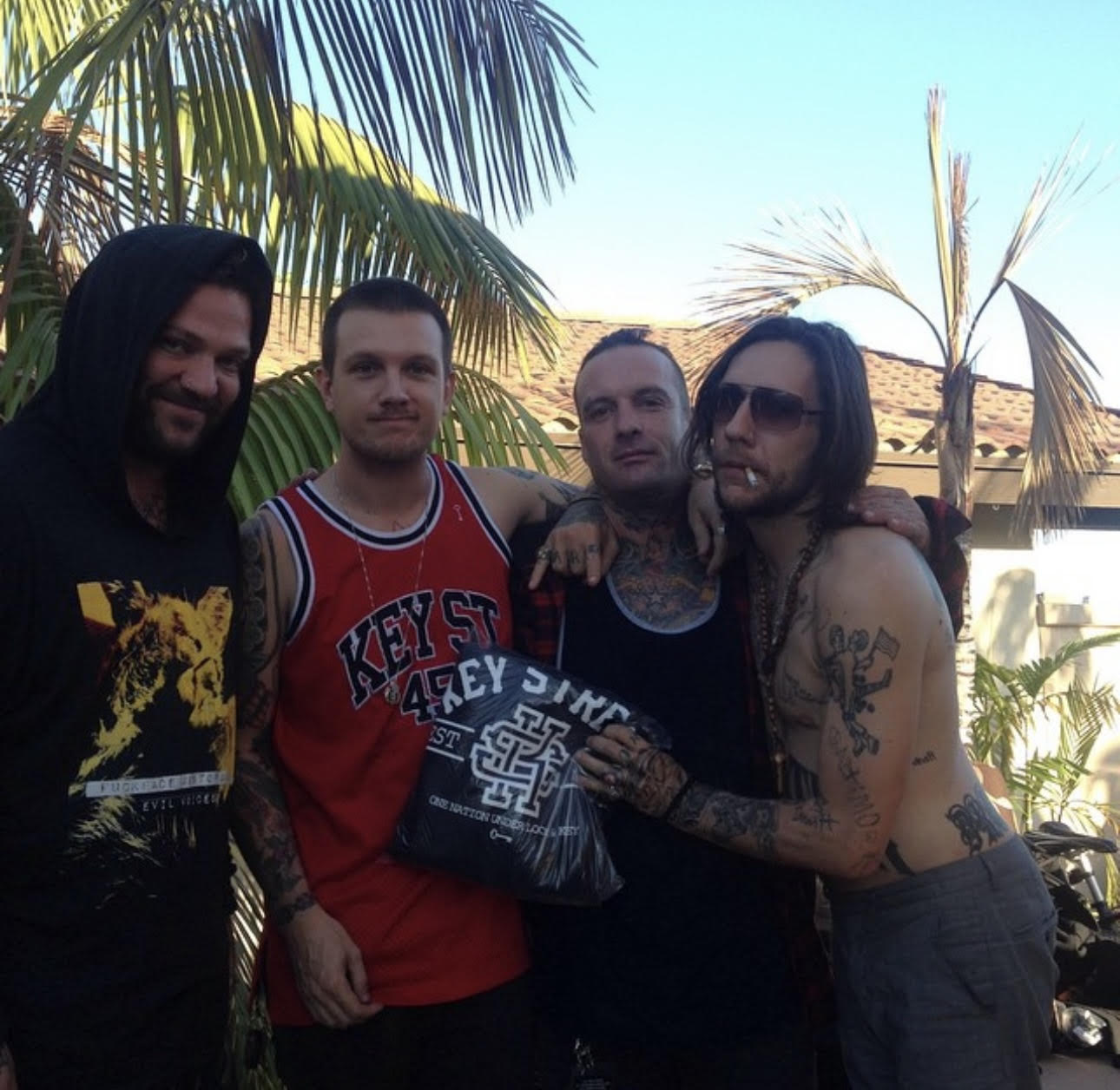
Bam Margera (left) and Novak (right) in 2014

A feud between Novak and childhood best friend Bam Margera began in 2019 as a result of Margera's continued substance abuse problems. Margera has routinely taken to Instagram to attack Novak. In early 2021, Margera shared a series of text messages between himself and Novak with him saying to Novak, "Your [sic] not signing a book on my turf till you admit who you are. You can't just keep coming around my way. Dont [sic] you reply to your best friend?" He additionally went on Instagram Live while intoxicated, claiming his best friend and "life partner" Brandon Novak promised him a new car and Margera felt betrayed by him. In further posts, alluding to the financial support he provided Novak for rehab attempts, he says, "If you fucking faggots don't think I fixed Novak then tell that to the 150,000.00 I have spent on fixing him! Fuckers."

In a 2019 interview, Novak addresses the personal attacks from Margera, "You see Bam's public tirades and the fact that he focused a lot of his attention and his anger on me for a little while.. Did it hurt? Absolutely. Was I angry? Absolutely. Did I retaliate? Definitely not. The reality is why me, why me, it's like why the fuck not me? As many times as I hurt him, I took advantage of him, I lied to him, I stole from him, he always lent a hand. And now what better person to understand where he's at than me? There's nothing he could say that would offend me or make me abandon our friendship. I won't and I'll see this through with him till the very end, good, bad, or indifferent."

== Sobriety ==
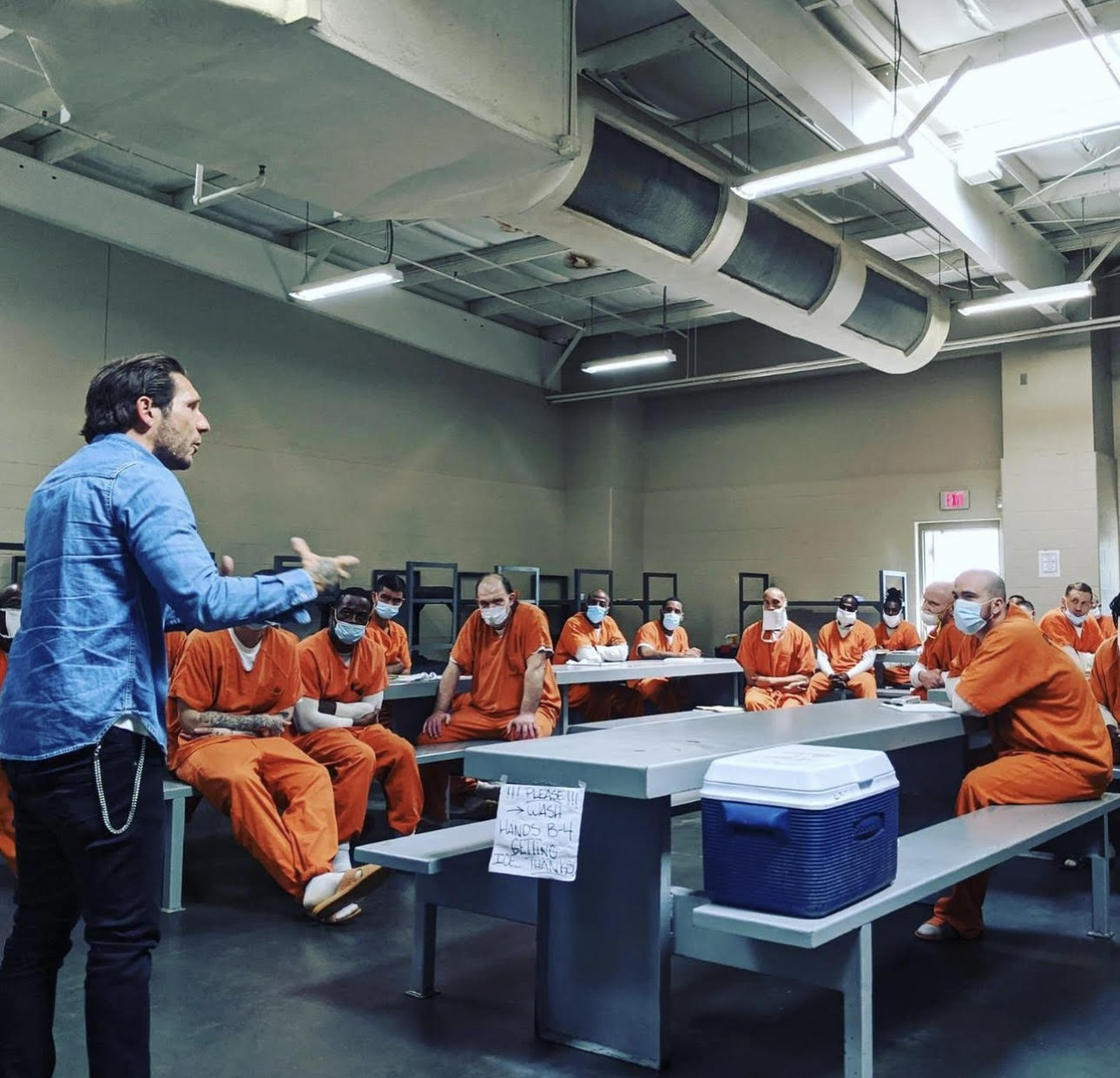
Novak speaking at a prison in 2021

After a string of relapses and homelessness, Novak entered Today, Inc. in Langhorne, Pennsylvania and successfully completed treatment. He has been clean and sober since May 25, 2015. He now serves as a Certified Intervention Professional and serves as a motivational speaker.

Novak tours the nation sharing his story of recovery and message of hope, seeking to help suffering addicts. He has appeared on broadcasts nationally. In all media appearances he encourages anyone who is struggling to reach out to him for help directly. He even provides his personal cellphone number to audiences for anyone who needs help.

Novak serves as the keynote speaker for the DEA's Youth Summit events, bringing drug awareness and education to high schools and organizations across the nation.

He starred in "Facing Addiction in America", a television special featuring celebrities who had been affected by addiction. The special was aired on BET, Comedy Central, CMT, Logo TV, MTV, MTV2, MTV Classic, MTV Live, Spike TV, TV Land, and VH1.

TENGA Productions produced a video with Novak telling his story that went viral on YouTube. It was shown in more than 40 US markets and garnered more than 4.5 million views inspiring countless individuals to reach out for help.

=== Novak's House ===
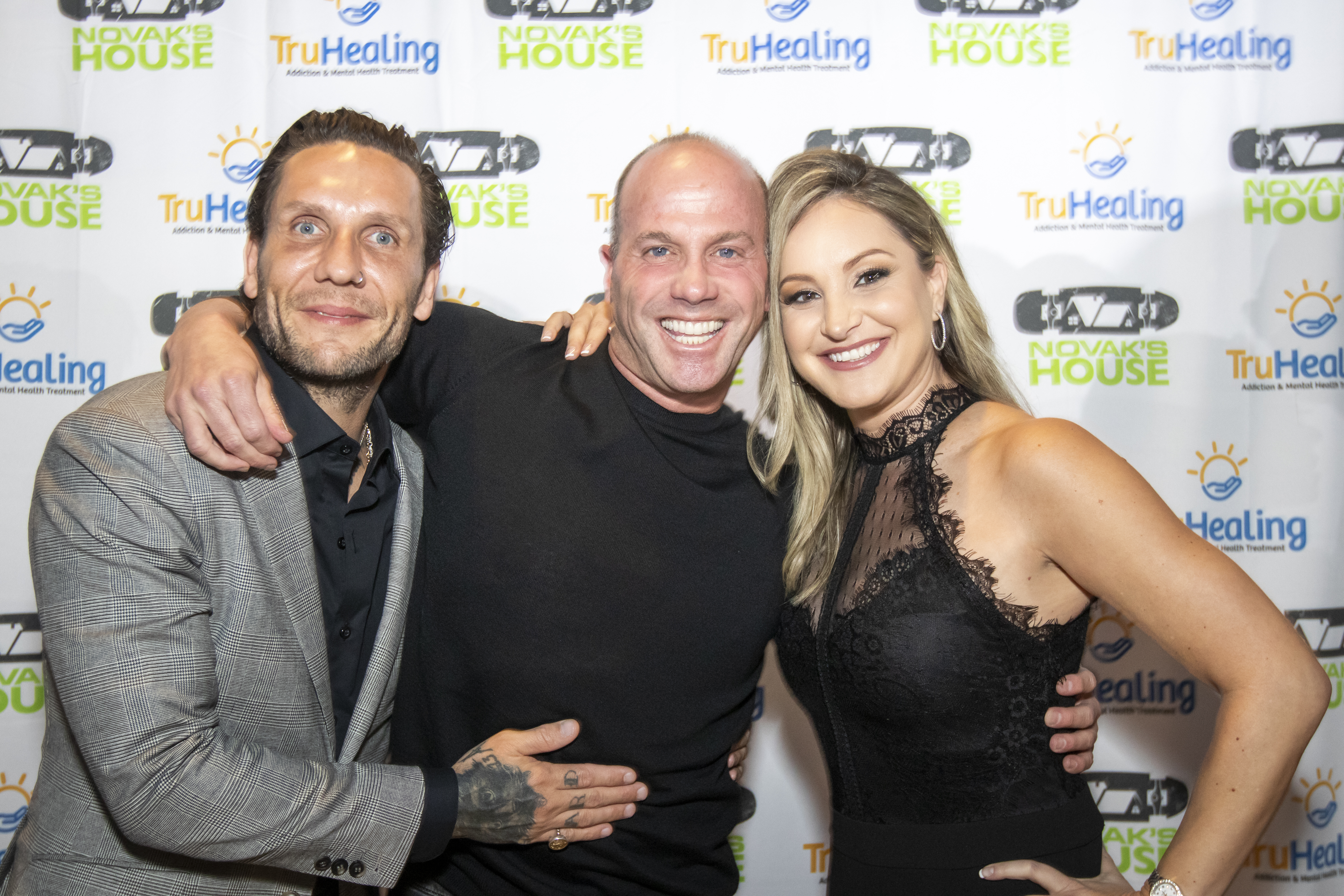
Novak (left) with Darren Prince and Allison Rush at the first Novak's House event in Boca Raton, Florida, in 2022

Novak, alongside George Evagelou, founded Novak's House, a sober home in Delaware for young men in recovery. As of 2022, there are three Novak's Houses located in Wilmington, Delaware.

In February 2022, Novak, alongside manager Allison Rush and Julie Johnson, held the first-ever Novak's House gala in Boca Raton, Florida to raise money for sober living scholarships. The event raised nearly $70,000 and was featured on WPTV-TV, Yahoo! Sports, and ESPN.

Also in 2022, Novak and Johnson partnered with the Mountain Dew Skate Tour and Punk Rock and Paintbrushes to sponsor an art show and also raise money for Novak's House scholarships through a VIP event. Brandon and Julie continued their support for Punk Rock and Paintbrushes artists and scholarships by sponsoring a show at Tony Hawk's Weekend Jam in May 2022.

== Filmography ==
=== Movies ===
Year	Title	Role	Notes
2001	CKY3	Himself	Direct-to-video
2002	CKY4: The Latest & Greatest	Himself	Direct-to-video
2003	Haggard: The Movie	Dooli	
2006	Jackass Number Two	Himself	Guest appearances
2007	Jackass 2.5	Himself	Guest appearances
2008	Bam Margera Presents: Where the#$&% Is Santa?	Himself	Direct-to-video
2008	The Fantasstic Whores 4	Himself	
2009	Dreamseller: The Brandon Novak Documentary	Himself	Short documentary
2009	Minghags	Gay biker	
2010	Jackass 3D	Himself	Guest appearances
2011	Jackass 3.5	Himself	Guest appearances
2017	The Fast Food King	Himself	Documentary
2020	Steve-O: Gnarly	Himself	Direct-to-video; Guest appearances
2022	Humanity Stoked	Himself	Documentary
TBA	The Brandon Novak Story	Himself	Documentary

=== Television ===
Year	Title	Role	Notes
2004–2006	Viva La Bam	Himself	18 episodes
2005	MTV Cribs	Himself	1 episode
2005	2005 MTV Video Music Awards	Himself	Guest appearance
2007	Bam's Unholy Union	Himself	9 episodes
2008	truTV Presents: World's Dumbest...	Himself	1 episode
2009	The Dudesons	Himself	Episode 3.6
2009	Nitro Circus	Himself	2 episodes
2011	A Tribute to Ryan Dunn	Himself	TV documentary Archive footage
2014	Bam's Bad Ass Game Show	Himself	6 episodes
2014	CKY: The Greatest Hits	Himself	TV special
2017	Epicly Later'd: Bam Margera	Himself	TV documentary
2018	WGN Morning News	Himself	1 episode
2021	FOX 29 Philadelphia	Himself	1 episode

=== Web series ===
Year	Title	Role	Notes
2018	Bathroom Break Podcast	Himself	2 episodes
2021–2024	Steve-O's Wild Ride	Himself	Podcast; 3 episodes

== Bibliography ==
- Brandon Novak, Dreamseller. (Citadel Press, 2008) (hardcover) ISBN 0-8065-3003-0
- Brandon Novak, Dreamseller. (Citadel Press, 2009) (paperback)
- Brandon Novak, The Streets of Baltimore. (Frantz Press, 2020) (paperback) ISBN 0578602768
