= Camp Kill Yourself =

Camp Kill Yourself may refer to:

- CKY (band), a rock band from Pennsylvania, United States
- CKY (video series), a series of videos starring Bam Margera
- CKY crew, a group of friends and relatives centered around Bam Margera
