= CKY crew =

Group centered around Bam Margera

The Camp Kill Yourself crew (referred to as the CKY crew) was a group of friends and relatives centered on television personality and skateboarder Bam Margera, many of whom are from or located in and around West Chester, Pennsylvania. The crew was active from Landspeed presents: CKY (1999) to Minghags: The Movie (2009). Some members of the crew were skateboarders, while others were involved either on-camera or behind-the-scenes in Margera's various projects such as the CKY videos, Jackass, Viva La Bam, Haggard: The Movie, Bam's Unholy Union, Minghags: The Movie, and Radio Bam.

The CKY crew was closely linked to the band CKY, which features Bam's brother Jess Margera on drums. Music by the band was often featured in video projects that members of the crew were involved with.

== Main crew ==
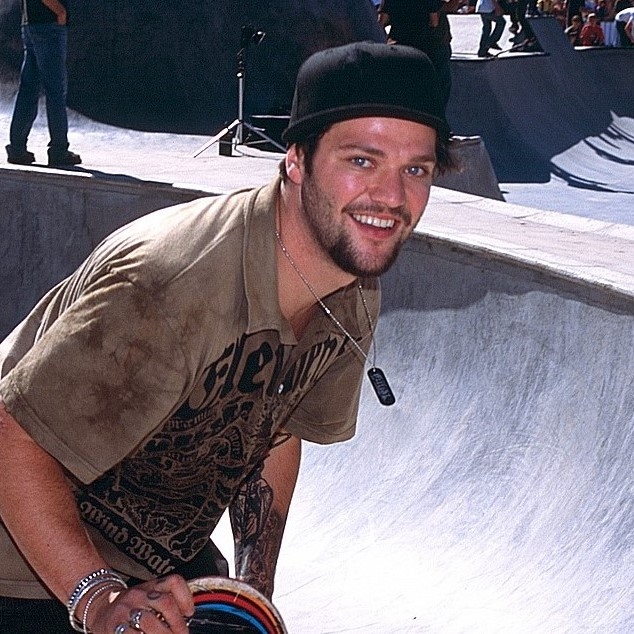
Bam Margera in 2006

- Bam Margera – Former professional skateboarder for Element Skateboarding. Starred in hit movie series Jackass and his own reality TV shows Viva La Bam and Bam's Unholy Union. Has since struggled with drug and alcohol abuse and has been in and out of rehab.
- Ryan Dunn – Was part of both the CKY and Jackass crews. He and Margera participated in the Gumball 3000 three times in the years 2005, 2006 and 2008. Dunn also starred in Margera's directorial debut, Haggard: The Movie. Dunn died in a drunk-driving incident in 2011.
- Brandon DiCamillo – Was responsible for the shopping carts skit and wrote all the skits and stunts with Margera while making the CKY videos. DiCamillo was known for playing various characters in movies and in the CKY videos. He was one of the groomsmen at Margera's wedding. After 2009's Minghags, DiCamillo has not appeared in any CKY related project. It is believed he decided to move out of the public eye. This was confirmed by Joe Frantz in 2017, stating that DiCamillo formally renounced his affiliation with the CKY crew years prior in order to live a more private life with his wife and children.
- Raab Himself (real name Chris Raab) – Appeared in all of the CKY videos. Raab left the crew shortly after the filming of Viva La Bam in 2005 after having a dispute with Margera for unknown reasons. This was later cleared up by Raab, stating the reason he left was to live a more sober lifestyle. He released his movie Hotdog Casserole in 2008. Raab made his most recent appearance in MTV's CKY: The Greatest Hits alongside the other main CKY crew members in 2014. Raab is the only CKY crew member involved in Jackass Forever and Jackass 4.5, which were both released in 2022. He was a camera operator for both films and had a brief appearance in Jackass Forever.
- Rake Yohn (real name Edward Webb) – Known for his long hair, love for heavy metal music, and strong dislike of mustard. He is a chemist after receiving his BS at Penn State. Alongside DiCamillo, he co-hosted the show Blastazoid. They also both appear in Raab's movies Hotdog Casserole and Borrowed Happiness.
- Jess Margera – Bam's elder brother. He plays drums for CKY, Gnarkill, Viking Skull, and The Company Band. Jess was Bam's best man at his wedding.

== The Margeras ==
- April Margera – Bam's mother
- Phil Margera – Bam's father
- Don Vito (real name Vincent Margera) – Bam's uncle. He died of liver and kidney failure in 2015.
- Ruthie Margera a.k.a. "Boof" – Bam's aunt and Phil's sister. Appeared in Viva La Bam and Minghags: The Movie. She died in 2021.
- Darlene Margera a.k.a. "Mum-Mum" or "Mom-Mom" – She is Phil and Vincent's mother, April's mother-in-law and the grandmother of Jess and Bam Margera. She made a few appearances on Viva La Bam, Bam's Unholy Union, and in the CKY videos. She died in 2007.
- Phillip Margera Sr. a.k.a. "Pop-Pop" – The father of Phil Margera and Don Vito. Appeared in Viva La Bam, Bam's Unholy Union, Haggard: The Movie, and Minghags: The Movie. He is credited for giving Brandon Margera the "Bam" nickname. He died in 2021.

== Others ==
- Chris Aspite a.k.a. Hoofbité – He is a professional skateboarder. He co-wrote Haggard: The Movie along with Bam and Brandon DiCamillo. He attended the University of Pittsburgh.
- Dave Battaro a.k.a. Lord Battaro – He and Brandon DiCamillo roomed together before. He played the "Mustard Man" in CKY4.
- Matt Cole a.k.a. "Shitbirdz" – Bam's maternal uncle. Cole plays guitar for Gnarkill. He has appeared in Bam's Unholy Union and was a regular on Radio Bam. He was one of the groomsmen in Bam's wedding. He also appeared in Bam Margera Presents: Where the#$&% Is Santa?, and briefly toured with CKY as a keyboardist.
- Dave Decurtis a.k.a. Naked Dave. – He appears naked in Margera's works (hence the nickname). A stunt of him running naked in front of a van was featured on Jackass and originally appeared on CKY. He usually has clothes on only when not filming.
- Jason Ellis – Pro-skater. He has appeared in Viva La Bam and Haggard: The Movie. He had a show on SpikeTV called The Wild World of Spike. He is currently the host of the Jason Ellis Show.
- Joe Frantz – Under Bam's direction, Frantz has served multiple roles as producer and director of photography on the independent films Haggard and Minghags, the CKY video series (CKY3 and CKY4), and music videos for HIM, CKY, and The 69 Eyes (as well as other popular bands). Frantz is also one of the cameramen behind Jackass Number Two, Jackass 2.5, Jackass 3D and Jackass 3.5. He was also in the show Blastazoid with Rake Yohn and Brandon DiCamillo. Frantz is known for the on-screen appearances he has made in the works he produces, in television shows and films such as Viva La Bam, Bam's Unholy Union, the CKY video series, and Bam Margera Presents: Where the#$&% Is Santa?. He also is a collaborative co-author of the book Dreamseller, which he wrote with MTV/Jackass personality Brandon Novak.
- Ryan Gee a.k.a. "Shitgoose" and "The Gill" – He is a professional photographer who works with Bam on many of his projects including the behind-the-scenes footage for Minghags.
- Kerry Getz a.k.a. "Hockey Temper" – Pro-skater known for his tantrums while skateboarding, which is why he is nicknamed "Hockey Temper" in the first CKY video.
- Chad I Ginsburg – CKY's guitarist. He was one of the groomsmen at Bam's wedding. Operates the soundboard on Radio Bam. He also appeared in Bam's Unholy Union and Where the #$&% is Santa?.
- Chris and Mark Hanna – Brothers. Chris is involved with Bam's work and managed CKY on the Viva La Bands tour. They both used to be neighbors with the Margeras. Mark was good friends with Bam and appears in CKY 3, the CKY Documentary, Haggard: The Movie, Viva La Bam, Minghags and Where the #$&% is Santa?. Mark has also been a drum tech for CKY on various tours.
- Tony Hawk a.k.a. "Birdman" – Professional skateboarding legend. Has made several appearances on Viva La Bam.
- Terry Kennedy a.k.a. "Compton Ass Terry" – Professional skateboarder. He appeared on Viva La Bam and appeared in Minghags.
- Mike Maldonado – Professional skater who has appeared in the CKY videos.
- Deron Miller – Ex-CKY singer / guitarist. Has appeared off and on in Bam's projects. He is married to Felissa Rose, star of the horror movie Sleepaway Camp, which CKY used a screenshot from for the album artwork of their Disengage the Simulator EP and other merchandise. They have three children together.
- Tim Glomb – A skilled carpenter and construction worker with a knack for skateboard park building. He made several appearances in the first few seasons of Viva La Bam and towards the end had become a regular. During Viva La Bam, in the first episode, he built skateboarding ramps all over the interior and exterior of Bam's house. He is credited on Where the #$&% is Santa? for helping with the story. He now splits his time between Denver, Colorado and Pennsylvania.
- Brandon Novak – Former pro-skater & Bam's childhood friend. Appeared in Haggard as a drug dealer while battling his own addictions. The documentary for Haggard ended up being about him and Ryan Dunn confronting him about it. He was a regular on Bam's Unholy Union and was one of Bam's groomsmen. He had small roles in Bam's other projects as well, including Jackass and Minghags.
- Tim O'Connor – He has appeared in many episodes of Viva La Bam. He has also appeared in the CKY videos. Tim was a "MADE" coach on MTV's Made.
- Mike Vallely a.k.a. "Mike V" – Professional skateboarder. He appeared in several CKY movies and Viva La Bam episodes.
- Jenn Rivell – Bam's longtime girlfriend. She appeared in all CKY videos and first three seasons of Viva la Bam. After they broke up in 2005, she broke into Castle Bam and smashed all of his computers and editing equipment.
- Art Webb – Rake Yohn's brother. He is credited as "Art Webb 1986" because of his love for music in that particular year. Art's longest known speaking part comes in an unscripted tirade in the documentary in the Haggard: The Movie bonus features when he professes his willingness to act as Tony Hawk's bodyguard. He now runs a podcast called "Gamecasa". Art also played a speaking role in the video game Trials 2 along with Brandon DiCamillo and Rake Yohn.
- Vernon Zaborowski – Former bassist for CKY. He was featured briefly in the CKY video series. Vern briefly reunited with the band to perform one song at the San Jose stop of Warped Tour 2017.

== Reunions ==
In 2011, a few members of the crew briefly reunited for MTV's tribute to the late Ryan Dunn. Bam Margera, Jess Margera, Rake Yohn, and Chris Raab were all featured in the special.

On November 2, 2014, MTV aired a special called CKY: The Greatest Hits. It featured new interviews with Bam Margera, Jess Margera, Rake Yohn, Chris Raab, April Margera, Phil Margera, Dave Battaro and Joe Frantz. With special appearances from Johnny Knoxville, Jeff Tremaine, Kerry Getz and Tim O'Connor. The special also featured unreleased footage documenting the series as a whole. It was directed by longtime CKY crew member and cinematographer Joe Frantz.

In 2018, Chris Raab featured many of the crew members on his "Bathroom Break" podcast. Guests included: Brandon Novak, Joe Frantz, Bam Margera, Rake Yohn, Deron Miller, April Margera, Phil Margera, Jess Margera, Dave Battaro and Vernon Zaborowski. Brandon DiCamillo reportedly declined to appear.

== Filmography ==
=== Films ===
Year	Film	Main members involved
1999	Landspeed presents: CKY	Bam Margera, Ryan Dunn, Brandon DiCamillo, Chris Raab, Rake Yohn, Jess Margera
2000	CKY2K	Bam Margera, Ryan Dunn, Brandon DiCamillo, Chris Raab, Rake Yohn, Jess Margera
2001	CKY3	Bam Margera, Ryan Dunn, Brandon DiCamillo, Chris Raab, Rake Yohn, Jess Margera
2001	CKY Documentary	Bam Margera, Ryan Dunn, Brandon DiCamillo, Chris Raab, Rake Yohn, Jess Margera
2002	CKY4: The Latest & Greatest	Bam Margera, Ryan Dunn, Brandon DiCamillo, Chris Raab, Rake Yohn, Jess Margera
2002	Jackass: The Movie	Bam Margera, Ryan Dunn, Brandon DiCamillo, Chris Raab, Rake Yohn, Jess Margera
2003	Haggard: The Movie	Bam Margera, Ryan Dunn, Brandon DiCamillo, Chris Raab, Rake Yohn, Jess Margera
2005	A Halfway House Christmas	Ryan Dunn, Rake Yohn
2006	The Dudesons Movie	Bam Margera, Ryan Dunn, Chris Raab, Rake Yohn
2006	Jackass Number Two	Bam Margera, Ryan Dunn, Brandon DiCamillo (cameo), Jess Margera (cameo)
2007	Dunn & Vito's Rock Tour	Ryan Dunn, Brandon DiCamillo
2007	3000 Miles	Bam Margera, Ryan Dunn
2007	Jackass 2.5	Bam Margera, Ryan Dunn, Brandon DiCamillo, Rake Yohn, Jess Margera
2008	Hotdog Casserole	Chris Raab, Brandon DiCamillo, Rake Yohn
2008	Bam Margera Presents: Where the #$&% Is Santa?	Bam Margera, Jess Margera
2009	Minghags: The Movie	Bam Margera, Ryan Dunn, Brandon DiCamillo, Rake Yohn, Jess Margera
2010	Jackass 3D	Bam Margera, Ryan Dunn, Rake Yohn (cameo), Jess Margera (cameo)
2011	Jackass 3.5	Bam Margera, Ryan Dunn, Rake Yohn (cameo), Jess Margera (cameo)
2012	Cattle Bag	Brandon DiCamillo, Rake Yohn
2013	Jackass Presents: Bad Grandpa	Chris Raab (production assistant)
2014	Jackass Presents: Bad Grandpa .5	Chris Raab (production assistant)
2014	Borrowed Happiness	Chris Raab, Brandon DiCamillo, Rake Yohn, Jess Margera (musician)
2020	Steve-O: Gnarly	Bam Margera, Ryan Dunn (archive footage)
2022	Jackass Forever	Chris Raab (cameo and cameraman), Bam Margera (cameo), Ryan Dunn (archive footage), Brandon DiCamillo (archive footage), Rake Yohn (archive footage)
2022	Jackass 4.5	Chris Raab (cameraman), Ryan Dunn (archive footage)
2026	Jackass: Best and Last	Bam Margera (archive footage), Ryan Dunn (archive footage), Brandon DiCamillo (archival footage), Chris Raab (archival footage), Rake Yohn (archival footage)

=== Television ===
Year	Title	Main members involved
2000–2001	Jackass	Bam Margera, Ryan Dunn, Brandon DiCamillo, Chris Raab, Rake Yohn, Jess Margera
2002	Jackass Backyard BBQ	Bam Margera, Ryan Dunn, Brandon DiCamillo (archived footage)
2003	Jackass Winterjam Special	Bam Margera, Ryan Dunn
2003–2006	Viva La Bam	Bam Margera, Ryan Dunn, Brandon DiCamillo, Chris Raab, Rake Yohn, Jess Margera
2005	Commando VIP	Ryan Dunn
2005	Homewrecker	Ryan Dunn
2006	The Dudesons (season 1)	Bam Margera, Ryan Dunn, Chris Raab, Rake Yohn
2006	Blastazoid	Brandon DiCamillo, Rake Yohn
2007	Bam's Unholy Union	Bam Margera, Brandon DiCamillo, Rake Yohn, Jess Margera, Ryan Dunn (3 episodes)
2008	Jackassworld.com: 24 Hour Takeover	Bam Margera, Jess Margera, Ryan Dunn (archived footage), Brandon DiCamillo (archived footage)
2008	Bamimation	Bam Margera, Brandon DiCamillo, Ryan Dunn, Rake Yohn
2009	The Dudesons (season 3)	Bam Margera
2010	The Dudesons in America	Bam Margera, Ryan Dunn
2010	Bam's World Domination	Bam Margera, Ryan Dunn
2011	Proving Ground	Ryan Dunn
2011	A Tribute to Ryan Dunn	Bam Margera, Rake Yohn, Chris Raab, Jess Margera, Ryan Dunn (archived footage), Brandon DiCamillo (archived footage)
2014	Bam's Bad Ass Game Show	Bam Margera
2014	CKY: The Greatest Hits	Bam Margera, Rake Yohn, Chris Raab, Jess Margera, Ryan Dunn (archived footage), Brandon DiCamillo (archived footage)
2017	Epicly Later'd: Bam Margera	Bam Margera, Chris Raab, Ryan Dunn (archived footage), Brandon DiCamillo (archived footage), Rake Yohn (archived footage), Jess Margera (archived footage)
