= Rake Yohn =

American television personality (born 1975)

- Born: Edward Webb; January 20, 1975 (age 51); Bryn Mawr, Pennsylvania, U.S.
- Education: Pennsylvania State University
- Occupation: Television personality
- Years active: 1999–present
- Known for: Cast member of Viva La Bam
- Spouse: Melissa Carr (died 2023)
- Children: 2

Edward Webb (born January 20, 1975), known by his stage name Rake Yohn (/jɒn/), is an American television personality and former member of the CKY crew. He was a regular in the CKY videos and MTV's reality comedy series Viva La Bam and also had occasional appearances in Jackass.

== Biography ==
Yohn was born Edward Webb in Bryn Mawr, Pennsylvania, to Australian parents. He attended Penn State University and works as a chemist specializing in synthetic materials.

In 2009, Yohn, his brother Art Webb, and Brandon DiCamillo provided voice-overs for the Xbox Live Arcade game Trials HD.

Yohn and his wife Melissa had two children before she died on July 31, 2023 after a long-term illness.

== Filmography ==
Television

Year	Title	Role	Notes
2001	Jackass	Himself	3 episodes Guest appearances
2002	MTV Cribs	Himself	1 episode
2003-2006	Viva La Bam	Himself	43 episodes
2005	2005 MTV Video Music Awards	Himself	Guest appearance
2006	The Dudesons	Himself	1 episode Guest appearances
2006	Blastazoid	Himself	Producer
2007	Bam's Unholy Union	Himself	8 episodes
2008	Bamimation	Himself (voice)	TV short
2011	A Tribute to Ryan Dunn	Himself	TV documentary
2014	CKY: The Greatest Hits	Himself	TV special
2017	Epicly Later'd: Bam Margera	Himself	Archive footage TV documentary
2018	Drunk History: Germany	Himself	TV special

Film

Year	Title	Role	Notes
1999	Landspeed: CKY	Himself	Direct-to-video
2000	CKY2K	Himself	Direct-to-video
2001	CKY 3	Himself	Direct-to-video
2001	CKY Documentary	Himself	Direct-to-video documentary
2002	Criminal Mischief	Himself	Short film
2002	Jackass: The Movie	Himself	Guest appearance
2002	CKY4: The Latest & Greatest	Himself	Direct-to-video
2002	Don't Try This at Home: The Steve-O Video Vol. 2: The Tour	Himself	Cameo; Direct-to-video
2003	Haggard: The Movie	Hellboy	
2005	A Halfway House Christmas	Killer	
2006	The Dudesons Movie	Himself	Guest appearances
2007	Jackass 2.5	Himself	Guest appearances
2008	Hotdog Casserole	Lex Tanner	
2009	Minghags	Yohan	
2009	Jackass: The Lost Tapes	Himself	Archived footage
2010	Jackass 3D	Himself	Guest appearances
2011	Jackass 3.5	Himself	Guest appearances
2012	Cattle Bag	Various	
2014	Borrowed Happiness	Foursome guy	Cameo
2017	The Fast Food King	Himself	Documentary
2022	Jackass Forever	Himself	Archive footage
2026	Jackass: Best and Last	Himself	Archive footage
