= Minghags: The Movie =

Minghags
- Minghags poster
- Directed by: Bam Margera
- Written by: Bam Margera; Joe Frantz; Brandon DiCamillo
- Produced by: Mike Nutt; Sheldon "Dooner" Smith
- Starring: Bam Margera; Ryan Dunn; Brandon DiCamillo; Don Vito; Rake Yohn; Missy Rothstein; Brandon Novak; Mark the Bagger; Mark Hanna; Angie Cuturic
- Cinematography: Joe Frantz
- Edited by: Bam Margera; Joe Frantz
- Music by: Gnarkill
- Release date: 2009
- Running time: 96 minutes
- Country: United States
- Language: English
- Budget: $750,000

Minghags, previously known as Kiss a Good Man's Ass, is a 2009 film by Jackass star and professional skateboarder Bam Margera.

== Plot ==
Alleged human beings Lenny (Bam Margera) and Ponce (Brandon DiCamillo) have vowed revenge on billionaire scum-bag Rut Ru (DiCamillo) and on his bloated sidekick Dominick (Dave Battaro), who have heisted Ponce's invention, the Garbage Juicer. In desperation, they call on Tucker (Ryan Dunn). Meanwhile, campus nincompoop Ralph (Mark the Bagger) has flunked and found himself grounded for life by his father (Philip Margera Sr.) Featuring cameos by Jimmy Pop and "Evil" Jared Hasselhoff of the Bloodhound Gang, Don Vito, Rake Yohn, Compton Ass Terry, The Dudesons, Phil Margera, April Margera, Brandon Novak, Gina Lynn, Jess Margera, Chad I Ginsburg, Ryan Gee, and Joe Frantz.

== Cast ==
- Bam Margera as Lenny
- Ryan Dunn as Tucker
- Vincent Margera as Judge Vito
- Missy Margera as Nurse
- Brandon DiCamillo as Ponce, Rut Ru, and Scottie LaDousche
- Rake Yohn as Yohan
- Brandon Novak as Gay Biker
- Mark Hanna as Laughing Fanna
- Mark the Bagger as Ralph
- Angie Cuturic as Libby

== Background and delays ==
The project was announced in 2004 but has been pushed back by other projects including Viva La Bam, Jackass Number Two and Dreamseller. It has been confirmed that Minghags is a loose sequel to the 2003 film, Haggard. Minghags was set to be released on Valentine's Day 2008, but was delayed yet again by technical and legal issues.

A piece on UGO.com listed the movie to be a Warner Bros. release and was to start production in March 2005.

"Scene 2: Bam's finished his first screenplay for Warner Bros., Kiss a Good Man's Ass, which begins shooting in March. That sets up what we're guessing will be the biggest scramble for bootleg dailies since Attack of the Clones."

An interview with Bam Margera in 2005 suggested the movie would follow. However, a later interview with SuicideGirls confirmed that Margera had either moved away from Warner Bros. or the information was never true.

"Then I have some meetings about this movie called Kiss a Good Man's Ass. We've been talking to this company called Radar Pictures. We've been rewriting it because we want to change little things about it. So we just finished the final script and we're all going to read it today and see if anybody wants to make any last minute changes. It's about a kid who invents this garbage juicer which basically mashes trash and out comes delicious root beer, kerosene or rat piss. You can choose which one you want to come out. A businessman sees the invention and totally claims it as his own. The young kid spends the whole rest of time getting it back."

During filming at Don Vito's home in West Chester, Pennsylvania, aircraft, cars, and a gun festival interrupted the shoot, as did children who gathered around the set when school let out. This led to several re-shoots. On one occasion when a car drove past, Margera was furious and started shouting profanity at the driver as he drove past.

In August 2008, the official Minghags website came online.

During the production of the movie cast member Ryan Dunn approached former CKY crew member Raab Himself to appear in the film, however, he declined the offer.

The film was the final appearance of Vincent Margera as Don Vito before his death in 2015. As per a court sentence issued in 2007, he was ordered to not portray his character or make any media appearances for 10 years.

== Premise ==
The storyline in Minghags is built around the Garbage Juicer, which was featured in the "Invention of the Future" contest in Haggard: The Movie.

"A guy who invented this thing called the garbage juicer. You can take garbage and mash it into the trash can, and it has three spouts. You can choose delicious root beer, grapefruit juice or kerosene. This businessman steals the invention from him so the guy spends the whole time trying to dick the businessman over."
