= CKY3 =

CKY3 may refer to:

- CKY3 (film), the third of the CKY videos, a series of videos by Bam Margera
- Norway House Water Aerodrome, the ICAO airport code for the airport in Canada
