= CKY2 =

CKY2 may refer to:

- CKY2K, the second of the CKY videos, a series of videos by Bam Margera
- Whitewood Airport, the ICAO airport code for the airport in Canada
