= Brandon DiCamillo =

American television personality (born 1977)

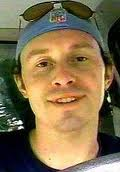
- Born: March 15, 1977 (age 49); West Chester, Pennsylvania, U.S.
- Other name: Dico
- Occupation: Television personality
- Years active: 1998–2014
- Known for: CKY; Jackass; Viva La Bam

Brandon DiCamillo (born March 15, 1977) is an American former television personality. A founding member of the CKY crew, he appeared in the CKY video series as well as MTV's Jackass, Viva La Bam, and Bam's Unholy Union series.

== Biography ==
DiCamillo was born on March 15, 1977 in West Chester, Pennsylvania. He attended West Chester East High School. He first appeared as a member of the CKY crew in the CKY video series, which he co-wrote together with Bam Margera.

He appeared in the MTV reality comedy series Jackass, Viva La Bam, Blastazoid, and Bam's Unholy Union.

He was a member of parody band Gnarkill.

In 2017, DiCamillo started the Attic Aficionados podcast with Tom Barbalet.

== Personal life ==
DiCamillo has expressed distaste for Hollywood, saying that working for MTV was sometimes "too corporate". In 2017, Joe Frantz said that DiCamillo had left the CKY crew years prior to live a private life with his wife and children.

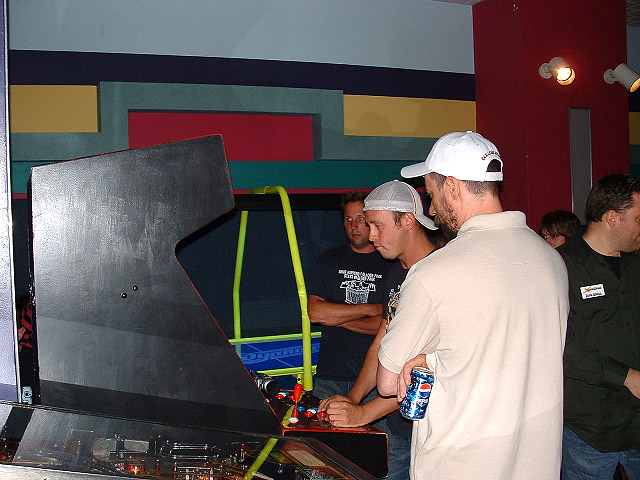
DiCamillo attaining the world record in Mortal Kombat, 2008

In September 2008, DiCamillo set a world record in the arcade game Mortal Kombat, achieving a final score of 10,226,500. Among the audience in Wyomissing, Pennsylvania, were officiants Mark Alpiger (representing ClassicArcadeGaming.com) and Dave Nelson (representing TwinGalaxies.com). DiCamillo's score had dropped to sixth place by 2023.

== Filmography ==
=== Television ===
Year	Title	Role	Notes
2000–2001	Jackass	Himself	25 episodes Writer
2003–2006	Viva La Bam	Himself	43 episodes
2006	Blastazoid	Himself	Co-creator; Director; Producer
2007	Bam's Unholy Union	Himself	8 episodes
2008	Jackassworld.com: 24 Hour Takeover	Himself	TV special Archived footage
2008	Bamimation	Himself (voice)	TV short Co-creator; Executive producer
2014	CKY: The Greatest Hits	Himself	Archived footage
2017	Epicly Later'd: Bam Margera	Himself	Archive footage TV documentary

=== Films ===
Year	Title	Role	Notes
1998	Toy Machine: Jump Off A Building	Himself	Direct-to-video release
1999	Landspeed: CKY	Himself	Writer; Direct-to-video release
2000	CKY2K	Himself	Writer; Direct-to-video release
2001	CKY 3	Himself	Director; Writer; Direct-to-video release
2001	CKY Documentary	Himself	Direct-to-video documentary
2002	Jackass: The Movie	Himself	Writer; Guest appearances
2002	CKY4: The Latest & Greatest	Himself	Direct-to-video release
2003	Haggard: The Movie	Various	Writer; Art director
2006	Dunn & Vito's Rock Tour	Himself	Host; Co-executive producer Direct-to-video release
2006	Jackass Number Two	Himself	Writer; Guest appearances
2007	Jackass 2.5	Himself	Writer; Guest appearances
2008	Assassination of a High School President		Stunts
2008	The Wrestler	Audience member	Cameo; Uncredited
2008	Hotdog Casserole	Various	Writer; Costumes
2009	Minghags	Various	Writer; Co-director; Executive producer
2009	Jackass: The Lost Tapes	Himself	Archived footage
2010	The Vampires of Zanzibar	Lord Weasel Titties	
2012	Cattle Bag	Various	Director; Writer; Editor
2014	Borrowed Happiness	Darren	
2022	Jackass Forever	Himself	Archive footage
2026	Jackass: Best and Last	Himself	Archive footage

=== Music videos ===
Year	Artist	Track	Role	Notes
2002	CKY	"Flesh into Gear"	Himself	
2004	Clutch	"The Mob Goes Wild"	Courier	
2011	Mega64	"Madden Rap 2012"	John Madden	Co-writer and performer

== Discography ==
- Volume 2 (1999)
- Otimen Recording Hell! (A.K.A. Bran's Freestyles) (2001)
- Gnarkill (2002)
- Gnarkill vs. Unkle Matt and the ShitBirdz (2006)
- Gnarkill III (2008)
- Gnarkall Prank Calls, Vol. 1 (2010)
- Gnarkall Prank Calls, Vol. 2 Assault on Call Waiting (2010)
- Gnarkall Prank Calls, Vol. 3 Spring Time Cootchie (2010)
- Gnarkall Prank Calls, Vol. 4 Pleasures Treasures (2010)
- Brandon Dicamillo, Pizza Pasta Pizzelle 1 (2012)
- Brandon Dicamillo, Pizza Pasta Pizzelle 2 (2012)
