= A Halfway House Christmas =

- Directed by: Eric Moyer
- Written by: Eric Moyer
- Produced by: Frank Carney
- Starring: Robert Romanus; Ryan Dunn; Rake Yohn; Jared Hasselhoff
- Narrated by: Bobcat Goldthwait
- Cinematography: Nelson Carlson
- Edited by: Eric Moyer
- Distributed by: Echelon Entertainment
- Release date: December 16, 2005
- Country: United States
- Language: English

A Halfway House Christmas is a 2005 film written and directed by Eric Moyer, produced by Frank Carney, and starring Robert Romanus. Also appearing are Ryan Dunn and Rake Yohn. Evil Jared Hasselhoff plays a nasty Santa. Bobcat Goldthwait narrates.

== Plot ==
In this spoof of reality television, five recovering drug and alcohol addicts try to live in a house together during the holidays. The movie follows the participants as they attempt to stay clean and sober for Christmas, while the network's quest for ratings may endanger their recovery.

== Cast ==
- Robert Romanus as Daryl
- Ryan Dunn as Buzz
- Rake Yohn as Killer
- Bob Goldthwait as Narrator (voice)
- 'Evil' Jared Hasselhoff as Santa
- Marisa Kettering as Amanda
- Kelly Kunik as Patty
- Matteo LeCompte as Barry
- Chris Line as Brett
- Charles Moffitt as Tweak
- Rod Sellers as Rod
- Brian Walsh as Ryan

== See also ==
- List of Christmas films
