= Haggard: The Movie =

- DVD cover
- Directed by: Bam Margera
- Written by: Bam Margera; Chris "Hoofbite" Aspite; Brandon DiCamillo
- Produced by: Bam Margera; Joe Frantz
- Starring: Ryan Dunn; Jenn Rivell; Brandon DiCamillo; Bam Margera; Rake Yohn; Chris Raab
- Cinematography: Joe Frantz
- Edited by: Bam Margera
- Music by: HIM
- Production company: Adio Entertainment
- Distributed by: 411 Productions; Ventura Distribution
- Release date: June 24, 2003
- Running time: 96 minutes
- Country: United States
- Language: English
- Budget: $550,000 (estimated)

Haggard: The Movie (or simply Haggard) is a 2003 American independent comedy film based on the story of how reality television personality Ryan Dunn's girlfriend may have cheated on him. The film was financed, directed and produced by Dunn's Jackass co-star and longtime friend Bam Margera.

== Plot ==
Ryan (Ryan Dunn) is devastated and depressed after his girlfriend Glauren (Jenn Rivell) breaks up with him. He believes Glauren is seeing someone else and attempts to call her several times. Eventually she answers, only to reveal that she is in fact seeing someone named Hellboy (Rake Yohn), but denies sleeping with him. Ryan does not believe her and runs to the local coffee house where he finds his friend, Valo (Bam Margera), to explain what happened. After attacking a customer for "taunting" him, Ryan asks Valo to vandalize Glauren's house, promising to pay him and Falcone (Brandon DiCamillo) $100 each to do it. Valo then suggests that he should try and talk to some other girls. Ryan tries his luck with a girl in the coffee house, but after he insults her, she stabs him in the eye with a fork, resulting in him having to wear an eyepatch until it heals.

Valo seeks out Falcone, who is in his basement working on the "Reverse Microwave" (a microwave oven that now cools things down) for the upcoming "Invention of the Future" contest. After Valo explains Ryan's request, Falcone agrees to vandalize Glauren's house only because he needs the $100 to buy Freon to get the invention working. At Glauren's house, Falcone defecates in the gas tank of Glauren's car and has Valo duct tape Don Vito's (Vincent Margera) feces to her garage door. They are interrupted by the sudden arrival of Glauren and Hellboy, forcing Valo to hide in some nearby bushes. Hellboy ends up urinating into them, onto Valo's face, as Falcone watches from the roof in amusement. After returning to collect their reward from Ryan, they discover he got a pathetic tattoo of a rhino because Glauren loves rhinos. Over the next few days, Ryan sinks deeper into depression, much to the annoyance of Don Vito, whose house Ryan lives in.

While Falcone picks up his dim-witted cousin Raab (Chris Raab) from the train station, Valo seeks advice from Dooli (Brandon Novak) and Naked Dave (David DeCurtis) about some stress relief solutions for Ryan. Naked Dave suggests that Ryan should break bottles behind a Wawa convenience store. Ryan gets arrested for it, but after hearing about his problem, the arresting cop (Tony Hawk) gives him a break, since he happens to be going through the same problem with his "soon-to-be-ex-wife".

Still depressed and not convinced that Glauren didn't sleep with Hellboy, Ryan gives Valo a video camera and asks for him to break into Glauren's house to find and record any evidence of her sleeping with Hellboy. Falcone agrees to go along with the break-in, and suggests that Raab be the getaway driver; Valo reluctantly agrees (as he hates Raab because of his voice, his laugh, his stupidity, and a grunting noise he makes throughout the film). In an attempt to patch up their relationship, Ryan and Glauren meet for a date and decide to get back together, but Ryan is unable to contact Valo to call off the break-in.

Right after Ryan leaves from escorting her home, Glauren runs off with Hellboy to a bonfire with his friends. At that time, Valo and Falcone break in and start recording their findings with the camera, such as a dildo in her drawers and pages of her diary, which Falcone reads aloud. Unfortunately, Glauren and Hellboy return home early, forcing Valo and Falcone to hide in her closet and watch as they have sex. When Hellboy notices the camera left on the dresser, Valo and Falcone make a speedy escape with the camera to Raab's car and get away, but not before Falcone sustains a beating from a pursuing Hellboy. A happier Ryan meets them at Valo's place, telling them he is convinced that his relationship with Glauren is restored. However, when they show him the footage from the break-in (including Hellboy and Glauren having sex), he becomes angry at Glauren's betrayal. Valo and Falcone tell him not to worry, as they have a plan to get revenge on Hellboy.

After Falcone (in disguise) falsely informs Hellboy that a new album from the band Gnarkill was released at the music shop Record Bin, Falcone prank calls the Record Bin owner, Cactus (Jason Ellis), and insults Gnarkill, whom Cactus happens to be a big fan of. Upon arriving at the shop, Hellboy is beaten by an enraged Cactus (mistakenly believing it was Hellboy who called him), while Ryan, Valo, and Falcone look on through the shop's door. However, Hellboy spots them and engages the trio in a lengthy chase, which forces them to split up. Ryan hides in a taxi with Heather (Angie Cuturic), who eventually becomes his new girlfriend; Valo barely escapes with the timely intervention of a skateboard arranged by Dooli; Falcone ends up in a junkyard full of refrigerators containing the Freon he's been looking for; and Hellboy is run over by the taxi carrying Ryan and Heather.

While Ryan and Heather's romance blossoms, Falcone is able to finish the Reverse Microwave to enter for the invention contest, winning the first place prize of a mountain bike covered with diamonds. At the after-party, as Falcone shows off his bike, Glauren arrives in an attempt to seduce Ryan, only for him to reject her. Glauren storms off angrily, but not before randomly slapping Valo and pushing and shoving a few men. Glauren is then accompanied by a lesbian, while Ryan remains happily with his new lover. Upset that his date didn't show up and everything is working out fine for his friends, Valo finds Ali (Olivia Hammond), an acquaintance from the contest who invites him back to her house, where they begin to make out. During this time, Ryan makes out with Heather and Glauren and the lesbian make out as well, with Glauren becoming a lesbian herself. Unfortunately for Valo, an injured and heavily bandaged Hellboy arrives, revealing himself to be Ali's brother, and Valo hastily escapes through a window. The next day, Valo and Falcone are seen sitting on a park bench, where they laugh about Valo's experience with Hellboy and Ryan going through the same exact problem with Heather. They then walk away, happy that everything is as it should be.

== Cast ==
- Ryan Dunn as Ryan
- Bam Margera as Valo
- Jenn Rivell as Glauren
- Brandon DiCamillo as Falcone / Taxi Driver / Announcer for Appliance Contest / Gnarkill Band Member
- Tony Hawk as Cop
- Rake Yohn as Hellboy
- Vincent Margera as Don Vito / Appliance Contest Judge
- Chris Raab as Raab
- CKY (with Brandon DiCamillo) as Gnarkill
- Brandon Novak as Dooli
- Jess Margera as Bum / Tetris Addict
- David DeCurtis as Naked Dave
- Bucky Lasek as Skater in Chase Scene
- Phil Margera as Fat Guy with Water Melon / Bakery Shop Owner
- Jason Ellis as Cactus
- Missy Rothstein as Beth
- Angie Cuturic as Heather
- Olivia Hammond as Ali
- April Margera as Lady in Coffee Shop (Uncredited)
- Matthew McGrory as Doorman at 15 North Cafe (Uncredited)

== Soundtrack ==
- Amorphis – "Black Winter Day"
- Astor Piazzolla – "Knife Fight"
- Bomfunk MC's – "Freestyler"
- CKY – "Shock and Terror"
- Clutch – "Big News"
- Dead or Alive – "Just What I Always Wanted"
- Faithless – "The Garden"
- Faithless – "Sunday 8pm"
- Gnarkill – "Sneaking into Your House"
- HIM – "Again"
- HIM – "Beautiful"
- HIM – "Lose You Tonight"
- HIM – "One Last Time"
- HIM – "Pretending"
- HIM – "You Are the One"
- In Flames – "Acoustic Medley"
- Kiezner and Hassidic Musk – "Fun Taslach"
- New Order – "Someone Like You"
- Orbital – "Doctor?"
- Otimen Recording Hell – "Sneakin' into Your House"
- Shantalla – "The Rocky Road to Cashel"
- Slayer – "Divine Intervention"
- Sopor Æternus & the Ensemble of Shadows – "Resume"
- The Stooges – "Search and Destroy"
- Toy Dolls – "Livin' La Vida Loca"
- Unanimated – "Life Demise"
- Within Temptation – "Deceiver of Fools"

== HD re-release ==
In 2011, producer Joe Frantz announced via Radio Bam that Haggard and the CKY video series were going to be re-released in high definition. On January 19, 2014, he gave an update on the project via his Facebook page, stating:

I'm in the process of raising funds and a cutting distribution deal to bring HAGGARD 10 YEAR ANNIVERSARY EDITION to high definition. THIS IS NO PLUG, believe me…It's very difficult to get the funds I need to do this correctly, and I've been working at it in all my spare time for a year... It will take some time, and a lot of work and passion on my part. I love this film with all my heart and will eventually get it out, with all the lost scenes intact, plus a lot more of the "behind the scenes" stuff you all loved. Thanks all for the support, it means everything to me!
