= Commando VIP =

- Directed by: Rupert Smith
- Starring: Nigel Benn; Steve Collins; Jason Cowan; Ryan Dunn; Lee Latchford-Evans; Heather Peace
- Narrated by: Ralph Ineson
- Music by: Garry Judd
- Country of origin: United Kingdom
- Original language: English
- No. of seasons: 1
- No. of episodes: 6

Production
- Executive producer: Hamish Barbour
- Producer: John Ireland
- Cinematography: Laurence Blyth; Scott Milton; Simon Reay
- Editors: Toby Carr; Greg Coyne; Mikhael Junod
- Running time: 48 minutes
- Production company: IWC Media

Original release
- Network: Channel 5
- Release: October 19 – November 23, 2005

Commando VIP is a British reality television show that aired on Channel 5 from 19 October to 23 November 2005. It put six celebrities through tough military-style challenges after being trained by three real commandos. The show was narrated by Ralph Ineson.

== Cast ==
The celebrities who participated in the show were:

- Nigel Benn (boxer)
- Steve Collins (boxer)
- Jason Cowan (former Big Brother contestant)
- Ryan Dunn (from Jackass)
- Lee Latchford-Evans (former member of Steps)
- Heather Peace (actress)
