= Proving Ground (TV series) =

Reality show

- Title card
- Genre: Reality
- Presented by: Ryan Dunn; Jessica Chobot
- Music by: Eric Hester
- Country of origin: United States
- Original language: English
- No. of seasons: 1
- No. of episodes: 9

Production
- Executive producers: Michael Bloom; Bruce Klassen
- Producers: Jenn van Persaud; Shayna Weber; Farshad Tehrani
- Cinematography: Johnny Martin
- Editors: Buzz Chatman; Jesus Huidobro; Noah Rosenstein
- Camera setup: Multi-camera
- Running time: 22–24 minutes
- Production company: Bongo Pictures

Original release
- Network: G4
- Release: June 14 – September 6, 2011

Proving Ground is an American reality television series that aired in the United States on G4 in 2011, hosted by stuntman Ryan Dunn and video game journalist Jessica Chobot.

In each episode, Dunn and Chobot test concepts from pop culture such as video games, comics, television and movies to see if any are easily replicated in the real world. In the first episode, they test the concept of a real life Super Mario Kart go-kart race with banana peels and "Koopa Troopa shells".

The series premiered on June 14 to 31,000 viewers. Most of the testing segments were filmed at the Saugus Speedway. On June 20, Dunn died in a drunk driving accident in Pennsylvania. The network immediately pulled the series from its schedule until management determined whether the remaining episodes should air. On June 27, it announced that the show would return on July 19 and the remaining episodes would air in the same time slot.
