= CKY (film series) =

1999–2002 video series by Bam Margera

CKY (video series)
- The covers for the original four releases: CKY, CKY2K, CKY3, and CKY4
- Directed by: Bam Margera; Joe Frantz; Ryan Gee; Brandon DiCamillo
- Written by: Bam Margera; Brandon DiCamillo
- Produced by: Bam Margera; Joe Frantz
- Starring: Bam Margera; Brandon DiCamillo; Ryan Dunn; Chris Raab; Rake Yohn; Jess Margera; Brandon Novak
- Narrated by: Brandon DiCamillo
- Cinematography: Joe Frantz
- Edited by: Bam Margera; Joe Frantz
- Music by: CKY
- Production company: Bam Margera Productions
- Distributed by: Landspeed; Ventura Distribution; SLAM! Films; Revolver Entertainment
- Country: United States
- Language: English

The CKY video series is a series of videos produced by Bam Margera and Brandon DiCamillo and other residents of West Chester, Pennsylvania. "CKY" stands for "Camp Kill Yourself". The series was part of the basis for what eventually became Jackass.

Four videos were released, Landspeed presents: CKY (later called CKY), CKY2K, CKY3, and CKY4: The Latest & Greatest. There is also a CKY documentary DVD, which is a supplemental item in the CKY Box Set, as well as two CKY Trilogy sets, both of which are compilation DVDs featuring scenes from the previous CKY DVDs. The videos were named after Bam Margera's brother Jess and his band CKY.

The videos feature Bam Margera, Brandon DiCamillo, their friends, and Margera's relatives performing various stunts and pranks, interspersed with skate footage of Margera and other professional skateboarders. A trademark of the skating footage was to show unsuccessful trick attempts immediately followed by the same skater pulling the trick off. CKY started when Margera and his friends were in the same graphics arts class at school in West Chester, Pennsylvania. During class, they would go out to a field and film skits, eventually being compiled into the CKY series. In a 2002 interview, Margera said that more than 400,000 copies of the series have been sold.

In 2018, producer Joe Frantz confirmed that he had begun remastering all four videos for HD release. They were released in 2019 on the now-defunct streaming service DCTV.

== The CKY crew ==
In addition to Margera and DiCamillo, the core members of the CKY crew included Ryan Dunn, Chris Raab (aka Raab Himself), Rake Yohn, and Bam's elder brother Jess. Jess' involvement with the video side of CKY became increasingly limited as CKY the band became popular, and touring and recording commitments took up most of his time.

The first video stars the main crew, as well as Ryan Gee (aka The Gill), Mike Maldonado, Chris Aspite (aka Hoofbite), Kerry Getz, brothers Mark and Chris Hanna, and Rake's younger brother Art Webb. Bam's father, Phil, was also featured (uncredited) in the first video. Bam's ex-girlfriend Jenn Rivell, and David Decurtis (aka Naked Dave) starred in the second video, which also features Bam's mother April (uncredited), and skateboarder Tim O'Connor. Chris Raab was called Raab Himself in the third video, which also featured CKY band members Deron Miller and Chad I Ginsburg, as well as skateboarders Tony Hawk, Brandon Novak, and Mike Vallely. Bam's uncle Vincent (aka Don Vito) starred in the fourth video. Jenn Rivell's daughter is also seen in some clips.

The CKY videos brought Bam and his friends to the attention of Jeff Tremaine who drafted them into the cast of Jackass which aired for three seasons on MTV, from 2000 until 2001. Most Jackass skits featuring the CKY crew were lifted from previously released CKY material or were recorded by the crew in West Chester, Pennsylvania, while the Los Angeles-based faction of the Jackass team featuring Johnny Knoxville, Chris Pontius, Wee Man, Dave England, Preston Lacy, Ehren McGhehey, and Steve-O filmed in California.

A subsequent MTV spin-off, entitled Viva La Bam (2003–2006), followed Bam Margera and his crew as they tortured Bam's family, and generally wreaked havoc in West Chester, and around the world. Another spin-off, titled Bam's Unholy Union (2007), featured Bam planning his wedding with some of the CKY crew members. A one-episode Spike TV special, titled Bam's World Domination, featured Bam, Dunn, and skateboarder Tim O'Connor participating in the Tough Guy Competition in Perton, Staffordshire, England. This special aired two days before Jackass 3D (2010) was released.

Ryan Dunn also had his own spin-off TV show, titled Homewrecker. To qualify for Homewrecker, a participant had to submit to the show a story of how he or she was victimized by one of their friends. Each segment opened with the "victim" explaining to Dunn what happened to them. Dunn then observed the offender to get additional ideas on what to do. Finally, Dunn and a team of helpers helped the participant redo their friend's room to fit what the evildoer had done to them. It aired on MTV in 2005.

A one-episode MTV special, titled Blastazoid, featured Brandon DiCamillo, and Rake Yohn, creating a "live action Donkey Kong", based on the 1981 video game with the same name. It also features stunts and pranks similar to the CKY videos. It aired in 2006.

A spin-off movie, titled Haggard: The Movie, was released in 2003. A loose sequel to this movie, titled Minghags: The Movie, came out in 2009.

Bam also hosted his own radio show, Radio Bam on SiriusXM, which aired from 2004 to 2013. The show's cast originally starred Bam, his brother Jess, Brandon DiCamillo, Brandon Novak, Rake Yohn, and Joe Frantz. It featured guest appearances from Ryan Dunn, Raab Himself, Bam's parents and uncle, Bam's then-wife Missy Rothstein, the CKY band members, and some Jackass cast members.

== CKY ==
CKY
- Original 1999 VHS release
- Directed by: Bam Margera
- Written by: Bam Margera; Brandon DiCamillo
- Produced by: Rob Erickson; Bam Margera
- Starring: The CKY crew
- Cinematography: Bam Margera; Ryan Gee
- Edited by: Rob Erickson; Bam Margera
- Music by: CKY
- Production company: Landspeed - Tum Yeto Inc. 1998
- Distributed by: Tum Yeto (1999); Ventura Distribution (somewhere later in 1999)
- Release date: March 1, 1999
- Running time: approx. 55 minutes
- Country: United States
- Language: English

Landspeed presents: CKY, the first film in the series, was released on March 1, 1999, featuring Bam Margera and Brandon DiCamillo on the cover. The name Landspeed comes from Landspeed Wheels, the wheel company created by Rob Erickson and distributed by Tod Swank through Tum Yeto Inc. Landspeed made skateboard wheels and clothing from 1998 to 2000. The name CKY comes from Jess Margera's band. The video shows a mixed up variety of random, homemade, crazy humor, and mostly focuses on stunts, pranks, and crazy behavior, as well as skateboarding. The music features original songs by the band CKY, including "96 Quite Bitter Beings".

=== Differences between the VHS and DVD versions ===
- The copyright notice was taken off because it has Tum Yeto references.
- In the opening credits, the Landspeed title was taken off.
- A scene was also removed. It featured Brandon DiCamillo running around a Christmas parade as Santa Claus, because the real Santa was late. No one at the parade except for Bam and his crew knew that Brandon wasn't involved with the parade.
- In the Round 1 version of CKY, there are clips removed, not only the Santa clip, but things such as bits and pieces and extended skits, and to make up for that it has more extra footage at the end than before.
- Some skits in the DVD version are edited or cut short. Such as, Bam sings two Bon Jovi songs in the street to strangers in the VHS version (they cut one of them in the DVD version).

=== CKY Documentary ===
CKY Documentary is a compilation of footage from the first CKY video. It is in a double pack on the CKY Trilogy Round One DVD and CKY the box set (quadruple pack) DVD and show profiles of each member of the CKY crew, including some older skits from when Bam Margera was in high school and the story of how CKY was created. It is entirely in black and white.

== CKY2K ==
CKY2K
- Directed by: Bam Margera
- Written by: Bam Margera; Brandon DiCamillo
- Produced by: Joe Frantz; Cat in Color
- Starring: The CKY crew
- Cinematography: Ryan Gee; Joe Frantz
- Edited by: Bam Margera
- Music by: CKY
- Distributed by: Ventura Distribution
- Release date: May 22, 2000
- Running time: approx. 44 minutes
- Country: United States
- Language: English

CKY2K, the second film in the series, was released on May 22, 2000, featuring Rake Yohn on the cover. The video features a trip to Iceland, the rental car, a baseball game, "Bran's Freestyle", and other random items. The music features early versions of Flesh into Gear and Sporadic Movement by CKY; as well as many other artists, including an opening scene with Rammstein, Iceland scenes with Björk and Orbital, and a skateboarding scene with Believer "Dies Irae (Day of Wrath)" and Aphex Twin.

Near the end of the video, there is a scene in which a minor exposes his genitalia in front of a public restaurant. The video explained that "this is what happens when you tell Bam you'll do anything to be in CKY." In 2003, the parents of the minor sued. During the hearing, a County Court Judge ruled that images of the plaintiff "must be deleted from future versions" of the video. Subsequently, CKY2K was discontinued due (in part) to copyright issues. The first major issue was from Björk.

=== Iceland ===
The video was notable for the documentary of their trip to Iceland. The music features "Hyperballad" by Björk where Bam Margera and the crew hang out on the top of a mountain with gorgeous views from the top.

As they stayed in a hotel somewhere in Iceland (the hotel at the airport), Brandon DiCamillo smeared feces on Ryan Dunn while he was sleeping on the bed. Smeared with feces, Dunn fought back by urinating on DiCamillo sleeping on the floor. Later, they discuss the incident while traveling by car.

The crew performs a variety of stunts, including guys riding on furniture on the road as a sled, featuring music by Orbital playing "Halcyon + On + On". Later, Bam was outside Björk's house calling her.

=== The rental car ===
Bam drives a Chevrolet Cavalier after paying $9 for extra insurance. With the car, Bam Margera attempts crazy reckless driving maneuvers, knocking over orange cones and skidding turns. The next day, Rake Yohn finished off the already damaged car by setting fire to the radio, which completely burned the entire car. The music features an early version of the song "Sporadic Movement" by the band CKY.

=== Differences between the VHS and DVD versions ===
- The warnings and disclaimers were removed from the beginning of the VHS version, and instead placed at the beginning of the DVD menu, which then shows Bam playing with the rock group HIM.
- A small note at the end of "Bran's Freestyle" by CKY, and featured some clips after the credits, showing Bam Margera filming for seven teen sips, which includes a short preview of his film at the very end of the video. In the DVD version, the end credits were cut short and instead played "One Last Time" by HIM and featured alternate footage, including more furniture sledding and Bam commanding his father Phil to do push-ups.

== CKY3 ==
CKY3
- Directed by: Bam Margera; Brandon DiCamillo
- Written by: Brandon DiCamillo; Bam Margera
- Produced by: Joe Frantz; Bam Margera; Cat in Color
- Starring: The CKY crew
- Cinematography: Joe Frantz; Ryan Gee
- Edited by: Bam Margera
- Music by: CKY
- Distributed by: Ventura Distribution
- Release date: August 19, 2001
- Running time: approx. 45 minutes
- Country: United States
- Language: English

CKY3, the third film in the series, was released in 2001, featuring Bam Margera and his father Phil on the cover. Soon after its release, Margera and DiCamillo were sued over the fight scene involving Mike Vallely. The issue was settled out of court in 2006. It was also the first of the videos to be taken off the market due to copyright restrictions. Some of the musicians (or their legal representation) were unhappy with Margera using their music without their permission. This would later happen with CKY2K and the box set including all three videos and the documentary.

== CKY4: The Latest & Greatest ==
CKY4: The Latest & Greatest
- Directed by: Bam Margera
- Written by: Bam Margera
- Produced by: Joe Frantz; Bam Margera; Cat in Color; Terry Hardy
- Starring: The CKY crew
- Cinematography: Joe Frantz; Ryan Gee
- Edited by: Bam Margera
- Music by: CKY
- Distributed by: Slam Films/Ventura Distribution
- Release date: November 10, 2002
- Running time: approx. 100 minutes
- Country: United States
- Language: English

CKY 4, the fourth and final film in the series, was released on November 10, 2002, featuring Ryan Dunn rolling off a roof in a barrel with Bam Margera recording on the cover. It has a marked improvement in editing techniques compared to the other films, mostly due to Bam Margera's newly acquired wealth and ability to purchase motion picture film cameras and use advanced post-production facilities. However, it also features a lot of older video material, some unseen, some extended and some off-cuts from previous CKY films. Scenes include Don Vito's "50 Shots of Peach Schnapps" as a bonus feature.

CKY4 is the only CKY video to be censored, and one of the few DVDs to have been censored three times.

- A DVD Easter egg showed Bam Margera and his then-girlfriend mid-coitus with altered color mixes to avoid nudity. This wasn't the first time CKY videos had attracted trouble of this sort, but none of the previous videos cut legal sexually themed scenes until this one, in mid-2003. The scene is only available on the first 5,000 copies.
- In 2002, Brandon DiCamillo and CKY drummer Jess Margera wrote a rap about Masters of the Universe characters Skeletor and Beast Man engaging in extreme homosexual behavior, called Skeletor vs Beastman. Mattel, owners of the Masters of the Universe franchise, heard about the rap, and were displeased. Margera was sent a cease-and-desist letter, and subsequent editions of the DVD have replaced this video with skateboarding footage.
- CKY guitarist Chad I Ginsburg, a fan of punk rocker G.G. Allin, visited his grave one day and after consuming an entire bottle of Jim Beam bourbon (Allin's favorite beverage), he proceeded to urinate on the grave and left an autographed copy of Infiltrate.Destroy.Rebuild., which was later stolen. Mixed in between the grave footage is CKY performing Allin's song "Bite It, You Scum".
- At the end of the "lil key key" Raab Himself's skit, there was an Easter egg that was also cut in 2003 for unknown reasons.

== CKY: The Greatest Hits ==
On November 2, 2014, MTV premiered a special in dedication of the CKY videos, featuring new interviews of the crew, as well as unreleased footage documenting the series as a whole. The special was directed by former CKY cinematographer Joe Frantz.

== High definition re-releases ==
Joe Frantz announced on a 2011 episode of Radio Bam that he was set to remaster the CKY series in HD. He stated the same will be done with Haggard: The Movie and Minghags. On January 19, 2014, Frantz gave an update on the project via his Facebook page, stating:

I'm in the process of raising funds and a cutting distribution deal to bring HAGGARD 10 YEAR ANNIVERSARY EDITION to hi definition. THIS IS NO PLUG, believe me…It's very difficult to get the funds I need to do this correctly, and I've been working at it in all my spare time for a year... It will take some time, and a lot of work and passion on my part. I love this film with all my heart and will eventually get it out, with all the lost scenes in tact [sic], plus a lot more of the "behind the scenes" stuff you all loved. Thanks all for the support, it means everything to me!

On December 2, 2018, Frantz gave an official update on the project, stating that production is now underway. The remasters released from March 14 to April 25 on the now-defunct streaming service DCTV. On May 15, 2021, Frantz announced on his Instagram and Twitter accounts that he will be uploading the HD re-releases for free on YouTube.

== See also ==
- CKY (band)
- Jackass
- Haggard: The Movie
- Viva La Bam
- Radio Bam
- Homewrecker
- Bam's Unholy Union
- Minghags: The Movie
- Bam's World Domination
- Bam's Bad Ass Game Show
