= Ryan Dunn =

American television personality and stunt performer (1977–2011)

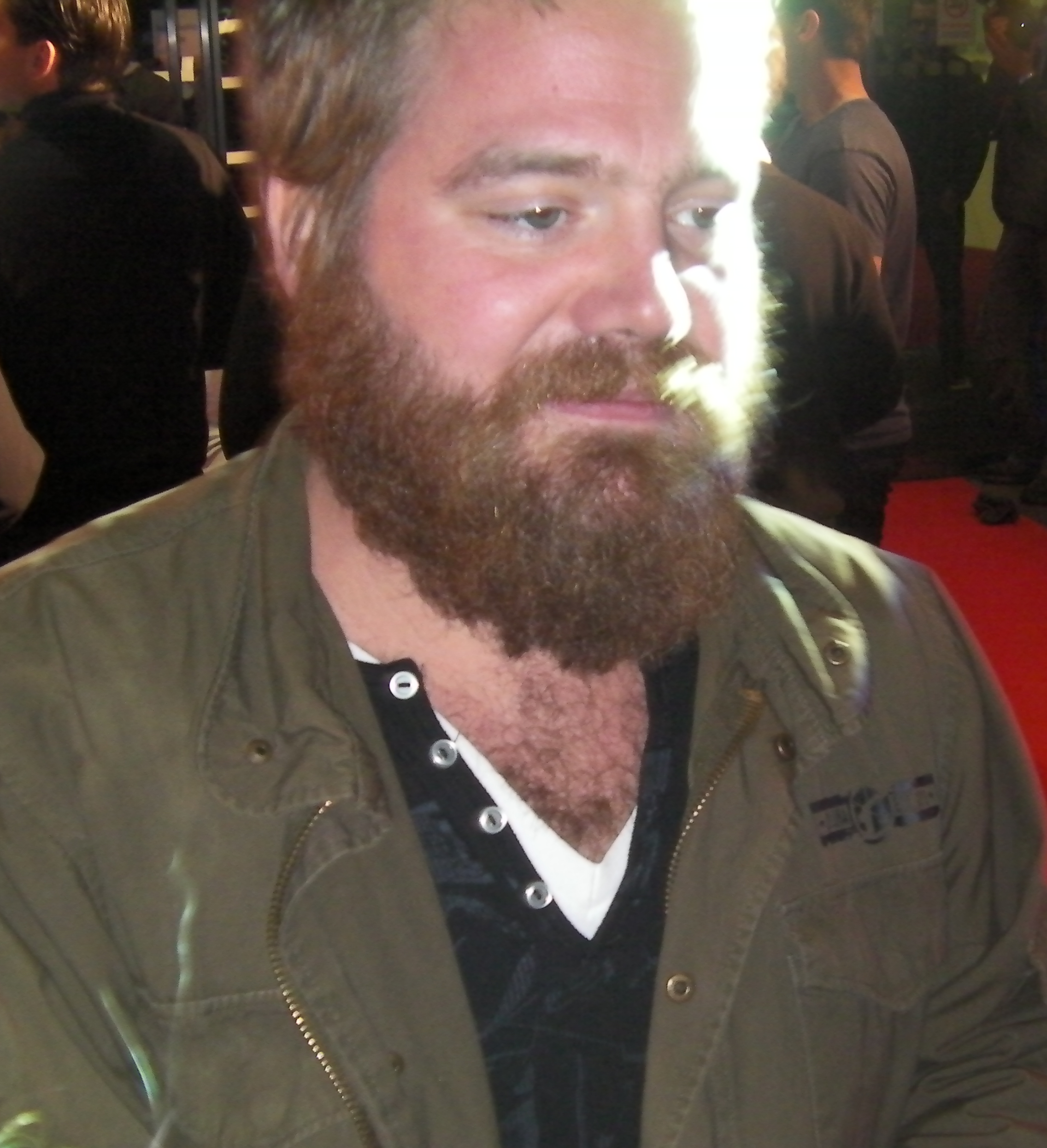
- Dunn at the Jackass 3D London premiere in November 2010
- Born: Ryan Matthew Dunn; June 11, 1977; Medina, Ohio, U.S.
- Died: June 20, 2011 (aged 34): West Goshen Township, Pennsylvania, U.S.
- Cause of death: Car crash
- Resting place: Highland Drive Cemetery, Brecksville, Ohio, U.S.
- Other names: Random Hero; Prima Dunna; Plugs
- Occupations: Stunt performer; television personality; actor; comedian
- Years active: 1997–2011
- Known for: Co-star of Jackass

Ryan Matthew Dunn (June 11, 1977 – June 20, 2011) was an American stunt performer and television personality. He was one of the stars of the MTV reality stunt show Jackass and its film franchise from 2000-2011.

Born in Medina, Ohio, Dunn rose to fame in the late 1990s as a member of the CKY crew with his long-time friend Bam Margera, with whom he performed extreme stunts and pranks and recorded them on video, which led to the rise of Jackass in the early 2000s. He also hosted the TV series Homewrecker and Proving Ground, and appeared in the feature films Blonde Ambition and Street Dreams, as well as in Margera's films Haggard and Minghags. Dunn died in a car crash in 2011, while driving drunk, at the age of 34.

== Early life ==
Dunn was born in Medina, Ohio. He grew up in Williamsville, New York, before moving to West Chester, Pennsylvania, where he went to West Chester East High School and where he met fellow Jackass star Bam Margera on the first day of school.

== Career ==
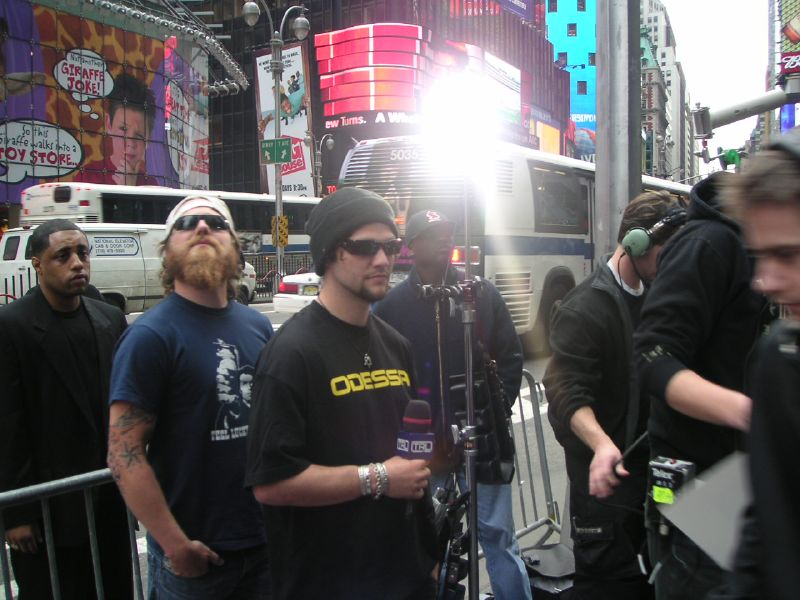
Dunn (second from left; blue shirt) and Bam Margera (center) during a live shoot in New York, April 2004

Dunn took part in the characteristic stunts that made Jackass famous, and featured in five released films, Jackass: The Movie, Jackass Number Two, Jackass 2.5, Jackass 3D, and Jackass 3.5. In 2006, Dunn and Bam Margera participated in the Gumball 3000 road rally in Margera's Lamborghini Gallardo. He later went on a tour with Don Vito called "The Dunn and Vito Rock Tour" for which the DVD was released on March 20, 2007. Dunn and Margera again participated in the rally in 2008.

Bam Margera stated during a December 2, 2008, radio interview with Big O and Dukes of 106.7 WJFK-FM, that he and Dunn would be going to Italy to film Where the F*%# Are My Ancestors. That same month, Dunn appeared on the episode "Smut" of Law & Order: Special Victims Unit in December 2008. He is also featured in a movie called Street Dreams which was released in spring 2009. He co-starred along with Rob Dyrdek and Paul Rodriguez Jr. Dunn was also featured on a show with fellow Jackass star Bam Margera about them traveling through Europe in a Viva la Bam-like show called Bam's World Domination for Spike. He appeared in Jackass 3D, which was released on October 15, 2010.

Dunn co-hosted G4's Proving Ground along with Jessica Chobot, which made its premiere on June 14, 2011, six days before his death. However, according to a G4 spokesperson, the channel decided to postpone the airing of further episodes. The spokesperson added, "The show is off the schedule as of today until we discuss next steps." On June 27, G4 announced they would air the remaining episodes starting on July 19, 2011. At the time of his death, Dunn was working on the film Welcome to the Bates Motel. The film was later renamed The Bates Haunting and was released in 2013.

== Personal life ==
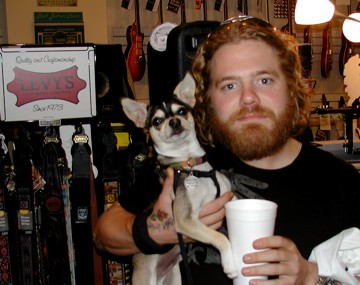
Dunn in the 2000s

From 2002 to his death, he was in a long-term relationship with Angie Cuturic, who had a part in Margera's directorial debut Haggard: The Movie and later Minghags. Dunn had several tattoos of Cuturic, including in his inner arm and left ring finger.

During shooting of the closing scenes for Jackass Number Two in 2006, Dunn injured his shoulder during one of his final scenes, in which he and co-star Bam Margera are pulled out of shot by a running horse by a rope tied around their feet. Dunn dropped straight onto his shoulder, causing damage to the muscles and leading to a blood clot that was at one point life-threatening, due to its proximity to his heart and brain. While seeking treatment for it and Lyme disease, Dunn became depressed, eventually cutting off all contact with his friends, co-workers, and others for nearly two years, and did not participate in Jackassworld.com: 24 Hour Takeover, or any subsequent events related to the films and series. He eventually returned to the Jackass cast in the production of Jackass 3D and Jackass 3.5 later saying that he was happy to rejoin the cast and had more enjoyment working on Jackass 3D than any previous film endeavors.

According to Steve-O, towards the end of Dunn's life it became apparent he was suffering from alcoholism; on one occasion, during the filming of Minute to Win It, he resorted to drinking after getting the shakes from withdrawal.

== Death ==
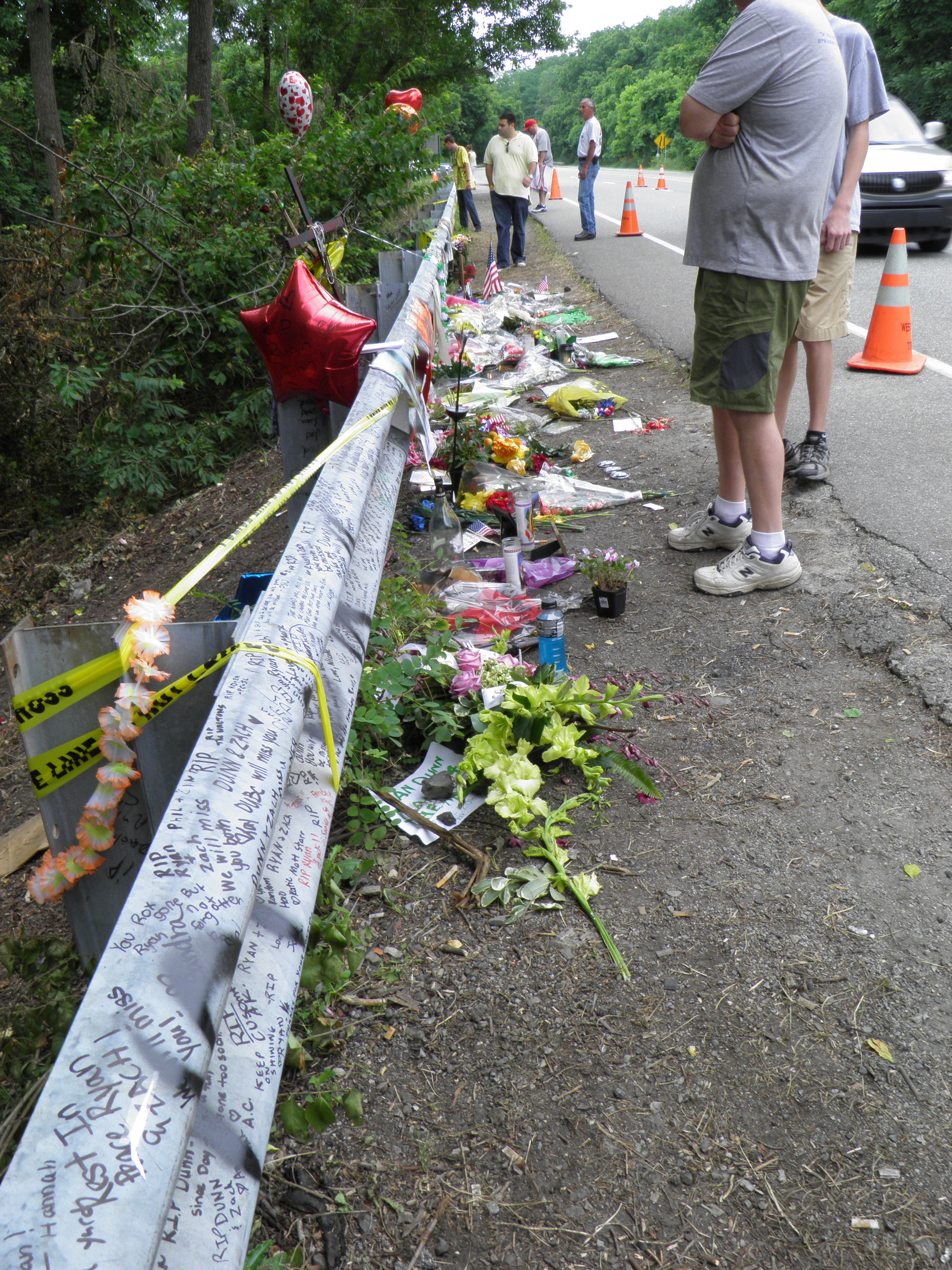
Roadside memorials left at the crash site

On June 20, 2011, at around 3:30 a.m. EDT, Dunn and Zachary Hartwell, a production assistant on Jackass Number Two, were returning from Barnaby's West Chester, a West Chester bar, in Dunn's Porsche 911 GT3 when Dunn veered off the road and struck a tree, after which the Porsche burst into flames in West Goshen Township, Chester County, Pennsylvania. Both Dunn, who had turned 34 nine days prior, and 30-year-old Hartwell were killed in the crash.

Hours before the crash, Dunn had posted a photo to his Tumblr account of himself and Hartwell drinking at the bar. He was identified in the police report as the vehicle's driver, and a subsequent toxicology report showed a blood alcohol content of 0.196%—more than twice the state's legal limit of 0.08%. The police report stated "speed may have been a contributing factor in the crash" and preliminary investigations suggested the car had been traveling between 132 and 140 miles per hour (212 and 225 km/h) in a 55 miles per hour (89 km/h) zone.

Prior to the drunk-driving crash that resulted in his death, Dunn had been convicted for driving under the influence of alcohol, resulting in him completing a treatment program as part of his sentence. "In 2005, Dunn was charged with driving under the influence of alcohol and entered a first-offender program that allowed him to clear his record after a certain period of good behavior," according to Patrick Carmody, Chester County Assistant District Attorney. Between 1998 and 2011, he received at least 23 driving citations, 10 of which were for speeding. Jess Margera also noted Dunn's habit for reckless driving in a Noisecreep interview, saying, "When I was 16-years old, he flipped a car we were in 10 times [laughs]. He crashed at least 10 cars in his life. That's just how Ryan was. He was into racing and all of that stuff and when you do that, you crash cars. The more successful that he became, the faster the cars got. He would soup up these cars that were already fast to begin with."

== Legacy ==
Dunn is remembered by friends and fans alike as the "go-to guy for outrageous stunts that even such stalwarts as Steve-O weren't willing to try" and "the kind of guy who would do anything for a friend," gaining the nickname "Random Hero". The term "random hero" was initially coined after a mutual friend was tackled on the street by "a random hero" while he was trying to get away from the police after an altercation; Dunn eventually inherited it as a nickname for his can-do attitude.

Following the news of his death, Dickhouse Productions and the producers of the show released the following statement:

I don't really know what to say right now everybody, because the sadness is overwhelming, but today we lost one of our own. Our brother Ryan Dunn has passed. He died in a car wreck in West Goshen, Pennsylvania this morning at 3 a.m. that's tough to write. Our hearts go out to his family and his beloved Angie. Ryan will be missed and remembered by us all. Thanks for the kind words of support everybody.

Many celebrities expressed their grief and condolences on Twitter, including Sofia Coppola, Tom Green, Carey Hart, Dwayne Johnson, Tony Hawk, and his Jackass cast members.

Kings of Leon also paid homage to Dunn at their London Hyde Park concert by dedicating their song "McFearless" to him. Skrillex dedicated his remix of the song "Cinema" to Dunn after a moment of silence. Alkaline Trio also dedicated their song "Goodbye Forever" to Dunn on their fifteen-year anniversary tour. Singer/songwriter Roger Alan Wade wrote and composed the song "The Light Outlives the Star", while also dedicating it to Dunn. Occasional Jackass member Loomis Fall also wrote the song "Bid Farewell" in memory of Dunn. Both songs were used in a music video tribute by Dickhouse Productions for its official website.

Dunn also came in at number three in top trending searches of 2011 on Google's Zeitgeist report following his death.

On November 28, 2011, MTV aired an hour-long tribute to Dunn, where several details of his life previously unknown to the public were revealed as well as never-before-seen stunts he performed. Dunn's parents, sister, friends and both Jackass and Viva La Bam cast mates recalled his early beginnings to final months.

The 2013 film Jackass Presents: Bad Grandpa is dedicated to him, as is the 2022 film Jackass Forever, which included an end-credits tribute to Dunn. Jackass 4.5 (2022) is also dedicated to him. Old footage of Dunn was also shown in the fifth and final Jackass movie, Jackass: Best and Last (2026).

== Filmography ==
Film
Year	Title	Role	Notes
1997	Invader	Army Private	
1999	Landspeed Presents: CKY	Himself	Direct-to-video
2000	CKY2K	Himself	Direct-to-video
2001	CKY3	Himself	Direct-to-video
2001	CKY Documentary	Himself	Direct-to-video
2001	Don't Try This at Home – The Steve-O Video Vol. 1	Himself	Guest appearances Direct-to-video
2002	Criminal Mischief	David Smith	
2002	Jackass: The Movie	Himself	Writer
2002	Don't Try This at Home – The Steve-O Video Vol. 2: The Tour	Himself	Guest appearances Direct-to-video
2002	CKY4: The Latest & Greatest	Himself	Direct-to-video
2003	Haggard: The Movie	Ry	
2003	Steve-O: Out on Bail	Himself	Guest appearances Direct-to-video
2004	Client 3815	Jackson	Short film
2005	A Halfway House Christmas	Buzz	Direct-to-video
2006	Dunn & Vito's Rock Tour	Himself	Direct-to-video; Executive producer
2006	The Dudesons Movie	Himself	Guest appearances
2006	Jackass Number Two	Himself	Writer
2007	Blonde Ambition	Griswold	
2007	3000 Miles	Himself	Direct-to-video documentary
2007	Jackass 2.5	Himself	Writer
2009	Street Dreams	Cash	
2009	Minghags: The Movie	Tucker	
2010	Jackass 3D	Himself	Writer
2011	Close-Up	The Drug Dealer	
2011	Jackass 3.5	Himself	Writer
2011	Living Will	Belcher	Producer; Posthumous release
2012	Booted	The Health Inspector	Posthumous release
2012	The Bates Haunting	Angry Customer	Posthumous release
2013	Earth Rocker	Himself	Clips; Posthumous release
2020	Steve-O: Gnarly	Himself	Archive footage Direct-to-video
2022	Jackass Forever	Himself	Archive footage
2022	Jackass 4.5	Himself	Archive footage
2026	Jackass: Best and Last	Himself	Archive footage

Television
Year	Title	Role	Notes
2000–2001	Jackass	Himself	21 episodes
2002	Jackass Backyard BBQ	Himself	TV special
2002	MTV Cribs	Himself	October 23, 2002, episode
2002	MTV Video Music Awards Latinoamérica 2002	Himself	Presenter
2003	Jackass Winterjam	Himself	TV special
2003–2006	Viva La Bam	Himself	41 episodes
2005	Homewrecker	Himself	Host; 8 episodes
2005	Commando VIP	Himself	6 episodes
2006	The Dudesons	Himself	1 episode
2007	Bam's Unholy Union	Himself	3 episodes
2007	Crank Yankers	Himself (voice)	Episode 4.6
2008	Jackassworld.com: 24 Hour Takeover	Himself (archived footage)	Television special
2008	Bamimation	Himself (voice)	TV short
2008	Law & Order: Special Victims Unit	Riley Slade	Episode: "Smut"
2010	The Dudesons in America	Himself	Episode: "Winter Games"
2010	Bam's World Domination	Himself	Television special
2010	2010 MTV Video Music Awards	Himself	Presenter
2010	2010 MTV Europe Music Awards	Himself	Presenter
2011	Proving Ground	Himself	Host; 9 episodes
2011	Minute to Win It	Himself	1 episode
2011	Ridiculousness	Himself	1 episode
2011	A Tribute to Ryan Dunn	Himself	Archive footage
2014	CKY: The Greatest Hits	Himself	Archive footage

Video games
Year	Title	Role	Notes
2007	Jackass: The Game	Himself	Voice

Music videos
Year	Artist	Track	Role	Notes
2002	CKY	"Flesh into Gear"	Himself	
2004	Clutch	"Mob Goes Wild"	Himself	
2006	Chris Pontius	"Karazy"	Himself	
2010	Weezer	"Memories"	Himself	

== Discography ==
- The Alter Boys – The Exotic Sounds of the Alter Boys (2005)
