= Chris Raab =

American television personality

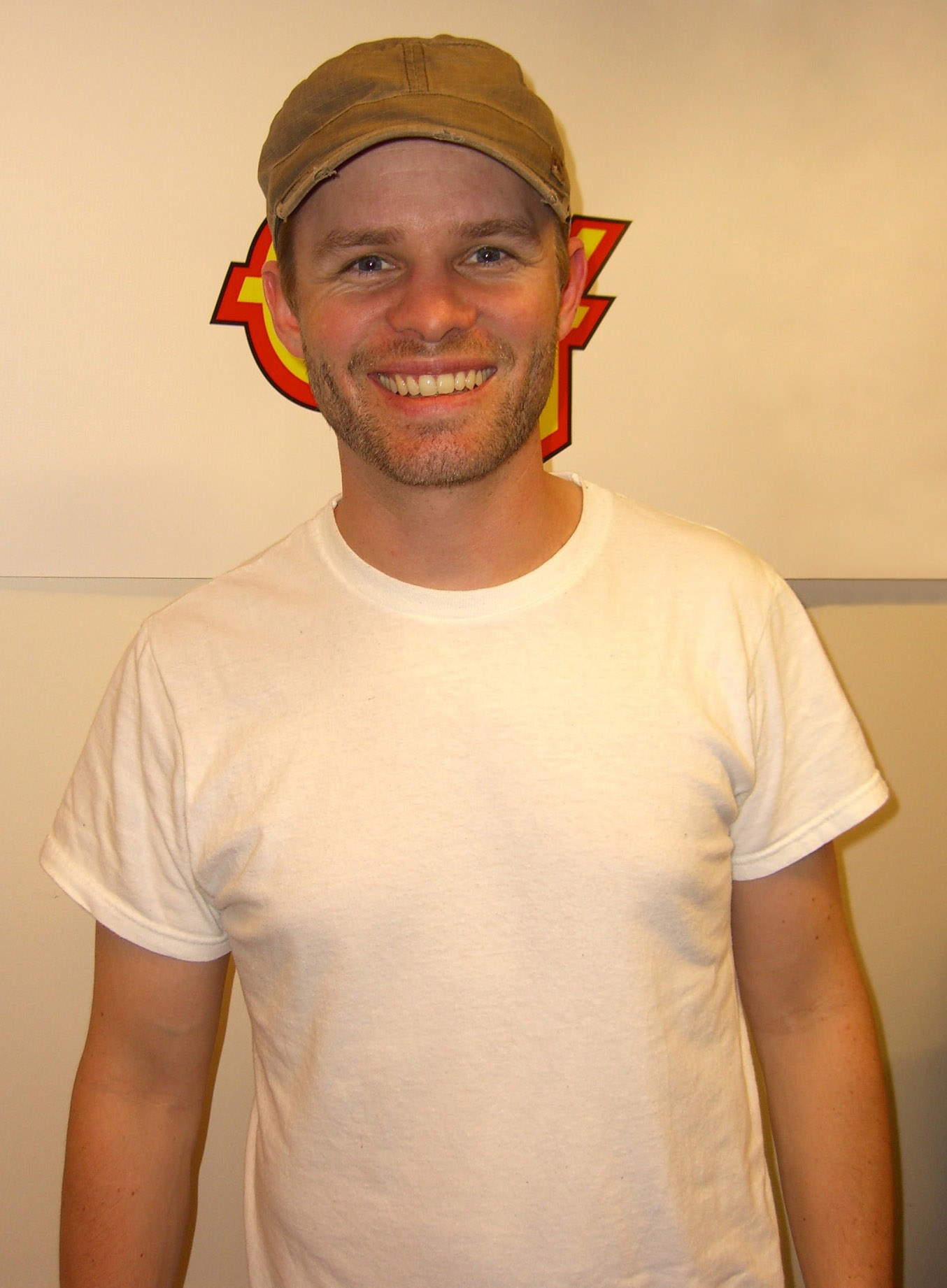
- Raab in 2011
- Born: Christian Joseph Raab; May 21, 1980 (age 46); Willow Grove, Pennsylvania, U.S.
- Other name: Raab Himself
- Education: Shippensburg University of Pennsylvania (B.A.)
- Occupations: Television personality; stunt performer
- Years active: 1999–present
- Known for: CKY; Jackass; Viva La Bam
- Children: 1
- Website: greengateentertainment.com

Christian Joseph Raab (born May 21, 1980), better known by his stage name Raab Himself, is an American television personality and stunt performer known as a former member of the CKY crew featured in the MTV series Viva La Bam and Jackass.

== Biography ==
Raab was born in Willow Grove, Pennsylvania, and grew up in West Chester, Pennsylvania, where he attended West Chester East High School. The nickname "Raab Himself" was bestowed upon him by fellow CKY crew member Chris Aspite. Raab graduated from Shippensburg University of Pennsylvania with a bachelor's degree in communications and journalism.

Raab has battled drug addiction and alcoholism, but said in 2019 that he was approaching a decade of sobriety. In 2018, he launched his own podcast, titled Bathroom Break Podcast. Raab also launched his own video production company named Green Gate Entertainment. Raab and his wife have a child together.

== Filmography ==
=== Films ===
Year	Title	Role	Notes
1999	Landspeed:CKY	Himself	Direct-to-video
2000	CKY2K	Himself	Direct-to-video
2001	CKY3	Himself	Direct-to-video
2001	Don't Try This at Home: The Steve-O Video	Himself	Direct-to-video; Uncredited
2001	CKY Documentary	Himself	Direct-to-video documentary
2002	Jackass: The Movie	Himself	Guest appearance Additional camera
2002	CKY4: The Latest & Greatest	Himself	Direct-to-video
2003	Haggard: The Movie	Raab	
2006	The Dudesons Movie	Himself	Guest appearance
2008	Hotdog Casserole	Himself	Director; Writer; Producer
2009	Skittin Across America	Himself	
2009	Jackass: The Lost Tapes	Himself	Archive footage
2010	The Vampires of Zanzibar	Sire McNugget	
2011	Miss December	Bar Patron	
2011	The Perfect House	Steve	
2013	Jackass Presents: Bad Grandpa		Production assistant
2014	Jackass Presents: Bad Grandpa .5		Production assistant
2014	Borrowed Happiness	Frenchy	Director; Writer; Producer; Editor
2022	Jackass Forever	Himself	Cameo; Camera operator
2022	Jackass 4.5		Camera operator

=== Television ===
Year	Title	Role	Notes
2000–2001	Jackass	Himself	11 episodes Guest appearances
2002	MTV Cribs	Himself	1 episode
2003–2005	Viva La Bam	Himself	43 episodes
2006	The Dudesons	Himself	2 episodes Guest appearances
2011	A Tribute to Ryan Dunn	Himself	TV documentary
2013	The Pitch		Production assistant 3 episodes
2014	Snack-Off		Set production assistant 9 episodes
2014	CKY: The Greatest Hits	Himself	TV special
2017	Epicly Later'd: Bam Margera	Himself	TV documentary
2018	Too Stupid to Die		Cinematographer

=== Web series ===
Year	Title	Role	Notes
2018–present	Bathroom Break Podcast	Himself	Creator; Host
2019	Wikipedia: Fact or Fiction?	Himself	1 episode

=== Music videos ===
Year	Artist	Track	Role	Notes
2002	CKY	"Flesh into Gear"	Himself	
2017	CKY	"Head for a Breakdown"	Himself	Cameo
2019	96 Bitter Beings	"On and On and On"		Director
2022	96 Bitter Beings	"Vaudeville's Revenge"	Grizzled Moonshiner #2	Director; Executive producer
2026	Modest Mouse	"Life's a Dream"		Editor; Co-director
