= Radio Bam =

- Genre: Comedy, talk
- Running time: Mondays; 60 minutes (7:00–8:00 pm)
- Country of origin: United States
- Language: English
- Home station: Sirius XM Satellite Radio
- Hosted by: Bam Margera
- Starring: Bam Margera; Chad I Ginsburg; Brandon Novak; Joe Frantz; Jess Margera; CKY crew
- Created by: Bam Margera
- Recording studio: Castle Bam, West Chester, Pennsylvania
- Original release: November 15, 2004 – February 18, 2013
- No. of episodes: 302
- Audio format: Sirius XM Satellite Radio/ Faction 28

Radio Bam (or Bam Radio) was a SiriusXM radio station hosted by professional skateboarder and Jackass cast member Bam Margera that aired on Mondays at 7 pm, straight after The Jason Ellis Show. The show's supporting cast was originally made up of Margera's fellow CKY crew members Brandon DiCamillo and Brandon Novak, who appeared on most episodes of the show's early years, with frequent guest appearances from Ryan Dunn, Rake Yohn and Chris Raab, as well as Bam's parents April Margera and Phil Margera, uncle Don Vito, and occasional appearances from the Jackass crew.

A recurring feature on the show was DiCamillo's freestyle raps which often poked fun at Rake by insinuating he was gay and the show frequently came under fire for its use of sexist and homophobic language. DiCamillo would also spend entire shows impersonating Rake for episodes where he was not present and the crew would often infuriate Rake by giving out his phone number live on air leading to hundreds of messages being left on his voicemail. The show would often feature lengthy discussions about Novak's most recent sexual conquests and Bam would also take phone calls from listeners calling up to insult the show or the crew in order to mock them on air.

The first two years of the show ran concurrently with Margera's MTV show Viva La Bam and episodes occasionally involved Margera and the crew discussing incidents from previous shows or plans for future episodes. In later years, Bam gradually lost touch with the CKY crew and the show then started to focus on Bam's other friends Chad I Ginsburg, Brandon Novak, and Joe Frantz, with occasional appearances from Dunn and Bam's brother Jess Margera.

On one occasion of Radio Bam, Margera left the show early after the arrest of his uncle Don Vito, saying "Fuck America", and saying he would run to Kazakhstan to "get away from this fucked up ass country". For one episode in 2009, Bam spent the entire hour talking with Ginsburg about his recent stint in rehab for alcohol abuse. On June 20, 2011, a special tribute episode was aired in memory of Ryan Dunn, who died early Monday morning, airing the best moments with Dunn.

On episode #120, Radio Bam was taken off the air after a conversation got out of control. On episode #143, Brandon Novak was kicked out of Bam's studio and sent home to Baltimore, Maryland, after they found drugs on him.

Since February 18, 2013, there have been no new episodes of the show, leading to the belief the show had been canceled. This was later confirmed by Jess Margera on the official CKY band website.

== Key presenters ==
- Bam Margera (2004–2013)
- Jess Margera (2004–2008; 2009–2013 guest)
- Brandon DiCamillo (2004–2007)
- Brandon Novak (2004–2013)
- Joe Frantz (2004–2011; 2011 guest)
- Rake Yohn (2004–2007)
- Chad I Ginsburg (2004–2006 guest) (operated soundboard 2007–2012)

=== Guests ===
- Ryan Dunn
- Chris Raab
- April Margera and Phil Margera
- Don Vito
- Missy Margera
- Matt "Shitbirdz" Cole
- Ryan Gee
- Deron Miller
- Tony Hawk
- Ville Valo
- Steve-O
- Johnny Knoxville
- Preston Lacy
- Chris Pontius
- Tammy Palumbo
- Ryan Cleveland

=== Main crew departs ===
After Margera had multiple falling outs with members of the original CKY crew, the shows lineup became more about Margera and less about the original crew. He continued to feature new guest hosts post-CKY crew. These Included:

- Brandon Novak
- Chad I Ginsburg
- Geoff "Red Mohawk" Blake
- Louie Kovatch
- Production 13 (Kurt Rentz)
- Alex Flamsteed
