= Seth Meisterman =

American artist (born 1975)

- Born: Seth William Meisterman; December 7, 1975 (age 50); Philadelphia, Pennsylvania, U.S.
- Other name: Sweetheart
- Occupation: Artist
- Years active: 2002–present
- Known for: Art director for the Jackass movies
- Website: sethmeisterman.com

Seth William Meisterman (born December 7, 1975) is an American artist, best known for his work as art director / production designer for the Jackass series of movies.

== Biography ==
Meisterman attended the University of the Arts in Philadelphia, majoring in sculpture / fine arts. He began his career art directing music videos for bands such as HIM, Buffalo Daughter and the Bloodhound Gang. In Bam Margera's reality series Viva La Bam, Meisterman a.k.a. "Sweetheart" can be heard reading the shows warning intro for its "Castle Bam" episode. Meisterman blurred the line between crew and cast, often appearing in the series as himself. He appeared in the episodes "Bam on the River", "Where's Vito", "CKY Challenge" and "Castle Bam". He went on to art direct MTV's Bam's Unholy Union, in which he also appears as himself. He was recruited as art director for the films Jackass Number Two, Jackass 2.5, Jackass 3D and Jackass 3.5. He was a propmaker for Jackass Forever, and Jackass 4.5.

== Works ==
=== Art direction/production design ===
Television

- Viva La Bam (2003-2006)
- Bam's Unholy Union (2007)
- Jackassworld.com: 24 Hour Takeover (2008)
- Nitro Circus (2009)
- The Dudesons in America (1 episode, 2010)
- Bam's World Domination (2010)
- Bam's Bad Ass Game Show (2014)

Films

- Bikini Bandits (2002)
- Jackass Number Two (2006)
- Jackass 2.5 (2007)
- Bam Margera Presents: Where the ♯$&% Is Santa? (2008)
- Minghags (2009)
- Jackass 3D (2010)
- Jackass 3.5 (2011)
- Jackass Forever (2022)
- Jackass 4.5 (2022)

Music videos

- Buffalo Daughter - "Cyclic" (2003)
- HIM - "Solitary Man" (2003)
- HIM - "Buried Alive by Love" (2004)
- 69 Eyes - "Lost Boys" (2004)
- Clutch - "Mob Goes Wild" (2004)
- Bloodhound Gang - "Uhn Tiss Uhn Tiss Uhn Tiss" (2005)
- Bloodhound Gang - "Foxtrot Uniform Charlie Kilo" (2005)
