= Jackass (franchise) =

American reality comedy films and TV show

- Genre: Reality television; Stunt show; Physical comedy; Cringe comedy; Black comedy; Shock humor; Toilet humor; Slapstick; Pranks
- Created by: Jeff Tremaine; Spike Jonze; Johnny Knoxville
- Directed by: Jeff Tremaine
- Starring: Johnny Knoxville; Bam Margera; Chris Pontius; Dave England; Steve-O; Ryan Dunn; Danger Ehren; Preston Lacy; Wee Man; Brandon DiCamillo
- Music by: Dave Roen; Sam Spiegel (season 1)
- Opening theme: "Corona" by Minutemen
- Country of origin: United States
- Original language: English
- No. of seasons: 3
- No. of episodes: 25 (list of episodes)

Production
- Executive producers: Jeff Tremaine; Spike Jonze; Johnny Knoxville
- Producer: Trip Taylor
- Cinematography: Dimitry Elyashkevich
- Editors: Ivan Victor; Kristine Young Gaffney; Mark Hansen
- Camera setup: Single
- Running time: 20–22 minutes
- Production company: Dickhouse Productions

Original release
- Network: MTV
- Release: October 1, 2000 – August 12, 2001

Related
- Big Brother; CKY; Wildboyz; Viva La Bam; Homewrecker; Blastazoid; Dr. Steve-O; Bam's Unholy Union; Bam's World Domination; Bam's Bad Ass Game Show

Jackass (stylized in all lowercase as jackass) is an American reality slapstick comedy franchise originating as a television show created by Jeff Tremaine, Spike Jonze, and Johnny Knoxville. The original series aired for three short seasons on MTV between October 2000 and August 2001, with reruns extending into 2002. It featured a compilation of pain-inducing stunt performances and pranks, with the regular cast entailing Knoxville, Bam Margera, Chris Pontius, Ryan Dunn, Steve-O, Dave England, "Danger Ehren" McGhehey, Jason "Wee Man" Acuña, Preston Lacy and Brandon DiCamillo. After MTV ended Jackass broadcasts in 2002, it grew into a media franchise, which includes the spin-off series Wildboyz, and Viva La Bam; six feature films released by Paramount Pictures, four of which with expanded compilation films; a video game and a mobile game; boxed DVD sets of unreleased footage of the original TV show, a short-lived website featuring blogs and videos, merchandise, and several other videos released by various other means.

The TV show placed 68th on Entertainment Weekly's "New TV Classics" list, and is considered a significant part of 2000s American popular culture and a cult phenomenon among late Generation X and early Millennial audiences.

== History ==
=== Original series ===
==== Origins and casting ====
In the mid 1990s, aspiring actor and writer Johnny Knoxville had moved from Knoxville, Tennessee, to Los Angeles, California, and landed work in commercials in order to support his wife and infant daughter. Among Knoxville's various ideas was to produce and sell a magazine article that involved testing various self-defense equipment on himself as a homage to his hero, gonzo journalist Hunter S. Thompson. Knoxville pitched the story to several magazines, but each publication refused to cover the story due to severe liability concerns. However, in 1996, Knoxville was contacted by Big Brother, a skateboarding magazine for which Jeff Tremaine was an editor, and Tremaine convinced Knoxville to film his article as a stunt. The stunt featured Knoxville testing out pepper spray, a stun gun, a taser, and a .38 caliber gun with a bulletproof vest, with the gun stunt only being included in the Big Brother video entitled Number Two, which also featured an appearance by future Jackass cast member Jason "Wee Man" Acuña. Other major contributors to Big Brother at this time were Chris Pontius and Dave England, who both went on to become part of the Jackass cast; Dimitry Elyashkevich, who became the show's cinematographer; Rick Kosick, who became a cameraman; Sean Cliver, who became the show's main photographer; and Loomis Fall, who made recurring appearances throughout the Jackass TV show and films.

Around this time, up-and-coming professional skateboarder Bam Margera was filming his family and friends from his hometown of West Chester, Pennsylvania. Collectively known as the CKY crew (short for "Camp Kill Yourself"), these home videos were ultimately compiled and released as part of the CKY video series. The videos featured stunts, pranks, and skateboarding with a cast that primarily included Bam, Ryan Dunn, Brandon DiCamillo, Chris "Raab Himself" Raab, Rake Yohn and Margera's family; his mother April, his father Phil, his uncle Vincent "Don Vito", and his older brother and CKY drummer Jess. Like the Big Brother videos, the CKY releases quickly became a cult hit and attracted the attention of Tremaine, who saw the second CKY video, CKY2K, and flew Margera out to Los Angeles to meet with him.

The video convinced Tremaine that the CKY group would fit perfectly with the idea of a stunt and prank television show that he, Knoxville, and Spike Jonze had been planning. After demo footage had been shot and pitched to several networks, Saturday Night Live made an offer to have the Knoxville be a recurring segment on the show instead. He rejected the offer, however, and a subsequent bidding war between Comedy Central, FX, and MTV resulted in the creators accepting a deal from the latter for a half-hour weekly show and greater creative control. Knoxville, Tremaine, and Jonze are credited as executive producers of the series. Van Toffler, president of MTV, said: "We just knew there were a bunch of knuckleheads out there who had a very high tolerance for stupidity and pain."

Soon after the MTV deal, Tremaine got in touch with periodic contributor to Big Brother Steve-O, who was working as a clown at a local Florida flea market, and had him film various stunts for the television show. However, none of the stunts were cleared by MTV management due to their graphic and suggestive nature. Some time later, Dave England suggested and brought in his friend "Danger Ehren" McGhehey, a fellow Oregon resident and extreme stunt participant. Preston Lacy would be the last of the original cast to join, after he and Knoxville previously worked together with Knoxville's ex-wife's clothing line. Knoxville told Lacy that he was making a new TV show and asked him if he could potentially write some ideas. Knoxville then convinced Lacy to perform the stunts himself. The main cast would then consist of Knoxville, Margera, Steve-O, Pontius, Dunn, Wee Man, England, Danger Ehren, Lacy and DiCamillo. DiCamillo would leave the main cast after the finale of the series, but would still appear in future films as a guest. Stephanie Hodge was initially intended to be part of the main cast, but withdrew after suffering an injury while filming a stunt that almost left her paralyzed; Knoxville admitted becoming reluctant involving women after the accident.

The skull-and-crutches logo was designed by Andy Jenkins, while the theme song "Corona" by Minutemen was picked by Knoxville. Tremaine and Knoxville originally toyed with the idea of a more talk show-like format with Knoxville as the host behind a desk, but Jonze persuaded them to stick to clip show format of the Big Brother videos. The series typography, using only minimalist lower case Helvetica titles and nothing else—a choice Tremaine attributed to it being a stock font on the Macintosh—was also reused from the Big Brother videos, and was chosen as an "anti-design" choice in face of MTV's elaborate motion graphics at the time.

After Tremaine, Knoxville, and Jonze established Dickhouse Productions, a former Viacom company (now owned by Paramount Skydance), Jackass officially debuted on October 1, 2000, on MTV. After the airing of the second episode, MTV gained its highest Sunday ratings in its history, drawing 2.4 million viewers among 12- to 34-year-olds, its target demographic.

==== Finale ====
In a 2001 interview with Rolling Stone, Knoxville questioned how long the MTV show would and could last, and soon after announced that the series would end after its third season aired. Knoxville also expressed discontentment with MTV and its standards and practices department, who, from the beginning of season two, increasingly gave notes to the Jackass crew regarding what the show could and could not depict. In addition, Steve-O claimed that the cast salaries paid by MTV were "meager at best". Because of the various problems with MTV, the Jackass crew did not attempt to create a finale to bring the show to a close.

==== Spin-offs and careers after the original series ====
After the TV series ended, each member of the cast found new work in movies and/or television, each achieving their own degree of success. Johnny Knoxville pursued a career as an actor, appearing in such films as the 2004 remake of Walking Tall, The Dukes of Hazzard, Men in Black II, The Ringer, A Dirty Shame, Big Trouble, Coyote Ugly, The Last Stand, Teenage Mutant Ninja Turtles, and Skiptrace.

Bam Margera and the CKY crew were given their own spin-off show by MTV in 2003 called Viva La Bam, which followed Margera and his family, who were often made the victim of the clique's practical jokes. Bam and the crew also hosted a radio show from 2004 until 2013 called Radio Bam on Sirius XM. Margera was also the primary focus of the MTV show Bam's Unholy Union, which followed him and his then-fiancée Missy Rothstein in the run-up to their wedding, while Brandon DiCamillo and Rake Yohn were featured in Blastazoid, a short-lived MTV show about video games.

When Viva La Bam finished its run in 2005, Ryan Dunn, who was part of Bam's CKY crew on Viva La Bam, was given his own MTV show Homewrecker, in which he found revenge for helpless victims of practical jokes by renovating the prankster's room according to the original incident. The show only lasted one season. On June 20, 2011, Dunn was killed in a car crash while driving intoxicated in Pennsylvania.

Chris Pontius and Steve-O were also given their own spin-off show by MTV in 2003 entitled Wildboyz. Unlike Jackass and Viva La Bam, Wildboyz rejected the standard formula of practical jokes and instead featured the two traveling the world in search of wild and exotic animals. Directed by Jackass director Jeff Tremaine, Wildboyz frequently featured guest appearances by fellow Jackasses Johnny Knoxville and Wee Man, as well as recurring Jackass guests Loomis Fall, Manny Puig, Tony Hawk, and Mat Hoffman.

One year after Jackass Number Two was released, Steve-O was given a new spin-off entitled Dr. Steve-O, which premiered in 2007 on the USA Network. The show followed Steve-O acting as a doctor to help men overcome their fears, thus the tagline created by Steve-O, "Turning wussies into men." In every episode, Dr. Steve-O helped three different men, and made them complete three challenges to overcome their fears.

Two days before Jackass 3D premiered in theaters, Bam Margera and Ryan Dunn starred in a half-hour TV special titled Bam's World Domination. In this special, Bam and Dunn, along with pro skateboarder Tim O'Connor, participated in the Tough Guy Competition. This special aired on SpikeTV.

After Jackass Presents: Bad Grandpa was released, Bam Margera created a new spin-off entitled Bam's Bad Ass Game Show, which aired on TBS in 2014. Bam hosted this game show, along with co-hosts Brandon Novak, Tim O'Connor, and Seth Meisterman, in which contestants were instructed to perform a series of stunts while competing against each other, in the hopes of winning the grand prize of $10,000.

Former Jackass and CKY crew member Chris Raab started and hosted his own podcast titled Bathroom Break Podcast. The first episode was released on August 18, 2018. Raab has interviewed every original Jackass cast member and every main CKY crew member, with the exception of Johnny Knoxville and Brandon DiCamillo. The final episode of the podcast was released on November 5, 2019. The podcast officially returned on July 6, 2026, with professional skateboarder Mike Maldonado as guest.

Steve-O would also start his own podcast entitled Wild Ride! with Steve-O, which he hosts along with co-hosts Scott Randolph, Paul Brisske, and Vinny Imperati. The first episode was released on March 17, 2020, featuring skateboarder Tony Hawk as a guest. Steve-O has since interviewed most Jackass cast members, as well as many other celebrities.

After the release of Jackass: Best and Last (2026), new Jackass members Poopies and Zach Holmes will have their own show, titled Sports Hurts. The show will feature Poopies and Zach, along with Khyler Vick, and Houston Jones experiencing the most painful moments in sports. It will feature guest appearances by multiple athletes including; skateboarder Ryan Sheckler, wrestler and MMA fighter Rampage Jackson, wrestler Kurt Angle, and American football player Cam Newton. It is set to release on Amazon Prime Video in October 2026.

=== Films ===
==== Jackass: The Movie (2002) ====
After the show went off the air in 2001, the cast reunited in 2002 to film what they believed would be the finale of Jackass: a full-length motion picture version of the show entitled Jackass: The Movie. The cast made it clear that the film was their "farewell" to the fans of the show, and with the franchise taking the movie format, the cast and crew were now allowed to circumvent the censors, showing more vulgar stunts than the ones featured on the TV show. Despite earlier disagreements, MTV Films assisted in the film's distribution.

The film, shot on a budget of just $5 million, went on to gross over $60 million in the United States alone, and finished in the #1 spot at the box office during its debut weekend.

==== Jackass Number Two (2006) ====
With the release of Jackass: The Movie, director Tremaine and the rest of the cast believed that Jackass was finished, and there would be no further projects under the franchise. However, during the final season of Wildboyz, Knoxville joined his former castmates Pontius and Steve-O on various expeditions around the world. It was said that Knoxville went so far out during the filming of the show that Tremaine pulled him aside and said "If you're willing to go this all out, why not get all the guys together and shoot another movie?" Knoxville agreed, and with both Viva La Bam and Wildboyz finishing up their runs, the entire cast was available to reunite and film the sequel.

Jackass Number Two was released on September 22, 2006, produced by MTV Films and distributed by Paramount Pictures. As was the case with its predecessor, Jackass Number Two topped the box office in its debut weekend, earning $29.01 million. Footage for several stunts featured Bam Margera's uncle Vincent "Don Vito" Margera, but this was removed from the theatrical and DVD release due to his arrest and conviction on two counts of sexual assault on a minor.

On September 7, 2006, MTV featured a half-hour documentary entitled The Making of Jackass Number Two. When asked if the film meant the end of Jackass, Steve-O jokingly commented that the people who made money from the franchise still wanted more money, hinting that the cast would still continue the franchise in one form or another. At the conclusion of the documentary, Johnny Knoxville reveals that he "had a hard time letting go" because he is "so hooked on doing stunts." Cinematographer Dimitry Elyashkevich confirmed that weeks after the film, Knoxville was so desperate to shoot that he would film himself running into street signs just for the sake of additional footage.

===== Jackass 2.5 (2007) =====
On September 5, 2007, Bam Margera announced the release of Jackass 2.5 on The Howard Stern Show, a compilation film of stunts that, for one reason or another, did not make it into Jackass: Number Two. The DVD was released on December 26, 2007. Special features on the DVD include the making of Jackass 2.5, the making of Jackass: The Game (2007), deleted scenes, and a photo gallery.

==== Jackass Presents: Mat Hoffman's Tribute to Evel Knievel (2008) ====
On May 27, 2008, a direct-to-DVD Jackass film was released by Dickhouse Productions. The film is a tribute to the stuntman Evel Knievel, who died on November 30, 2007, six months before the film's release.

==== Jackass 3D (2010) ====
In an August 2009 interview with The Times-Picayune, Knoxville, on the topic of Steve-O's recovery and rehabilitation, said, "He's taking to sobriety like he took to drugs and alcohol, I'm very proud of him. I think we'll see him doing some stuff here really soon. As a matter of fact, I know we are." He later stated "Something's coming. We're pretty excited." Later, he added, "I think it'll be a big year next year, but I don't want to talk about it yet."

In September 2009, Margera revealed to Iltalehti, a Finnish newspaper, that Jackass 3 would begin filming in places like Mongolia, South Africa and Finland as well as the United States beginning in January 2010. He then confirmed it again during a broadcast of Radio Bam on September 21, 2009. In early December, Knoxville confirmed that Jackass 3 was being made. In April 2010, a brief blurb about Jackass 3D, titled "gone filmin'", appeared on the jackassworld website. It went on to state: "Thanks for the support the past two years. To keep abreast and adick of all things related to the world of jackass and Dickhouse (including the currently in production flick Jackass 3D), follow us on Facebook and Twitter."

In late July 2010, Paramount and MTV screened the first footage from Jackass 3D at a special event during Comic-Con 2010 in its 3D format. The event allowed fans to meet the Jackass crew. A month later, in August 2010, the official trailer was aired on MTV.

Jackass 3D was released in American movie theaters on October 15, 2010. On its opening weekend, the movie made an estimated $50 million in 3,081 theaters, outperforming predictions it would earn $30 million and breaking the record for the most successful fall opening ever, which was previously held by Scary Movie 3. Jackass 3D would be the final movie to feature primary cast member Ryan Dunn, who died in 2011.

===== Jackass 3.5 (2011) =====
Jackass 3.5 was released in June 2011 with unused footage shot during the filming of Jackass 3D. The first trailer was released online on January 27, 2011, and the feature-length movie was released on VOD and DVD on June 14, 2011, and the entire film was streamed in weekly segments on Joost, starting April 1, 2011.

==== Jackass Presents: Bad Grandpa (2013) ====
In March 2012, Knoxville discussed the possibility of a fourth film, saying "we're keeping our mind open" and "I've got 50–60 ideas on top of all the stuff we didn't get to shoot." Then in June 2012, it was reported Paramount had "registered several domains for a film that would be called Bad Grandpa."

During Margera's September 18, 2012, interview on The Howard Stern Show about Jackass, he said: "There's going to be a whole movie about Knoxville's grandpa character."

Bad Grandpa was officially announced in July 2013 and released on October 25, 2013, exactly 11 years after the release of Jackass: The Movie. It was the first film in the series to be nominated for an Academy Award; it lost the Best Makeup and Hairstyling award to Dallas Buyers Club.

==== Jackass Presents: Bad Grandpa.5 (2014) ====
Jackass Presents: Bad Grandpa.5 is a version of Bad Grandpa that adds over 40 minutes of unused footage, additional outtakes, and interviews. It premiered June 15, 2014 on MTV, and was released on DVD and Blu-ray July 8, 2014.

==== Jackass Forever (2022) ====
In a 2018 interview, Knoxville said that he was open to making a fourth Jackass film that may feature some new cast members, "just to bring in some fresh blood into it." He said that he had continued to write ideas for a Jackass film and that "a ton" have been set aside should the project receive the green-light. The cast members would be consisting of Sean "Poopies" Mcinerney, Zach Holmes, Jasper Dolphin, Rachel Wolfson and Eric Manaka. In July 2019, recurring cast member Chris Raab said that he had interviewed the Jackass crew on his Bathroom Break podcast and noted that everyone was still open to a fourth film should Knoxville, Tremaine, and Spike Jonze agree. Bam Margera was not credited as primary cast member as he was fired during production, appearing in only one skit.

On December 19, 2019, Paramount confirmed that a fourth Jackass film was set for production and scheduled for release on March 5, 2021. In April 2020, the film's release date was rescheduled to July 2, 2021. In July 2020, due to the ongoing COVID-19 pandemic, the film was rescheduled once again to September 3, 2021. In April 2021, Paramount in a major reshuffle, moved the release date again to October 22, 2021. Principal photography started on March 3, 2020, and shut down on March 15, 2020, because of the COVID-19 pandemic. Filming resumed 7 months later on October 19, 2020. Paramount officially released the movie in the United States on February 4, 2022.

===== Jackass 4.5 (2022) =====
Jackass 4.5 is compiled from outtakes, behind-the-scenes footage, and unused material shot during the filming of Jackass Forever, along with later interviews with the cast and crew members. It was released on Netflix on May 20, 2022.

==== Jackass: Best and Last (2026) ====
On 6 November 2025, Steve-O said that they had a number of Zoom calls to discuss the 25th anniversary of Jackass. "What we landed on was a bit more ambitious than timely, but this next year, we're likely to see the Jackass franchise rear its ugly head", he said.

A fifth Jackass movie was officially announced by Johnny Knoxville on January 8, 2026, via Instagram, confirming a theatrical release date on June 26, 2026. Steve-O said the movie will be a mix of old and new footage, and will serve as a celebration of the franchise, bringing back the biggest stunts and pranks from the franchise, as well as brand new ones, and never-before-seen footage.

Bam Margera, who was fired from the production of Jackass Forever (2022), only appears in the movie through archived footage. Margera himself later said that he chose not to participate in filming new scenes for the upcoming film, but gave them permission to use old footage. Eric Manaka, who was a new cast member in Jackass Forever, and Jackass 4.5 (2022), also did not appear in any new footage, while new cast member Jasper Dolphin's father Compston "Dark Shark" Wilson, who made recurring guest appearances in Jackass Forever, and Jackass 4.5, was a main cast member in this movie.

Principal photography started in late February 2026, with the entire main cast of Jackass Forever returning, except for Eric Manaka.

Knoxville said this is the last Jackass film. "This is the natural place to end", he said. He also said that this movie will not have a .5 sequel, making this the second Jackass film without a .5 version, after Jackass: The Movie (2002).

=== Television specials ===
==== Jackass Backyard BBQ (2002) ====
Jackass Backyard BBQ is a TV special that features the entire Jackass cast promoting the first Jackass movie. Dave England did not appear in this special, but archival footage of him is shown. It features celebrity guest appearances from Eric Koston, Tré Cool, Andrew W.K., Slash, Rivers Cuomo, Lara Flynn Boyle, and Danny Masterson. It premiered on MTV in July 2002.

==== Jackassworld.com: 24 Hour Takeover (2008) ====
On February 23, 2008, MTV held the TV special, Jackassworld.com: 24 Hour Takeover, to coincide with the official launch of Jackassworld.com. The special allowed the core members of Jackass to take over MTV and its studios for 24 hours, broadcasting new pranks and stunts, along with a tribute to stunt man Evel Knievel shot days before.

==== Steve-O: Demise and Rise (2009) ====
On May 3, 2009, MTV premiered a documentary titled Steve-O: Demise and Rise about how his life was affected by the use of drugs and alcohol. The documentary was directed by Jackass cinematographer Dimitry Elyashkevich. The show featured home-made video footage of Steve-O using drugs and vandalizing his apartment. In an August 2009 interview with Johnny Knoxville for The Times-Picayune, Knoxville on the topic of Steve-O's recovery and rehabilitation said "He's taking to sobriety like he took to drugs and alcohol, I'm very proud of him. I think we'll see him doing some stuff here really soon. As a matter of fact, I know we are."

==== A Tribute to Ryan Dunn (2011) ====
A Tribute to Ryan Dunn is a TV movie documentary which aired on November 28, 2011. The film chronicles the life of former cast member Ryan Dunn, who died on June 20, 2011. It features interviews from Dunn's family members, the Jackass cast and crew, and some of the CKY crew members. Never-before-released footage of Dunn was also shown in this documentary.

==== Jackass Shark Week (2021 & 2022) ====
On July 11, 2021, during Shark Week, the Discovery Channel aired Jackass Shark Week. It featured Jackass cast members Johnny Knoxville, Steve-O, Chris Pontius, and new cast members Sean "Poopies" McInerney and Jasper Dolphin, with Jeff Tremaine and Trip Taylor serving as executive producers, and Dimitry Elyashkevich as camera operator. This Shark Week episode marks the first time someone ever got bit on the show.

On June 15, 2022, Chris Pontius announced that they will be doing another Jackass Shark Week special. It featured Johnny Knoxville, Chris Pontius, Wee Man, Poopies, Zach Holmes, Jasper, and his father Compston "Dark Shark" Wilson. It aired on July 24, 2022, on the Discovery Channel.

== Cast and crew ==
=== Cast ===
*appears but not as main cast

Cast members	Television series	Films					Television specials			Spin-off films	
Cast members	Jackass	Jackass: The Movie	Jackass Number Two Jackass 2.5	Jackass 3D Jackass 3.5	Jackass Forever Jackass 4.5	Jackass: Best and Last	Jackassworld.com: 24 Hour Takeover	Jackass Shark Week	Jackass Shark Week 2.0	Jackass Presents: Mat Hoffman's Tribute to Evel Knievel	Jackass Presents: Bad Grandpa Jackass Presents: Bad Grandpa .5
Cast members	2000–2001	2002	2006–2007	2010–2011	2022	2026	2008	2021	2022	2008	2013–2014
Main cast
Johnny Knoxville	Yes	Yes	Yes	Yes	Yes	Yes	Yes	Yes	Yes	Yes	Yes
Bam Margera	Yes	Yes	Yes	Yes	Yes *		Yes				
Steve-O	Yes	Yes	Yes	Yes	Yes	Yes	Yes	Yes			
Chris Pontius	Yes	Yes	Yes	Yes	Yes	Yes	Yes	Yes	Yes		
Ryan Dunn	Yes	Yes	Yes	Yes							
Dave England	Yes	Yes	Yes	Yes	Yes	Yes	Yes				
Jason "Wee Man" Acuña	Yes	Yes	Yes	Yes	Yes	Yes	Yes		Yes		
"Danger Ehren" McGhehey	Yes	Yes	Yes	Yes	Yes	Yes	Yes				
Preston Lacy	Yes	Yes	Yes	Yes	Yes	Yes	Yes				
Brandon DiCamillo	Yes	Yes *	Yes *								
Sean "Poopies" McInerney					Yes	Yes		Yes	Yes		
Jasper Dolphin					Yes	Yes		Yes	Yes		
Zach Holmes					Yes	Yes			Yes		
Rachel Wolfson					Yes	Yes					
Eric Manaka					Yes						
Compston “Dark Shark" Wilson					Yes *	Yes			Yes *		
Supporting crew
Jeff Tremaine	Yes	Yes	Yes	Yes	Yes	Yes	Yes	Yes	Yes	Yes	Yes
Spike Jonze	Yes	Yes	Yes	Yes	Yes	Yes				Yes	Yes
Dimitry Elyashkevich	Yes	Yes	Yes	Yes	Yes	Yes	Yes	Yes	Yes	Yes	Yes
Sean Cliver	Yes	Yes	Yes	Yes	Yes	Yes	Yes		Yes		Yes
Rick Kosick	Yes	Yes	Yes	Yes	Yes	Yes	Yes		Yes	Yes	Yes
Lance Bangs	Yes	Yes	Yes	Yes	Yes	Yes	Yes				Yes
Greg "Guch" Iguchi	Yes	Yes	Yes	Yes	Yes	Yes			Yes	Yes	Yes
Trip Taylor	Yes	Yes	Yes	Yes	Yes	Yes	Yes	Yes	Yes	Yes	Yes
Cordell Mansfield	Yes	Yes	Yes	Yes	Yes	Yes			Yes		Yes
Ben "Benzo" Kaller	Yes	Yes	Yes	Yes	Yes	Yes	Yes				
Joe Frantz	Yes		Yes	Yes			Yes				
Shanna Zablow Newton	Yes		Yes	Yes	Yes	Yes	Yes	Yes	Yes		Yes
Knate Lee	Yes	Yes	Yes	Yes	Yes	Yes					Yes
Greg Wolf	Yes	Yes	Yes	Yes		Yes	Yes				Yes
Derek Freda	Yes	Yes	Yes	Yes							Yes
J.P. Blackmon	Yes	Yes	Yes	Yes	Yes	Yes	Yes				Yes
Seth Meisterman			Yes	Yes	Yes	Yes	Yes				Yes
Sam Spiegel	Yes	Yes	Yes	Yes							Yes
Roger Alan Wade		Yes	Yes	Yes	Yes	Yes					Yes
CKY	Yes	Yes		Yes							
Seamus Frawley			Yes	Yes	Yes	Yes					Yes
Matthew Kosinski			Yes	Yes	Yes	Yes			Yes		Yes
Scott Manning			Yes	Yes	Yes	Yes	Yes				
Rob "Whitey" McConnaughy	Yes	Yes	Yes	Yes							
Tony Gardner	Yes	Yes	Yes	Yes	Yes	Yes					Yes
Matthew Probst			Yes	Yes	Yes						Yes
Mark Rackley	Yes	Yes	Yes				Yes				
Van Toffler			Yes	Yes		Yes					
Recurring appearances
Loomis Fall	Yes	Yes	Yes	Yes		Yes	Yes				
Chris "Raab Himself" Raab	Yes	Yes			Yes						Yes
Rake Yohn	Yes	Yes	Yes	Yes							
Brandon Novak			Yes	Yes							
April Margera	Yes	Yes	Yes	Yes			Yes				
Phil Margera	Yes	Yes	Yes	Yes			Yes				
Jess Margera	Yes	Yes	Yes	Yes			Yes				
Manny Puig	Yes	Yes	Yes	Yes			Yes				
Mike Kassak	Yes	Yes	Yes	Yes	Yes	Yes					Yes
Stephanie Hodge	Yes	Yes	Yes								
Dave Carnie	Yes			Yes			Yes			Yes	
Tony Hawk	Yes	Yes	Yes	Yes	Yes						
Mat Hoffman	Yes	Yes	Yes	Yes			Yes			Yes	
Parks Bonifay		Yes		Yes	Yes						
Eric Koston		Yes		Yes							
Clyde Singleton	Yes	Yes	Yes								
Jason "J2" Rasmus	Yes	Yes									
Rip Taylor		Yes	Yes	Yes							
Jules Sylvester				Yes	Yes						
David Weathers			Yes	Yes							
Gary Leffew	Yes	Yes	Yes	Yes	Yes						
Jack Polick	Yes	Yes	Yes	Yes							Yes
Tory Belleci					Yes	Yes					

=== Crew ===
Film	Director	Screenwriter(s)		Producer(s)
Film	Director	Main writers	Co-writers	Producer(s)
Jackass: The Movie (2002)	Jeff Tremaine	Jeff Tremaine, Spike Jonze, Johnny Knoxville, Bam Margera, Steve-O, Preston Lacy, Chris Pontius, Wee Man, Dave England, Ryan Dunn and Danger Ehren	Brandon DiCamillo, Dimitry Elyashkevich, Rob "Whitey" McConnaughy, Sean Cliver, Loomis Fall, Tim Payne, Anne Zogby, Phil Clapp, and Vernon Chatman	Jeff Tremaine, Spike Jonze, and Johnny Knoxville
Jackass Number Two (2006)	Jeff Tremaine	Jeff Tremaine, Spike Jonze, Johnny Knoxville, Bam Margera, Steve-O, Preston Lacy, Chris Pontius, Wee Man, Dave England, Ryan Dunn and Danger Ehren	Mark Lewman, Dimitry Elyashkevich, Al Walker, Brandon DiCamillo, Darrin Prescott, David Weathers, Gary Leffew, Jeffrey Ross, Juicy J, DJ Paul, Project Pat, Loomis Fall, Scott Rogers, Sean Cliver, Thor Drake, and Rob "Whitey" McConnaughy	Jeff Tremaine, Spike Jonze, and Johnny Knoxville
Jackass 3D (2010)	Jeff Tremaine	Jeff Tremaine, Spike Jonze, Johnny Knoxville, Bam Margera, Steve-O, Preston Lacy, Chris Pontius, Wee Man, Dave England, Ryan Dunn and Danger Ehren	Loomis Fall, Barry Owen Smoler, The Dudesons, Dave Carnie, Mike Kassak, Madison Clapp, Knate Gwaltney, Derek Freda, Trip Taylor, Sean Cliver, Dimitry Elyashkevich, J.P. Blackmon, and Rick Kosick	Jeff Tremaine, Spike Jonze, and Johnny Knoxville
Jackass Presents: Bad Grandpa (2013)	Jeff Tremaine	Screenplay by: Johnny Knoxville, Spike Jonze and Jeff Tremaine; Story by: Fax Bahr, Spike Jonze, Johnny Knoxville, Adam Small and Jeff Tremaine		Johnny Knoxville, Spike Jonze, Derek Freda, and Jeff Tremaine
Jackass Forever (2022)	Jeff Tremaine	Jeff Tremaine, Spike Jonze, Johnny Knoxville, Steve-O, Preston Lacy, Chris Pontius, Wee Man, Dave England, Danger Ehren, Poopies, Jasper, Zach Holmes, Rachel Wolfson, and Eric Manaka	Dimitry Elyashkevich, Sean Cliver, Trip Taylor, Andrew Weinberg, Colton Dunn, Knate Lee, Derrick Beckles, Eric André, Sarah Sherman, and Nick Kreiss	Jeff Tremaine, Spike Jonze, and Johnny Knoxville
Jackass: Best and Last (2026)	Jeff Tremaine	Jeff Tremaine, Spike Jonze, Johnny Knoxville, Steve-O, Preston Lacy, Chris Pontius, Wee Man, Dave England, Danger Ehren, Poopies, Jasper, Zach Holmes, Rachel Wolfson and Dark Shark	Dimitry Elyashkevich, Sean Cliver, Trip Taylor, Rick Kosick, Knate Lee, J.P. Blackmon, and Tory Belleci	Jeff Tremaine, Spike Jonze, and Johnny Knoxville

== Controversies ==
At the time of its first broadcast in 2000, Jackass frequently featured warnings and disclaimers noting that the stunts performed were very dangerous and should not be imitated, while also advising viewers that any stunt video footage sent to the production company would not be opened or viewed. Such warnings not only appeared before and after each episode and after each commercial break, but also in a "crawl" that ran along the bottom of the screen during some especially risky stunts, while also showing the show's signature "skull and crutches" logo at the bottom right of the screen to symbolize the stunt performed as risky. Nevertheless, the program inspired at least one instance of teens imitating a stunt with fatal results.

On February 7, 2001, Joe Lieberman, a Connecticut senator and the vice presidential candidate for the Democratic Party in the 2000 presidential election, sent a letter to MTV's parent company Viacom urging the company to take greater responsibility for its programming and to do more to help parents protect their children. MTV responded to the criticism by canceling all airings of Jackass before 10 p.m.; however, Lieberman's continual campaign against the show led to MTV ultimately refusing to air reruns of the later episodes, a move which angered the cast and production crew of the series who were furious with MTV "caving into Lieberman's demands".

In 2002, a Montana man named Jack Ass sued MTV for $10 million, claiming that the show was plagiarizing his name. Jack Ass, whose birth name was Bob Craft (died 2003), officially changed his name in 1997 to raise awareness for drunk driving, after his brother and friend were killed in a car accident. Johnny Knoxville rebuffed the lawsuit stating, "What could be more American than just suing the living shit out of someone for no reason at all?"

The same year, a woman named Wendy Linden sued MTV after she participated in a town hall meeting with the cast and got injured when she got tackled by Dave England. England issued a public apology in response.

On November 23, 2012, Matt-Dillion Shannon, an 18-year-old from Napier, New Zealand, was sentenced to three years in prison on a charge of causing grievous bodily harm for his role in the August 2011 dousing of a 16-year-old with gasoline and setting him on fire. Shannon's lawyer claimed that this act was inspired by the Jackass series. Johnny Knoxville volunteered to be lit on fire in Season 1, Episode 3, of the original series in a segment called "Up In Flames", which originally aired on October 15, 2000.

== Home media ==
On December 6, 2005, MTV released a four-disc DVD collection entitled Jackass: The Box Set. This set does not contain the three complete seasons as they originally aired, but rather compilations of various stunts from all three seasons, arranged into 3 volumes. There are also additional features included, such as a commentary track by the cast and crew for numerous stunts. The fourth disc includes additional bonus material, such as the crew's trip to the Gumball 3000 rally (The only 1-hour long episode in the show's history); a special "Where Are They Now?" documentary; MTV Cribs: Jackass Edition, which is an entire episode of Cribs spotlighting Chris Pontius, Steve-O, Bam Margera, and Ryan Dunn; as well as appearances by the crew at the 2002 MTV Video Music Awards and the 2002 MTV Latin America Video Music Awards. The set also contains a 48-page collector's booklet which includes rare photos and covers the history of the show, as well as various inside stories of certain stunts and moments from the show.

The second and third volumes of this box set had previously been released separately on December 10, 2002, two months after Jackass: The Movie was released in theaters. The first volume was released by itself on January 23, 2006. The fourth "bonus disc" has never been released separately.

Another compilation of stunts from the television series was released on October 11, 2009, entitled Jackass: The Lost Tapes. Again being arranged into individual segments rather than episodes, this collection features all the remaining stunts from the show that weren't included in the original box set, such as "Self Defense Test"; "Stun Collar"; "Fast Food Football"; "Roller Jump"; and "Satan vs. God". In addition to the previously unreleased segments, this collection also includes stunts that were filmed for the TV series, but never aired, primarily due to censorship reasons. The DVD's bonus features include the original cold opens from every televised episode of Jackass, the original credit montages from each televised episode, and an inside look at the short-lived website jackassworld.com, featuring various skits.

Beginning in 2013, various other box sets have been released in the USA and UK that combine the original box set, with or without the bonus disc (Gumball Rally 3000, etc), with the lost tapes disc, and often with all the movies released up to that point (5 or 7), in their unrated expanded versions.

== Reception ==
=== Box office performance ===
Film	Release date	Box office gross			Budget	Ref(s)
Film	Release date	North America	Other territories	Worldwide	Budget	Ref(s)
Jackass: The Movie	October 25, 2002	$64,255,312	$15,238,519	$79,493,831	$5 million	
Jackass Number Two	September 22, 2006	$72,778,712	$11,839,820	$84,618,532	$11.5 million	
Jackass 3D	October 15, 2010	$117,229,692	$54,456,100	$171,685,792	$20 million	
Jackass Presents: Bad Grandpa	October 25, 2013	$102,003,019	$49,828,518	$151,831,537	$15 million	
Jackass Forever	February 4, 2022	$57,743,451	$22,820,548	$80,563,999	$10 million	
Jackass: Best and Last	June 26, 2026	$18,273,185	$9,522,070	$27,795,255	$10 million	
Total		$432,283,371	$163,705,575	$595,988,946	$71.5 million	
List indicator: A dark grey cell indicates information is not available for the film.

=== Critical and public response ===
Film	Rotten Tomatoes	Metacritic	CinemaScore
Jackass: The Movie	49% (92 reviews)	42 (14 reviews)	A−
Jackass Number Two	66% (101 reviews)	66 (23 reviews)	B+
Jackass 3D	67% (111 reviews)	56 (23 reviews)	B+
Jackass Presents: Bad Grandpa	61% (109 reviews)	54 (29 reviews)	B
Jackass Forever	86% (172 reviews)	74 (39 reviews)	B+
Jackass: Best and Last	87% (60 reviews)	63 (29 reviews)	A−

== Legacy ==
Japanese game developer Goichi Suda (aka SUDA 51) is a fan of Jackass. The main character of the 2007 No More Heroes video game, Travis Touchdown, was inspired by Johnny Knoxville.

== Other media ==
=== Video games ===
==== Jackass: The Game (2007) ====
Jackass: The Game was released on September 24, 2007. It was developed under a license by Sidhe Interactive in Wellington, New Zealand, for the PlayStation 2, PlayStation Portable and Nintendo DS. The game was first shown at the 2006 E3 behind closed doors. It is mentioned in the Jackass Number Two commentary: when discussing the stunt where several members get punched in the face by a spring-loaded boxing glove hidden behind a fake valentine on a wall, the commentator says the cast members had just come upstairs from shooting a promo for the video game. Knoxville and other members of the Jackass team also provided stunt ideas to the developer based on unused stunts from the show. A trailer and the cover art was released in June 2007 on the game's official website. All main characters of the show were featured as playable, except for Bam Margera, whose contractual obligations to Neversoft, makers of the Tony Hawk's franchise, prevented him from appearing in any other video game.

==== Jackass Human Slingshot (2022) ====
Jackass Human Slingshot is a mobile game available on Android and iOS, and was released on January 20, 2022. In this game, the player controls Johnny Knoxville, who gets launched from a slingshot to get as many injuries as possible in order to progress. The game was developed by BBTV Interactive.

=== Trading cards ===
==== 2022 Zerocool Jackass Trading Cards ====
After Jackass Forever premiered in 2022, a Jackass trading card set was released. The set featured autographs of the Jackass Forever cast and crew, and several Jackass Forever guest stars. This set was unique in the sense that special numbered insert cards were given only to cast and crew members, so there was no way to get these extremely rare cards directly from boxes. The only way to get one was directly from one of the cast or crew members.

=== Podcast ===
==== Jackass: The Podcast (2026) ====
Jackass: The Podcast is an official Jackass podcast, hosted by Johnny Knoxville and Jeff Tremaine, with frequent guest appearances from the Jackass cast and main crew members. The first episode released on June 18, 2026.

== Related films ==
=== CKY (1999–2002) ===
The CKY video series is a series of videos produced by Bam Margera and Brandon DiCamillo and other residents of West Chester, Pennsylvania. "CKY" stands for "Camp Kill Yourself". The series was part of the basis for what eventually became the Jackass TV series.

=== Don't Try This at Home: The Steve-O Video (2001–2004) ===
Don't Try This at Home: The Steve-O Video is the first DVD by Steve-O, released in 2001. It mostly contains footage that couldn't be shown on related MTV show Jackass, due to censorship. It was followed by Don't Try This at Home Volume 2: The Tour (2002), Steve-O: Out on Bail (2003) and Steve-O: The Early Years (2004). The video series featured recurring guest appearances from the Jackass cast and crew, and from professional skateboarder Ryan Simonetti.

=== Haggard: The Movie (2003) ===
Haggard: The Movie is an independent comedy film based on the story of how Ryan Dunn's girlfriend may have cheated on him. The film was financed, directed, produced, co-written, and edited by Bam Margera. The film stars Ryan Dunn, Jenn Rivell, Brandon DiCamillo, Bam Margera, Rake Yohn, and Raab Himself.

=== National Lampoon's TV: The Movie (2006) ===
National Lampoon's TV: The Movie is a comedy film that was released in 2006 and features several cast members of Jackass including Steve-O, Preston Lacy, Wee Man, Chris Pontius, Ehren McGhehey and recurring Jackass guest Manny Puig. The film features parodies of many television shows, such as Fear Factor, Cops, MTV Cribs, The Six Million Dollar Man and Miami Vice.

=== 3000 Miles (2007) ===
3000 Miles is a documentary in which Bam Margera and Ryan Dunn, along with Tony Hawk, Mike Vallely, Mike Escamilla, and Dan Joyce from Dirty Sanchez, race 3000 miles around the world from London to Los Angeles in 8 days in the Gumball 3000 rally.

=== Bam Margera Presents: Where the #$&% Is Santa? (2008) ===
Bam Margera Presents: Where the #$&% Is Santa? is a direct-to-video film about Bam Margera going on a quest to find Santa Claus with the help from Brandon Novak, his elder brother Jess, Chad I Ginsburg, Mark Hanna, Joe Frantz, Missy Rothstein, his parents Phil and April, Seth Meisterman, and his uncle Matt "Shitbirdz" Cole. Jarppi Leppälä and Jukka Hildén from The Dudesons also appear in this movie. If Bam doesn't succeed to find Santa, Mark the Bagger gets his wife Missy as a Christmas present.

=== Minghags (2009) ===
Minghags is an independent comedy film that was released in 2009. It was directed, co-written, and edited by Bam Margera. It is a loose sequel to Haggard: The Movie. The film stars Bam Margera, Ryan Dunn, Brandon DiCamillo, Don Vito, Rake Yohn, Missy Rothstein, Brandon Novak, Mark the Bagger, Mark Hanna, and Angie Cuturic.

=== Steve-O: Guilty as Charged (2016) ===
Steve-O: Guilty as Charged is Steve-O's first comedy special which was released on March 18, 2016. It features him performing various stunts in front of a live audience in a theatre in Austin, Texas, as well as him telling backstories of his career. This special premiered on Showtime.

=== Action Point (2018) ===
Action Point is a comedy film featuring Jackass cast members Johnny Knoxville and Chris Pontius, and new Jackass member Eric Manaka, released in 2018. Knoxville was inspired to make the film after seeing Matt Robertson's 2013 short documentary The Most Insane Amusement Park Ever, about Action Park, a theme park in New Jersey which was notorious for poorly designed, unsafe rides, in addition to employing underaged, undertrained and often under-the-influence staff. Similar to Bad Grandpa, the film features traditional Jackass-style stunts connected by a fictional narrative.

=== Steve-O: Gnarly (2020) ===
Gnarly is Steve-O's second stand-up comedy special at the Gothic Theatre in Denver, Colorado. He presented stories, stunts and previously unseen footage to the audience. The special marks the first time the entire cast of Jackass reunited after the death of Ryan Dunn. It was released in 2020 and is available to watch on Steve-O's website.

=== Steve-O's Bucket List (2023) ===
In 2021, Steve-O started going on tour throughout the United States. This tour, titled The Bucket List Tour, features Steve-O telling stories and showing stunts that he wasn't allowed to do for Jackass. He occasionally brought other Jackass members as guests for his live shows. He started going to Canada in October 2022, Australia and New Zealand in February 2023, and to the United Kingdom in June and July 2023. It was released on his website on November 14, 2023, making it his third comedy special. Chris Pontius, Dave England, Ehren McGhehey, Preston Lacy, Loomis Fall, and Jeff Tremaine make cameo appearances.

== See also ==
- 1000 Ways to Die – American docufiction anthology television series - 2008–2012 anthology series documenting unusual and peculiar deaths instigated by carelessness or deliberate impulsiveness
- Adrenaline Crew – American stunt team
- Balls of Steel – British television comedy game show (2005–2008)
- Balls of Steel Australia – Australian reality comedy TV series
- Death Wish Live – British live television series
- Dirty Sanchez – British stunt and prank television series
- The Dudesons – Finnish stunt group
- Ed Bassmaster – American YouTuber and television actor
- The Filthy Frank Show – Japanese-Australian musician and comedian (born 1993)
- Half Pint Brawlers – American wrestling company and television series
- Impractical Jokers – American comedy television show
- Jim Rose Circus – Modern-day version of a circus sideshow
- The 11 Commandments (Les 11 commandements) – a 2004 French stunt performance film
- Loiter Squad – American live-action sketch comedy television series
- Mega64 – American satirical comedy troupe
- Nitro Circus – Action sport collective led by Travis Pastrana
- Ogags – Filipino sketch comedy show
- Rad Girls – an American stunt performance crew and series
- Rémi Gaillard – French prankster
- Stankervision – an American reality television
- Tokyo Shock Boys – Japanese stunt performance group
- Too Stupid to Die – an American stunt series sketch comedy show
