= Jackass 3D =

2010 American reality comedy film

- Theatrical release poster
- Directed by: Jeff Tremaine
- Based on: Jackass by: Jeff Tremaine; Spike Jonze; Johnny Knoxville
- Produced by: Jeff Tremaine; Spike Jonze; Johnny Knoxville
- Starring: Johnny Knoxville; Bam Margera; Steve-O; Chris Pontius; Ryan Dunn; Wee Man; Preston Lacy; Dave England; Danger Ehren
- Cinematography: Dimitry Elyashkevich
- Edited by: Seth Casriel; Matthew Probst; Matthew Kosinski
- Music by: Sam Spiegel; Amjad Albasel
- Production companies: MTV Films; Dickhouse Productions
- Distributed by: Paramount Pictures
- Release date: October 15, 2010 (United States)
- Running time: 94 minutes
- Country: United States
- Language: English
- Budget: $20 million
- Box office: $171.7 million

Jackass 3D (known as Jackass 3 on home media) is a 2010 American 3D reality comedy film directed by Jeff Tremaine and produced by Tremaine, Spike Jonze, and Johnny Knoxville. It is the third installment in the Jackass film series, and the sequel to Jackass Number Two (2006).

The film stars the regular Jackass cast of Johnny Knoxville, Bam Margera, Ryan Dunn, Steve-O, Danger Ehren, Dave England, Preston Lacy, Wee Man, and Chris Pontius. This is the last Jackass film to feature Dunn before his death in 2011 and Margera as a primary cast member before his departure in 2020 (Margera is briefly in Jackass Forever). It is also the last Jackass film to feature a guest appearance by Rip Taylor, who died in October 2019.

The film was theatrically released in the United States in the 3D format on October 15, 2010, by Paramount Pictures, marking the tenth anniversary of the Jackass television series. It received generally positive reviews from critics, and grossed $171.7 million worldwide against a production budget of $20 million.

Leftover film footage scenes was incorporated as an extended length feature released as Jackass 3.5 on DVD and Blu-ray on June 14, 2011. A sequel, Jackass Forever, was released 12 years later in 2022 to positive reviews.

== Synopsis ==
Beavis and Butt-Head open the film with a special cameo, and an explanation of 3D technology. In a matter typical for the characters, they start arguing and quickly get into a slap-fight, with several of the moves especially animated to come out of the screen in a 3D setting. The opening sequence features each of the cast members lining up, standing in each color of the rainbow, while an operatic version of the Jackass theme song "Corona" plays. Once Johnny Knoxville introduces the film, each cast member does small stunts by various objects in slow-motion to the tune of "The Kids Are Back" by Twisted Sister. The opening sequence, as well as many of the stunts, were filmed with Phantom high speed cameras, which shoot at 1,000 frames per second.

The most notable stunts and pranks include: Johnny Knoxville being camouflage-painted as a bull charges at him; Bam Margera falling into a pit filled with snakes while attempting to prank director and producer Jeff Tremaine; Ryan Dunn and Steve-O playing instruments while a male sheep rams them; Steve-O drinking Preston Lacy's sweat after riding an elliptical machine; Bam gluing his hands to Preston Lacy and Phil Margera's chest with super glue; Ehren McGhehey getting his crooked tooth pulled by Bam's Lamborghini; Dave England playing tetherball with a beehive against Steve-O; Preston Lacy getting a football kicked into his face by professional NFL kicker Josh Brown; Wee Man participating in a bar brawl with other little people; and Chris Pontius flying an RC helicopter while it is tied to his penis.

The final stunt involves Steve-O being launched high into the air while inside a full port-a-potty connected to bungee cords. The following closing skit is done in a similar fashion as the introduction, as Knoxville announces he's about to "end the movie", then triggers an old-fashioned dynamite plunger; after the rest of the crew is disappointed by the initial explosion being a mere puff of air out of a nearby piñata, everything in the room is destroyed in a series of large explosions, as the blown-up objects are thrown at the cast (like the opening, all shown in slow-motion) to the tune of Pyotr Ilyich Tchaikovsky's 1812 Overture. After the explosions are finished, the cast members are flushed away by a wave pool. As in the past two Jackass films, comedian Rip Taylor makes an appearance before the credits roll, celebrating the end of the film in overly dramatic fashion.

== Cast ==
The entire cast from the previous movies returned for the third movie.

- Johnny Knoxville
- Bam Margera
- Ryan Dunn
- Steve-O
- Jason "Wee Man" Acuña
- Preston Lacy
- Chris Pontius
- "Danger Ehren" McGhehey
- Dave England

=== Guest appearances ===
- Loomis Fall
- Phil Margera, April Margera, and Jess Margera
- Will "The Farter" Bakey
- Brandon Novak
- The Dudesons (Jukka Hildén, Jarppi Leppälä, HP Parviainen, and Jarno Laasala)
- Rake Yohn
- Terra Jolé
- Mike Judge (as the voices of Beavis and Butt-Head, as well as in person during the end credits)
- Will Oldham
- Rip Taylor
- Half Pint Brawlers (Note: Stevie Lee, 54, American professional wrestler and actor (Puppet the Psycho Dwarf, The Babe, Oz the Great and Powerful) who died on September 12, 2020.)
- Animal experts Manny Puig, David Weathers, Jason Deeringer, and Jules Sylvester
- American football players Erik Ainge, Jared Allen, and Josh Brown
- Wheelchair rugby player Mark Zupan
- Extreme sport athletes Mat Hoffman, Tony Hawk, Kerry Getz, Eric Koston, and Parks Bonifay
- Actors Seann William Scott, Edward Barbanell, Jack Polick, John Taylor, Angie Simms, and Dana Michael Woods
- From Nitro Circus; Andy Bell, Erik Roner, and "Streetbike Tommy" Passemante
- From Weezer; Rivers Cuomo, Brian Bell, and Scott Shriner
- Knoxville's daughter Madison, and his son Rocko appear in the end credits

=== Crew ===
Crew members who appear in this movie:

- Director and producer Jeff Tremaine
- Producer Spike Jonze
- Executive producer Trip Taylor
- Associate producer Greg Wolf
- Co-producer and cinematographer Dimitry Elyashkevich
- Co-producer and photographer Sean Cliver
- Cameramen Lance Bangs, Rick Kosick, Rob "Whitey" McConnaughy and Greg "Guch" Iguchi
- Co-producer Knate Lee
- Boom operator Seamus Frawley
- Set decorator Mike Kassak
- Art directors and production designers J.P. Blackmon, and Seth Meisterman

Notable exceptions to the supporting cast are Brandon DiCamillo, who had a falling out with cast member Bam Margera, and Raab Himself, who was recovering from alcoholism and drug addiction.

== Production ==
=== Development ===
In December 2009, director and producer Jeff Tremaine began doing camera tests with the 3D equipment. In that same month, Johnny Knoxville announced the return of the entire cast of the previous two movies. According to Deadline Hollywood, a stunt called "The Heli-cockter" was filmed and shown to Paramount Pictures executives in its 3D format to greenlight the project. Chris Pontius tethered a remote control-operated helicopter to his penis, and grinned while he swung it around.

=== Filming ===
Filming began on January 25, 2010, Tremaine filmed the crew on private property unlike the traditional Jackass fashion of filming in the streets (although in the film, several skits/pranks were shot in public), and it includes "occasional forays to foreign countries."

On the subject of the stunts, director Jeff Tremaine said he was aiming to revamp most of the old stunts from the original show into the movie. For example, the "Poo Cocktail Supreme" is an homage to, and an extension of, the stunt originally done by Knoxville on the original television show. The stunt, "Lamborghini Tooth Pull" was originally shot for Jackass Number Two (2006) with Margera's uncle, Vincent Margera (also known as Don Vito) but after Margera's arrest back in 2006, the stunt was pulled from the final cut of the movie and was not shown in Jackass 2.5 (2007), so it was re-shot with Ehren McGhehey for this film, and the elder Margera was declared persona non grata among the cast and crew for some time.

In April 2010, JackassWorld.com was officially shut down, leaving a posting that said "gone filmin'," and "Thanks for the support the past two years. To keep abreast and adick of all things related to the world of jackass and Dickhouse (including the currently in production flick jackass 3D), follow us on Facebook and Twitter." In an interview with cameraman Rick Kosick, he revealed that JackassWorld.com will no longer be a website after the movie releases. Despite this claim, it was eventually relaunched as the main website for Dickhouse Productions.

Cameraman Lance Bangs explained the transition from television to cinema screen: "It's utterly crazy. Everything in 3-D looks as brightly colored as candy. I'm a cameraman on it, and it's amazing to watch the footage being turned 3-D, like watching everything through a viewfinder." He later went on to say, "I thought I was above peer pressure, but there's such camaraderie. I took part in a few stunts and ended up humiliated and hurt—me, the poetic film-maker friend of Spike Jonze."

In late May 2010, Knoxville stated that Steve-O's sobriety was at its best and, "there is no beer on set this time around even if some of us wish there was." He also said, "To be honest, it's going great. Everyone has had different injuries throughout, which is a good sign, and Steve-O is probably getting the best footage out of everybody. He is really going for it. He wants to prove to everyone he can do these stunts sober. It's been two years since he had a drink now. Everyone has been real supportive of him."

At the 2010 MTV Movie Awards, Tremaine said filming was nearly finished but they had not shot internationally yet but intended to shoot "a couple of bits".

An injury to cast member Bam Margera forced a rewrite for the beginning of the movie. On June 12, 2010, Margera was beaten on the head with a bat by a 59-year-old African-American woman outside of his bar, The Note. The woman alleged Bam called her a racial slur and that she was offended, but did not hit him. When Margera was approached by TMZ two days after the incident, he told them he "never used the n-word" and that "[the lady] attacked me times before". He explained:

I was internally bleeding in the brain for two days and they wouldn't let me leave the hospital. I was like, 'I need to go to Los Angeles in six hours to go finish Jackass.' We start tomorrow and I'm supposed to get hit in the head and now I can't because of her.

Margera added in the same interview that the opening sequence is being shot with Phantom high speed cameras, which record at 1,000 frames per second to produce hyper-slow motion, similar to the opening sequence of Zombieland (2009). Appropriately, make-up effects designer Tony Gardner, creator of the zombie hordes for Zombieland, was a designer for all of the Jackass films.

=== Injuries ===
In April 2010, Bam Margera told the Artisan News Service that the movie was 70% done and half the crew had been to the hospital with Margera having "three broken ribs and a broken shoulder and a twisted ankle as we speak." During filming, recurring guest cast member Loomis Fall suffered a compound fracture of his clavicle, and a broken hand after an improper landing during a stunt involving an umbrella and a jet engine; the X-ray of it is shown during the end credits.

Ehren McGhehey has broken his neck twice during the filming, as well as suffering a broken orbital bone during the "Lamborghini Tooth Pull" stunt.

=== Unused scenes ===
Deleted scenes that were filmed, but got cut out of both Jackass 3D and Jackass 3.5 include: "BB Gun Nipple Piercing", where Wee Man shoots Steve-O in the nipple with a BB gun; "Bed Sled", where Chris Pontius and Dave England slide down a snowy mountain on an inflatable bed; "Super Mighty Glue Goatee", where Johnny Knoxville puts super mighty glue on his chin and sticks it to Phil Margera's hairy chest; "Banana Gauntlet", where Wee Man, Dave, and Bam Margera slide on a lubed up table with banana peels while they're dressed up as gorillas, and trying to avoid the bananas that are swinging in their way; and "Piss Drink", where Steve-O uses Knoxville's catheter for Knoxville's torn urethra as a straw to drink his piss. Some of these deleted scenes are briefly shown in the credits of Jackass 3D or Jackass 3.5. Steve-O uploaded the full "BB Gun Nipple Piercing" to his YouTube channel.

== Release ==
=== Box office ===
Jackass 3D earned $117.2 million in North America, and $53.1 million in other territories, for a worldwide total of $170.3 million. It is the highest-grossing film of the series worldwide and separately in North America and overseas.

In the United States, the film had a record opening day for a fall release movie ($22 million), and posted a record October midnight opening ($2.5 million). It then held the record for the highest opening weekend gross in the month of October as well as the Fall season ($50.4 million) for one year until Paranormal Activity 3 claimed it in 2011 with a weekend gross of $52.6 million. Based on early outperforming predictions it would earn $30 million. It marked the highest-grossing opening weekend of the franchise, ahead of Jackass: The Movie ($22.8 million) and Jackass Number Two ($29 million). 3D accounted for 90% of its opening weekend gross; however, it still improved on the attendance of its predecessors. It then earned $65.6 million in its first week, which marked the largest Fall opening week of all time. It closed in theaters on January 20, 2011, with $117.2 million. The film made more overseas than both its predecessors combined. Its highest-grossing country, outside North America, was Australia ($9.9 million).

On September 19, 2025, Jackass 3D was re-released into select AMC Theatres and Regal Cinemas to coincide with the film's 15th anniversary and September being "National Pain Awareness Month". Box office figures for the re-release were not made available.

=== Critical response ===
Rotten Tomatoes gives the film an approval rating of 67% based on 111 reviews, and an average rating of 5.9/10. The website's critical consensus reads: "The Jackass gang might be running out of gross-out stunts, but this installment contains plenty of brilliantly brain-dead comedy—and the 3-D adds a pungent new dimension." Metacritic gives the film a weighted average score of 56 out of 100, based on 23 critics, indicating "mixed or average" reviews. Audiences polled by CinemaScore gave the film an average grade of "B+" on an A+ to F scale.

Owen Gleiberman of Entertainment Weekly gave the film a B grade. He notes that the audience wants to see Knoxville and the boys top themselves, and ultimately they achieve that. Gleiberman described the 3D as "the usual big nothing" and fails entirely to make the film any more disgusting. Washington Post critic Dan Kois described the film as "a touching ode to male friendship at its most primal" and describes the atmosphere as one of "infectious bonhomie". He sarcastically asks viewers if they are "highbrow" enough for Jackass 3D. He notes the apprehension of the performers before the stunts is nearly as exciting as the stunts themselves. Kois shows his appreciation not just for the stunts but also the way in which they are repeated in slow motion. He gives the film 3/4 stars. Michael Phillips of the Chicago Tribune criticizes the film describing it as "reductive, insanely violent slapstick" but he accepts that is the idea. Roger Moore of the Orlando Sentinel complains that the performers "aren't getting better, they're getting older" and the stunts that were cute ten years ago now seem forced and a little desperate.

== Home media ==
The DVD and Blu-ray versions of Jackass 3D were released on March 8, 2011, in three different versions. The first version is a Blu-ray/DVD combo pack with a digital copy; the second is a limited-edition two-disc DVD pack, and the third copy is a single-disc DVD. The special features on the Blu-ray/DVD combo pack include 11 deleted scenes and 29 outtakes, while the DVD versions include 2 deleted scenes and 5 outtakes. All versions include the MTV making-of special, a trailer, and an unrated version of the movie with a runtime of 100 minutes, including some extended scenes that were shortened in the theatrical version of the movie. With the Blu-ray/DVD combo pack and the limited edition two-disc DVD pack, the second disc includes an anaglyphic 3D version of the movie (four pairs of glasses were provided). No true Blu-ray 3D version has been made available to date. Jackass 3D is exclusively available for rent on 3DTVs which support the 3DGO! streaming app, as well as through VR platforms through Bigscreen VR.

== Jackass 3.5 ==
Jackass 3.5 was a direct-to-home media version with additional footage. The film was compiled from outtakes shot during the making of the third film, and released in weekly installments on Joost from April 1 through June 13, 2011. The first trailer was originally released online on January 27, 2011, and the feature-length movie was released on Blu-ray and DVD on June 14, 2011, less than a week before Ryan Dunn's death.

The most notable added bits include: Johnny Knoxville attempting to skate on full speed treadmills, Bam Margera skating through four sheets of drywall, Steve-O getting bit by an alligator snapping turtle, Ryan Dunn running on a row of chairs while wearing binoculars, Dave England BASE jumping off a motorcycle, Chris Pontius getting his penis pecked by a woodpecker, Wee Man scaring members of the cast while he's camouflage painted in the hallway, Preston Lacy getting hit on his head by a ball attached to bungee cord, and Ehren McGhehey unsuspectingly getting shocked by defibrillators while he's sleeping.

In describing the sequel in an interview conducted prior to Jackass 3D's theatrical release, Johnny Knoxville said, "We shot two movies worth of material." Originally, Knoxville said the film might be ready for a Christmas 2010 DVD release, but it was reported in late October that the film would not be released until after Christmas.

The television premiere for Jackass 3.5 was June 9 on MTV, which was followed by an encore on MTV2 on June 10. Notably, it was shown on November 28, 2011, after the Tribute to Ryan Dunn on MTV.

The DVD was released in Australia on August 3 as part of an eight-disc box-set which also includes the other movies, all three volumes of the television series and the Lost Tapes. The film was released as a separate disc on September 1. The set was also published in the United States & Canada in 2016, omitting the series (already released on DVD there), but including the 3 main films, as well as the three "Jackass .5" films, plus Jackass Presents: Bad Grandpa and its ".5" film.

== Spin-off ==
In March 2012, Johnny Knoxville discussed the possibility of a fourth film, saying "we're keeping our mind open" and "I've got 50–60 ideas on top of all the stuff we didn't get to shoot." Then in June 2012, it was reported Paramount "registered several domains for a film that would be called Bad Grandpa."

During Bam Margera's September 18, 2012, interview on The Howard Stern Show about Jackass he said: "There's going to be a whole movie about Knoxville's grandpa character."

Bad Grandpa was officially announced in July 2013 and released on October 25, 2013, exactly 11 years after the release of the first film. The film was dedicated to cast member Ryan Dunn, who died in 2011 following a fatal car crash.

== Soundtrack ==
Jackass 3D: Music from the Motion Picture

Soundtrack album by various artists
- Released: October 25, 2010
- Genres: Punk, metal, country, folk
- Label: Epitaph

Singles from Jackass 3D: Music from the Motion Picture
- 1. "Memories" Released: August 10, 2010; 2. "Afterworld" Released: September 29, 2010

Jackass 3D: Music from the Motion Picture was released via a link to Punknews.org on the official Jackass Facebook page. Karen O of the Yeah Yeah Yeahs returns again to contribute toward the soundtrack (like Jackass Number Two).

In August 2010, Weezer frontman Rivers Cuomo confirmed that their song "Memories" will be featured in the film.

CKY also announced that they created an exclusive track for the movie, titled "Afterworld". The single was released on September 30, 2010.

1. "Corona" (Jackass Opera Mix) by Squeak E. Clean
2. "The Kids Are Back" by Twisted Sister
3. "If You're Gonna Be Dumb, You Gotta Be Tough" by Karen O
4. "Memories" by Weezer
5. "Party in My Pants" by Roger Alan Wade
6. "Invisible Man" by Smut Peddlers
7. "I'm Shakin'" by The Blasters
8. "I Got Your Number" by Cock Sparrer
9. "You Can't Roller Skate in a Buffalo Herd" by Roger Miller
10. "Been Blown to Shreds" by Sassafras
11. "Brand New Key" by Melanie
12. "Alcohol" by Gang Green
13. "Afterworld" by CKY

== Sequel ==
A sequel to Jackass 3D, titled Jackass Forever, was released on February 4, 2022.
