= List of Jackass episodes =

Jackass is an American reality comedy series, originally shown on MTV in one year from Fall 2000 to Summer 2001, for 25 episodes in half-hour format, featuring people performing various dangerous, crude, ridiculous, self-injuring stunts and pranks.

== Series overview ==
Each episode is approximately 21:30 in length (without commercials), except for the first (20:05) and last (19:30) episodes and the one-hour special (41:50 without ads).

The pilot was originally broadcast April 12, 2000 on the MTV Network, then repeated as the first episode of the series on October 1, 2000. Episodes were broadcast on Sunday nights on MTV. Reruns were shown in weeks without an original broadcast, and the entire series was rebroadcast into early 2002.

| Season | Episodes | Originally released | |
| Season | Episodes | First released | Last released |
|---|---|---|---|
| 1 | 8 | October 1, 2000 | November 19, 2000 |
| 2 | 8 | February 18, 2001 | April 22, 2001 |
| 3 | 9 | June 17, 2001 | August 12, 2001 |

== Episodes ==
=== Season 1 (2000) ===
| No. overall | No. in season | Title | Original release date |
|---|---|---|---|
| 1 | 1 | "Poo Cocktail" | April 12, 2000 r:October 1, 2000 |
Pilot. Stunts included in this episode: Cannonball, Johnny Coxville, Mountain Bike Into Porta Potty, Fast Food Football, Steve-O Shot Glass, Self Defense, Sled Drag Behind Car, Body In Trunk, Golf Course, Shopping Carts, Bam Margera Skateboarding under a bridge, Wee Man, Bed Slam, Daddy and Baby, Fat Fucks, Fast Food Fall and Poo Cocktail
| 2 | 2 | "Blind Driver" | October 8, 2000 |
Stunts included in this episode: Alligator Intro, Roller Jump, Pillow At Head, Blind Driver, Naked Dave, Trampoline Madness, Bam Teases Dog, Haggard BMX, Human Barbecue, Skateboard Spin, Door Bumper, Urban Kayak, Streaker In the Night, Boxing, Fall With Lamp, Jockstrap, Swim By Dude and The Goldfish.
| 3 | 3 | "Bam Kicking His Dad's Ass All Day Today" | October 15, 2000 |
Stunts included in this episode: Vert Ramp Intro, Shockwave Dog Collar, The Skunk, Oddly Shaped Men 1, Bam Beating Phil for a Day, Day Monkey at Zoo, Mexican Snowboarding, Oddly Shaped Men 2, Big Wheel Craze 1, Sexercise Bike, Oddly Shaped Men 3, Daddy and Baby 2, Spike Spit, Up in Flames, Oddly Shaped Men 4 and Elephant Poo Dive.
| 4 | 4 | "Poo Poo Platter" | October 22, 2000 |
Stunts included in this episode: Yokozuna Intro, Crossbow, Sumo Wrestling, Heavy Metal Wake Up, Laundry Bin Down Stairs, Ehren's Jackass Sunburn, Poo Hug, Satan vs. God, Bush Jump, Poo Poo Platter, Naked Steve-O in Hotel, Squid Suit, Heavy Metal Alarm Clock, Poo Toilet and 50 Egg Challenge.
| 5 | 5 | "Mianus" | October 29, 2000 |
Stunts included in this episode: Dorothy Barnett Intro, The Bee-kini, Naked Mowing, Night Monkey Flagpole, Slingshot Pond, Night Monkey Stopping Car, Taxidermist, Bam and Brandon Slapping Each Other, Extreme Pogo, Naked Dave 2, Butt Stapling, Sling Shot Skateboarding, Mianus, Bloody Cell Phone and Poo Dive.
| 6 | 6 | "Poo Joust" | November 5, 2000 |
Stunts included in this episode: German Tourist Intro, Mr. Mean, Raab the Native, BMX Joust, The Mullet, White Trash Knights 1, Ferret Fun, Bread Suit, Jess and Bam, Pontius the Barbarian, Beach Vaulting, Sporting Goods Basketball, Kosick vs. Snake, White Trash Football Joust, Pig Balls, No Shirt No Shoes No Service, Medieval Shopping Cars, Shark Hugs and Poo Joust.
| 7 | 7 | "Casket" | November 12, 2000 |
Stunts included in this episode: Childrens Intro, Yoga Class, Alligatorama, Bloody Rollerblader, Bush Jump, The Magic Show, Alligator on the Streets, Extreme Scooting, The Hearse, Golf Course Prank, Street Fishing and Stinky Directions.
| 8 | 8 | "Santa Colonic" | November 19, 2000 |
Stunts included in this episode: Santa Kick Intro, Aggressive Sledding, Santa Dive-Bombing Chicken 1, Land Skiing, Yeti On Pogo, Santa Skateboarding, Snowcat vs. Snowman, California Bobsledding, Santa Dive-Bombing Chicken 2, Grass Skiing, Santa Skateboarding 2, Nude Suit, Coil Man Jump and Roll, Skid Row Santa, Ryan Drops In As Santa, Santa Colonic, Snowmobile Crash and Eggnog Challenge.

=== Season 2 (2001) ===
| No. overall | No. in season | Title | Original release date |
|---|---|---|---|
| 9 | 1 | "Cup Test" | February 18, 2001 |
Stunts included in this episode: Elephant Intro, Cup Tests, Fat Lip Escalator Slide, Hockey Fight, Goat Fart, Plunger Wake Up, Restaurant Fight, Human Bull's-Eye, Human Red Carpet, San Francisco Snowboarding, Motocross, Dog Attack and The Worm Trick.
| 10 | 2 | "Jai Alai" | February 25, 2001 |
Stunts included in this episode: Donkey Intro, Broken Arm Guy 1, The Treadmill, Fire Extinguisher, Party Boy, Guch Tricycle Slide, Jai Alai, Car Crawl, Human Tricycle, Snake River BMX, Broken Arm Guy 2, Phil's Pies, and Cow Insemination.
| 11 | 3 | "The Loop" | March 4, 2001 |
Stunts included in this episode: Football Team Intro, Punt Return, Sexercise Bike 1, Lawn Trap, American Werewolf (In London), The Loop, The Goose, Sexercise Bike 2, The Rattlesnake, Don Vito's Dent, Corn Sledding, Go-Kart on Ramp, Bam's Second Day, Sexercise Bike 3 and Butt Piercing.
| 12 | 4 | "Wakeboarding" | March 11, 2001 |
Stunts included in this episode: Phil Intro, Department Store Boxing, Antiquing, Big Wheel Race, Red Wagon, Wakeboarding, Bran's Voices, Human Wrecking Ball, Bikini Wax, Meter Fairy, Party Boy UK, Stilt High Dive, Big Wheel Crossbow and Bucket Cars.
| 13 | 5 | "Donut" | March 18, 2001 |
Stunts included in this episode: Intro With the Dogowners, Rolling Stone Cover Shoot, Yellow Sled 1, Phil's Chair, Party Boy Football Streak, Cowboy Skate Park, Human Bowling, Yellow Sled 2, Daddy And Baby 3, Raab Himself on Toilet, Bam Boating with Tony Hawk, Wheelbarrow, Oddly Shaped Men, Rugby, Gator Unicycle and Milk Challenge.
| 14 | 6 | "Slingshot" | April 8, 2001 |
Stunts included in this episode: Stilts Intro, The Fire Hose, Toilet Ride, Stilt Boxing, The Straitjacket, Air Boat, Blindfolded Skateboarding, Human Raft, Slingshot 2, Tarred and Feathered, Horsey Slingshot, One Legged Man and Blackhead.
| 15 | 7 | "Eddie's Auto" | April 15, 2001 |
Stunts included in this episode: Park Guy Intro, Vert Ramp, Lake Jump, Dog Humping Skateboard, Big Wheel Craze 2, Bear Wrestling, Armor Drag, Roller Bobby, Eddie's Auto, Drop-in Launch, Fisherman's Wharf, Naked Biker, Kosick Voice Over and Dumb But Tough.
| 16 | 8 | "The Matador" | April 22, 2001 |
Stunts included in this episode: Bike Dive Intro, The Matador, Bam Toboggan, Human Handrail, Party Boy Calf Rope, Bobbing For Jellyfish, Preston Punches Jeff, High Dive 2, Wee Squirt Gun, Hand Off, Extreme Squared, Pontius Squirt Gun, Raab Naked Zamboni and Ice Blocking.

=== Season 3 (2001) ===
| No. overall | No. in season | Title | Original release date |
|---|---|---|---|
| 17 | 1 | "Beard of Leeches" | June 17, 2001 |
Stunts included in this episode: Puffy Intro, Beard Of Leeches, Fat Fucks 2, Wee Hand, Wood Chipper, Ice Board, Ice Barrel Jumping, Stilt Fall, Urban Sledding, Extreme Jacuzzi, Start Your Engine, Plugs, Idiot Launch, Phil In Elvis Suit, and The Omelette
| 18 | 2 | "Spermathon" | June 24, 2001 |
Stunts included in this episode: Bounty Hunter Intro, Dutch BMX, Taxi 1, Snow Surfing, Crawfish Diapers, Hockey Check, Taxi 2, Full-Pipe Skating, Ultimate Fighting Challenge, Phil Sabotage, and Spermathon
| 19 | 3 | "Office Chairs" | July 1, 2001 |
Stunts included in this episode: Intro With The Knoxville Family, Krazy Glue Test, Bran and Hannah Bucket Cars, Office Chairs, Extreme Unicycle, Poo Switcheroo, Knoxville's Senior Photo, Tandem Biking, Cop Kitty, Bottle Skating, Cow Suit, The Bat, Dimitry the Terrible, Emu Hunter, Blue Diamond Drop In, and The Accidental Poo
| 20 | 4 | "Slip & Slide" | July 8, 2001 |
Stunts included in this episode: Sliding Johnny Intro, Slide and Slip, Rude Man 1, The Body Cast, Ehren Snowboarding, Crapper Sled, Human Piñata, Trip Bucket, Carpet Skating, Rude Man 2, Hunchback at Notre Dame, Metro Bunny, Rude Man 3, Paintball Draw, Hurdle Jump, Bread Suit 2, Wee King, Rude Man 4, and Nutball
| 21 | 5 | "Bloody Windshield" | July 15, 2001 |
Stunts in this episode: Kospig Intro, Bloody Windshield, Pogo Stick Skateboarding, Rolling Down a Hill, Drop Knee Land Boogie, Snow Tubing, Tube Roll 2, Car Wash, Pontius Eats a Bug, Skunk Car, Steve-O Kisses Ehren, Snow Ladder, Belt Sander Skates, Ehren Crack Wake Up, Dutch Girl, Naked Skating, Tube Roll, and Oklahoma
| 22 | 6 | "Playgirl Pontius" | July 22, 2001 |
Stunts included in this episode: Pontius Fish Intro, The Magnet Suit, Hot Dog Skateboarding, Chemical Spill, Snow Scooter, Hot Dog Slap Shot, Football Follies, Backwards Bullride, Steve-O Scooter Jump, Prostitute Boat Race, Shark Ride, Hot Dog BMX, Face Your Fears, Hot Dog Gymnastics, and Playgirl Pontius
| 23 | 7 | "Gumball Rally 3000" | July 29, 2001 r:February 3, 2002 |
One hour special. Russian Guy Intro, Johnny Knoxville, Steve-O and Chris Pontius join the annual race around Europe, have fun in other countries, and get in some trouble along the way.
| 24 | 8 | "Bloody Carpet" | August 5, 2001 |
Stunts included in this episode: Gene Simmons Intro, Phil Paintball Ambush, Water Jumping, Sleep-O, Sculpture Garden, Night Monkey 2, Ice Block Skating, Green Nuisance in Crosswalk, BMX Polo, Security Guard, Ice Craze, Tandem Snowboarding, The Toupee and Bloody Carpet.
| 25 | 9 | "The Bed Wetter" | August 12, 2001 |
Stunts included in this episode: Mixed Intro, The Abduction, Pontius Escalator Ride, 90 Year-Old Man 1, Horse Fart, Shaq Video Shoot, Cricket Helmet, Garbage Man, Skatewheel, Alaska Sled Craze, Cheerleaders, 90 Year-Old Man 2, The Double Back, Duck Hunting, Bed Wetter, Skeet Shooting, Totem Pole, Jackass Tattoo, 90 Year-Old Man 3, Thrashin' Joust, Wolfie Bikini and Poo Diaper.

== DVD releases ==
The DVD release of the Jackass television series is unconventional in that instead of being released as full season sets as the show was originally aired, the individual stunts and sketches were re-compiled into 22 new "episodes", and released on five DVDs over a 7 year period.

Contrary to popular assumption, Volumes One through Three do not line up exactly with the TV seasons and each volume contains segments from across all three seasons. However, the opening stunt of each DVD "episode" does correspond to the same number TV episode's first stunt, and several of the other stunts also match in each episode. Volume 1 "episodes" 1-5 roughly correspond to s1 e1-5, Volume 2 1-5 to s2 e1-5, and Volume 3 1-6 to s3 e1-6. The remaining 3 episodes from each season have no match.

The 3 volumes were packaged into a box set with a bonus disc. The bonus disc contains the one hour special episode "Gumball Rally 3000", presented as originally aired. The bonus disc also includes a few stunts not found in the 3 volumes, as well as various bonus features like outtakes and interviews.

Volume Four, sub-titled "The Lost Tapes", compiles the rest of the segments that hadn't yet been included in the previous three volumes and the bonus disc, plus bits that never aired on the TV series (mostly for censorship reasons). Volume 4 "episode" 1 begins with the "Johnny Cannonball" intro that also begins s1e1 (the pilot). The opening stunt "Self Defense" is also from the pilot; though it doesn't appear first in the original episode, it was the first stunt officially filmed for the TV series (in November 1998). There is no correspondence in the rest of the DVD "episode" 1, nor in the remaining "episodes" 2-5.

Volumes Two and Three were released by Paramount Home Video shortly after the conclusion of the series in December 2002. Volume One was delayed, but first released in the 3-volume box set in December 2005, and then released by itself a month later on January 23, 2006. The bonus disc with Gumball Rally 3000 and other material was released only in the 3-volume box set of December 2005, and has not been released separately. The fourth volume "The Lost Tapes" was finally released in October 2009.

=== Volume One ===
Released: December 6, 2005
Episode 1: Johnny Coxville, Steve-O Shot Glass, Body in Trunk, Golf Course, Yoga Class, Skateboard Drop-In, Alligatorama, Bed Slam, Bloody Rollerblader, The Magic Show, Shopping Carts, Daddy and Baby 1, Fat F**k, Fast Food Fall, Poo Cocktail.
Episode 2: Pillow at Head, Santa Dive-Bombing Chicken, Blind Driver, Yeti on Pogo, Bam Teasing Dog, Street Fishing, Haggard BMX, Skateboard Spin, Land Skiing, Door Bumper, Urban Kayak, Skateboard Into Bush, Boxing, Extreme Scooting, Fall with Lamp, Aggressive Sledding, Jockstrap, Swim by Dude, The Goldfish, Golf Course Prank, The Hearse.
Episode 3: Skunk, Santa Karate Studio, Oddly Shaped Men, Santa Dive-Bombing Chicken 2, Bam Beating Phil For a Day, Bam Ollie Fall, Day Monkey at Zoo, California Bobsledding, Coil Man Jump and Roll, Mexican Snowboarding, Oddly Shaped Men 2, Big Wheel Craze 1, Santa Skateboarding, Sexercise Bike, Grass Skiing, Oddly Shaped Men 3, Daddy and Baby 2, Ryan Drops in as Santa, Spike Spit, Santa Colonic, Oddly Shaped Men 4, Elephant Poo Dive, Snowcat vs. Snowman.
Episode 4: Crossbow, Pig Balls, Sumo Wrestling, Raab the Native, Heavy Metal Wake-Up, The Mullet, Laundry Bin Downstairs, BMX Joust, Jackass Sunburn, Egg Nog Challenge, Naked Steve-O in Hotel, Medieval Shopping Carts, Squid Suit, White Trash Knights 1, Heavy Metal Alarm Clock, Jess and Bam, 50 Egg Challenge, White Trash Football Joust, Snowmobile Crash, Bread Suit.
Episode 5: The Beekini, Slingshot Pond, Night Monkey Flagpole, Taxidermist, Bam and Brandon Slapping Each Other, Extreme Pogo, Kosick vs. Snake, Steve-O Staples Ass, Slingshot Skateboard, Mianus, Ferret Fun, Bloody Cell Phone, Night Monkey Car Alarms, Poo Dive, Mr. Mean.

=== Volume Two ===
Released: December 10, 2002
Episode 1: The Cup Test, Fat Lip Escalator Slide, Goat Fart, Plunger Wake-Up, Hockey Fight, Human Bullseye, The Blackhead, Human Red Carpet, San Francisco Snowboarding, Motocross, Dog Attack, The Worm Trick, Ice Blocking, Toilet Ride, Slingshot 2.
Episode 2: Broken Arm Guy 1, Treadmill, The Straightjacket, Party Boy, Raab Naked Zamboni, Jai Alai, Human Tricicyle, Bobbing for Jellyfish, Snake River BMX, Broken Arm Guy 2, Human Handrail, Pie Face Phil, Artificial Insemination, Party Boy Calf Rope.
Episode 3: Punt Return, Sexercise Bike 1, High Dive 2, Lawn Trap, American Werewolf (in London), Wee Squirt Gun, Naked Wake-Up, The Loop, The Goose, The Fire Hose, Sexercise Bike 2, The Rattlesnake, Don Vito, Pontius Squirt Gun, Corn Sledding, Go Kart on Ramp, Bam Toboggan, Bam's Second Day, Sexercise Bike 3, Butt Piercing, Preston Punches Jeff.
Episode 4: Department Store Boxing, Antiquing, Big Wheel Race, Red Wagon, Horsey Slingshot, Brandon Freestyling, Fisherman's Wharf, Human Wrecking Ball, Bikini Wax, Meter Fairy, Party Boy UK, Stilt High Dive, Big Wheel Crossbow, Bucket Cars, The Matador.
Episode 5: Rolling Stone Cover Shoot, Ehren Yellow Sled, Phil Chair Prank, Party Boy Football Streak, Human Bowling, Cliver Yellow Sled, Daddy and Baby 3, Kosick VO. Stilt Boxing, Bam Boating with Tony Hawk, Wheelbarrow, Oddly Shaped Men 5, Big Wheel Craze 2, Gator Unicycle, Roller Bobby, Raab Himself on Toilet, Dog Humping Skateboard, Armor Drag, Bam's Drop-in Launch, Blindfolded Skateboarding, One Legged Man.

=== Volume Three ===
Released: December 10, 2002
Episode 1: Beard of Leeches, Poo Diaper, Fat F**k 2, Wee Hand, 90 Year Old Man 1, Ice Board, Thrashin' Joust, Ice Barrel Jumping, Stilt Fall, Idiot Launch, Duck Hunting, Extreme Squared, Ryan's Nose, Wolfie Bikini, Phil in Elvis Suit, The Omelette, Pontius Escalator Ride.
Episode 2: Krazy Glue Test, Bran and Hannah Bucket Cars, Office Chairs, Poo Switcheroo, Garbage Man, Knoxville's Senior Photo, Tandem Biking, Alaska Sled Craze, Cop Kitty, 90 Year Old Man 2, Bottle Skating, Jackass Tattoo, Cow Suit, Totem Pole, The Bat, Preston Cheerleader, Dimitry the Terrible, Cricket Helmet, 90 Year Old Man 3, Blue Diamond Drop-in, The Accidental Poo, The Double Back.
Episode 3: Bounty Hunter, Show Open, Dutch BMX, Body in Bag, Snow Surfing, Hockey Check, Full-Pipe Skating, Shaq Video Shoot, Ultimate Fighting Challenge, Phil Sabotage, Spermathon, Horse Fart, Phil Paintball Ambush, Tube Jumping, Sleep-O.
Episode 4: Slide & Slip, Johnny Backup, The Body Cast, Pink Speedo Snowboarding, Crapper Sled, Human Piñata, Trip Bucket, Carpet Skating, Johnny Blocksville, The Toupee, Hunchback of Notre Dame, Metro Bunny, Paintball Draw, Wooden Stairs, Bread Suit 2, Knoxville on Bench, Wee King, No Rain, Nutball, Tandem Snowboarding.
Episode 5: Bloody Windshield, Pogo-Stick Skateboarding, Tube Roll, Boogie Boarding, Snow Tubing, Tube Roll 2, Car Wash, Pontius Eats a Bug, Skunk Car, Steve-O Kisses Ehren, Snow Ladder, Belt Sander Skates, Ehren Crack Wake-Up, Dutch Girl, Naked Skating, Stupid Idea Rolling Down a Hill, Oklahoma, Bloody Carpet.
Episode 6: The Magnet Suit, Hot Dog Skateboarding, Ice Block Skating, Chemical Spill, BMX Polo, Snow Scooter, Ice Craze, Hot Dog Slap Shot, Backwards Bullride, Steve-O Scooter Jump, Prostitute Boat Race, Shark Ride, Green Nuisance in Crosswalk, Hot Dog BMX, Security Guard, Face Your Fears, Hot Dog Gymnastics, Playgirl Pontius, Sculpture Garden.

=== Bonus Disc ===
Released: December 6, 2005
Special episode: Gumball Rally 3000.
Other stunts: Abduction, Night Monkey 2, et al.

=== The Lost Tapes ===
Released: October 11, 2009
(*) = not on TV
Episode 1: Cannonball Intro, Self Defense, Tar and Feather, Sleep-O (Dimitry Booger), Fast Food Football, The Human Raft, *The Vomelet (original hotel room), *Ryan 2nd Story Bush Drop, Cowboy Skatepark, Shockwave Collar, Mountain Bike Into Porta Potty, Satan vs. God (original), *Dimtiry Hits Ehren with Bat, Wood Chipper.
Episode 2: Pee Pee Wake Up Jeff, Football Follies, Gee Golf Poo-in-one, Wee Man Oompa Loompa Skater, Sleep-O (Chris Lombardi), Eddie's Auto, Bam Off Roof, Crawfish Diaper, Ehren Antiques Kosick, Putt Putt, *Human Skatepark, Emu Hunter, *Milk Challenge, Sleep-O (Wee Man Butt), Johnny X-ray & Roller Jump, Raab Naked Bicycle, Hand Off, Sauna Credits.
Episode 3: Human Skeet Shoot, *Jeff Pees on Pontius' Shirt, Extreme Unicycling, *Naked Clyde, Poo Poo Platter, Bam Leaf Pile Jump, Sporting Goods Basketball, Trampoline Madness, Extreme Jacuzziing, No Shoes No Pants No Service, *The Brand, *Metal Drum Roll Off Roof, *Poo on a Stick 1, Rugby, Nude Suit, *Tiny Skateboard, Air Boat, Night Monkey, *Deer Humper, *Bammy Poppins (Bam Parasol Roof Jump), Fire Extinguisher, Backwards Kiddie Slide, Wakeboarding, *Pie Eating Contest, Stair Slide.
Episode 4: Bear Wrestling, *Ryan Night Fall From Dorm, Snowman Bloodbath Animation, *Baby Wee Man Jogging Tricycle, White Trash Bicycle Joust, *Gladiator, *Dimitry Poop, Unicycle Poo Barf, Johnny Alligator, Lake Jump, *Human Voodoo Doll, Farting for Directions, *Street Soccer, *Bam Pees Down Rail, Satan vs God 2, Hockey Fight, *Wee Man Teeth Squirt.
Episode 5: Skid Row Santa, Poo on Toilet Seat, The Skatewheel, Ryan Jumps on Car, Pontius the Barbarian, *Steve-O Stilt Poop, Urban Sledding, Sled Drag Behind Car, Raccoon Urine, *Sleep-O (Banana), Poo Joust, *Lifeguard Fall, The Bed Wetter, White Paint Ruined Suit, Shark Hugs, Naked Mowing, *The Human Urinal, *Busy Street Crossing, *Box Down Stairs.

== Unreleased segments ==
Bits that were filmed but never got released on the TV series include:

- "Convict" where Johnny Knoxville is dressed up in an L.A. County Jail orange prison jumpsuit with handcuffs around his wrists and ankles, he then walks into a hardware store and asks the co-workers for a hacksaw to cut the handcuffs with. (Shown on Jackass: Best and Last)
- The original hotel room "Vomelet" where Dave England consumes the ingredients for an omelet then vomits them up into a hot skillet. (released 2006 on Jackass Unrated DVD, 4/5/08 on jackassworld.com, and 2009 on The Lost Tapes DVD)
- "Skid Row Party Boy" where Chris Pontius dances in front of homeless people while wearing nothing but a thong. (released 8/05/08 on jackassworld.com)
- "Dry Throat" where Ehren McGhehey eats a spoon full of flour for $20 which he does successfully, but nearly suffocates.
- "Oompa Loompa Two" where Wee Man and Preston Lacy being dressed as Oompa Loompas while Wee Man is riding a skateboard and Preston is riding a scooter in public. (released 8/12/08 on jackassworld.com)
- Steve-O sticking a fire cracker in his ass and igniting it.
- Pontius taking a piss in a crowded elevator.
- "Poo Dollar" where Brandon DiCamillo and Bam Margera put shit on a dollar bill then leaving it on the ground for unsuspecting victims to pick up. This was shown briefly in the 2001 film CKY3.
- "The Poo Handle" where Dave England wipes his shit on Jeff Tremaine's hotel room door handle. (released 4/8/08 on jackassworld.com)
- "Tremaine's Revenge" where Tremaine pisses in Dave's suitcase.
- "Poo Sock" where Knoxville pretends to have both of his hands broken, he then goes to a store to try on new shoes while having both of his socks covered in shit.
- "The Brand" where Steve-O gets a heart-shaped brand on his chest. (released 2009 on The Lost Tapes DVD)
- Steve-O shooting fireworks at Pontius who uses his ass as a shield.
- "Trailer Park" where Steve-O gets the Ichthys with "satan" within tattooed on his right arm, in a trailer home by an unlicensed tattooist.
- A music video for Shaquille O'Neal's song "Psycho" featuring Preston, Pontius, Steve-O and Wee Man doing stunts.
- "Bammy Poppins". (released 2006 on Jackass Unrated DVD, 8/26/08 on jackassworld.com, and 2009 on The Lost Tapes DVD)
- "Box Down Stairs". (released 2006 on Jackass Unrated DVD, 5/6/08 on jackassworld.com, 2009 on The Lost Tapes DVD, and shown on Jackass: Best and Last)
- "Street Soccer". (released 7/6/08 on jackassworld.com and 2009 on The Lost Tapes DVD)
- "The Human Urinal". (released 2001 on Don't Try This at Home: The Steve-O Video, 4/29/08 on jackassworld.com, and 2009 on The Lost Tapes DVD)
- "Putt Putt" where Knoxville visits a mini-golf course and treats it like a full-scale driving range. (filmed in 2001 for season 2 or 3; released 3/13/08 on jackassworld.com, and 2009 on The Lost Tapes DVD)

Some of these deleted bits were released on:

- "Too Hot For MTV" unaired TV special
- CKY video series
- Don't Try This at Home: The Steve-O Video
- "Jackass: The Movie" unrated re-edit 2006 DVD
- jackassworld.com website
- "Jackass: The Lost Tapes" 2009 DVD
- Jackass: Best and Last

== Re-releases ==
Between March and April 2022 the complete series was re-released streaming on Paramount+, along with the 5 compilation "episodes" from the DVD "Jackass: The Lost Tapes", which contain bits that never made it to air, as "Season 4".
