= Rad Girls =

- Genre: Reality television
- Created by: Ramona Cash; Jason R. Martinez
- Starring: Ramona Ca$h; Munchie; Darling Clementine
- Country of origin: United States
- Original language: English
- No. of seasons: 2
- No. of episodes: 18

Production
- Executive producers: Ramona Cash; Jason R. Martinez
- Producers: Rad Girls Productions: Audra Clemons; Lindsay Morrisson
- Production location: Los Angeles, California
- Running time: 22 minutes (without commercials)

Original release
- Network: Fuse (2007); MAVTV (2008)
- Release: April 24, 2007 – December 26, 2008

Related
- Jackass

Rad Girls was a stunt and prank television show which aired on the music network Fuse TV and then on MAVTV. The show's format was essentially a female version of MTV's Jackass, with three female performers: Ramona Cash, Munchie, and Darling Clementine, doing stunts and pranks that involve disgusting food, bodily excretions, and debauchery.

According to the trio's MySpace page, Fuse decided to change format to exclusively music-based programming, thus not renewing Rad Girls for a second season. Over 4,000 ardent fans of Rad Girls signed an online petition ("Bring Back the Rad Girls!") to get the show back on the air, but their contract with Fuse ended in February 2008. Rad Girls Season 2 premiered on November 7, 2008 on MavTV, an HD network oriented towards male viewers.

The program has also aired internationally, on five continents: Australia (XYZ Networks), New Zealand (C4 New Zealand), Canada (Alliance Atlantis Broadcasting Inc.), UK (MTV Networks Europe), South Africa (M-Net), Brazil (Globosat), and Korea (Dong ah TV).

== Episodes ==
=== Season one ===
| Segments | Air Date | Ep # | Summary |
|---|---|---|---|
| Rad Serves; Wax the Beaver; Palms Thai Restaurant; Smellevator; Wheel of Puke | April 24, 2007 | 1 | Darling serves tennis balls to Munchie and Ramona's butts; Ramona waxes her vaginal hair with the assistance of a motor vehicle; Ramona covers herself with water and flops on the ground like a mermaid, while making dolphin noises; The girls "fart" in an elevator with numerous strangers in it; The Rad Girls spin a wheel with multiple foods and eat the one it lands on until they puke. |
| Fart In Mouth; Hadaka Sushi; Stripper Auditions; Crane Wedgies; Turd Batting Cages; Hot Sauce Shots; The Cyst | May 1, 2007 | 2 | Ramona asks people from the street if she can fart in their mouth; The Rad Girls eat sushi off an obese man's body parts; Ramona and Darling audition to be club strippers, in the process dancing terribly; The Rad Girls attach their underwear to a crane while the crane lifts them off the ground giving them huge wedgies; The girls hit elephant, dog, and horse turds at the batting cages; The girls take shots of hot sauce that a ping pong ball lands in; Darling or "Nurse Clementine" stabs a needle into a cyst on Munchie's hand. |
| Bridal Boxing; Nipple Slip News; Los Luchadores; Guess My Lunch; No Bathroom Break | May 8, 2007 | 3 | Munchie and Ramona box multiple rounds in wedding dresses; It's Rad Girls Action News with Dee Clementino! Darling interviews people on the street while her boob accidentally slips out of her dress; Munchie and Ramona wrestle against Andrew in mud with Darling reffing; Ramona has people burp in her face and guesses what they ate by the smell; The Rad Girls have a pissing contest and see who can get the fullest bucket of pee, later adding other excrements. |
| Yeast Infection News; X-Rated Mimes; Tumble Dry; Lube Luge; Pizza Porn; Show Me Your Junk | May 15, 2007 | 4 | It's Rad Girls Action News with Dee Clementino! Darling interviews people on the street while scratching her privates. She then reveals her hand covered in yeast (which is actually tapioca pudding); The girls perform inappropriate acts while dressed as mimes; The girls ride inside a dryer at the laundromat; The Rad Girls dress as sperm while they slide on lube into a sex doll; The girls create a mock set of a pretend porn taping and invite a pizza delivery boy to participate. Munchie asks girls to show her their package. |
| Staircase Slide; Bovine Bistro; Meat Bikini; Cream of Corn Run; Pop Snorting; Dutch Oven | May 22, 2007 | 5 | The Rad Girls slide down the stairs on surfboards, in sleeping bags, and in tubs; Ramona cooks Munchie and Darling a bull testicle and camel testicle meal; Darling walks around in a bikini made of meat; Munchie runs a marathon while drinking creamed corn; Darling and Munchie snort soda up their nose; The girls get people from the street to lay in bed with them under the covers while they fart. |
| Preggers Strip Party; Rad Girls Anti-Smoking Campaign; Burrito Roulette; Old Man Make Out | May 29, 2007 | 6 | The Rad Girls try to freak out a male stripper by trying to convince him to marry a "pregnant" Clementine; The girls go out and spray fire hydrants on people on the streets who are smoking cigarettes; The girls put their pubic hair in a burrito and one will have to eat it; Munchie and Clementine make out with octogenarians. |
| Rad Girls vs. Supermodels; Marco Polo; Human Bouquet; Blow Me | June 5, 2007 | 7 | The Rad Girls do multiple tasks against models to see who is better competition (featuring a song by the Hazzards); The girls play a game of Marco Polo throughout stores in LA; The girls make themselves into a giant bouquet of 120 roses with extra long thorns; Munchie and Ramona use hair dryers to blow on each other and see who will pull back first from the burn. |
| Hot Sauce Bath; Belly Flop Contest; Rad Tattoo; Wasabi Facemask | June 19, 2007 | 8 | Clementine takes a bath in hot sauce, then a shower in milk; Ramona, Munchie, and Clementine do belly flops off of a diving board and get judged 1 to 10 on their performance by 3 judges; Mallick and Clementine get matching "Rad Girls" tattoos; "Senior Spring Break" music video by The Hazzards; The Rad Girls use wasabi as a facemask and confirm that it hurts. Later they cover their faces with chocolate pudding and blow on it with leaf blowers. |
| Best of (1) Wax the Beaver; Bridal Boxing; Wheel of Puke; Old Man Make Out; Cream of Corn Run | June 26, 2007 | 9 | The first of two best-of episodes for season one. |
| Best of (2) Burrito Roulette; May I Fart in your Mouth?; Staircase Slide; No Bathroom Break | July 3, 2007 | 10 | The second of two best-of episodes for season one. |

=== Season two ===
| Segments | Air Date | Ep # | Notes |
|---|---|---|---|
| ABC gum; wacko wake surfing; Ramona gets Tasered; space invader; Munchie chugs pee | November 7, 2008 | 11 | First episode to air on MavTV. |
| Vegetable-battered women; geisha gangsta; hot shocks; Clem's bull ride; dippin' with Todd | November 14, 2008 | 12 | |
| The panhandler; hot wings face-off; Cash vs. Vasque | November 21, 2008 | 13 | |
| Breakfast bong; fun in burqas; bikini trespassing; lunch bong; open mic night(mare); dinner bong | November 28, 2008 | 14 | |
| All dolled up; belching Ali; balut; waitress on wheels; what would Jesus do | December 5, 2008 | 15 | |
| Mace in the face; prego crowd surf; eating bugs; period stain; brain damage; pepper puss; Munchie eats a toenail | December 12, 2008 | 16 | |
| Security; catwalk catastrophe; Catgirl Munchie; invisible rope; gas station beer bong; sand monster; bay bar follies | December 19, 2008 | 17 | |
| Clem's colostomy bag; red-carpet ribs; ¡Bailamos!; assless ski bibs, senior shuffleboard; Neti Pot | December 26, 2008 | 18 | |

== See also ==
- Dirty Sanchez
- The Dudesons
- Jackass
- The Janoskians
- The Mad Hueys
- The Single Life with Sam Phillips (Rad Girls featured in MavTV Episode 5)
- Tokyo Shock Boys
- Too Stupid to Die
- 1000 Ways to Die
