= Adrenaline Crew =

American stunt team

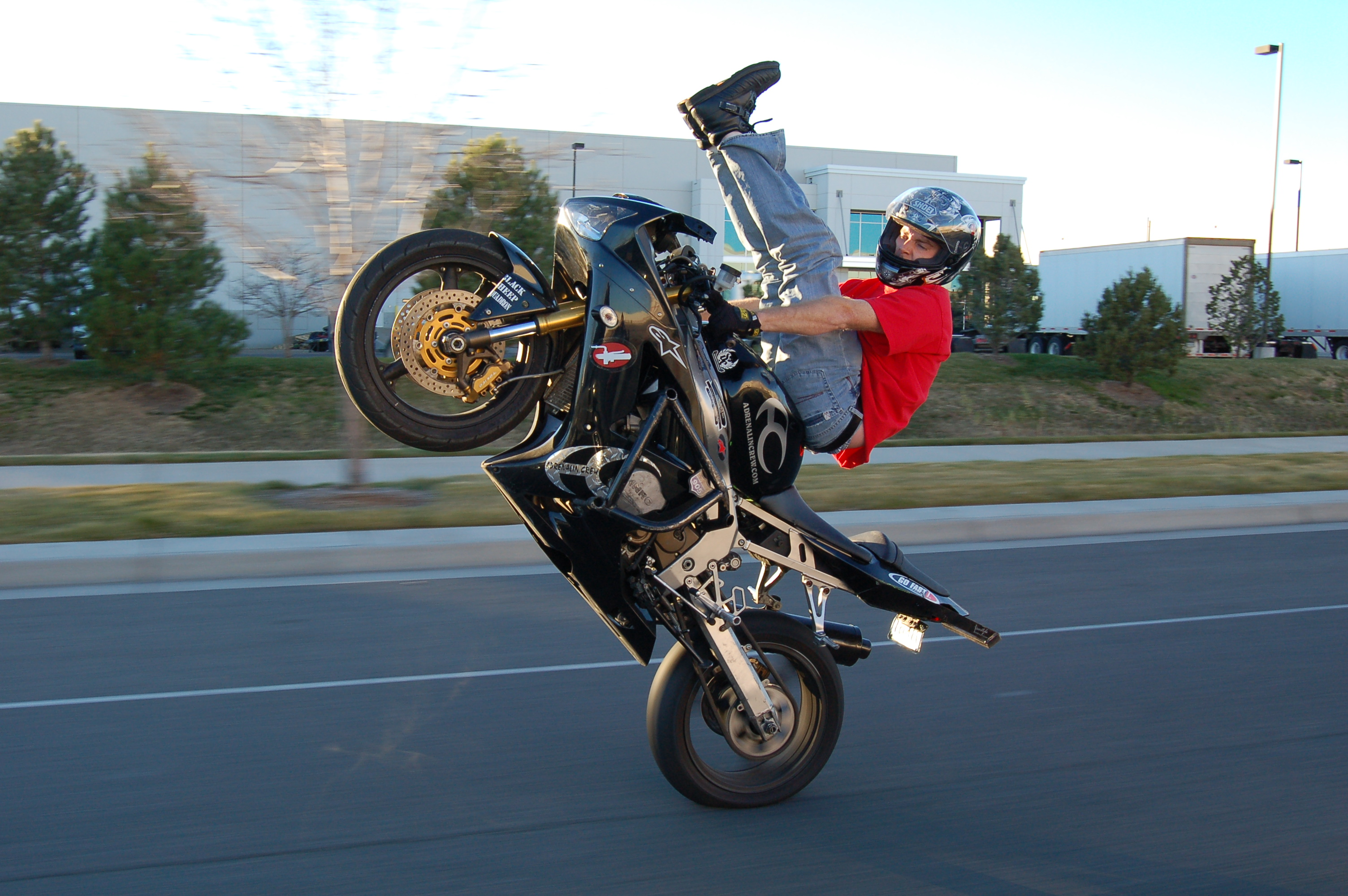
- Greg McGlynn from Adrenaline Crew doing a modified wheelie
- Formation: 2002
- Type: Motorcycle/ automobile stunt team
- Location: Los Angeles, California
- Founder: Kenny Kelley
- Website: www.adrenalinecrew.com
- Formerly called: Adrenalin Crew

Adrenaline Crew (originally spelled Adrenalin Crew, also known as "AC") is an American stunt team that started in Los Angeles, California. The team was originally formed to do film stunts but also created their own series of stunt, skit and prank DVDs featuring riders performing various dangerous motorcycle stunt riding and automobile stunts on public roadways.

== History ==
=== Origins ===
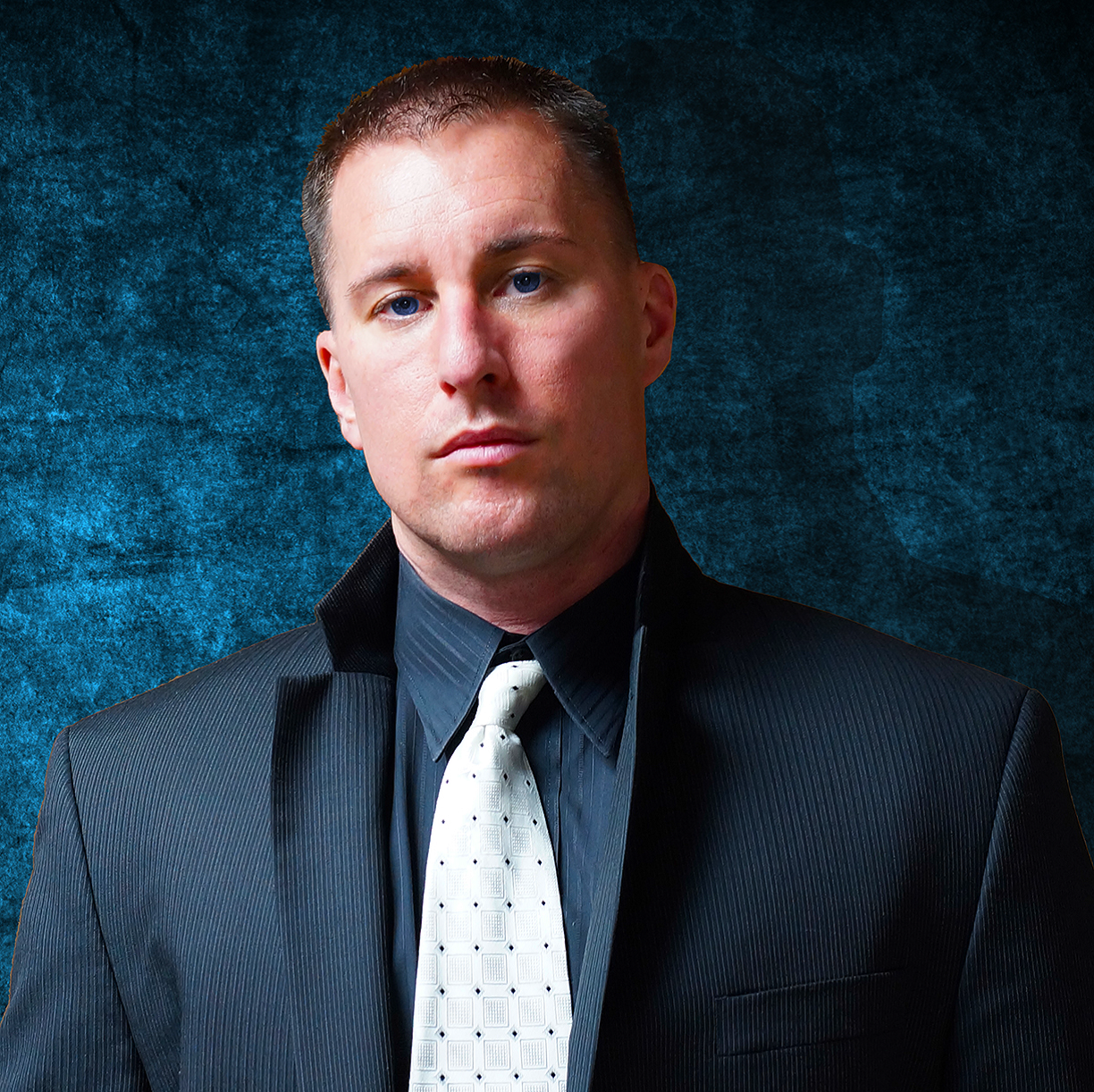
Kenny Kelley

Adrenaline Crew was formed in 2002 by Kenny Kelley in Hollywood, CA. The main focus of the company was to provide actual motorcycle stunt riders to the movie industry.^{(1)} Their first stunt work was in an indie movie titled In The Wrong Hands. ^{(2)}

One of the original members of Adrenaline Crew was Vivid Video's only male contracted adult film star Dale DaBone. Adrenaline Crew performed stunts in the movies Biker Boyz, Fear of Speed, In The Wrong Hands and Torque. They have also done stunt work for numerous independent films as well as some higher budget adult themed films. These movies earned a combined gross of over 80 million US dollars. After the need for motorcycle stunt work had subsided, Dale left Adrenaline Crew.

In 2004, Adrenaline Crew changed their direction. Instead of doing the stunt work for other films, they began filming 'guerilla' style videos themselves (meaning without a valid permit on public roads). Which followed suit to the popular Jackass television show. This got many of the riders into legal trouble, which just helped to build the new 'outlaw' reputation the company was now going after. Other members of the crew have had their licenses revoked several times.^{(4)}

Adrenaline Crew eventually became one of the best known motorcycle organizations in the world and released their first mainstream movie, a Pay Per View special which aired in June 2004. The special was aired on DirecTV and EchoStar and was watched by over 10,000,000 domestic and international viewers.^{(5)}

After the success of the PPV special, Adrenaline Crew was able to secure worldwide distribution for a movie series. Several companies distributed the Adrenaline Crew DVD series overseas including Revolver Entertainment in Europe and Warner Music Group in the United States of America. The crew toured on the Van's Warped Tour to promote the DVDs and brand.^{(6)}

=== Controversy ===
The Adrenaline Crew's rising popularity attracted attention. The television show Inside Edition aired a special investigation citing the dangers surrounding the crew's method of filming and riding calling it 'careless' and 'dangerous' to the general public. Senior Investigative Correspondent Matt Meagher commented in the piece, "It's motorcycle mayhem! They drive on the wrong side of the road, do wheelies, weave in and out of traffic, perform dangerous stunts and terrify people on the road around them. These stunt bikers risk their lives while also putting everyone else on the road in danger." ^{(7)} This upset Kenny Kelley, who had agreed to release some footage for the show so that they could share their side. Inside Edition did not air the scenes where Kenny and the crew stated that they wanted a legal place to do the stunts as well as sanctioned competitions such as the X Games. This portion of the interview was later leaked on the Internet.

Following the Inside Edition investigation, many magazines also focused on the team and their extreme stunt riding. One crew member is quoted saying "Most normal people pull over when they see lights or hear sirens, we immediately drop a gear and hammer it. There isn't a police car out there that can keep up with these bikes, so it's a no-brainier. You have to constantly scan for police. If you see one, run the other way regardless – don't wait for them to find a reason to pull you over. The police are here to f--k you over, so why give them the chance?”^{(8)}

=== Video game series ===
The 2012 smartphone video game series Race Stunt Fight has the characters from Adrenaline Crew's movie series doing tricks while racing and running from the police.

== Films ==
Introduction to Street Bike Insanity

- Released: June 11, 2004
- Distribution: DirecTV, EchoStar
- Info: The one that started it all.

200MPH Jackasses (European Release)

- Released: June 2004
- Distribution: Revolver Entertainment
- Info: UK release of Adrenaline Crew 1. Also included a DVD sampler in the May 2004 issue of SuperBike magazine

100% Illegal

- Released: October 2004
- Distribution: Impact Video, X-factor Video
- Info: The first DVD distributed by Adrenaline Crew

100% Illegal "Director's Cut"

- Released: September 27, 2005
- Distribution: Warner Music Group
- Info: The first mainstream DVD and the first motorcycle stunt DVD to be sold in Best Buy, Trans World Entertainment and Tower Records

Arena Legal

- Released: November 2005
- Distribution: Impact Video Distribution
- Info: Footage of live shows and safety tips. Main focus was to show kids a safer side of this extreme sport.

AC-1 (Australia and New Zealand Version)

- Released: December 2005
- Distribution: Warner Music Australia
- Info: The Australian Version of the first Adrenaline Crew DVD, 100% Illegal.

Awaiting Trial

- Released: October 28, 2006
- Distribution: Warner Music Group
- Info: The second Mainstream DVD release from Adrenaline Crew

All Stacked Up (AC Chicks DVD)

- Released: November 2006
- Distribution: Official website only
- Info: The DVD containing uncensored footage they could not show in the mainstream releases.

Awaiting Trial "Director's Cut"

- Released: January 2007
- Distribution: Impact Video Distribution
- Info: The uncensored version of 'Awaiting Trial'.

The Road Behind

- Released: October 2007
- Distribution: Impact Video Distribution
- Info: A 2-hour documentary.

The Road Behind "Director's Cut"

- Released: May 2008
- Distribution: Official website only
- Info: A remastered version of 'The Road Behind' in High Definition. Also includes 'Arena Legal' and 30 minutes of extra footage. The last DVD including Street Bike Tommy.

Double Disc "Awaiting Trail/The Road Behind" (Australian Version Only)

- Released: March 2009
- Distribution: Beyond Home Entertainment
- Info: Australia's version of the last 2 US titles.

Verdict Guilty

- Released: January 16, 2010
- Distribution: First Look Studios
- Info: After a four-year hiatus, they put out their 4th mainstream DVD.

Verdict Guilty "Director's Cut"

- Released: December 1, 2010
- Distribution: Official website only
- Info: The uncensored version of Verdict Guilty.
