= Jackass Number Two =

2006 American reality comedy film

- Theatrical release poster
- Directed by: Jeff Tremaine
- Based on: Jackass by Johnny Knoxville; Spike Jonze; Jeff Tremaine
- Produced by: Jeff Tremaine; Spike Jonze; Johnny Knoxville
- Starring: Johnny Knoxville; Bam Margera; Steve-O; Chris Pontius; Ryan Dunn; Wee Man; Preston Lacy; Dave England; Danger Ehren
- Cinematography: Dimitry Elyashkevich
- Edited by: Seth Casriel; Matthew Probst; Scott Simmons
- Music by: Sam Spiegel
- Production companies: Dickhouse Productions; Lynch Siderow Productions
- Distributed by: Paramount Pictures; MTV Films
- Release date: September 22, 2006 (United States)
- Running time: 92 minutes
- Country: United States
- Language: English
- Budget: $11.5 million
- Box office: $84.6 million

Jackass Number Two is a 2006 American reality slapstick comedy film directed by Jeff Tremaine, and produced by Tremaine, Spike Jonze, and Johnny Knoxville. It is the sequel to Jackass: The Movie (2002), both based upon the MTV series Jackass. Like its predecessor and the original television show, the film is a compilation of stunts, pranks and skits, starring the regular Jackass cast of Johnny Knoxville, Bam Margera, Dave England, Ryan Dunn, Chris Pontius, Wee Man, Steve-O, Preston Lacy, and Danger Ehren.

Produced by MTV Films, Dickhouse Productions and Lynch Siderow Productions, and distributed by Paramount Pictures, the film premiered in theaters on September 22, 2006, received generally positive reviews from critics and grossed $84.6 million worldwide against a production budget of $11.5 million.

Unused material of the film was released as a separate movie titled Jackass 2.5 online on December 19, 2007, and on DVD on December 26, 2007. It was followed by another sequel, Jackass 3D (2010).

== Synopsis ==
The film opens by introducing the primary cast members while bulls aggressively chase them in a suburban neighborhood, wreaking havoc in the process.

The most notable stunts include: Johnny Knoxville riding a big red rocket which gets launched into the air; Bam Margera being trapped and stuck in a trailer with a king cobra; Dave England riding a giant firehose that launches him into a patch of mud; Ryan Dunn being launched into a garage door while riding a shopping cart; Chris Pontius' penis dressed as a mouse while a snake attempts to bite it; Wee Man getting zapped by an electric stool upon believing that cards are being thrown at him by champion card thrower Jim Karol; Steve-O getting his cheek pierced by a fish hook and getting thrown into the shark-infested Gulf of Mexico; Preston Lacy disguising himself as Bam's father Phil in order to spoon with Bam's mother April in bed; and Ehren McGhehey attempting a loop while riding a pocketbike.

The final stunt is a prank orchestrated by the entire cast and crew on Ehren McGhehey, in which Ehren dresses up as a terrorist along with cinematographer Dimitry Elyashkevich, and the pair take a taxi to the airport, convincing the taxi driver that they are going to commit an act of terrorism. In reality, the driver is actor/film director Jay Chandrasekhar, who becomes violent with Ehren when he attempts to initiate the prank. The taxi then pulls into a vacant lot, where a panicked Ehren is forced into the trunk. The cast and crew who are present for the prank rush to explain to Jay that they are filming a skit for a movie, prompting director and producer Jeff Tremaine to clap two wooden boards together to imitate the sound of gunshots to trick Ehren into thinking Bam has been shot, before Jay gets back into the car to drive in circles. When the car comes to a stop, Ehren is relieved to discover that it is a prank and that he was never in serious danger. However, it is then revealed to Ehren that the beard that was put on him as part of the bit was made up of pubic hair by a majority of the cast and crew, one of whom actually happened to have crabs, after which Ehren gets angry and vomits.

The movie concludes with Johnny Knoxville putting his hand in a bear trap, before transitioning into a performance by the main cast in a Busby Berkeley-style movie musical production number set to the La Cage aux Folles song "The Best of Times", where the guys sing and dance while performing more stunts. After a wrecking ball hits Knoxville, comedian Rip Taylor appears to end the movie much like in the predecessor.

== Cast ==
The entire main cast from Jackass: The Movie returned for the sequel.

- Johnny Knoxville
- Bam Margera
- Chris Pontius
- Steve-O
- Ryan Dunn
- Dave England
- Jason "Wee Man" Acuña
- "Danger Ehren" McGhehey
- Preston Lacy

=== Guest appearances ===
- Brandon DiCamillo
- Brandon Novak
- April Margera, Phil Margera and Jess Margera
- Loomis Fall
- Stephanie Hodge
- Mike Kassak
- Thor Drake
- Predatory animal experts David Weathers and Manny Puig
- Jim Karol
- Mat Hoffman
- Tony Hawk
- Clyde Singleton
- Jason Taylor
- Mark Zupan
- John Waters
- Jay Chandrasekhar
- Ville Valo
- Three 6 Mafia
- Roger Alan Wade
- Rip Taylor
- Luke Wilson
- Willie Garson
- Mike Judge
- Knoxville's daughter Madison can be heard offscreen in the end credits

=== Crew ===
Crew members who appear in this movie:

- Director and producer Jeff Tremaine
- Producer Spike Jonze
- Executive producer Trip Taylor
- Co-producer and cinematographer Dimitry Elyashkevich
- Co-producer and photographer Sean Cliver
- Cameramen Lance Bangs, Rick Kosick, Greg "Guch" Iguchi, Rob "Whitey" McConnaughy and Mark Rackley
- Photographer Ben "Benzo" Kaller
- Sound mixer Cordell Mansfield
- Boom operator Seamus Frawley
- Art director J.P. Blackmon
- Property master Scott Manning

Stunts including Viva La Bam regular Don Vito were also filmed and shown in original trailers. However, due to the scandal surrounding his arrest just prior to the film's release and the nature of the charges against him, all the scenes involving Don Vito were cut late in development.

Notable exceptions to the supporting cast are Raab Himself, who was battling alcoholism and drug addiction at the time, and Rake Yohn, who did however appear in Jackass 2.5. They both were recurring cast members in the Jackass TV show and in the first Jackass movie. Ryan Dunn initially approached Raab to appear in the movie, however, he declined the offer.

== Production ==
Shooting began on January 30, 2006, and ended on June 23, 2006. During filming, the Jackass cast refused to divulge their various locations, out of fear of fans interfering with the filming process. Notable filming locations include India, Australia, England, Moscow and Argentina. A few insights were leaked prior to the movie's release by Steve-O and Bam Margera via Radio Bam and Loveline. Other shootings were Bull Shoals, Arkansas; Key West, Florida; Los Angeles, California; Miami, Florida; New Orleans, Louisiana; New York City, New York; and West Chester, Pennsylvania. Even after completing enough footage for Number Two, Knoxville was so energized by being back together with his friends and shooting again, that he encouraged everyone to stay together and film more stunts (most of which ultimately released with 2.5), willing to even put himself at further risk of injury simply because he didn't want to part with the group so soon.

The infamous stunt "How to Milk a Horse" was originally shot for Wildboyz, but was saved for future use. "The idea to drink the horse semen was not actually planned but was "in the back of everyone's mind." To agree to do the stunt, Chris Pontius asked director Jeff Tremaine for a full day off of work, but discouraged doing so since Pontius had missed work the day before. Additionally, on screen Chris Pontius stated to Jeff Tremaine, "This is going to make up for something bad I'm going to do in the future." This deal was verbally agreed upon and sealed with a handshake; it should also be noted that said deal was videotaped for the camera.

=== Unused scenes ===
Deleted scenes that were also filmed but not included in either the final film or Jackass 2.5 include: "The Lamborghini Tooth Pull" with Don Vito (which would later be performed in Jackass 3D by Ehren McGhehey); "The Human Newton's Cradle", where Preston Lacy, Bam Margera, Phil Margera, Don Vito, and Brandon DiCamillo were the "spheres" for a life size Newton's cradle; "Meatball Sling Shot", where Bam slingshots a meatball in Vito's face (which was also performed by Phil Margera and included in Jackass 2.5); "SWAT Team Wake Up", where a SWAT Team wakes Johnny Knoxville up by blowing the door to his motel room; "Wee Baby", where Wee Man is dressed as a baby and put in a box in an attempt to get shipped out through the mail (which was later redone in Jackass Presents: Bad Grandpa); "Unicycle Hellride", where Steve-O rides a unicycle over hot coals; "Balloon Flight", where Bam has balloons tied to him which causes him to float in the sky, he then uses a pellet gun to shoot the balloons with to slowly descend into a lake; "Bad Butcher", where Dico pretends to be a butcher who messes with the unsuspecting customers; and "Ignited Farts", where Bam, Steve-O, Ryan Dunn, Chris Pontius, and Dave England would get in a bathtub and try to ignite their farts underwater, ending with Dave defecating by accident (this stunt would later be performed by Steve-O in Jackass Forever).

Although they were deleted, some of the deleted scenes are briefly shown in the credits or the making of Jackass Number Two and Jackass 2.5. A short clip of the tooth pull scene appeared in the original trailer for Jackass Number Two, a photo of the human Newton's cradle was released, and the entire "Ignited Farts" sequence was once available on the Jackass World website, but has since disappeared following the website's closure.

== Screenings and release ==
The film had 4 different screenings for fans of Jackass and MySpace users, which was a part of MySpace's "Black Carpet" screening. The screenings took place a few days before the movie was released (possibly August). Some of the screenings also had surprise visits by cast and crew. For example, the Pennsylvania screening had director Jeff Tremaine and cast members Johnny Knoxville and Bam Margera.

On June 15, 2006, Yahoo! released the first official teaser for the movie. The stunts in the trailer included Knoxville riding a "rocket bike" off a ramp and a blindfolded Knoxville being rammed by a yak.

The film was released on DVD on December 26, 2006, in its R-rated version in full and widescreen, and in widescreen in the unrated version.

=== Box office ===
Jackass Number Two opened on September 22, 2006, in 3,900 screens at 3,059 theaters. It debuted at number one on its opening weekend with a total gross of $29 million. On its first day in theaters Jackass Number Two matched its $11.5 million production budget. The film grossed an additional $14 million in its second week. Overall the film made $84.6 million worldwide, nearly $5 million more than the original.

== Reception ==
=== Critical reception ===
Review aggregator website Rotten Tomatoes reports a 66% approval rating from 101 critic reviews; the average rating is 6.00/10. The general consensus reads: "Better than any sequel to the movie of a television show has a right to be, Jackass Number Two dares you not to laugh." On Metacritic, the film has a rating of 66 out of 100 based on 23 critics, indicating "generally favorable" reviews. Audiences polled by CinemaScore gave the film an average grade of "B+" on an A+ to F scale.

The New York Times awarded Jackass Number Two a Critic's Pick, writing, "Debased, infantile and reckless in the extreme, this compendium of body bravado and malfunction makes for some of the most fearless, liberated and cathartic comedy in modern movies." On Ebert & Roeper, Richard Roeper and guest critic Fred Willard gave Jackass Number Two a "Two Thumbs Up" rating.

=== Cast retrospective ===
In 2022, Knoxville described Number Two as "Everyone was on their absolute worst behaviour on and off the screen"; Tremaine called it the "gnarliest" of the series and that the cast was "ready to die" and "the most reckless". While Steve-O claimed that the film was their "masterpiece" and that the cast was in their "peak physical prime", he admitted it was his "rock bottom" as an addict and that he was "legitimately a disaster".

== Soundtrack ==
The soundtrack was released on September 26, 2006, by Bulletproof Records. The soundtrack features songs that were featured in the movie, and various audio clips from the movie. Among the new songs included in the soundtrack are "Gettin' Fucked Up" – a collaboration between rap group Three Six Mafia (who themselves briefly appear in the film) and Josey Scott, lead singer of heavy metal band Saliva – and "Backass" – a collaboration between electroclash musician Peaches and Karen O, lead singer of the indie rock trio Yeah Yeah Yeahs.

== Home media ==
The Rated and Unrated DVD versions of the movie were released on December 26, 2006. The rated version includes the 96 minute theatrical release, with bonus features, and the unrated includes some extended scenes that were shortened in the theatrical version of the movie. Both DVDs feature commentary by the cast (with the exception of Bam Margera), director and producer Jeff Tremaine, and co-producer and cinematographer Dimitry Elyashkevich. The DVD also included 16 deleted scenes removed from the theatrical release, more than 20 additional scenes, 9 TV spots, 8 promotional spots including the theatrical trailer, gag reel, the uncensored version of Karazy by Chris Pontius and a promotional commercial for the 2006 VMAs. The Making of Jackass Number Two featurette is also featured on the DVD.

== Jackass 2.5 ==
Jackass 2.5 was a direct-to-home media version with additional footage (in this case, both intentionally for 2.5 and footage they were unable to include for Number Two). It was released to the Internet at Blockbuster.com and Hulu as a free screening on December 19–31, 2007, and to DVD on December 26, 2007. It includes special features such as the making of Jackass 2.5, the making of Jackass: The Game, deleted scenes, photo gallery, and additional footage.

The most notable bits include: Johnny Knoxville getting a prostate exam and trying to donate sperm at a clinic in Russia; Bam Margera flying a kite out of his anus with anal beads; toy airplanes attacking Preston Lacy while he is painted as King Kong; Dave England and Ehren McGhehey boxing with after getting violently spun on office chairs; Wee Man bullfighting against a calf; a snapping turtle biting Chris Pontius on the nose; Steve-O drinking beer off Shridhar Chillal's nails; Ryan Dunn and Bam getting golf balls teed off of them, and members of the Jackass team going through a Cajun obstacle course with alligators, pigs, paintball shots, and spittoon drinking.

== Sequel ==
Paramount Pictures, and MTV Films greenlit a third Jackass film, which was shot in 3D. Filming began in January 2010, and Jackass 3D was theatrically released on October 15, 2010.
