= Half Pint Brawlers =

American wrestling company and television series

Half Pint Brawlers is an American wrestling company with an eponymous television series. The company is considered the top midget wrestling company in the country.

Known for controversy and also for their hardcore wrestling style, they often use staple guns, thumb tacks, broken bottles, and barbed wire in their matches. Half Pint Brawlers had a fraternity kicked off campus for one of their politically incorrect shows, and have been banned from performing in certain states.

Half Pint Brawlers is headed by Puppet, "The Psycho Dwarf". (Note: Stevie Lee, 54, American professional wrestler and actor (Puppet the Psycho Dwarf, The Babe, Oz the Great and Powerful ) who died on September 12, 2020. He also appeared in Jackass 3D.) Little Kato, "The Dwarf Destroyer", is the veteran of the group; notably, he nearly dies in the first episode. Beautiful Bobby is Kato's long-haired brother, known for his high-flying style. Turtle is the rookie of the group and the fellow emcee. Madd Mexx is known as "The Immigration Sensation". Teo is the smallest Extreme Athlete at 3 feet 10 inches (117 cm) tall, and causes the most problems. Spyder Nate Webb is the only tall individual in the Half Pint Brawlers group; he acts as the announcer.

In 2010, Spike TV aired the first season of the Half Pint Brawlers, during which the Brawlers performed shows at a maximum security prison, on Bourbon Street, at a redneck festival, and with luchadores in Mexico. The show was produced by the Lumberjack Crew and Idea Factory.

The show drew controversy; the Little People of America objected to the Brawlers' repeated use of the word midget and attempted to have the show canceled. TMZ followed the controversy and covered the Brawlers' use of the word.

The Half Pint Brawlers made an appearance in a skit for the 2010 Paramount Pictures comedy documentary Jackass 3D, where Jason Acuña a.k.a. "Wee Man" gets into a bar fight with some of the members after one of them finds him at a bar with his girlfriend (played by Terra Jolé).

On September 9, 2020, the founder of the Half Pint Brawlers, Stevie Lee Richardson, also known as Puppet The Psycho Dwarf, died at his home in Illinois.
