= April Margera =

American reality television personality (born 1956)

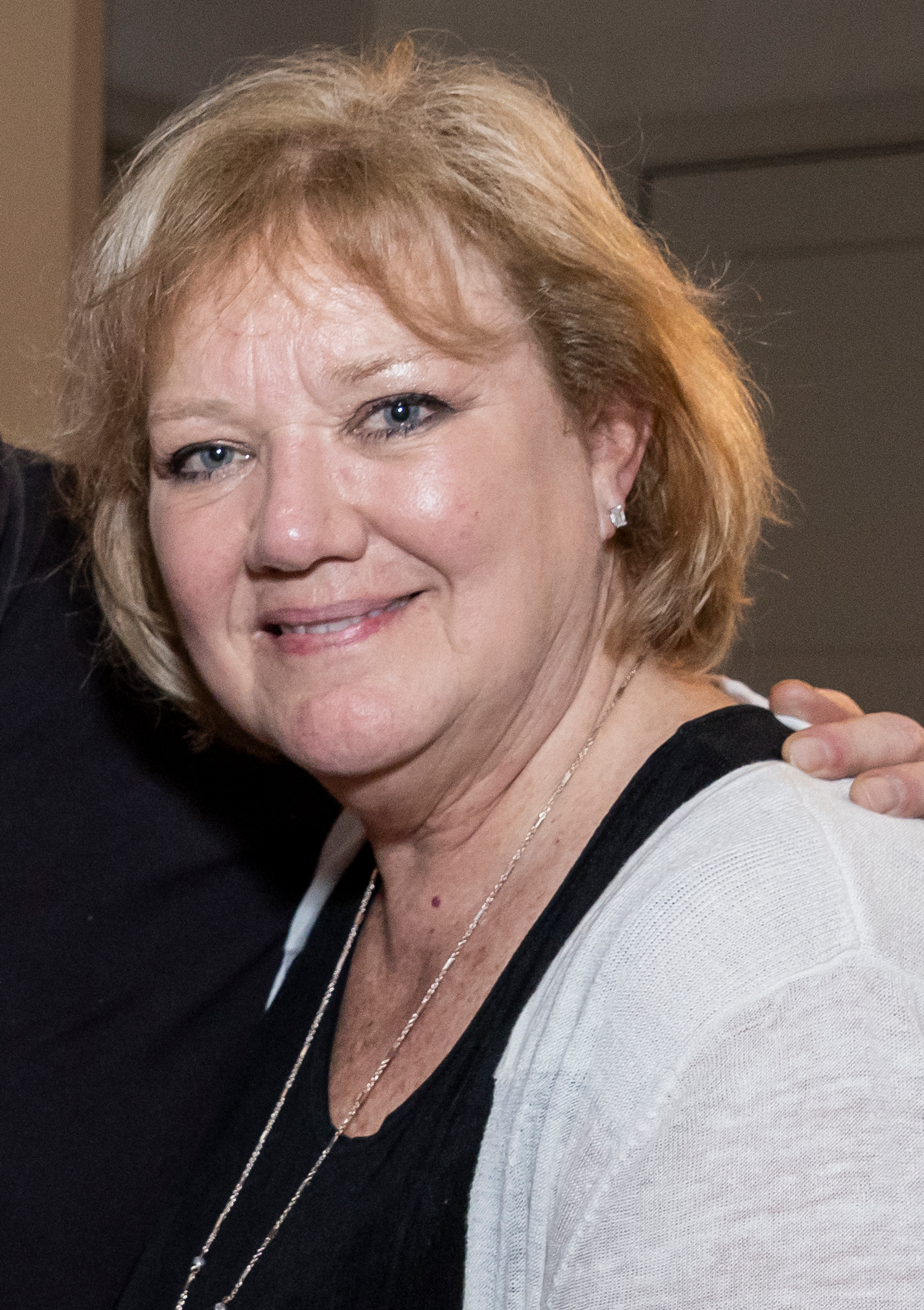
- Margera in 2022
- Born: March 28, 1956 (age 70)
- Occupation: Television personality
- Years active: 1999–present
- Known for: Jackass; Viva La Bam
- Spouse: Phil Margera (m. 1976)
- Children: Jess Margera; Bam Margera
- Relatives: Vincent Margera (brother-in-law)

April Margera (born March 28, 1956) is an American reality television personality who has appeared on MTV's Viva La Bam and Jackass, as well as the CKY videos, Haggard, Minghags and Bam's Unholy Union. She is the mother of CKY drummer Jesse Margera and Jackass star and professional skateboarder Bam Margera.

== Biography ==
Margera married her husband Phil in 1976, and together they are the parents of skateboarder and former Jackass star Bam Margera and CKY drummer Jess Margera. She is a trained hairdresser.

In 2006, she published a cookbook entitled April Cooks: There's an Alligator in My Kitchen, a reference to a prank at her expense in Jackass: The Movie.

In December 2011, Margera opened the Rose Hip Barn in Thornton, Pennsylvania, a store selling purses, accessories, and refurbished furniture.

In March 2016, April and Bam appeared on the VH1 reality television show Family Therapy with Dr. Jenn to work on their relationship and confront Bam's alcoholism.

== Filmography ==
=== Film ===
Year	Film	Role	Notes
1999	Landspeed: CKY	Herself	Direct-to-video
2000	CKY2K	Herself	Direct-to-video
2001	CKY 3	Herself	Direct-to-video
2001	CKY Documentary	Herself	Direct-to-video
2002	Jackass: The Movie	Herself	Guest appearances
2002	CKY4: The Latest & Greatest	Herself	Direct-to-video
2003	Haggard: The Movie	Lady in coffee shop	Cameo; Uncredited
2006	The Dudesons Movie	Herself	Guest appearances
2006	Jackass Number Two	Herself	Guest appearances
2007	Jackass 2.5	Herself	Guest appearances
2008	Bam Margera Presents: Where the #$&% Is Santa?	Herself	Direct-to-video
2009	Minghags	Libby's mom	Also makeup artist
2010	Jackass 3D	Herself	Guest appearances
2011	Jackass 3.5	Herself	Guest appearances
2011	Skittin Across America: Skit-A-Palooza	Herself	
2017	The Fast Food King	Herself	Documentary; Unreleased
2022	Humanity Stoked	Herself	Documentary
2026	Jackass: Best and Last	Herself	Archive footage

=== Television ===
Year	Film	Role	Notes
2000–2001	Jackass	Herself	10 episodes Guest appearances
2002	MTV Cribs	Herself	1 episode
2002	Jackass Backyard BBQ	Herself	TV special Guest appearance
2003–2006	Viva La Bam	Herself	42 episodes
2005	Celebrity Fit Club	Herself	2 episodes Guest appearances
2005	2005 MTV Video Music Awards	Herself	Guest appearance
2006	The Dudesons	Herself	2 episodes Guest appearances
2007	Bam's Unholy Union	Herself	9 episodes
2008	Jackassworld.com: 24 Hour Takeover	Herself	TV special Guest appearances
2008	Bamimation	Herself (voice)	TV short
2009	Steve-O: Demise and Rise	Herself	TV documentary
2011	A Tribute to Ryan Dunn	Herself	TV documentary
2014	CKY: The Greatest Hits	Herself	TV special
2016	Family Therapy with Dr. Jenn	Herself	2 episodes
2017	Epicly Later'd: Bam Margera	Herself	TV documentary
2018	Drunk History: Germany	Herself	TV special
2019	Dr. Phil	Herself	Episode 18.1

=== Web series ===
Year	Title	Role	Notes
2019	Bathroom Break Podcast	Herself	Podcast; 1 episode
2023	The Nine Club	Herself	Podcast; 1 episode
2026	Fishtank	Herself	Guest appearance
