= Phil Margera =

American reality television personality (born 1957)

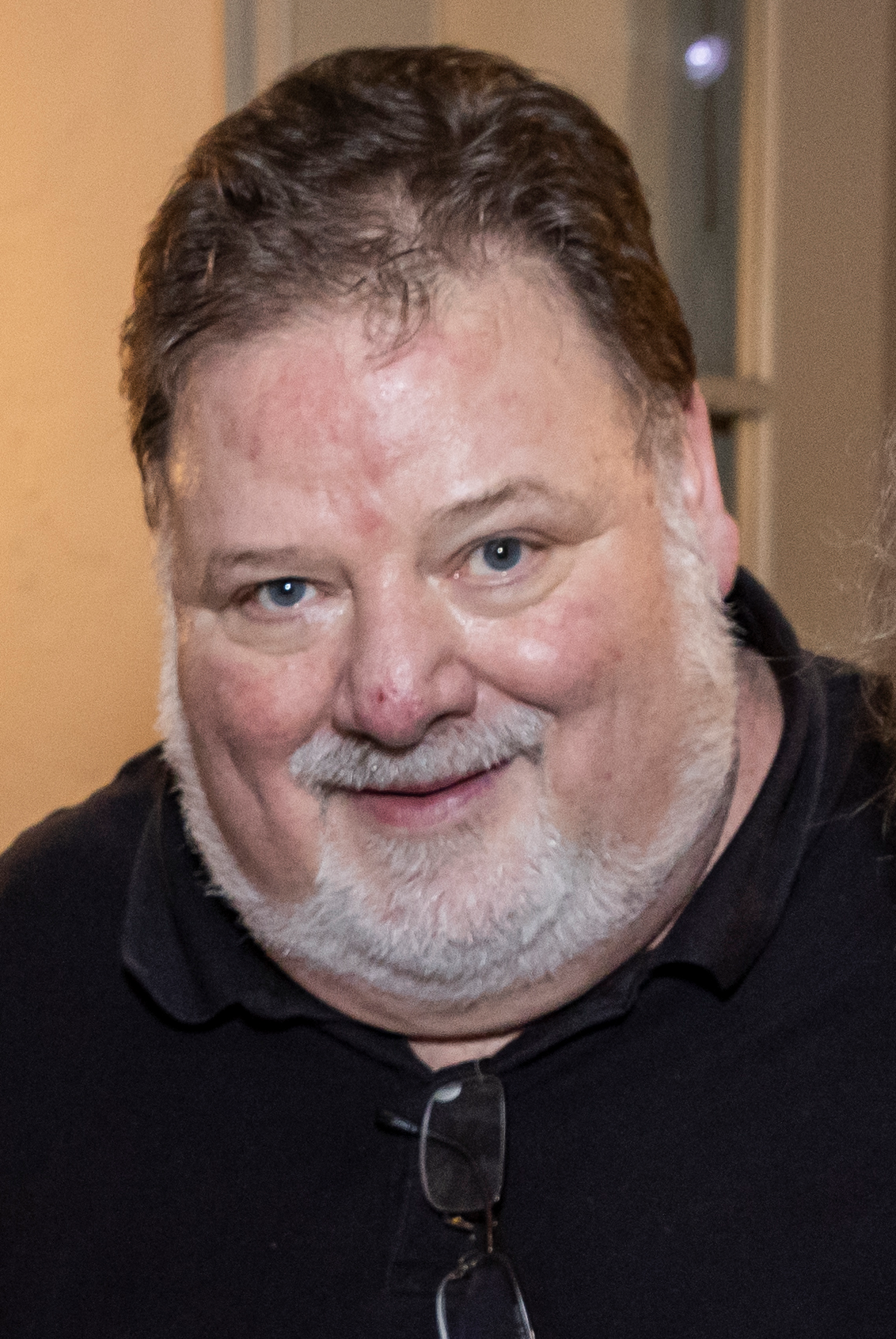
- Margera in 2022
- Born: July 13, 1957 (age 69)
- Occupation: Television personality
- Years active: 1998–present
- Known for: Jackass; Viva La Bam
- Spouse: April Margera (m. 1976)
- Children: Jess Margera; Bam Margera
- Relatives: Vincent Margera (brother)

Phil Margera (born July 13, 1957) is an American reality television personality known for appearing on reality series Viva La Bam, the CKY videos and the Jackass television series and movies. He is the father of CKY drummer Jesse Margera and Jackass star and professional skateboarder Bam Margera.

== Biography ==
Margera married his wife April in 1976. Margera worked as a baker prior to his career in television.

He first appeared on film in the CKY series of videos, and was subsequently featured on Jackass. He was also in the main cast of Viva La Bam. On television, Margera is depicted as kind, gentle, easy going and quiet, whereas his brother Vincent "Don Vito" Margera was portrayed as loud and obnoxious. Margera appeared as himself in the 2004 video game Tony Hawk's Underground 2 alongside several other Jackass cast members.

== Filmography ==
=== Films ===
Year	Title	Role	Notes
1998	Toy Machine: Jump Off A Building	Himself	Direct-to-video
1999	Landspeed: CKY	Himself	Direct-to-video
2000	CKY2K	Himself	Direct-to-video
2001	CKY 3	Himself	Direct-to-video
2001	CKY Documentary	Himself	Direct-to-video
2002	Jackass: The Movie	Himself	Guest appearances
2002	CKY4: The Latest & Greatest	Himself	Direct-to-video
2003	Haggard: The Movie	Fat Guy with Watermelon / Bakery Shop Owner	
2006	The Dudesons Movie	Himself	Guest appearances
2006	Jackass Number Two	Himself	Guest appearances
2007	Jackass 2.5	Himself	Guest appearances
2008	Bam Margera Presents: Where the #$&% Is Santa?	Himself	Direct-to-video
2009	Minghags	Lenny's dad	
2010	Jackass 3D	Himself	Guest appearances
2011	Jackass 3.5	Himself	Guest appearances
2011	Skittin Across America: Skit-A-Palooza	Himself	
2017	The Fast Food King	Himself	Documentary
2026	Jackass: Best and Last	Himself	Archive footage

=== Television ===
Year	Title	Role	Notes
2000–2001	Jackass	Himself	11 episodes Guest appearances
2002	Jackass Backyard BBQ	Himself	TV special Guest appearances
2002	MTV Cribs	Himself	1 episode
2003–2006	Viva La Bam	Himself	42 episodes
2005	Celebrity Fit Club	Himself	2 episodes
2005	2005 MTV Video Music Awards	Himself	Guest appearance
2006	The Dudesons	Himself	2 episodes Guest appearances
2007	Bam's Unholy Union	Himself	6 episodes
2008	Jackassworld.com: 24 Hour Takeover	Himself	TV special Guest appearances
2008	Bamimation	Himself (voice)	TV short
2009	Steve-O: Demise and Rise	Himself	TV documentary
2011	A Tribute to Ryan Dunn	Himself	TV documentary
2014	CKY: The Greatest Hits	Himself	TV special
2016	Family Therapy with Dr. Jenn	Himself	2 episodes
2017	Epicly Later'd: Bam Margera	Himself	TV documentary
2018	Drunk History: Germany	Himself	TV special

=== Web series ===
Year	Title	Role	Notes
2019	Bathroom Break Podcast	Himself	Podcast; 1 episode
2023	The Nine Club	Himself	Podcast; 1 episode
2026	Fishtank	Himself	Guest appearance

== Video games ==
Year	Title	Role	Notes
2004	Tony Hawk's Underground 2	Himself	Voice
