= Vincent Margera =

American television personality (1956–2015)

- Margera in a 2004 episode of Viva La Bam
- Born: Vincent Roy Margera; July 3, 1956; Chester, Pennsylvania, U.S.
- Died: November 15, 2015 (aged 59); West Chester, Pennsylvania, U.S.
- Other name: Don Vito
- Occupation: Television personality
- Years active: 2000–2009
- Known for: Viva La Bam
- Relatives: Phil Margera (brother); Bam Margera (nephew); Jess Margera (nephew); April Margera (sister-in-law)

Vincent Roy Margera (July 3, 1956 – November 15, 2015), better known as Don Vito, was an American reality television personality. He was known for his appearances in Viva La Bam and the CKY series alongside his nephew Bam and brother Phil.

== Early life and career ==
Margera was born in Chester, Pennsylvania, the son of Darlene and Phillip Margera Sr. He first appeared in sketches and videos with his family in the CKY video series, and was later a regular cast member of Viva La Bam.

In early 2007, Margera featured in Redman's music video "Put It Down," in which he plays a police officer with Donnell Rawlings. March 20, 2007, saw the release of Vito and Ryan Dunn starring in a Viva La Bam-like direct-to-DVD film titled Dunn and Vito's Rock Tour.

== Sexual assault conviction ==
On August 18, 2006, Margera was arrested at the Colorado Mills Mall in Lakewood, Colorado, on suspicion of inappropriately touching two 12-year-old girls. He was released after posting bail of $50,000. Margera retained Pamela Mackey as his attorney, who had defended Kobe Bryant in his 2003–2005 sexual assault case.

The trial started on October 22, 2007 in Golden, Colorado. Mackey argued that her client had been playing his "goofy, outrageous and vulgar" television persona for the girls, portraying Margera as a "benign bumbler," and arguing that his signature arm movement may have been mistaken for breast fondling. Margera was found guilty of two counts of sexual assault on a minor and acquitted on one count. In December 2007, he was sentenced to 10 years of probation, and ordered to register as a sex offender, receive an evaluation of his mental health, and seek treatment for his alcoholism.

As a result of his arrest, Margera's appearances were removed from the theatrical and DVD release of Jackass Number Two.

== Death ==
Margera, who suffered from obesity and alcoholism, collapsed at his home in October 2015. After falling into a coma, he died on November 15, 2015, in West Chester, Pennsylvania, at the age of 59. The cause of death was liver and kidney failure.

== Filmography ==
=== Films ===
Year	Title	Role	Notes
2000	CKY2K	Himself	Direct-to-video release
2002	CKY4: The Latest & Greatest	Himself	Direct-to-video release
2003	Haggard: The Movie	Don Vito	
2005	"Hitch"	Himself	Direct-to-video-documentary
2005	The Dudesons Movie	Himself	Guest appearance
2006	Jackass Number Two	Himself	Scenes deleted
2007	Jackass 2.5	Himself	Scenes deleted
2008	Dunn & Vito's Rock Tour	Himself	Direct-to-video release
2009	Minghags	Various	

=== Television ===
Year	Title	Role	Notes
2001	Jackass	Himself	Episode 2.3; Cameo
2003–2006	Viva La Bam	Himself	43 episodes
2005	Totally Busted	Himself	2 episodes
2005	Stankervision	Himself	Episode 1.5
2005	2005 MTV Video Music Awards	Himself	Guest appearance
2006	The Dudesons	Himself	Episode 1.7; Guest appearance
2007	Bam's Unholy Union	Himself	Episode 1.9; Uncredited
2014	CKY: The Greatest Hits	Himself	Archive footage TV special
2017	Epicly Later'd: Bam Margera	Himself	Archive footage

=== Music videos ===
Year	Artist	Track	Role	Notes
2004	Clutch	"The Mob Goes Wild"	Himself	
2007	Redman	"Put It Down"	Police officer	
