= List of celebrities portrayed in video games =

This is a list of celebrities including actors, musicians, sportspeople and others who have been portrayed in video games.

Celebrity	Video game	Band or Profession	Year	Portrayed by themselves	Playable characters	Ref.
Bruce Lee	Bruce Lee; Bruce Lee Lives; Dragon: The Bruce Lee Story; Bruce Lee: Quest of the Dragon; Bruce Lee: Return of the Legend; Bruce Lee: Iron Fist 3D	Martial artist, actor	1984; 1989; 1993; 2002; 2003; 2008		check	
Daley Thompson	Daley Thompson's Decathlon	Decathlete	1984	check	check	
Mike Tyson	Mike Tyson's Punch-Out!! Mike Tyson: Main Event (iPhone, created by RockLive)	Boxer	1987			
Michael Jackson	Michael Jackson's Moonwalker	Singer/Songwriter	1990		check	
Shaquille O'Neal	Shaq-Fu Fortnite Battle Royale	Basketball player	1994 2024	check	check	
Michael Jordan	Michael Jordan: Chaos in the Windy City	Basketball player	1995		check	
Bill Nye the Science Guy	Bill Nye: The Science Guy - Stop the Rock!	Media Personality	1996	check		
Geri Halliwell	Spice World	Singer	1998	check		
Melanie C	Spice World	Singer	1998	check		
Victoria Beckham	Spice World	Fashion Designer, Singer	1998	check		
Mel B	Spice World Dancing with the Stars: We Dance!	TV Personality, Singer	1998 2008	check		
RZA	Wu-Tang: Shaolin Style	Wu-Tang Clan	1999		check	
Method Man	Wu-Tang: Shaolin Style	Wu-Tang Clan	1999		check	
GZA	Wu-Tang: Shaolin Style	Wu-Tang Clan	1999		check	
Ol' Dirty Bastard	Wu-Tang: Shaolin Style	Wu-Tang Clan	1999		check	
Inspectah Deck	Wu-Tang: Shaolin Style	Wu-Tang Clan	1999		check	
Raekwon	Wu-Tang: Shaolin Style	Wu-Tang Clan	1999		check	
Ghostface Killah	Wu-Tang: Shaolin Style Def Jam Vendetta Def Jam: Fight for NY Def Jam: Icon	Wu-Tang Clan	1999 2003 2004 2007	check	check	
Masta Killa	Wu-Tang: Shaolin Style	Wu-Tang Clan	1999		check	
U-God	Wu-Tang: Shaolin Style	Wu-Tang Clan	1999		check	
Method Man	Wu-Tang: Shaolin Style Def Jam Vendetta	Wu-Tang Clan	1999 2003	check	check	
Drew Carey	The Sims: House Party (cameo)	Actor, comedian	2001			
Britney Spears	Britney's Dance Beat Britney Spears: American Dream	Singer	2002 2016	check		
Anna Nicole Smith	Celebrity Deathmatch	Model, Actress, Media Personality	2003	check	check	
Busta Ryhmes	Celebrity Deathmatch	Rapper	2003	check	check	
Carmen Electra	Celebrity Deathmatch	Actress, Model	2003	check	check	
Carrot Top	Celebrity Deathmatch	Comedian	2003	check	check	
Cindy Margolis	Celebrity Deathmatch	Model	2003	check	check	
Dennis Rodman	Celebrity Deathmatch	Basketball Player	2003	check	check	
Jerry Springer	Celebrity Deathmatch	TV Personality	2003	check	check	
Marilyn Manson	Celebrity Deathmatch	Musician	2003	check	check	
Mr. T	Celebrity Deathmatch	Actor	2003	check	check	
Miss Cleo	Celebrity Deathmatch	TV Personality	2003	check	check	
Ron Jeremy	Celebrity Deathmatch	Adult Film Actor	2003	check	check	
Shannen Doherty	Celebrity Deathmatch	Actor	2003	check	check	
Tommy Lee	Celebrity Deathmatch	Mötley Crüe	2003	check	check	
Chris Kirkpatrick	Celebrity Deathmatch	NSYNC	2003	check	check	
JC Chasez	Celebrity Deathmatch	NSYNC	2003	check	check	
Joey Fatone	Celebrity Deathmatch Dancing with the Stars: We Dance!	NSYNC	2003 2008	check	check	
Justin Timberlake	Celebrity Deathmatch	NSYNC	2003	check	check	
Lance Bass	Celebrity Deathmatch	NSYNC	2003	check	check	
Christina Aguilera	The Sims: Superstar (cameo)	Singer; songwriter; actress; television personality	2003			
Gary Coleman	Postal²	Actor	2003	check		
Snoop Dogg	True Crime: Streets of LA	Rapper, actor	2003			
Capone	Def Jam Vendetta Def Jam: Fight for NY	Rapper	2003 2004	check	check	
Dabo	Def Jam Vendetta	Rapper	2003	check	check	
DMX	Def Jam Vendetta	Rapper	2003	check	check	
Funkmaster Flex	Def Jam Vendetta Def Jam: Icon	Rapper	2003 2007	check	check	
Joe Budden	Def Jam Vendetta Def Jam: Fight for NY	Rapper	2003 2004	check	check	
Keith Murray	Def Jam Vendetta	Rapper	2003	check	check	
Ludacris	Def Jam Vendetta Def Jam: Fight for NY Def Jam: Icon	Rapper	2003 2004 2007	check	check	
N.O.R.E.	Def Jam Vendetta Def Jam: Fight for NY	Rapper	2003 2004	check	check	
Redman	Def Jam Vendetta True Crime: New York City Def Jam: Icon	Rapper, actor	2003 2005 2007	check	check	
Scarface	Def Jam Vendetta Def Jam: Fight for NY	Rapper	2004	check	check	
WC	Def Jam Vendetta	Rapper	2004	check	check	
Fred Durst	Fight Club	Limp Bizkit	2004	check	check	
Jesse James	Tony Hawk's Underground 2	Television celebrity	2004	check	check	
Steve-O	Tony Hawk's Underground 2	Television celebrity, stuntman, comedian	2004	check	check	
Phil Margera	Tony Hawk's Underground 2	Television celebrity	2004	check	check	
Carmen Electra	Def Jam: Fight for NY Playboy: The Mansion	Model, actress	2004 2005	check	check	
Jacob Arabo	Def Jam: Fight for NY	Businessman	2004	check		
Erick Sermon	Def Jam: Fight for NY	Rapper	2004	check	check	
Flavor Flav	Def Jam: Fight for NY	Rapper	2004	check	check	
Freeway	Def Jam: Fight for NY	Rapper	2004	check	check	
Henry Rollins	Def Jam: Fight for NY	Singer	2004	check	check	
Kimora Lee Simmons	Def Jam: Fight for NY	Fashion Designer, Model	2004	check	check	
Memphis Bleek	Def Jam: Fight for NY	Rapper	2004	check	check	
Shawnna	Def Jam: Fight for NY	Rapper	2004	check	check	
Sticky Fingaz	Def Jam: Fight for NY	Rapper	2004	check	check	
Chris Lighty	Def Jam: Fight for NY	Industry Executive	2004	check	check	
David Banner	Def Jam: Fight for NY	Rapper	2004	check	check	
Bone Crusher	Def Jam: Fight for NY	Rapper	2004	check	check	
Bubba Sparxxx	Def Jam: Fight for NY	Rapper	2004	check	check	
Crazy Legs	Def Jam: Fight for NY	Professional Breakdancer	2004	check	check	
Elephant Man	Def Jam: Fight for NY	Dancehall Musician	2004	check	check	
Havoc	Def Jam: Fight for NY	Mobb Deep	2004	check	check	
Ice-T	Def Jam: Fight for NY	Rapper, Actor	2004	check	check	
Lil' Kim	Def Jam: Fight for NY	Rapper	2004	check	check	
Lil' Flip	Def Jam: Fight for NY	Rapper	2004	check	check	
Mack 10	Def Jam: Fight for NY	Rapper	2004	check	check	
Prodigy	Def Jam: Fight for NY	Rapper	2004	check	check	
Omar Epps	Def Jam: Fight for NY	Rapper	2004	check	check	
Sean Paul	Def Jam: Fight for NY Def Jam: Icon	Dancehall Musician	2004 2007	check	check	
Slick Rick	Def Jam: Fight for NY	Rapper	2004	check	check	
Warren G	Def Jam: Fight for NY	Rapper	2004	check	check	
Xzibit	Def Jam: Fight for NY	Rapper	2004	check	check	
Hugh Hefner	Playboy: The Mansion	Businessman, TV celebrity	2005			
Tom Arnold	Playboy: The Mansion	Actor, comedian	2005			
50 Cent	50 Cent: Bulletproof; 50 Cent: Blood on the Sand	Rapper, actor	2005; 2008	check	check	
Phil Collins	Grand Theft Auto: Vice City Stories	Singer/Songwriter	2006	check		
Big Boi	Def Jam: Icon	Outkast	2007	check	check	
Bun B	Def Jam: Icon	Rapper	2007	check	check	
E-40	Def Jam: Icon	Rapper	2007	check	check	
Jim Jones	Def Jam: Icon	Rapper	2007	check	check	
Kano	Def Jam: Icon	Rapper	2007	check	check	
Lil Jon	Def Jam: Icon	Rapper	2007	check	check	
Mike Jones	Def Jam: Icon	Rapper	2007	check	check	
Paul Wall	Def Jam: Icon	Rapper	2007	check	check	
T.I.	Def Jam: Icon	Rapper	2007	check	check	
Tego Calderón	Def Jam: Icon	Rapper	2007	check	check	
The Game	Def Jam: Icon	Rapper	2007	check	check	
Jeezy	Def Jam: Icon	Rapper	2007	check	check	
Fat Joe	Def Jam: Icon	Rapper	2007	check	check	
Johnny Nuñez	Def Jam: Icon	Photographer	2007	check	check	
Melyssa Ford	Def Jam: Icon	Media Personality, Model	2007	check		
Russell Simmons	Def Jam: Icon	Record Executive	2007	check		
Kevin Liles	Def Jam: Icon	Record Executive	2007	check		
Mayra Verónica	Def Jam: Icon	Singer	2007	check		
Tom Morello	Guitar Hero III: Legends of Rock	Rage Against the Machine, Audioslave	2007	check	check	
Bret Michaels	Guitar Hero III: Legends of Rock	Poison, Bret Michaels Band	2007	check	check	
Slash	Guitar Hero III: Legends of Rock	Guns N' Roses, Velvet Revolver	2007	check	check	
Wee Man	Jackass: The Game	Actor	2007	check	check	
Gordon Ramsay	Hell's Kitchen: The Game Restaurant Dash with Gordon Ramsay	Celebrity Chef	2008 2016	check		
Derek Hough	Dancing with the Stars: We Dance!	TV Personality, Dancer	2008	check	check	
Julianne Hough	Dancing with the Stars: We Dance!	TV Personality, Dancer	2008	check	check	
Drew Lachey	Dancing with the Stars: We Dance!	Singer	2008	check	check	
Cheryl Burke	Dancing with the Stars: We Dance!	TV Personality, Dancer	2008	check	check	
Anna Trebunskaya	Dancing with the Stars: We Dance!	Professional Dancer	2008	check	check	
Maksim Chmerkovskiy	Dancing with the Stars: We Dance!	Professional Dancer	2008	check	check	
Jennie Garth	Dancing with the Stars: We Dance!	Actor	2008	check	check	
Apolo Anton Ohno	Dancing with the Stars: We Dance!	Short Track Speed Skater	2008	check	check	
Karina Smirnoff	Dancing with the Stars: We Dance!	Professional Dancer	2008	check	check	
Chelsie Hightower	Dancing with the Stars: We Dance!	Professional Dancer	2008	check	check	
Sabrina Bryan	Dancing with the Stars: We Dance!	Actor, Singer	2008	check	check	
Mark Cuban	Dancing with the Stars: We Dance!	Businessman	2008	check	check	
Edyta Sliwinska	Dancing with the Stars: We Dance!	Professional Dancer	2008	check	check	
Mark Ballas	Dancing with the Stars: We Dance!	Professional Dancer	2008	check	check	
Kym Johnson	Dancing with the Stars: We Dance!	Professional Dancer	2008	check	check	
Louis van Amstel	Dancing with the Stars: We Dance!	Professional Dancer	2008	check	check	
Jane Seymour	Dancing with the Stars: We Dance!	Actor	2008	check	check	
Hélio Castroneves	Dancing with the Stars: We Dance!	Racing Driver	2008	check	check	
Tony Dovolani	Dancing with the Stars: We Dance!	Professional Dancer	2008	check	check	
Cameron Mathison	Dancing with the Stars: We Dance!	Actor	2008	check	check	
Mark Dacascos	Iron Chef America: Supreme Cuisine	Actor, TV Personality	2008	check		
Alton Brown	Iron Chef America: Supreme Cuisine	TV Personality	2008	check		
Mario Batali	Iron Chef America: Supreme Cuisine	Celebrity Chef	2008	check	check	
Masaharu Morimoto	Iron Chef America: Supreme Cuisine	Celebrity Chef	2008	check	check	
Cat Cora	Iron Chef America: Supreme Cuisine	Celebrity Chef	2008	check	check	
Ricky Gervais	Grand Theft Auto IV	Comedian, actor	2008			
Katt Williams	Grand Theft Auto IV	Comedian, actor	2008	check		
Steven Tyler	Revolution X Guitar Hero: Aerosmith	Aerosmith	1994 2008	check	check	
Joe Perry	Revolution X Guitar Hero: Aerosmith	Aerosmith	1994 2008	check	check	
Joey Kramer	Revolution X Guitar Hero: Aerosmith	Aerosmith	1994 2008	check	check	
Brad Whitford	Revolution X Guitar Hero: Aerosmith	Aerosmith	1994 2008	check	check	
Tom Hamilton	Revolution X Guitar Hero: Aerosmith	Aerosmith	1994 2008	check	check	
D.M.C.	Guitar Hero: Aerosmith	Run–D.M.C.	2008	check	check	
Jimi Hendrix	Guitar Hero World Tour	The Jimi Hendrix Experience, Jimi Hendrix	2008	check	check	
Ozzy Osbourne	Guitar Hero World Tour	Black Sabbath, Ozzy Osbourne	2008	check	check	
Billy Corgan	Guitar Hero World Tour	The Smashing Pumpkins	2008	check	check	
Ted Nugent	Guitar Hero World Tour	Ted Nugent	2008	check	check	
Travis Barker	Guitar Hero World Tour	Blink-182	2008	check	check	
Hayley Williams	Guitar Hero World Tour	Paramore	2008	check	check	
Zakk Wylde	Guitar Hero World Tour	Ozzy Osbourne, Black Label Society	2008	check	check	
Sting	Guitar Hero World Tour	The Police, Sting	2008	check	check	
James Hetfield	Guitar Hero: Metallica; Tony Hawk's Pro Skater HD	Metallica	2009	check	check	
Lars Ulrich	Guitar Hero: Metallica	Metallica	2009	check	check	
Kirk Hammett	Guitar Hero: Metallica	Metallica	2009	check	check	
Robert Trujillo	Guitar Hero: Metallica	Metallica	2009	check	check	
Lemmy	Guitar Hero: Metallica	Motörhead	2009	check	check	
King Diamond	Guitar Hero: Metallica	Mercyful Fate	2009	check	check	
John Lennon	The Beatles: Rock Band	The Beatles	2009	check	check	
Paul McCartney	The Beatles: Rock Band	The Beatles	2009	check	check	
George Harrison	The Beatles: Rock Band	The Beatles	2009	check	check	
Ringo Starr	The Beatles: Rock Band	The Beatles	2009	check	check	
Johnny Cash	Guitar Hero 5	Johnny Cash	2009	check	check	
Shirley Manson	Guitar Hero 5	Garbage	2009	check	check	
Kurt Cobain	Guitar Hero 5	Nirvana	2009	check	check	
Carlos Santana	Guitar Hero 5	Santana	2009	check	check	
Matt Bellamy	Guitar Hero 5	Muse	2009	check	check	
David Bowie	Lego Rock Band	David Bowie	2009	check	check	
Iggy Pop	Lego Rock Band	The Stooges	2009	check	check	
Freddie Mercury	Lego Rock Band	Queen	2009	check	check	
Brian May	Lego Rock Band	Queen	2009	check	check	
Roger Taylor	Lego Rock Band	Queen	2009	check	check	
John Deacon	Lego Rock Band	Queen	2009	check	check	
Damon Albarn	Lego Rock Band	Blur	2009	check	check	
Graham Coxon	Lego Rock Band	Blur	2009	check	check	
Alex James	Lego Rock Band	Blur	2009	check	check	
Dave Rowntree	Lego Rock Band	Blur	2009	check	check	
David St. Hubbins	Lego Rock Band	Spinal Tap	2009	check	check	
Nigel Tufnel	Lego Rock Band	Spinal Tap	2009	check	check	
Derek Smalls	Lego Rock Band	Spinal Tap	2009	check	check	
Taylor Swift	Band Hero	Taylor Swift	2009	check	check	
Adam Levine	Band Hero	Maroon 5	2009	check	check	
Gwen Stefani	Band Hero	No Doubt	2009	check	check	
Tom Dumont	Band Hero	No Doubt	2009	check	check	
Tony Kanal	Band Hero	No Doubt	2009	check	check	
Adrian Young	Band Hero	No Doubt	2009	check	check	
David Lee Roth	Guitar Hero: Van Halen	Van Halen	2009	check	check	
Eddie Van Halen	Guitar Hero: Van Halen	Van Halen	2009	check	check	
Alex Van Halen	Guitar Hero: Van Halen	Van Halen	2009	check	check	
Wolfgang Van Halen	Guitar Hero: Van Halen	Van Halen	2009	check	check	
Billie Joe Armstrong	Green Day: Rock Band Tony Hawk's American Wasteland	Green Day	2010 2005	check	check	
Mike Dirnt	Green Day: Rock Band	Green Day	2010	check	check	
Tré Cool	Green Day: Rock Band	Green Day	2010	check	check	
Burt Reynolds	Saints Row: The Third	Actor	2011			
George A. Romero	Call of Duty: Black Ops	Film Director	2010	check	check	
Sarah Michelle Gellar	Call of Duty: Black Ops	Actor	2011	check	check	
Robert Englund	Call of Duty: Black Ops	Actor, Director	2011	check	check	
Michael Rooker	Call of Duty: Black Ops	Actor	2011	check	check	
Bear Grylls	Man vs. Wild	Media Personality	2011	check	check	
Jimmy Kimmel	Call of Duty: Black Ops II	Comedian	2012	check		
Katy Perry	The Sims 3: Katy Perry Sweet Treats Final Fantasy Brave Exvius	Singer	2012 2018	check		
Keith David	Saints Row IV	Actor	2013	check		
Kim Kardashian	Kim Kardashian: Hollywood	Media personality, Socialite, Businesswoman	2014			
Khloé Kardashian	Kim Kardashian: Hollywood	Media personality, Socialite, Businesswoman	2014			
Kourtney Kardashian	Kim Kardashian: Hollywood	Media Personality	2014			
Kendall Jenner	Kim Kardashian: Hollywood	Model, TV Personality	2014			
Kris Jenner	Kim Kardashian: Hollywood	Media personality, Socialite, Businesswoman	2014			
Kylie Jenner	Kim Kardashian: Hollywood	Media personality, Socialite, Businesswoman	2014			
Erika Jayne	Kim Kardashian: Hollywood	TV Personality, Singer	2014			
André Leon Talley	Kim Kardashian: Hollywood	Fashion Journalist	2014			
Anna Dello Russo	Kim Kardashian: Hollywood	Fashion Journalist	2014			
Jonathan Cheban	Kim Kardashian: Hollywood	TV Personality	2014			
Karl Lagerfeld	Kim Kardashian: Hollywood	Fashion Designer	2014			
NeNe Leakes	Kim Kardashian: Hollywood	TV Personality, Actor	2014			
Olivier Rousteing	Kim Kardashian: Hollywood	Fashion Designer	2014			
Hideo Kojima	Metal Gear Solid V: The Phantom Pain	Game Developer	2015	check		
Magnus Walker	Need for Speed (2015)	Fashion Designer, Car Collector	2015	check		
Akira Nakai	Need for Speed (2015)	Car Designer	2015	check		
Ken Block	Need for Speed (2015)	Rally Driver	2015	check		
Killer Mike	Gears of War 4	Rapper, Activist	2016	check	check	
Run The Jewels	Gears of War 4	Run the Jewels	2016	check	check	
El-P	Gears of War 4	Rapper	2016	check	check	
Ariana Grande	Final Fantasy Brave Exvius Fortnite Battle Royale	Singer	2017 2021	check	check	
David Hasselhoff	Call of Duty: Infinite Warfare	Actor	2016	check	check	
Jeremy Clarkson	The Grand Tour Game	Automotive Journalist	2019	check		
Richard Hammond	The Grand Tour Game	Automotive Journalist	2019	check		
James May	The Grand Tour Game	Automotive Journalist	2019	check		
Abbie Eaton	The Grand Tour Game	Racing Driver	2019	check		
Danny Trejo	Call of Duty Black Ops 4	Actor	2019	check	check	
Danny Trejo	Far Cry 6	Actor	2021	check		
Marshmello	Fortnite Battle Royale	EDM, DJ	2019	check	check	
Stormzy	Watch Dogs: Legion	Rapper	2020	check	check	
Ninja	Fortnite Battle Royale	Streamer	2020	check	check	
Travis Scott	Fortnite Battle Royale	Rapper	2020	check	check	
Loserfruit	Fortnite Battle Royale	Streamer	2020	check	check	
Lachlan Power	Fortnite Battle Royale	YouTuber	2021	check	check	
Neymar	Fortnite Battle Royale Call of Duty: Warzone	Soccer Player	2021 2022	check	check	
J Balvin	Fortnite Battle Royale	Singer	2021	check	check	
Cassandra Peterson	Call of Duty: Vanguard	Actor	2021	check	check	
Harry Kane	Fortnite Battle Royale	Soccer Player	2021	check	check	
Marco Reus	Fortnite Battle Royale	Soccer Player	2021	check	check	
TheGrefg	Fortnite Battle Royale	YouTuber	2021	check	check	
Bugha	Fortnite Battle Royale	Streamer	2021	check	check	
A$AP Rocky	Need for Speed Unbound	Rapper	2022	check		
MrBeast	Fortnite Battle Royale	YouTuber	2022	check	check	
Bruno Mars	Fortnite Battle Royale	Singer	2022	check	check	
Lionel Messi	Call of Duty: Warzone Fortnite Battle Royale	Soccer Player	2022 2024	check	check	
Anderson .Paak	Fortnite Battle Royale	Singer, Rapper	2022	check	check	
Naomi Osaka	Fortnite Battle Royale	Tennis Player	2022	check	check	
Paul Pogba	Call of Duty: Warzone	Soccer Player	2022	check	check	
Chloe Kim	Fortnite Battle Royale	Snowboarder	2022	check	check	
Ali-A	Fortnite Battle Royale	YouTuber	2022	check	check	
Patrick Mahomes	Fortnite Battle Royale	Football Player	2022	check	check	
Giannis Antetokounmpo	Fortnite Battle Royale	Basketball Player	2022	check	check	
SypherPK	Fortnite Battle Royale	YouTuber	2022	check	check	
Nicolas Cage	Dead by Daylight	Actor	2023	check	check	
Khaby Lame	Fortnite Battle Royale	Influencer	2023	check	check	
The Kid LAROI	Fortnite Battle Royale	Singer, Rapper	2023	check	check	
Lewis Hamilton	Fortnite Battle Royale	Racing Driver	2023	check	check	
Nicki Minaj	Call of Duty: Modern Warfare II Call of Duty: Warzone	Rapper	2023	check	check	
21 Savage	Call of Duty: Modern Warfare II Call of Duty: Warzone	Rapper	2023	check	check	
Shawn Ashmore	Alan Wake 2	Actor	2023	check	check	
The Weeknd	Fortnite Battle Royale	Singer	2023	check	check	
Eminem	Fortnite Battle Royale	Rapper	2023	check	check	
Lady Gaga	Fortnite Battle Royale	Singer	2024	check	check	
Karol G	Fortnite Battle Royale	Singer	2024	check	check	
El Rubius	Fortnite Battle Royale	YouTuber	2024	check	check	
Nick Eh 30	Fortnite Battle Royale	YouTuber	2024	check	check	
Ice Spice	Fortnite Battle Royale	Rapper	2024	check	check	
Juice WRLD	Fortnite Battle Royale	Rapper	2024	check	check	
Mariah Carey	Fortnite Battle Royale	Singer	2024	check	check	
Billie Eilish	Fortnite Battle Royale	Singer	2024	check	check	
Sabrina Carpenter	Fortnite Battle Royale	Singer	2025	check	check	
Shohei Ohtani	Fortnite Battle Royale	Baseball Player	2025	check	check	
Cristiano Ronaldo	Fatal Fury: City of the Wolves	Soccer Player	2025	check	check	
Salvatore Ganacci	Fatal Fury: City of the Wolves	DJ	2025	check	check	
Seth Rogen	Call of Duty: Black Ops 6	Actor	2025	check	check	
