= Athens Skate Park =

Skatepark in Athens, Ohio

Coordinates: 39.3356°N 82.0758°W

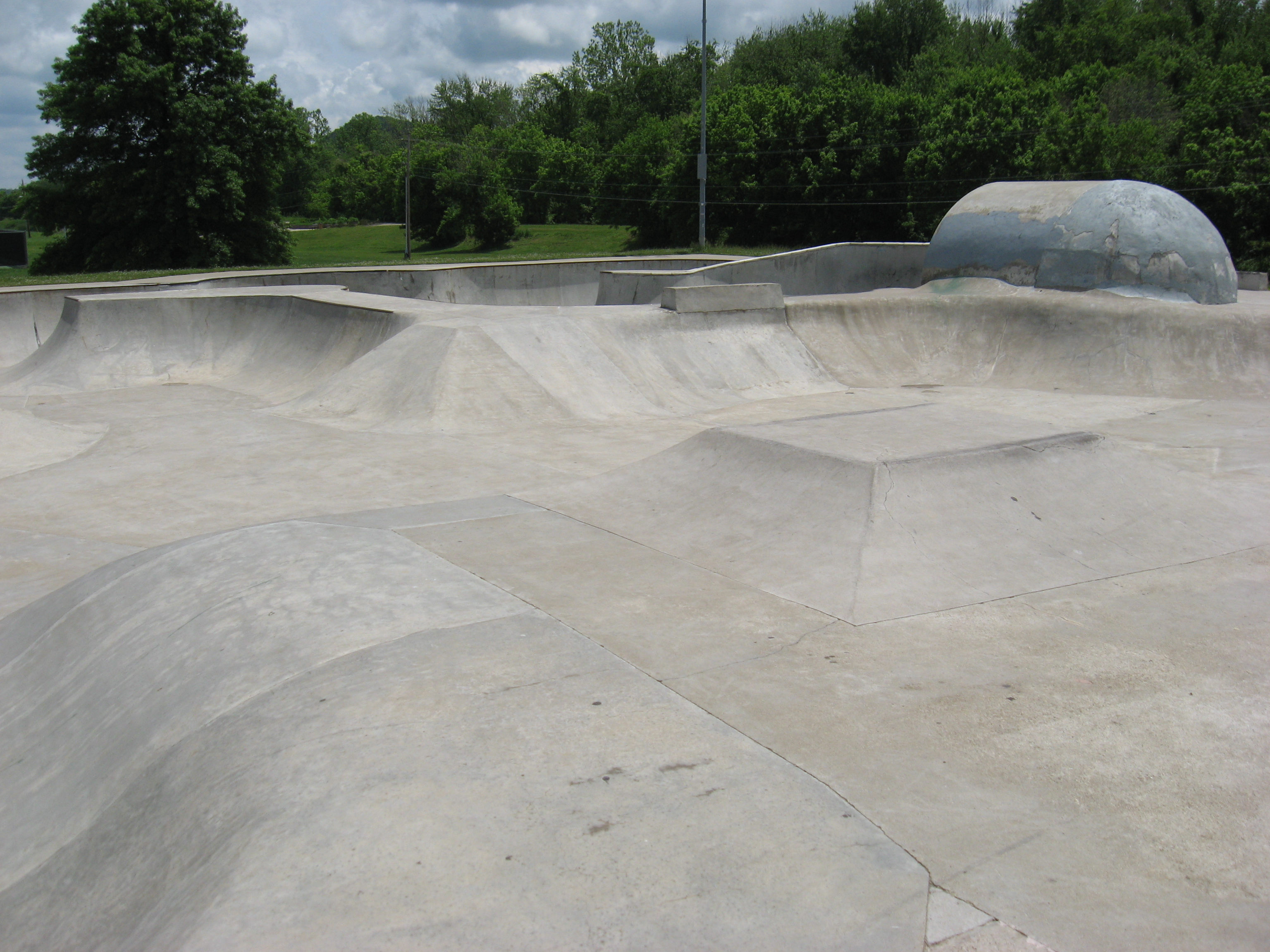
The Athens Skate Park

The Athens Skate Park is, as the name states, a skatepark located in Athens, Ohio, behind the Athens Recreational Center (known simply as "The Rec Center" to locals.) The park was at one time the only skatepark in the world to feature a capsule (a full 16 foot pipe connected to a cradle). The park was built by Grindline Skateparks in 2003 and is the second-largest concrete skatepark in Ohio behind the Kettering street Plaza.

The park features both cement and concrete coping. It has ramps of all sizes and many unique spots. The park is a work in progress. After a set of years, they stopped adding on to the skatepark, leaving how it is to this day. During the summer of 2005 a stage was built and with the insertion of electricity in January 2006 bands can play the stage and events can proceed with ease.

The skatepark is located 40 minutes from the Skatopia in Rutland, Ohio.
