= Tough Guy Competition =

Endurance challenge

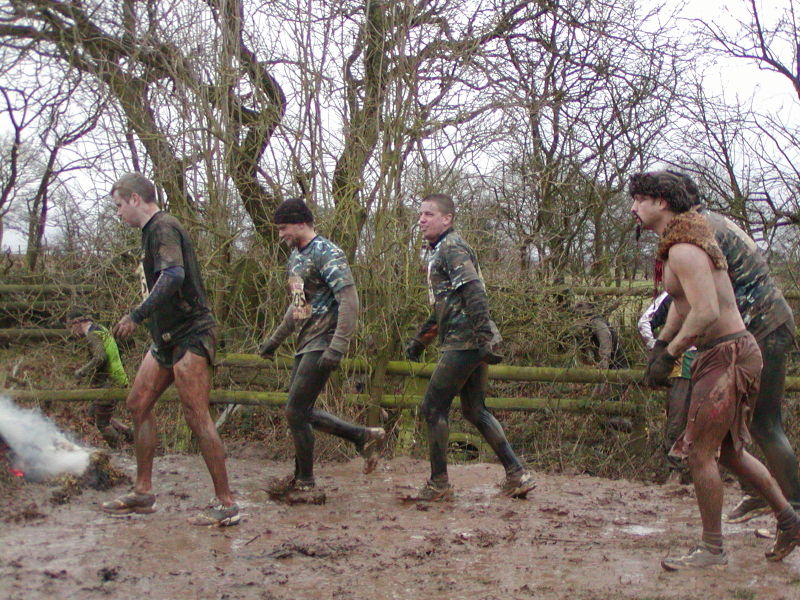
"Tough Guy" competitors running through mud

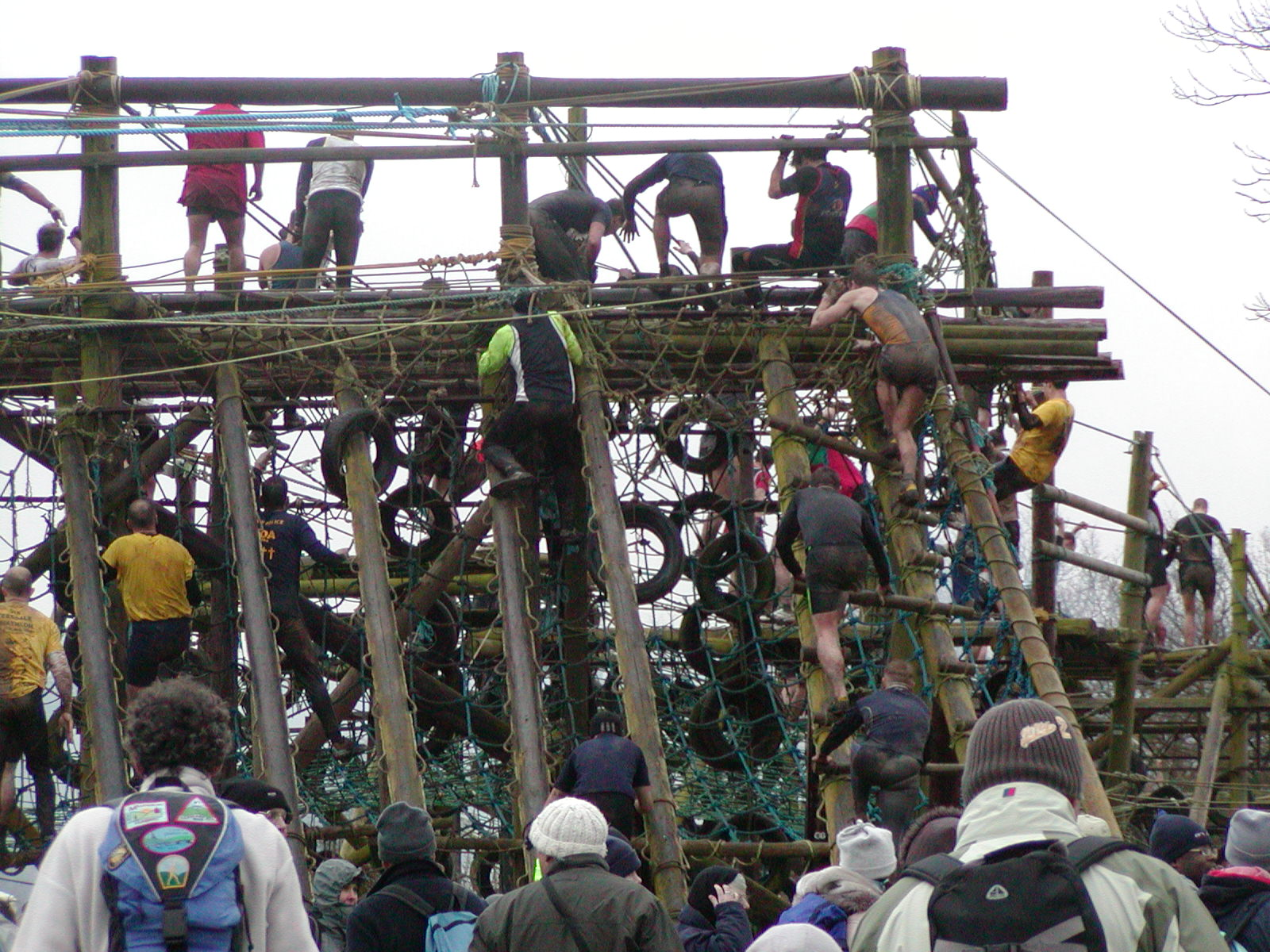
Climbing obstacle

The Tough Guy Competition was an endurance challenge that claims to be the world's most demanding one-day survival ordeal. First staged in 1986 and organised by Billy Wilson under the pseudonym of "Mr. Mouse", it is held on a 600-acre (2.42 square km) farm in the English village of Perton, Staffordshire. It has been described as "the toughest race in the world", with up to one-third of the starters failing to finish in a typical year. After 27 stagings of the winter event, Wilson still claimed nobody had ever finished the course according to his extremely demanding rules.

The race, and its summer equivalent, has suffered two fatalities during its history. Taking place at the end of January, often in freezing winter conditions, the Tough Guy race is staged over a course of over 9 miles (2016 about 15 kilometres). It consists of a cross-country run including many (2016 was nine) 50-metre slalom runs up and down a hill, over 6 feet deep mud and water filled ditches (resembling the Battle of the Somme), log jumps, followed by an assault course. Claimed to be tougher than any other publicly accessible worldwide, featuring over 25 obstacles through, under and over freezing water pools, over fire pits, rope bridges, nets and so on (see detail below). The organizers claim that running the course involves risking barbed wire, cuts, scrapes, burns, dehydration, hypothermia, acrophobia, claustrophobia, electric shocks, sprains, twists, joint dislocation and broken bones.

Although the course is adjusted each year, its features have included a 40-foot (12.2 metres) crawl through flooded tunnels, balancing planks across a fire pit, and a wade through chest-deep muddy water. There are many high timber towers to climb with the Brandenburg gate at 50 feet being the highest. Marshals, dressed as warriors, fire amphibious tank gun blanks and let off exploding flares and smoke bombs over the heads of competitors as they crawl under a 70-metre section of barbed wire. Until 2000, some runners took part in the event carrying heavy wooden crucifixes.

Entry fees start at £75 and increase on fixed dates as one gets nearer to the event, so the later one signs up for the event, the more one pays. Entrants have to be 16 or older. The event regularly attracts fields of up to 5,000 competitors, many from the United States, France, Germany and various countries around the world. Before taking part, entrants must sign a "death warrant", which acknowledges the many risks and dangers, and which the organizers claim absolves them of any legal liability in the case of injury. First aid is provided by doctors, paramedics, nurses, and 60 first aiders from St. John Ambulance.

After a year's hiatus following the 2017 race, with three events held during this period on the traditional Tough Guy course under the "Mr Mouse Events" name (albeit with altered routes and distances), the winter "Mudathon" in February 2018 was filmed and later broadcast on BBC Two as part of the corporation's Sports Relief scheduling; it followed four celebrities on their journey to train and attempt to complete the "Tough Guy" course. Tough Guy HQ later announced it would be returning to its roots and has since restarted its Nettle Warrior and Tough Guy Original races under the original format and names, which it continues to hold annually.

== Deaths and injuries ==
In 2000, one competitor, Michael Green, from Leicestershire, collapsed midway through the race and later died in hospital, reportedly of a massive heart attack brought on by extreme hypothermia. Green was 44 years old. According to Wilson, this was the first fatality in 15 years.

Other injuries suffered in the event are common. Local newspaper reports suggested that among the competitors in the 2009 event, one suffered a broken neck, another broken pelvis, yet another broken pubic bone while there were a dozen broken or dislocated bones and 600 runners - including the winner - suffered hypothermia.

== Nettle Warrior ==
Nettle Warrior is the summer version of Tough Guy, first staged in 1998, and is normally run at the end of July. Though the course is essentially the same as Tough Guy, there are notable differences. Nettle Warrior involves two laps of an area the organizers have called "The Killing Fields", a log carry and some rafting as part of "The Lake" obstacle.

== Billy Wilson ==
Before he began staging the Tough Guy, Billy Wilson was already known as a high-profile organizer of road running races and a sometimes eccentric participant, most notably for taking part in the first London Marathon in 1981 dressed as a pantomime horse to raise funds for his Tettenhall Horse Sanctuary, which is the principal beneficiary of the Tough Guy event. A former Grenadier Guards trained soldier in the British Army, Wilson's earliest sporting exploits were as a cyclist, a career that was curtailed after an accident on the Aldersley track. Wilson was among the pioneers of the running boom in Britain in the 1980s, helping to found the Wolverhampton Road Runners club, of which he became chairman, and from 1982 to 1987 he organized the annual Wolverhampton Marathon and half-marathon. Road-related leg injuries and increasing traffic saw Wilson shift his focus to his off-road events, staged on his own land, which have been extremely successful, raising £170,000 at a typical event.

== The course ==
=== Tough Guy / Nettle Warrior ===
The race consists of a cross country run, followed by an obstacle course, also referred to as the "Killing Fields".

Obstacle	Description	Killing Field
Country Miles	A 6-mile cross country run.	
Slalom	An up and down slalom, consisting of running up a hill and back down.	
Ghurkha Grand National	A series of fences, ditches and jumps with cargo net to scramble under.	
The Tiger (followed by Sting in the Tail)	A 40 ft A-frame, crossing through hanging electrified cables and another 40 ft A-frame.	K1
Scaffold Bridge	This is traditionally the location of a water break.	K2
Colditz Walls	Three progressively higher walls - 2, 3 & 4m high.	K3
Behemoth	Four 30 ft tall platforms with ropes stretching between them.	K4
Battle of the Somme	Fire Barbed Wire Below Water Brimstone Terror	K5
Fiery Holes	A series of muddy water ditches, followed by burning bales of hay.	K6
Tyre Crawl	Tunnels created from tyres.	K7
Swamp	Knee deep mud crossing with a vacuum that will suck in the strongest of men.	K8
Vietcong Torture Chamber Tunnels	Tunnels created from like Vietcong Saigon Horror.	K9
Sky Walk & Paradise Climb	A 14-metre-high (46 ft) cargo net which leads out to ropes draped across a pond.	K10
Splosh Pool	A recreation of walking the plank.	K11
Underwater Tunnel	Three poles to duck under, leading up to the underwater tunnel.	K12
Brandenburger Gate	40 ft vertical wall climb.	K13
Deux Chevaux Island		K14
Death Plunge	Planks of wood extending out over a lake.	K15
Jesus Bridge	A bridge of barrels and planks of wood.	K16
Dans Deceiver	A vertical cargo net, followed by a declined cargo net.	K17
Dragon Pools	Series of ropes stretched across the pool.	K18
Gladiatough Colloseum	Lake planked 500 metres figure of 8 intertwined, interlaced Spartacus Jousting..	K19
Stalag Escape	20 ft crawl through mud, under barbed wire.	K20
Tyre Torture	A path of randomly laid tyres to stumble across.	K21
Pedestrian Bridge		K22
The Anaconda	A series of large concrete pipes with hanging Electric Wires	K23
Viagra Falls	A steep muddy hill slide beneath hanging electric eels.	K25
Torture Chamber	Dark tunnel, partially flooded and filled with hanging batons and electric cables.	

=== Last Man Standing ===
There is a smaller course for participants of that day's event. It consists of;

- 15-metre underwater swim
- Scottish Thistle Hill roll
- Lassoed Legs Lake Lope
- Highwire Brandenburg Bootlace Struggle
- Highwire TG bootlace Blaney Kiss
- Bite electric wire

=== Media ===
In January 2010 CBBC aired the series "My life". On the first episode "Tough Kids" boys aged 11–12 take part in the assault course. Three of the boys are especially determined to tackle the course and they tell their individual story. The film was first aired on BBC1 on 20 February 2010 as part of the "My Life" series and was produced by Indus Films, in conjunction with Film Tank

On 13 October 2010 Bam's World Domination showcased Bam Margera, Ryan Dunn, and skateboarder Tim O’Connor doing the Competition.

During the hiatus of 2017–2018, the Mr Mouse Events "Mudathon" was filmed and broadcast on BBC Two as part of the corporation's Sports Relief scheduling. Four celebrities - Les Dennis, Tameka Empson, Susannah Constantine and Miles Jupp - were followed across a ten-week period in which they attempted to train themselves "back to fitness", culminating in an attempt to complete the "Tough Guy" obstacle course in February 2018.

== Sources and references ==
- Episode of Beste Belg ('Best Belgian') program on VTM (Flemish commercial TV), 2005, entering presenter Staff Coppens's brother Matthias
- An article from Jim Caple of ESPN, recounting his attempt at Tough Guy 2007 - http://www.espn.com/espn/eticket/story?page=toughguy2007&redirected=true
- 2010 Results can be found at https://web.archive.org/web/20100208170429/http://www.tdl.ltd.uk/

== See also ==
- Tough Mudder
- Ninja Warrior
