= Viva La Bam =

American reality television series

- Title card from seasons 2–5
- Genre: Reality; Comedy; Physical comedy; Slapstick; Pranks
- Created by: Bam Margera; Troy Miller
- Starring: Bam Margera; Phil Margera; April Margera; Don Vito; Ryan Dunn; Raab Himself; Brandon DiCamillo; Rake Yohn
- Opening theme: "The King of Rock 'n Roll" by Daniel Lioneye
- Country of origin: United States
- Original language: English
- No. of seasons: 5
- No. of episodes: 40

Production
- Executive producers: Bam Margera; Troy Miller; Tracey Baird
- Producers: Todd "Spider" Chambers; Tim Glomb; Pete DeLasho
- Production location: Pennsylvania
- Cinematography: Joe Frantz
- Editors: Narumi Inatsugu; John M. Valerio; Roger Hinze; Rick Kent; Sean McGinty
- Running time: 19–21 minutes
- Production companies: 18 Husky (seasons 1–2); Dakota Pictures (seasons 3–5); Bam Margera Productions

Original release
- Network: MTV
- Release: October 26, 2003 – August 14, 2005

Related
- CKY; Jackass; Homewrecker; Bam's Unholy Union; Bam's World Domination; Bam's Bad Ass Game Show

Viva La Bam is an American reality television series that stars skateboarder Bam Margera and his family. It ran on MTV for five seasons from 2003 to 2005. The show is set around Castle Bam, Margera's home in Pocopson Township, Pennsylvania, and his parents' house.

His friends (the CKY crew) and most of the main cast of Jackass also appear in the series. Each episode has a specific theme, mission, or challenge which is accomplished by performing pranks, skateboarding, and enlisting the help of friends, relatives, and/or experts. Although partly improvised, the show was supported by a greater degree of planning and organization.

== History ==
=== Production ===
The cast includes Bam Margera, Ryan Dunn, Brandon DiCamillo, Raab Himself, and Rake Yohn. The show also stars Bam's parents, Phil and April, and his uncle, Don Vito. Tim Glomb and Brandon Novak join the main cast in later episodes. The show was mostly filmed in and around West Chester, Pennsylvania, and also visited Las Vegas, Atlantic City, New Orleans, Los Angeles, Minneapolis, Mexico, Brazil, and Finland. The episode "Iceland", originally shot for the second season, became known as the "lost episode" of the series, and can be found on Viva La Bands, a two-disc compilation album featuring several bands from the series.

The show debuted on October 26, 2003, and concluded on August 14, 2005, on the MTV network in the United States. It was later in syndication around the world. Tony Hawk starred in the pilot and Mardi Gras episodes. Each of the five seasons consisted of eight half-hour episodes, comprising 40 episodes in total. In December 2005, Bam Margera addressed rumors of a sixth season on Last Call with Carson Daly. His comment was that there would be no sixth season, but there would be occasional MTV specials and he and Johnny Knoxville were planning things for possible Jackass stunts. On March 22, 2006, a 2 episode special of Viva La Bam, titled "Viva La Spring Break" aired. It features Bam and his friends, his parents, April and Phil, and his uncle, Don Vito, traveling from West Chester to Fort Lauderdale, Florida, together to cause mayhem at a beach party, doing stunts, and pulling pranks along the way.

=== Featured music and guests ===
The show features music from some of Margera's favorite bands, such as HIM, CKY, Bloodhound Gang, Cradle of Filth, Clutch, Turbonegro, Dimmu Borgir, Carnal Forge, Slayer, Gwar, Children of Bodom, The Bled, The 69 Eyes, and Free Beer. Many of Margera's friends also appear on the show, including Johnny Knoxville, The Dudesons, and fellow skateboarders Tony Hawk, Terry Kennedy, Jason Ellis, Bob Burnquist, Geoff Rowley, Mike Vallely, and Kevin Staab. Actor Sean Penn and his son Hopper appear in the episode "Fort Knoxville", and rock musician Billy Idol appears on the "special" birthday episode "Ape's Surprise". The episode "Driveway Skatepark" includes appearances by Tommy Lee, Dave Grohl, Holly Madison, Pharrell Williams, Don "Magic" Juan and Charlie O'Connell.

== Episodes ==
| Season | Episodes | Originally released | |
| Season | Episodes | First released | Last released |
|---|---|---|---|
| 1 | 8 | October 26, 2003 | December 14, 2003 |
| 2 | 8 | April 25, 2004 | June 13, 2004 |
| 3 | 8 | October 24, 2004 | December 12, 2004 |
| 4 | 8 | March 6, 2005 | April 24, 2005 |
| 5 | 8 | June 26, 2005 | August 14, 2005 |

=== Season 1 (2003) ===
| No. overall | No. in season | Title | Original release date |
|---|---|---|---|
| 1 | 1 | "Phil's Hell Day/Bam's Skatepark" | October 26, 2003 |
Bam tries to make Phil's day a living hell by installing a fire pole in the living room, ironing decals of hamburgers on all of Phil's clothes, replacing the toothpaste with ground meat and demolishing Phil's van. Next, Bam gets his parents out of the house by sending them to Atlantic City. As soon as Phil & April hit the road, Bam and the crew get to work converting the family home into an indoor/outdoor skate park, and invite some professional skaters over, including Tony Hawk and Bucky Lasek.
| 2 | 2 | "Don't Feed Phil" | November 2, 2003 |
Bam wants to see if Phil, who is obese, can go without food for twenty four hours. Bam tells his family and friends "Don't Feed Phil," puts up flyers and billboards saying the same around town, and has everyone take turns watching him. When it comes to Don Vito's shift, he almost ruins Phil's fast by ordering pizza from out of town. Catching this, April calls to warn Bam (who is at a Turbonegro concert) about Don Vito's actions and he decides to move the concert to his house, in the living room. Confronting Don Vito, Hank from Hell puts make up on his face as punishment for his actions. Once Phil makes it to the full twenty four hours, Bam and the crew feed him random concoctions of food. Don Vito also wins a bet by drinking an entire bottle of hot sauce. At the end of the episode, Bam pulls a fungus-infested toenail from Don Vito's foot with needle-nose pliers.
| 3 | 3 | "Family Reunion" | November 9, 2003 |
At the beginning of the episode, Rake Yohn is tricked into hitting a beehive full of bees instead of a piñata. Later, Bam decides to host a family reunion with a medieval theme. Bam and friends build a drawbridge and a moat to replace the front door and erect a walled area in the form of a castle in the front yard. Dressed in medieval armor, Bam & Co., including Compton Ass Terry riding atop an elephant, host a feast. When Don Vito's antics take their toll, Bam's grandmother, Lady Mum Mum, leaves the party claiming "this whole family is crazy!" At the end of the episode, the Margeras get a violation notice from the township for having the elephant at the family reunion, as well as a "thank you" letter from the neighbors for letting their kids play with the elephant. Bam is then inspired to get more violation notices from the township.
| 4 | 4 | "Viva Las Vegas" | November 16, 2003 |
Bam and his friends decide to take Phil and April to Las Vegas to celebrate Phil and April's wedding anniversary after they order a Russian mail-order bride for Raab Himself to marry. When they arrive in Vegas, Don Vito loses all his money from gambling too much and gets thrown out of a casino, gets a Heartagram tattoo, has his hair dyed blue by Bam, and is given a fake soul patch made from Bam's pubic hair. After Phil is dressed up to look like Elvis, he and April get remarried next to Raab and his Russian bride. At the party in their hotel room, April provokes a food fight with wedding cake after stuffing it into Don Vito's face as revenge for eating all of her wedding cake many years ago.
| 5 | 5 | "Paint Phil Blue & Other Stories" | November 23, 2003 |
April & Phil go on a three-day-weekend leaving Bam at home. While they're away, Bam and his friends paint the kitchen and everything in it blue. Next, they build a secret tunnel into Don Vito's house. Then, the boys steal April's car and convert it into a hot rod. While Bam and the crew are working on April's car, Ville Valo (lead singer of the band HIM) makes a 30 second cameo. Lastly, Bam and his crew put Don Vito and Phil into a big plastic box and shoot random items into it by using a machine, including honey, bacon, Corn Flakes, anchovies, money, worms, roaches and maggots. Don Vito and Phil destroy the box and Don Vito gets away with $100 in his truck with Bam and Ryan pursuing.
| 6 | 6 | "Very Merry Margera Christmas" | November 30, 2003 |
Bam decides to decorate the Margera house with ultra-bright lights, man-made snow, giant-sized Christmas ornaments, and an indoor ice skating rink. Bam also gets a choir to sing Christmas songs for them while they play in the fake snow. In the end of the episode, he and Ryan Dunn decide to prank Brandon DiCamillo by filling his shoes with thumbtacks and wake him up by vacuuming his mouth ("Rule #1: never fall asleep at my house," says Bam).
| 7 | 7 | "April's Revenge" | December 7, 2003 |
Bam says he plans to take April, Phil, Don Vito and his friends out for a boating trip on the Susquehanna River in Pennsylvania, but actually plans to leave April, Phil and Don Vito on Kohr island, about 250 metres (820 ft) away from Three Mile Island nuclear power plant. Once arriving, April becomes suspicious and decides to turn the tables on her son by leaving Bam and his friends on the island. They take up the challenge of staying on the island overnight, however, it starts raining and Bam ends up catching a cold in the morning. They also build a makeshift ramp out of wood and duct tape, have Tim Glomb go skating naked, build a fort using wood to try to keep the rain out, fart during a game of poker with Don Vito (who came back to check on them), use a fire extinguisher in Raab's face, burn a cake by accident, and eventually they escape from the island. The episode ends with a news reporter visiting April and telling her that her house has been blown up. April finds out that the house is still standing and forgives Bam, and Bam forgives April.
| 8 | 8 | "Scavenger Hunt" | December 14, 2003 |
After being told by April that he could do whatever he wanted with an old piano in their living room, Bam, his friends, and the Bloodhound Gang embark on a scavenger hunt; whichever team wins gets the piano. The hunt begins with Bam purchasing three banged-up used cars. Next, he splits everyone up into three teams (Gnarkill, Policia, and Lady Boy) with the Bloodhound Gang forming the fourth team. The teams jump into their cars and race around town collecting bizarre items, as well as performing grotesque tasks needed to win the scavenger hunt. Bam and Team Gnarkill win, and decide to drop the piano from a crane down onto their already wrecked car. At the end of the episode, it is revealed that Bam and his crew have been kicked out of the township for all they've done this season.

=== Season 2 (2004) ===
| No. overall | No. in season | Title | Original release date |
|---|---|---|---|
| 9 | 1 | "Castle Bam" | April 25, 2004 |
Bam and the crew search for a new home and stumble upon a secluded house with acres of yard, complete with a unicorn mural painted on the side. Bam and the boys decide to abandon their unpacking duties and head to Amsterdam for a CKY show, leaving April and Phil to unpack and decorate the new house. Bam returns from Amsterdam and hates what April has done with the house. Bam proclaims, "New house, new rules!"
| 10 | 2 | "Dating Don Vito" | May 2, 2004 |
When Bam learns that the legendary metal band Slayer are coming for a visit, the boys feel the need to do some redecorating and modifications to the house. Home improvements include installing an indoor mini-half pipe, a pirate-themed bar, and a full-scale concert stage in the yard. Bam then invites the whole town to a backyard concert/bash. As the evening approaches, Bam decides that Don Vito needs to bring a date and they try to find him one.
| 11 | 3 | "Fat Boy Face Off" | May 9, 2004 |
Bam enters Phil and Don Vito in a competition he calls "The Fat Boy Face Off." The contest includes hoagie racing, spinning in circles until dizzy, and an obstacle course called the "Slobstacle Course." To their surprise, there is no prize, only destruction to their own personal property - and in the end the only winner is, of course, Bam.
| 12 | 4 | "Mardi Gras, Pt. 1" | May 16, 2004 |
Bam (with a group of skateboarding legends including Tony Hawk, Jason Ellis, Tim O'Connor, and Donny Barley) head to Mardi Gras in two RV's. Meanwhile, Ryan Dunn is left with a mini-motorcycle to get to Mardi Gras because he refused to wake up in time. On the way down the RV's declare war and Bam sessions out-of-the-way skate spots. At the end of the episode, when they were in Tennessee, they decide to go to Skatopia, which is in Ohio, causing a 16-hour delay all the way to Mardi Gras in New Orleans, much to the anger of Vito, who yells at Tony Hawk; "No more skateboarding!"
| 13 | 5 | "Mardi Gras, Pt. 2" | May 23, 2004 |
Bam and the crew leave Skatopia in one piece and continue their trek towards Mardi Gras. Don Vito continues to get annoyed at Tony Hawk for delaying their travel with his constant skate sessions. Fed up with Vito's constant complaining, Bam and the others buy him a jar of dude eggs for him to eat. Eventually, the crew arrives in New Orleans, only to find that Dunn got there first after getting a ride on an airplane in South Carolina when he had to ditch the moped. When they get home, Bam and Raab decides to pull a prank on Rake by pouring a bucket of crabs on Rake's bed and on Rake himself.
| 14 | 6 | "Community Disservice" | May 30, 2004 |
Bam challenges April to do five things that will benefit the community. From Bam's list, April chooses reading stories to the elderly, giving Bam's clothes to kids, giving Phil a haircut, and, with the help of Don Vito and Phil, picking up trash from public spaces. On the other hand, Bam opts to build a crude concrete half-pipe for the kids in front of a hardware store, flips Don Vito's car over so Phil can have a parking spot, uproots trees by running them over with his ATV and replants them at the retirement home, and dumps the trash that April, Phil, and Don Vito collected into Vito's house, causing Vito to go crazy.
| 15 | 7 | "Tree Top Casino" | June 6, 2004 |
It's Arbor Day, so Bam decides to knock down one of the tall trees in the backyard. April hears the noise from the house and comes outside to yell at Bam. He gets the idea to build a casino. Then Bam hangs Vito's Honda Civic in the trees to test the durability of them for the casino. Vito comes out to see his car in the trees and freaks out. Then the casino gets built, and Bam calls it Fast Eddie's Tree-Top Casino. During the Grand Opening, Bam hires professional wrestlers to fight in a ring below the casino. In the end, it becomes a Battle Royale that includes Phil, Don Vito, the wrestlers, and Bam.
| 16 | 8 | "Demo Derby" | June 13, 2004 |
Bam takes Don Vito to a used car dealer to buy him a new car. After seeing the cheap prices of the used cars, Bam decides to purchase four cars and bring them back to his 14-acre (57,000 m2) lot. He then has a Demolition Derby; the winner of which would receive a military truck that Glomb found while he was selling the parts of Vito's old car that the guys destroyed at the beginning of the episode. Bam and the crew smash and crash into each other until there is nothing left of their automobiles, and in a very contrary-to-normal ending, Don Vito gets the prize due to Glomb driving into the out of bounds zone.

=== Season 3 (2004) ===
| No. overall | No. in season | Title | Original release date |
|---|---|---|---|
| 17 | 1 | "Driveway Skatepark" | October 24, 2004 |
Bam decides to turn his driveway into a skatepark. While Tim Glomb constructs it, Bam, his family, and the CKY crew travel to Los Angeles to collect celebrity souvenirs from Dave Grohl, N.E.R.D, and others to pave into the driveway skatepark, during which they pour cement on Don Vito's car. Don Vito tries to get into the Playboy Mansion, but they won't let him in. So Bam drives over there, says the password and they get in, but not before duct taping Vito to a wheelchair to prevent any sexual behavior. However, it only proves to be a temporary fix when Vito touches Holly Madison's bunny tail after tricking her into giving him a hug. As a result, he gets ostracized from the group and banned any access to the Playboy Mansion. Coming back to West Chester, Vito is frustrated further when he finds out that Bam ruined another one of his cars. Grateful for April and Phil for securing the golf balls that Adam Sandler used in his film, Happy Gilmore, they are displayed in the highest honor of Bam's driveway skatepark.
| 18 | 2 | "Uncivil War" | October 31, 2004 |
After Bam discovers a Civil War cannonball on his property, he and the CKY crew decide to hold a Civil War reenactment in his backyard, complete with Union and Rebel soldiers. Bam decides to cut the power down and he said that they're living in the "Olden Days" just like in 1860. They also cannot use cars, they have to travel by using horse carriages. Having enough of Bam's tomfoolery, Vito steals the cannonball and hightails it to his favorite bar. However, the CKY crew show up and take the ball back from Vito. When the cannon ball is used, "Fast Eddie's" Tree Top Casino is destroyed.
| 19 | 3 | "Fort Knoxville" | November 7, 2004 |
Bam gets paid a visit by his old friend Johnny Knoxville. When he discovers that Johnny's given his Hummer a "makeover" by damaging it (reminiscent of Knoxville's role in the film Walking Tall), this friendly visit turns into an all-out prank war. Eventually, the prank war ended up as a draw. Sean Penn and his son, Hopper, guest star.
| 20 | 4 | "Rockstars" | November 14, 2004 |
After an argument with Bam over him playing loud music while Phil is trying to do taxes, Vito proclaims that anyone can become a rock star. Bam challenges both Vito and Phil to go through training to become full-fledged rock stars. Vito gets a tattoo of Bruce Springsteen's name on his rear end, earning him the wrath of Mum-Mum(his mother and Bam's grandmother). In an angry tirade, she orders both Bam and Vito to leave at once.
| 21 | 5 | "Mutiny on the Bam" | November 21, 2004 |
Bam and the CKY crew's tomfoolery finally makes April angry. As a peace offering, Bam takes her, his family, and the entire crew on a cruise on a pirate ship with Vito as captain. When Vito fails in his duties as captain after Phil falls overboard and he steers the ship the wrong way, Bam and the crew declare mutiny and spray him with a fire hose until Bam is declared the new captain. They find a small, deserted island and build a Tiki Bar stand on it, afterwards destroying it with the ship's cannons. The cannon fire provokes an appearance by the Coast Guard in a Blackhawk helicopter.
| 22 | 6 | "Angry Ape" | November 28, 2004 |
Bam challenges Ape to not complain for 24 hours. He and the CKY crew spend the entire day torturing her, making the 24 hours as difficult as possible. But if April can successfully go a whole 24 hours without complaining, Bam will give her anything she wants. Eventually, she manages to complete the bet and gets a nice dinner with Bam in a suit, which ends up in a food fight.
| 23 | 7 | "Mall of Bam" | December 5, 2004 |
Bam takes his family and the CKY crew to the Mall of America for a skating demo. While there, he decides that everyone will spend the entire night inside the mall, with everyone given $100 each to spend.
| 24 | 8 | "Bamiature Golf" | December 12, 2004 |
After trashing another one of Vito's cars, Bam promises him that he'll never destroy Vito's cars again if Vito beats him on the miniature golf course he builds in the backyard. Also, Ryan Dunn and Bam duct tape a port-a-loo shut with Raab inside as revenge for leaving them stuck on a Cherry Picker for four and a half hours. Eventually, Vito wins.

=== Season 4 (2005) ===
| No. overall | No. in season | Title | Original release date |
|---|---|---|---|
| 25 | 1 | "Viva la Europe, Pt. 1" | March 6, 2005 |
When Phil and April go on a trip to France to celebrate their anniversary, Bam and the crew also decide to head to Europe to throw them an anniversary dinner in Venice with various food items collected from their trip. When Ryan Dunn gets Vito's luggage lost in Saudi Arabia, Vito is forced by Bam to wear iconic European outfits based on where they go. Traveling in HIM's tour bus, they attend Oktoberfest in Munich, Germany, where Bam and Ryan leave to go to Dracula's Castle (Bran Castle) in Romania to collect wine for April. They take a wrong turn and end up getting lost in the Alps after nearly nine hours of driving.
| 26 | 2 | "Viva la Europe, Pt. 2" | March 13, 2005 |
This episode is the continuation of the previous episode. After finally arriving in Romania to get wine, Bam and Ryan rendezvous with the others in Switzerland. They make their way to Venice in Italy, where Bam and his friends prepare the anniversary dinner. Vito ruins the dinner by mishandling the spaghetti and resulting in a food fight, humiliating April. Later, Bam gets April and Phil another chance at an anniversary dinner in Monaco. To be sure that Vito won't ruin this dinner, Raab and Dunn handcuff Vito out on a pier by the sea and moving the beer away.
| 27 | 3 | "CKY Get Jobs" | March 20, 2005 |
On this episode, Bam and his friends (including Don Vito) get jobs so they can pay a $582.00 heating bill or clean like April. Brandon gets a ticket for parking in a wrong spot with a rickshaw, causing them to lose.
| 28 | 4 | "State of Bam" | March 27, 2005 |
On this episode, Bam gets the idea to sail on water with a car. However when the township denies his request to do it due to previous violations and complaints incurred against him by the neighbors, Bam decides to make his own little state. There's much cursing, playing tricks on each other, blowing up stuff, and Vito.
| 29 | 5 | "Bam on the Bayou" | April 3, 2005 |
Bam builds a bayou in front of Don Vito's trailer. Vito falls in and gets into one of his usual angry fits. In doing so, he claims that bayous only exist in Louisiana, so Bam decides to go to a bayou in Texas (Texiana). Phil decides to stay home because he figures that it would be more fun than going to Texas, so it becomes a competition between Phil and Bam to see who can have the most fun. Though Bam leads early on in the competition, Phil has the most fun staying home and wins the bet. This forces Bam to honor his end of the bargain: dinner and a hug, but not before getting his revenge on Vito for making him lose the bet by heading back to West Chester early.
| 30 | 6 | "Groundhog Day" | April 3, 2005 |
Bam and the crew go to Groundhog Day in Pennsylvania to find out that there will be six more weeks of winter. In light of this, they decide to make a snow-race. However, after wrecking April's beloved PT Cruiser by completely filling it up with snow, she gets revenge on Bam by driving away with his Lamborghini.
| 31 | 7 | "Mexico" | April 17, 2005 |
Bam, his family, and friends go to Mexico. Vito demands that Bam takes him too, but he refuses knowing that Vito would likely ruin the Mexico trip by ending up in jail. If Vito learns ten Spanish sentences when they all come back, Vito gets to keep Bam's Hummer. If he fails, then Vito will have to be Bam's pet Mexican. Dico stays at home to teach Vito some Spanish and does all he can to sabotage him. Jukka and Jarppi from The Dudesons appear in this episode.
| 32 | 8 | "CKY Challenge" | April 24, 2005 |
Bam and the guys are bored, so they make a game which gives random activities for his family and friends, with the winner receiving possession of the State of Bam.

=== Season 5 (2005) ===
| No. overall | No. in season | Title | Original release date |
|---|---|---|---|
| 33 | 1 | "Viva la Brazil" | June 26, 2005 |
Bam takes Don Vito to Brazil, which Vito thinks is in the Bahamas, and they meet up with pro-skater Bob Burnquist, who takes them for a session in a skatepark owned by local band Charlie Brown Jr. frontman Chorão, a friend of Burnquist's. Meanwhile, Dico turns April and Phil's house into a more "rainforest-y" environment.
| 34 | 2 | "Ape's Surprise" | July 3, 2005 |
Bam celebrates each decade of April's life for her birthday, and gets a sunroof on his Lamborghini courtesy of Billy Idol. To ensure Vito doesn't ruin April's birthday, Bam sends him decked out in a clown costume and to his usual beer place.
| 35 | 3 | "Vito's Revenge" | July 10, 2005 |
Don Vito seeks revenge after all of Bam's and CKY Crew pranks with the help of Mike Vallely. However when Ryan discovers where they're hiding, Bam and the CKY crew get their revenge on Vallely and Vito. Eventually, Mike decides to concede and never challenge Bam again. On the other hand, Don Vito continues cursing at the CKY crew for ruining his revenge. Bam reminds him that war means war and if he challenges him again, it'll be worse for Vito.
| 36 | 4 | "Metal Mulisha" | July 17, 2005 |
Vito attempts to join Metal Mulisha but has to pay dues before he is accepted. In the meantime, Phil and April are stuck with the task of looking after Gwar.
| 37 | 5 | "Limo vs. Lambo" | July 24, 2005 |
Bam and Ryan decide to have a drag race: Bam's Lamborghini Gallardo against Ryan's souped-up Limo (Lincoln Town Car), but before the race can happen, the Lamborghini disappears from the garage. So they decide to get a lie detector test to figure it out. Eventually, Novak, Raab, and especially Dunn (who Bam suspected to take the Lamborghini just to sabotage him) passed the lie detector test. The next day, Jimmy Pop and Evil Jared from the Bloodhound Gang wakes Bam up and tells him that they took the Lamborghini the whole time just to get a dent fixed that occurred when Bam raced Ryan to the garage and then, he threw a brick at his Lamborghini causing the dent. Eventually, Bam wins the drag race and tries to force Dunn to uphold their bet by making out with Raab.
| 38 | 6 | "Where's Vito?" | July 31, 2005 |
After Bam wrecks Vito's bedroom window with the help of Dani Filth, Vito decides he's had enough with Bam breaking his property and seeks revenge. He runs away to New York City with one of Bam's treasured possessions, his Hummer H2, and with him is Bam's friend Ryan Dunn. It's also revealed that April, Phil and Rake are secretly helping Vito and Dunn get revenge on Bam. At the end, Vito destroys Bam's Hummer and demands Bam to fix his bedroom window. Bam gets revenge on him by installing a garage door in place of his bedroom window. Afterwards, Vito decides he has enough of Bam's nonsense and leaves.
| 39 | 7 | "Bam on the River" | August 7, 2005 |
Bam and his crew decide to go to the Delaware Rehoboth Lagoon with Vito. However, they have to travel down the river to get there. Bam places a bet with Vito that if they don't make it down there by two days, Vito can have Bam's pool for the summer. Vito leaves them and makes it before Bam and his friends do, but not before he burns his feet while walking in the street, his arrogance leading to April and Phil to pick him up. As revenge for his abandonment, Bam and Glomb tie an anchor around Vito and moves the party at his house.
| 40 | 8 | "Finlandia" | August 14, 2005 |
At the beginning of this episode, Bam finds a picture of Raab's wife (the Russian mail order bride) in Raab's wallet. Bam, Raab Himself and Bam's parents then travel to Finland and Estonia to find her before they go to Ruisrock. While Bam and Raab are looking for Raab's wife, Phil and April hang out with the Dudesons. Due to Glomb being on vacation, Dico hires sheep to landscape the yard, while Vito and Dunn perform research on Raab's wife's whereabouts.

== Specials ==
| Title | Original air date |
|---|---|
| "Top 10 Slams" | April 15, 2004 |
Bam and Dunn review years of old footage and show Bam's 10 all time greatest slams
| "Lost Episode: Iceland" | June 21, 2004 |
Bam and the crew get Ryan Dunn drunk and force him to make good on his drunken boast that he would go down an Icelandic waterfall sealed inside a plastic barrel. This episode can be seen on the Viva La Bands bonus DVD.
| "Viva la Top 5" | June 24, 2005 |
Bam and family camp out, counting down their favorite moments.
| "Viva la Spring Break, Pt. 1" | March 22, 2006 |
Bam and the crew head down the east coast to Miami, Florida for Spring Break in two RVs. Meanwhile, back in West Chester, April and Phil get a surprise to find out that they're being filmed by the MTV film crew.
| "Viva la Spring Break, Pt. 2" | March 22, 2006 |
Part two of the Spring Break episode.

== See also ==
- CKY
- CKY (band)
- CKY crew
- Jackass
- Viva La Bands
- Bam's World Domination
- Bam's Bad Ass Game Show
- Wildboyz
- Homewrecker
