= Bam's Bad Ass Game Show =

American television series

- Genre: Game show; Comedy; Reality television; Physical comedy; Toilet humour; Slapstick
- Created by: Bam Margera
- Developed by: David A. Hurwitz; Noah Bonnett
- Directed by: Hans van Riet
- Presented by: Bam Margera
- Narrated by: Burton Richardson
- Music by: Vanacore Music
- Country of origin: United States
- Original language: English
- No. of seasons: 1
- No. of episodes: 6

Production
- Executive producers: Bam Margera; David A. Hurwitz; Noah Bonnett
- Producers: Chris Rehnke; Chuck Stream
- Cinematography: Scott Farquharson
- Editors: Hans van Riet; Jason Gill
- Camera setup: Multiple
- Running time: 22 minutes
- Production companies: Bill's Market & Television Productions

Original release
- Network: TBS
- Release: April 14 – May 19, 2014

Related
- Viva La Bam; Bam's Unholy Union; Bam's World Domination

Bam's Bad Ass Game Show is an American game show that premiered April 14, 2014, on TBS. It featured contestants attempting to perform a series of stunts orchestrated and created by Jackass star Bam Margera. Contestants were instructed to perform a series of stunts while competing against each other, in the hope of winning a grand prize of $10,000. As well as setting up challenges for contestants, the show featured many cameo appearances by the crew themselves. The series was greenlighted for a six-episode first season in January 2013.

== Episodes ==
No.	Title	Original release date	U.S. viewers (millions)
1	"Hogtied Splashdown"	April 14, 2014	1.09
2	"It's Not a Bidet, It's a Bi-Don't"	April 21, 2014	0.94
3	"Treadmill Dump"	April 28, 2014	0.82
4	"Barrel Roll Bowling"	May 5, 2014	0.79
5	"Wheel of Misfortune"	May 12, 2014	0.72
6	"Ostrich Egg Scramble"	May 19, 2014	1.04
