= Bam's World Domination =

American television series

- Created by: Bam Margera; Lee Sosin
- Written by: Bam Margera; Lee Sosin
- Directed by: Joe DeVito
- Starring: Bam Margera; Ryan Dunn; Tim O'Connor
- Theme music composer: Vains of Jenna
- Country of origin: United Kingdom
- Original language: English
- No. of episodes: 1

Production
- Executive producers: Paul Speaker; Joe DeVito
- Producers: Bam Margera; Mike Colón; Lee Sosin
- Production locations: London, England; Wolverhampton, England; Perton, England
- Cinematography: Joe Frantz; William G. Hamilton
- Editor: Nate Pommer
- Running time: 21 minutes
- Production companies: Time Inc. Studios; Bam Margera Productions; Capital V Productions

Original release
- Network: Spike TV
- Release: October 13, 2010

Related
- Viva La Bam; Bam's Unholy Union; Bam's Bad Ass Game Show

Bam's World Domination is a half-hour television special on Spike TV that starred Bam Margera, Ryan Dunn and fellow skateboarder Tim O'Connor. The special premiered on October 13, 2010, and is a follow-up to the shows Viva La Bam and Bam's Unholy Union. According to the show's producer Joe DeVito's Twitter account, it was a one time special and no new episodes would be aired.

This first show premiered Wednesday, October 13, 2010, at 11:30 pm, ET/PT and showcased Margera, Dunn and O'Connor doing The Tough Guy Challenge in the Perton, Staffordshire, near Wolverhampton, England.
