= Dancing with the Stars (video game) =

2007 video game

- North American PS2 boxart
- Developer(s): Zoë Mode (PS2/Wii); Aurona (PC version) n-Space; Donut Publishing Ltd (2018 mobile game)
- Publisher(s): Activision (PS2/Wii); THQ and Valusoft (PC & Online versions)
- Platform(s): PlayStation 2, Wii, PC, mobile
- Release: October 23, 2007
- Genre(s): Music video game
- Mode(s): Single player, Multiplayer

Dancing with the Stars is a video game based on the TV series of the same name. It was released on October 23, 2007, in the United States. The game was also released for mobile phones and PC.

== Sequel ==
A sequel, Dancing with the Stars: We Dance!, was released October 21, 2008, for the Wii and Nintendo DS. The game is much improved on the previous ones, with score multipliers, options for new costumes and switching partners, and new songs such as Push It by Salt n' Pepa, Black Horse and the Cherry Tree by KT Tunstall and Lady Marmalade.

== Reception ==
Reception

Aggregate scores
| Aggregator | Score | | | |
| Aggregator | mobile | PC | PS2 | Wii |
|---|---|---|---|---|
| GameRankings | N/A | 35.00% | 63.33% | 53.90% |
| Metacritic | N/A | N/A | 59/100 | 42/100 |

Review scores
| Publication | Score | | | |
| Publication | mobile | PC | PS2 | Wii |
|---|---|---|---|---|
| Game Informer | N/A | N/A | N/A | 5.25/10 |
| IGN | N/A | 3.5/10 | 57/100 | N/A |
| Game Chronicles | N/A | N/A | 65/100 | 7.5/10 |
| Game Vortex | N/A | N/A | 68/100 | 52/100 |
| Gamer 2.0 | N/A | N/A | N/A | 3/10 |
| GameShark | N/A | N/A | N/A | C− |

IGN called it a lousy game.

== See also ==
- Dancing with the Stars (American TV series)
- List of Wii games
