= Skatopia =

Skatepark in Meigs County, Ohio, U.S.

Coordinates: 39°4′41.35″N 82°9′3.12″W

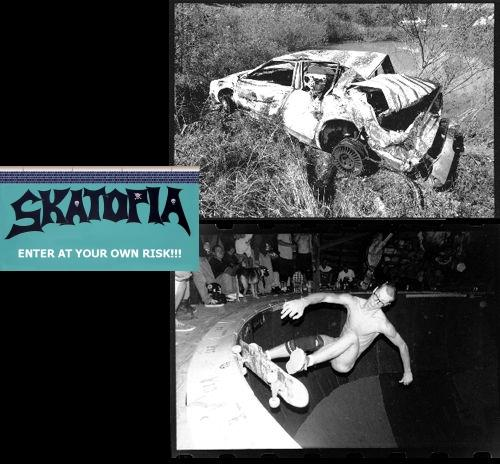
- Type: Skatepark
- Industry: Skateboarding
- Founded: 1995
- Headquarters: Rutland, Ohio, United States
- Owner: Brewce Martin
- Website: skatopia.org

Skatopia is an 88-acre (36 ha) skatepark near Rutland, Ohio, United States, owned and operated by pro skater Brewce Martin. Skatopia is known for its anarchist atmosphere and annual music festivals Bowl Bash and Backwoods Blowout. It was described by one writer as "a demented mess that meets halfway between an anarchistic Mad Maxian Thunderdome and a utopian skateboard society."

== Facilities ==
Structures include Lula Bowl, Epcot Bean, Church of Skatin', The Full Pipe, the Amity Whitelight Amphitheatre, the Skateboard Museum and, formerly, King Dong.

== Owned and operated ==
Brewce Martin became a pro skater back in 1990. Brewce moved back to West Virginia in 1995 and began working on a permanent Skatopia.

On November 1, 1995, Brewce found and purchased a permanent location for Skatopia in Meigs County, Ohio. After collecting donations from over fifty friends, and signing the contract to purchase the land, he and his pals moved the entire ramp complex to the new location.

In the summer of 2009, Brewce suffered a traumatic brain injury, caused by a tire exploding in a tire shop near Skatopia. The accident left him in a coma for six weeks, and since then, he and everyone he’s close to say that he’s no longer the same.

During his stay at the hospital, surgery was performed to relieve pressure around his brain caused by the swelling. He still has the removed chunk of his skull that he shows to visitors to Skatopia.

Brewce Martin still operates the park as of 2025.

== History ==
Martin says he built the original Skatopia in 1977 at his parents' basement using closet doors, particle board, and other odds and ends. In 1979, he built his first quarter pipe. In the 1980s, he continued building skate ramps, even after moving to Florida in 1988 to attend university. Years following, Martin would tour the world skateboarding before revisiting his dream of Skatopia.

=== Early years (1995–2003) ===
Martin moved back to West Virginia in 1995 where he started work on a permanent Skatopia on leased land at Progress Ridge near Parkersburg. During that October, Skatopia was forced out from West Virginia. Within seven days, Martin found an alternative location in nearby Meigs County, Ohio, signed a land contract to purchase the land and with a cohort of friends moved the entire ramp complex to the site. During this time, the group formed the CIA, or Citizens Instigating Anarchy, where 50 friends donated money to cover the down payment on the final resting place of Skatopia. In 2003 a writer from TransWorld Skateboarding described Skatopia as "88 Acres of Pure Skateboarding Anarchy", a term that stuck and was shortened and used as the subtitle of a later documentary.

During this time, Martin started holding annual parties called Bowl Bash and Backwoods Blow Out. Notably the Epcot Bean bowl and King Dong Ramp were constructed. In 2000, Real TV highlighted Skatopia as an extreme back yard party which increased attendance as a result. In 2002, the Full Pipe was completed and 2003 saw the Church of Skatin'. Legendary punk and skate-punk bands such as JFA, Skatanic Rednecks, and Bunjie Jambo (featuring legendary crooner: Walter "Smoove Jones" Waldo, on vocals) made appearances at Skatopia events during these years.

=== Media years (2004–2009) ===
In 2004, Skatopia was featured on the TV series Viva La Bam. The popularity of the episode led Skatopia to become the final level of the video game Tony Hawk's Underground 2 later on in 2004 and a shoe line by Draven Shoes in 2005. Headlamp Productions started filming "Skatopia: 88 Acres of Anarchy" in 2006 during which, Duane Peters visited and Brewce Martin served jail time. In late 2006, Fuel TV featured Skatopia in its "Best Backyard Scenes" countdown episode and awarded the skatepark the #1 position in the US. The documentary and ongoing coverage in the skate magazines led to Rolling Stone magazine's profile of Skatopia.

In 2009, a week before Bowl Bash XIV, Martin was severely injured by an explosion at a local tire shop. Martin was in an extended coma where he missed Bowl Bash and the Skatopia movie premiere.

=== Post accident (2010–present) ===
In early 2010, Skatopia announced American Skatefest featuring Gwar, Meat Puppets, CJ Ramone, D.I. Greg Ginn, and Agent Orange and the filming of a MTV series. MTV cut Skatopia's reality show and instead made it an episode of MTV's True Life.

Afterwards Skatopia collaborated with Bones to release a line of wheels. The Skatopia Movie DVD was released in 2011. Skatopia continues to build new skate terrain, hold its two annual parties and attract "skate pilgrims" from all over.

== Skatopia in media ==
Skatopia is the subject of the 2010 documentary film Skatopia: 88 Acres of Anarchy, produced by Headlamp Pictures (Laurie House and Colin Powers).

It was a playable level in the 2004 skateboarding video game Tony Hawk's Underground 2. In Season 2, Episode 4 of Viva La Bam, Bam Margera, Tony Hawk and the CKY crew visit Skatopia.

In 2019, Skatopia was the subject of a 23-minute mini documentary produced by Vice Media.
