= Film Tank =

British film production company

- Type: Film, Production, Television, Corporate, Community & Online
- Country: United Kingdom
- Launch date: 2009
- Official website: filmtank.co.uk

Film Tank is a film production company based in the town of Burnham-on-Sea, Somerset in the United Kingdom.

They work in all areas of film production, from generating and developing ideas to a full range of post production services. They mainly work in documentary, producing broadcast and corporate films for a variety of clients around the UK

The first film produced under the Film Tank banner was documentary Tough Guy 453. The film showed behind the scenes of the annual Tough Guy Competition in Wolverhampton. The challenge consists of a cross-country run followed by an assault course. The organizers claim that running the course involves risking barbed wire, cuts, scrapes, burns, dehydration, hypothermia, acrophobia, claustrophobia, electric shocks, sprains, twists, joint dislocation and broken bones

Tough Guy 453 proved a success, winning best factual film 2010 at several events such as Ffresh 2010, and was one of three films nominated by the Royal Television Society at their 2010 awards ceremony at The Barbican Centre in London.

Following the success of Tough Guy 453, Film Tank became involved in a follow-up film for CBBC entitled Tough Kids. It involved boys aged 11–12 competing on the Tough Guy assault course. Three of the boys tell their individual stories within the programme. The film was aired on BBC1 on 20 February 2010 as part of the "My Life" series and was produced in conjunction with Indus Films.

Since then Film Tank have worked on several commissioned films with BBC Bristol and on corporate films for clients such as The Goldsmiths Company, Morrisons, and Bridgwater College. They also cover the annual Plymouth Volksfest music festival held at Newnham Park, working recently with artist's such as Hard-Fi, Toploader, Goldie Lookin Chain, Kid Creole, The Blockheads, The Ramones, Dreadzone, Gentleman's Dub Club, Dub Pistols, Two Spot Gobi, Zion Train and Comedian Rufus Hound

Film Tank have also recently worked with award-winning filmmakers such as Paul Watson (documentary film-maker) Robb Leech & Julien Temple
