= Johnny Nuñez =

Photographer

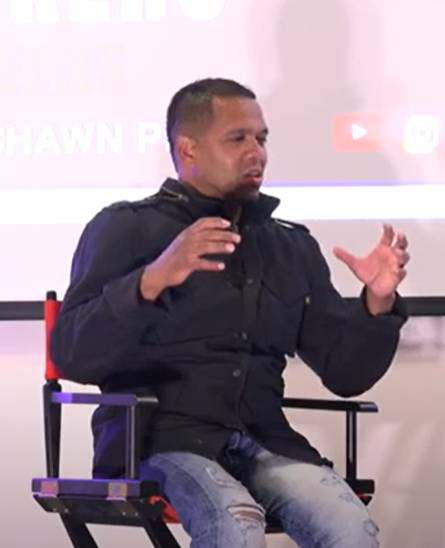
Nunez in 2019

Johnny Nuñez is a celebrity photographer turned entrepreneur. He is the founder of Nubuzzphoto and Cofounder of Followback.com. He has gained popularity in celebrity circles, including Hollywood actors, musicians, athletes, and other notable stars.

== Career ==
Although Nuñez is sometimes referred to as a paparazzo, most celebrities are happy to see him and consider him a friend. Nuñez is a contributing photographer for Wire Image, which is now owned by Getty Images. A Wire Image executive called him one of their top five connected photographers. In 2002 Nuñez became the personal photographer for the record industry executive Damon Dash, who hired Nunez to travel around the world with him. It was around this time that the story of Nuñez and Dash fighting off a gang in Paris, France occurred. For over 20 years Nuñez has been hired by and shot for many celebrities. Some of his clients include: Nas, Jay-Z, Beyonce, Drake, Sean "Diddy" Combs, Kanye West, Kim Kardashian, Jennifer Lopez, Justin Bieber and LeBron James to name a few.

Nuñez also models in campaigns for LRG, Phat Farm and Rockport. Nuñez is also featured as a character in EA's Def Jam: Icon. In the game, Ludacris orders for the player to dispose of Nuñez, and you must fight him.

Nuñez is often referred to as being tenacious and very dedicated. One of Nuñez's main ethics in the world of photography is not to take any unflattering shots of celebrities. This seems to have garnered him the respect and affection of Hollywood's elite..

The feature documentary Shooting Star (s) - The Rise of Hip Hop Photographer Johnny Nuñez by filmmakers Axel Ebermann and Daniel Frei, was awarded 'Best Documentary' at the San Diego Black Film Festival.

== Personal life ==
Nuñez was born to a Venezuelan and Trinidadian. He was adopted by a Puerto Rican family as an infant.

Nuñez attended Suffolk Community College in Brentwood, Long island.
