= Def Jam: Icon =

2007 video game

- Developer: EA Chicago
- Publisher: Electronic Arts
- Producers: Michael Mendheim; Kudo Tsunoda
- Platforms: PlayStation 3, Xbox 360
- Release: NA: March 6, 2007; AU: March 15, 2007 (X360); AU: March 22, 2007 (PS3); EU: March 23, 2007
- Genre: Fighting
- Modes: Single-player, multiplayer

Def Jam: Icon is a 3D fighting video game developed by EA Chicago and published by Electronic Arts. It was released for the PlayStation 3 and Xbox 360 in March 2007. The game is the third main installment in EA's Def Jam-licensed hip-hop video game series, and the first game in the series to not be developed by AKI Corporation. Unlike its predecessors, Def Jam Vendetta and Def Jam: Fight for NY, the game's soundtrack is completely changeable.

== Gameplay ==
Def Jam: Icon is less wrestling-oriented than the previous games, Def Jam Vendetta and Def Jam: Fight for NY. The game's executive producer, Kudo Tsunoda, has stated that he did not feel that wrestling and hip-hop went particularly well with each other. However, throws and environmental damage remain in the game.

Gameplay is similar to EA Chicago's Fight Night: Round 3, featuring a focus on up-close brawling, mixing up blocks, throws, parries, and using the right analog stick to deliver stronger attacks. Also, like Round 3, there is no in-game heads up display by default, encouraging the player to observe physical cues on in-game characters to determine their health, such as clothing, bruises and exhaustion of the opponent.

Developers aimed to make the music and the environment a much larger factor in the fight. Among the environments are streets, subways, nightclubs, penthouses, BET's 106 and Park stage, and others.

The game makes unique use of synesthesia-inspired mechanics for a fighting game, in which there is a level of interactivity between music and the stages where hazards and the entire backdrop moves to the beat of the BGM. Different events occur on the beats of each song - some of which are dangerous. For example, a column of fire shoots up from a ruined gas station on every "bass hit" of a song's chorus. Other changes will be purely cosmetic: hubcaps on cars will spin and twinkle to the beat of each song. The developers have added more damage to a fighter's punches and kicks if they occur "to the beat" or making a rapper stronger if one of their songs is playing.

By listening to the beat of the song and then timing a throw, the player can toss the opponent into an environmental hazard just as it goes off. The game features a "turntable" action, where by spinning the right analog stick allows the character to manipulate the music and the environment for both players and shows the character as if they are using a DJ turntable in mid-air. With this, the environment can be used for gaining advantage and weakening the opponents by activating the environmental hazards when they are near. During the match, fighters bleed and show visible signs of their injuries.

=== Characters ===
The game features 29 playable characters, including real-life hip hop artists signed to Def Jam at the time, as well as original characters. Funkmaster Flex, Russell Simmons, Kevin Liles, Mayra Verónica, Christine Dolce and Melyssa Ford appear as non playable characters.

Base roster		Unlockables	
Big Boi; Bun B; E-40; Ghostface Killah; Jim Jones; Kano; Lil Jon; Ludacris	Mike Jones; Paul Wall; Redman; Sean Paul; T.I.; Tego; The Game; Young Jeezy	Big Herk; Boyd; Dae Dae; Dr. Chang; Fast Hal; Fat Joe; Greer	Johnny Nunez; Method Man (as Gooch); Sticky Fingaz (as Wink); Troy Dollar; Wheatly

== "Build a Label" ==
The game's story mode, called "Build a Label", starts when the player is obligated to create his own "suspect" on an FBI computer. The player can edit every aspect of the character's body and choose his fighting style and fighting song. The songs available at the start are "Got It Sewed Up (Remix)" by Mike Jones, "Back Then" also by Mike Jones, "Soul Survivor" by Young Jeezy featuring Akon, "I Do This", also by Young Jeezy, "Go Hard Or Go Home" by E-40, "Tell Me When to Go" also by E-40 featuring Keak da Sneak, "Sittin' Sidewayz" by Paul Wall featuring Big Pokey, and "Trill" by Paul Wall featuring Bun B and B.G. Also available at the start are two fighting styles: Ghetto Blaster and Street Kwon Do. It is worth noting that the artists of the four songs initially offered are not accessible to sign while the other artists of the other songs are accessible to sign.

After creating a character, the story starts in a sequence where DJ Funkmaster Flex can be heard speaking to his audience on the radio with the instrumental of "I Do This" by Young Jeezy playing in the background. The camera pans through several sections of a neighborhood, including a building with a promotional poster for T.I. vs T.I.P. on the side. By the time Funkmaster Flex is done talking, the camera shows a child, Kevin (Kevin Liles Jr.), walking down the street with his friend Jake (Terrence Hardy) while bouncing a basketball. Kevin then spots Curtis Carver (Kevin Liles), a mogul in the music industry, speaking with his record label's vice president, Playa (Avery Kidd Waddell). The camera then shifts to Carver, who is still speaking with Playa, when is suddenly interrupted by Kevin, accompanied by Jake. Kevin then asks Carver for his autograph. While Carver signs Kevin's basketball, he asks the children whether they're staying out of trouble. After handing Kevin back his basketball, Carver also gives him and Jake some money and advises them to pursue careers in basketball, adding that it will bring them financial success. While Kevin and Jake walk away, gunshots are heard and Carver can be seen falling to the ground. Kevin and Jake run away, and Playa can be seen looking at Carver while his blood spreads around his torso on the ground.

== Reception ==
Reception

Aggregate score
Aggregator	Score	
Aggregator	PS3	Xbox 360
Metacritic	68/100	69/100

Review scores
Publication	Score	
Publication	PS3	Xbox 360
1Up.com	C+	C+
Edge	N/A	5/10
Electronic Gaming Monthly	6.83/10	6.83/10
Eurogamer	N/A	5/10
Game Informer	7.75/10	7.75/10
GamePro	N/A	4/5
GameRevolution	B	B
GameSpot	8.1/10	8.1/10
GameSpy	3/5	3/5
GameTrailers	6.3/10	6.3/10
GameZone	7.9/10	9/10
IGN	6.7/10	7/10
Official Xbox Magazine (US)	N/A	8/10
The A.V. Club	B−	B−
Detroit Free Press	3/4	3/4

While the game received mixed to positive reviews from critics and game critics, the game received "average" reviews on both platforms according to video game review aggregator Metacritic.

IGN praised the uncensored soundtrack, "beautifully rendered" visuals and the "My Soundtrack" feature on the former version, but criticized "weak fighting moves" and "inconsistent game mechanics". GameSpot, however, became more positive, stating that it "plays well enough, but it really shines thanks to its crazy story and healthy roster."

Detroit Free Press gave the game three stars out of four and said it was "just two hairs short of a masterpiece. EA and Def Jam have set the bar really high for fighting games." The New York Times gave it an average review and stated that "While Icon is the best looking of the Def Jam games, the combat system isn't quite as entertaining, dropping the previous games' over-the-top wrestling moves for more straightforward street fighting. It's not a bad system, but it's just not as wild and entertaining." The A.V. Club gave it a B− and said that "Even if you don't own every Ludacris album, watching the rich environments rattle to the music is reason enough to give this a play. Just don't expect much depth from this beat 'em up."
