= Dancing with the Stars: We Dance! =

2008 video game

- Developers: Zoë Mode (Wii); Jet Black Games (DS)
- Publisher: Activision
- Series: Dancing with the Stars
- Platforms: Wii, Nintendo DS
- Release: NA: October 21, 2008
- Genre: Rhythm
- Modes: Single-player, multiplayer

Gameplay screenshot

Dancing with the Stars: We Dance! (also called Dancing with the Stars: Get Your Dance On!) is a video game based on Dancing with the Stars. It is the sequel to the original Dancing with the Stars game. It is on Activision's "Wee 1st" label. The game's subtitle, We Dance, was derived from the Namco-Bandai games; We Ski and We Cheer, also for the Wii.

== Overview ==
The game features stars including Mel B, Apolo Anton Ohno, Joey Fatone and Jennie Garth and new professional dancers including Derek Hough and his sister Julianne Hough. The Wii version enhances the original with refined controls using the Wii Remote and Nunchuk, as well as the addition of new special “flair” moves. The Nintendo DS version, meanwhile, includes features such as customizable outfits and the ability to swap partners.

== Key features ==
- All new stars from past seasons
- 8 new professional dancers: Including two-time champion Julianne Hough and six-time champion Derek Hough
- 40 New Songs
- Engaging Dance Mechanics: All new, special flair moves. Improved gameplay includes score multipliers.
- On the DS version, it is possible to put two celebrities or two professional partners together.

== Couples ==
- Cameron Mathison & Edyta Sliwinska (5th Place in Season 5)
- Hélio Castroneves & Julianne Hough (1st Place in Season 5, 10th Place in Season 15 with Chelsie Hightower)
- Drew Lachey & Cheryl Burke (1st Place in Season 2, 11th Place in Season 15 with Anna Trebunskaya)
- Mel B & Maksim Chmerkovskiy (2nd Place in Season 5)
- Jennie Garth & Derek Hough (4th Place in Season 5)
- Apolo Anton Ohno & Julianne Hough (1st Place in Season 4, 5th Place in Season 15 with Karina Smirnoff)
- Joey Fatone & Kym Johnson (2nd Place in Season 4, 12th Place in Season 15)
- Jane Seymour & Tony Dovolani (6th Place in Season 5)
- Sabrina Bryan & Louis van Amstel (7th Place in Season 5 with Mark Ballas, 8th Place in Season 15)
- Mark Cuban & Kym Johnson (8th Place in Season 5)

Notes: Sabrina Bryan's original partner was Mark Ballas. However, in the all-star season, her partner is Louis Van Amstel. But, the all-star season did not exist until fall 2012. Chelsie Hightower did not become a professional competitor until season 8 in Spring 2009, and is therefore excluded from the game. Julianne Hough became a judge in 2014.

== Dances ==
- Mambo
- Jive
- Samba
- Cha-cha-cha
- Tango
- Waltz
