= Bam Margera =

American skateboarder and stuntman (born 1979)

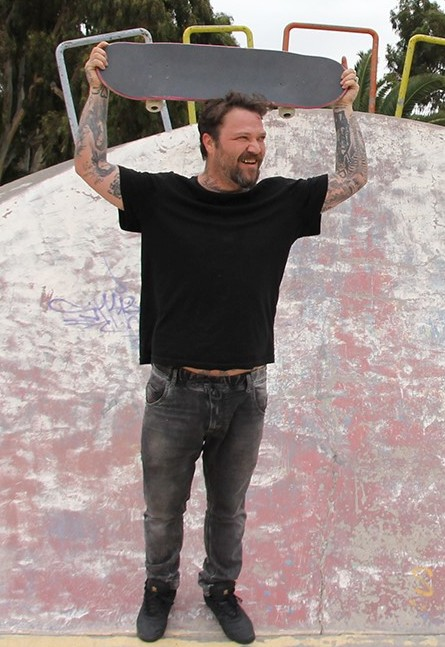
- Margera in 2017
- Born: Brandon Cole Margera; September 28, 1979 (age 47)
- Occupations: Skateboarder; stunt performer; television personality; filmmaker; musician
- Years active: 1997–present
- Known for: Co-star of Jackass; Viva La Bam
- Spouses: Missy Rothstein (m. 2007; div. 2012); Nicole Boyd (m. 2013; div. 2023); Dannii Marie (m. 2024)
- Partner: Jennifer Rivell (1998–2005)
- Children: 1
- Parents: Phil Margera (father); April Margera (mother)
- Relatives: Jess Margera (brother); Vincent Margera (uncle)
- Sports career
- Country: United States
- Sport: Skateboarding
- Turned pro: 1998
- Website: bamcollection.com

Brandon Cole "Bam" Margera (/mɑːrˈdʒɛərə/ mar-JAIR-ə; born September 28, 1979) is an American professional skateboarder, stunt performer, television personality, and filmmaker. He rose to prominence in the early 2000s as one of the stars of the MTV reality stunt show Jackass (2000–2001) and subsequent films. Margera also created the spin-off shows Viva La Bam (2003–2006), Bam's Unholy Union (2007), Bam's World Domination (2010), and Bam's Bad Ass Game Show (2014), and co-wrote and directed the films Haggard (2003) and Minghags (2009).

Since the mid-2000s, Margera has struggled with alcoholism and subsequent legal troubles. Following the death of childhood friend Ryan Dunn and the end of his television projects between 2011 and 2012, Margera's drinking and drug use aggravated. More notably, in 2021, he was fired from the production of Jackass Forever (2022) due to his drug and alcohol issues.

== Early life and CKY videos ==
Margera was born on September 28, 1979, and raised in West Chester, Pennsylvania, the son of April and Phil Margera. He is the younger brother of rock musician Jess Margera and the nephew of television personality Vincent "Don Vito" Margera. When Margera was three years old, his grandfather nicknamed him "Bam Bam" after noticing his habit of purposely running into walls; over time, that nickname was shortened to "Bam" by his schoolmates. Before their television fame, Margera's parents, April and Phil, worked as a hairdresser and baker, respectively.

Margera received his first video camera from his father as a gift in 1993 after he enrolled in a digital media class at his school with childhood friend Chris Raab. It was here that Margera and Raab met future collaborators and close friends Art Webb, Brandon DiCamillo, and Ryan Dunn. Soon after, they began shooting homemade videos of Margera and his friends skateboarding and doing stunts, which eventually evolved into the CKY video series. CKY is an abbreviation of "Camp Kill Yourself", a name shared with his brother Jess Margera's band, CKY, which was named as a tribute to the film Sleepaway Camp (1983).

In 1994, Margera dropped out of school after Chris Raab was expelled, but was homeschooled by his mother and received his GED. On September 21, 1995, Margera, his brother Jess, Dunn and Raab were all involved in a serious car accident near their hometown of West Chester, PA. In later interviews, Margera revealed that Raab had "forced him" to wear a seatbelt as the car was going nearly 100 mph (160 km/h), and that doing so probably saved his life. Other than Jess suffering a broken arm, none of the four were seriously injured.

Following years of recording footage and editing, Margera independently released the first CKY film, then titled CKY: Landspeed, in 1999. The film is a collection of stunts and pranks interspersed with skateboarding tricks and footage set to music by CKY. Subsequent releases of the film have removed the Landspeed subtitle. In the following years, the sequels CKY2K, CKY3 and CKY4: The Latest and Greatest were released. These early videos feature many of Margera's family members, including his parents and brother, as well as his close friends, including Dunn, Raab, DiCamillo, Rake Yohn and Brandon Novak, who formed a loose collective known as the CKY crew. During this period, the videos and band projects were heavily interlinked, with two of the band's albums being unofficial soundtracks to the videos.

== Career ==
=== Television and film ===
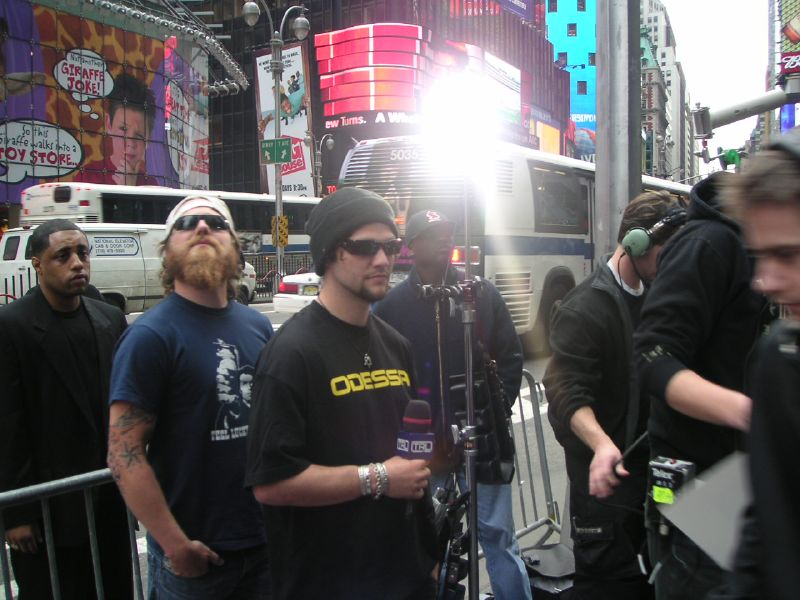
Margera (center) with Ryan Dunn (second from left; blue shirt) during a live shoot in New York in April 2004

Following CKY's success, particularly within the skateboarding community, former Big Brother editor Jeff Tremaine took notice of Margera's videos and recruited him and Ryan Dunn into the main team that would eventually become MTV's Jackass. Both Margera and Dunn became mainstays of the cast, while the other CKY crew members played supporting roles to various degrees. In the original television series, several of the featured stunts were taken directly from the CKY videos. Margera would go on to appear in Jackass: The Movie (2002), Jackass Number Two (2006), Jackass 2.5 (2007), Jackass 3D (2010), and Jackass 3.5 (2011), and would have a very minor appearance in Jackass Forever (2022). He only appears in archive footage in Jackass: Best and Last (2026). Several skits in the first Jackass movie were CKY-style pieces filmed in and around West Chester, PA, while similar scenes in the second movie were forced to be removed after the arrest and conviction of Margera's uncle Vincent Margera (also known as Don Vito) for inappropriately touching two minors.

After the Jackass series ended in 2001, Margera was approached by MTV and was given his own series, Viva La Bam, which ran for five seasons from 2003 to 2005. A mixture of stunts and reality, the show followed Margera, his family and the CKY crew as they performed various stunts and missions, while also offering insight into their daily lives. The show was primarily filmed in West Chester, but also visited New Orleans, Las Vegas, Los Angeles, Brazil, Finland, Mexico, Netherlands, France, Germany, Austria, Switzerland, Monaco, and Transylvania. In addition to the regular series, there was also a "lost" episode, which was included on the Viva La Bands CD and was originally filmed in Iceland for the first season. A two-part special episode, "Viva La Spring Break", aired in 2006.

In 2003, Margera played himself in the movie Grind, which portrays four young men following a professional skateboarder from Chicago to California. The film contains numerous cameos by Jackass members, as well as many professional skateboarders and other celebrities. Upon its release, the film was met with generally unfavorable reviews from critics.

In 2007, Margera's engagement and wedding planning was filmed for a series entitled Bam's Unholy Union, which served as a spiritual successor to Viva la Bam. The show follows Margera, his then-fiancée Missy Rothstein, and their family and friends in the lead-up to their wedding. In 2008, Margera had a "prominent, non-sex role" in a pornographic film by Gina Lynn, The Fantasstic Whores 4, along with Brandon Novak. In 2009, Margera appeared on Nitro Circus, and the following year in 2010, Margera starred alongside Ryan Dunn and skateboarder Tim O'Connor in the one-off special Bam's World Domination on Spike TV, which showcased Margera and his friends' attempt to conquer an obstacle course race in the Tough Guy Competition, held in Staffordshire, England.

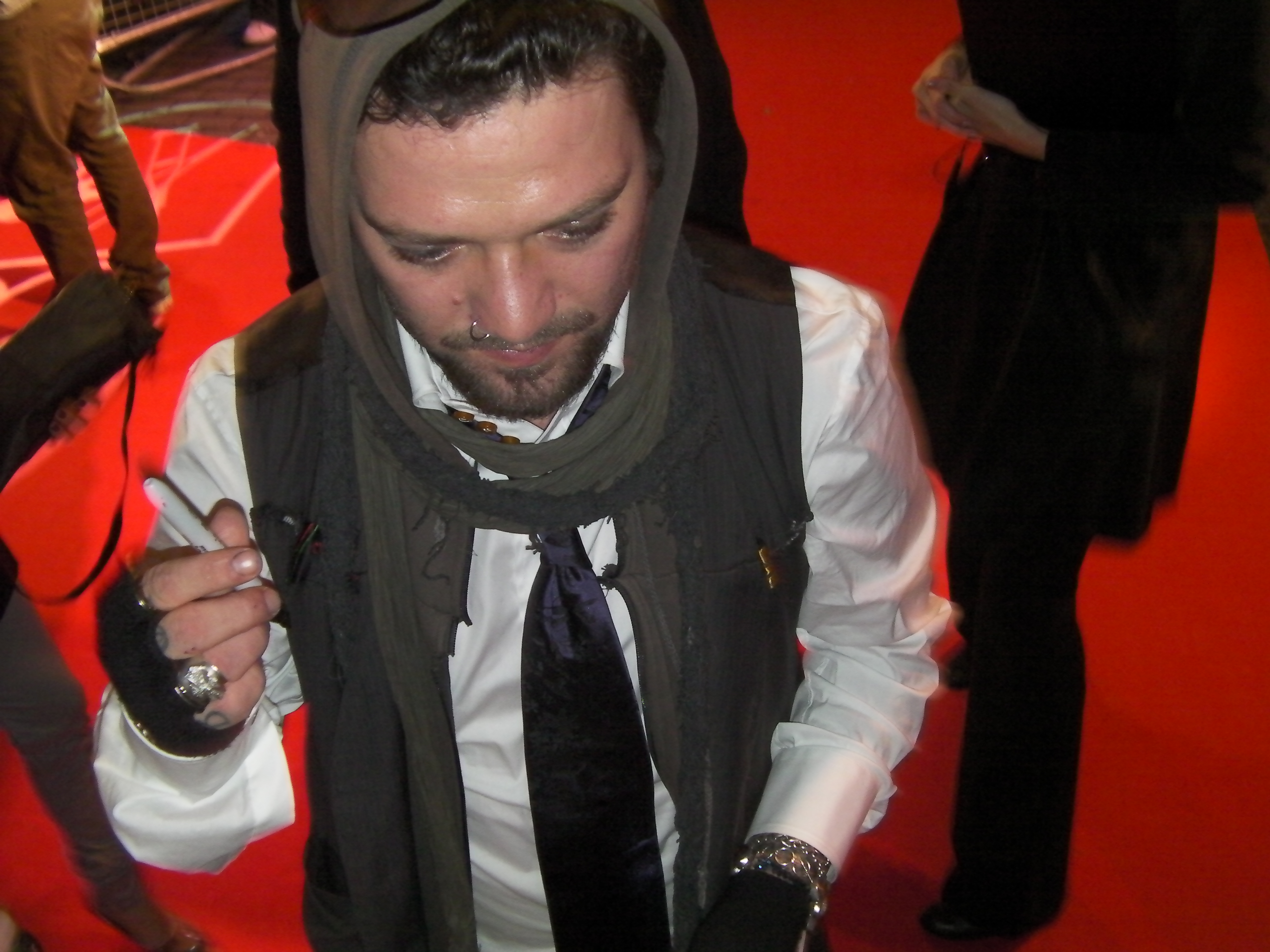
Margera at the Jackass 3D London premiere in 2010

In March 2016, Bam and his parents appeared on the VH1 reality television show Family Therapy with Dr. Jenn to address Bam's self-destructive behavior.

=== Skateboarding career ===
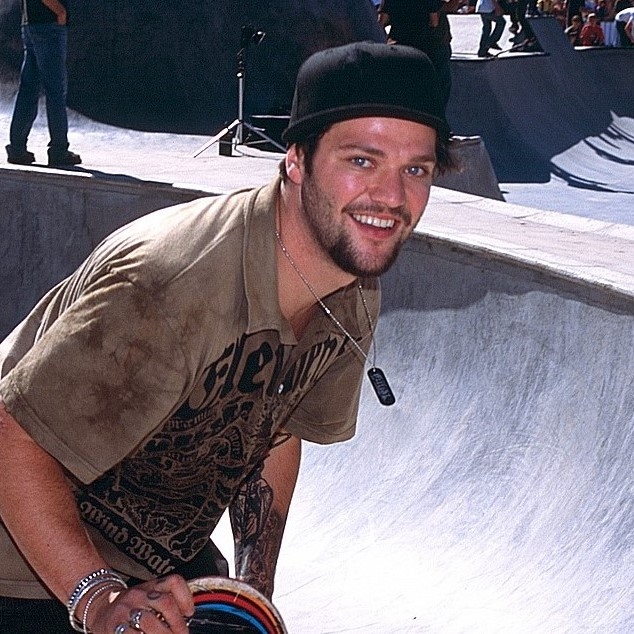
Margera skateboarding in 2006

Margera began skateboarding at age 7, and by the time he entered high school, had developed it into a full-time hobby. His brother Jess later described Bam's abilities as "a natural talent" and noted that their parents had been very supportive of Margera's decision to go into skateboarding "from day one", and revealed that he used to travel with Bam to Love Park in Philadelphia as early as 1991, when they were 12 and 13 years old, respectively. In 1992, Margera got his first sponsorship from Fairman's Skate Shop and began appearing in skate videos. In 1994, Margera dropped out of high school in order to pursue a full-time skateboarding career.

Early on in his professional career, Margera was sponsored by Toy Machine Skateboards, Speed Metal Bearings, Adio Footwear, Electric Sunglasses, Volcom, Landspeed Wheels, Destroyer Trucks, Destructo Trucks, and Fairman's Skate Shop. In 2001, Margera officially became a member of Team Element, the demonstration team for Element Skateboards, which he remained affiliated with for the rest of his professional career.

In 2012, Margera was forced to put his skating career on hold indefinitely due to bone spurs and worsening alcoholism. After a five-year hiatus, Bam returned to skateboarding casually, resulting in a renewed partnership with Element Skateboards to celebrate the brand's 25th anniversary in 2017, by re-releasing ten of his most memorable deck designs. The boards were released weekly between September 6 and November 8, 2017; each deck was also personally signed by Margera and limited to 50 units.

In addition to collaborating with Heart Supply Skateboards and Wicked Skateboards, in 2025, Margera collaborated with Zero Skateboards to release various limited edition skate decks, which all sold out quickly.

As of 2026, Margera is collaborating with Slappy Trucks to release a signature collection of skate trucks.

Following Margera's collaborations with Zero Skateboards, he returned to pro skateboarding, signing with Zero.

=== Independent films ===
Margera has written, produced and starred in three independent films as of 2024, with a fourth scheduled, but on hold since 2017. He co-wrote, directed and starred in Haggard (2003), an independent film based on real events in the life of his friend Ryan Dunn. Dunn played himself as the main character, while Margera played "Valo", a character based on a combination of himself and elements of HIM singer and friend Ville Valo.

Margera also directed Minghags, formerly titled Kiss a Good Man's Ass. This film is a loose sequel to Haggard and features the "garbage juicer" invention from that film. Filming began April 5, 2007. On an episode of Radio Bam, Margera said that they were trying to make the movie PG-13 rated, but with the amount of swearing and a shot of nudity, an R rating could not be avoided. The first viewing of the rough version of the film was on August 7, 2007, at Sikes Hall. The movie was released straight to DVD in December 2008.

Also in December 2008, Margera released a Christmas-themed movie, Bam Margera Presents: Where the #$&% Is Santa?. The movie is about Bam and his friends going to the Arctic Circle in Finland on a quest to find Santa Claus. The film features Ville Valo from HIM, the Dudesons, Hanoi Rocks, and Mark the Bagger.

In January 2015, Margera announced that he had been working on an autobiographical documentary film which he hoped to premiere in the near future. The film will deal primarily with Margera's life after the death of his close friend and co-star, Ryan Dunn, who died in a car crash in 2011. According to Margera, the film has been three years in the making, and will give viewers a glimpse into his childhood, career and rise to fame, while focusing mainly on his recovery from the death of Dunn. Musician Brent Hinds of the band Mastodon would play Dunn in what has been described as "dramatic fantasy interludes" that ties the film together while also re-enacting what Margera considers his "darkest moments" after Dunn's death. Hinds died in August 2025.

During a Facebook Q&A on December 7, 2015, Margera stated that the name of the film would change from I Need Time to Stay Useless to Earth Rocker and that it would be released February 2016. In a 2017 episode of Vice's Epicly Later'd, Margera stated that after working on the film for four years straight, sometimes for weeks at a time, he had reached the point where he had had enough of doing so. Margera stated that he had approximately eleven terabytes worth of video footage and that editing it down into a two-hour film was "impossible". When asked if the project was simply on pause for the moment, Margera responded that it was.

As of 2026, the documentary still remains unreleased, with no scheduled release date.

=== Radio Bam and music ===
Margera began a weekly Sirius Satellite Radio show on Sirius channel 28 Faction on November 24, 2004, called Radio Bam. The show initially featured Margera and his friends from the CKY and Jackass crews, while later shows featured less of the two crews and more of Margera's newer friends. In 2005, Margera formed a music label, Filthy Note Records, and has since directed music videos for Clutch, Turbonegro, Viking Skull, Vains of Jenna and several for CKY. He also directed four music videos, "Buried Alive by Love", "The Sacrament", "And Love Said No", and "Solitary Man", for the Finnish band HIM, as well as directing three videos for The 69 Eyes: "Lost Boys", "Dead Girls Are Easy" and "Dead N Gone".

A competent amateur musician, Margera also played keyboards in a novelty band called Gnarkill along with his brother Jess Margera, Brandon DiCamillo, Rich Vose and Matt Cole. The group released two albums, Gnarkill in 2003 and Gnarkill vs. Unkle Matt and the Shitbirdz in 2006. Margera also plays guitar, frequently seen doing so in episodes of Viva La Bam.

Since 2013, Margera has featured in two musical projects; Fuckface Unstoppable, which was written about in 2013 on the Buddyhead website in an article questioning the seriousness of the band ("a joke band(?)"). The band featured Margera, Jess Margera, his then-partner Nikki Boyd, and Brandon Novak. Chad Ginsburg, of CKY, was the band's guitarist before quitting. Matt Deis, also of CKY, performed with the band as well. The band released their debut album FFU in May 2014 through Artery Records.

A second project, The Evesdroppers, featuring Bam, Jess, Nikki, Mike Nappi, and Chad Ginsburg, released a self-titled album in September 2016 through the label Casual Madness.

=== Other projects ===
Since 2001, Margera has been heavily featured as a character in the Tony Hawk's video game franchise, specifically Tony Hawk's Pro Skater 3, Tony Hawk's Pro Skater 4, Tony Hawk's Underground, Tony Hawk's Underground 2, Tony Hawk's American Wasteland, Tony Hawk's Project 8, Tony Hawk's Proving Ground, and Tony Hawk's Pro Skater 3 + 4. Margera's appearance in the latter was a last-minute addition to the game before its release, reportedly due to intervention from Tony Hawk who personally lobbied to have Margera included in the game's roster despite Activision's initial objections.

Margera also voiced a character in the video game Scarface: The World Is Yours. He also made a cameo appearances in the movie Destroying America.

In late September 2008, Margera opened a bar/theater called "The Note", in his hometown of West Chester, Pennsylvania. Over time, however, serious restrictions from West Chester Borough Council caused a multitude of issues for Margera and the bar, and The Note finally closed its doors in January 2014.

In late 2009, Margera released a book containing private writings and pictures titled Serious as Dog Dirt.

In 2020, Margera began appearing in YouTube videos, including a viral water balloon fight video with model Jeb Carty. As of 2026, Margera can frequently be seen on the Dern Brothers YouTube channel, where he skates casually with the brothers and their friends, as well as reminiscing over his long career.

Margera is currently the host of the fifth season of Fishtank, the online reality tv livestream show co-created by comedian Sam Hyde of comedy group Million Dollar Extreme.

== Personal life ==
Margera owns two houses in the West Chester area – his current residence and his former home, known as "Castle Bam", which he bought in 2004. Castle Bam is a large house in Pocopson Township, Pennsylvania, that was often featured on Viva La Bam. The house has a gothic theme, a skatepark in the driveway, and is situated on 14 acres (5.7 hectares) of land. In January 2007, Margera built a ramp in the backyard, which caused trouble with the township.

In 2018, Margera's mother, April, began renovating the home in order for it to be used for short-term rentals via Airbnb. Margera has made it known that the home will not look the way it did on Viva La Bam. Rentals of the home were expected to be made available in 2018.

In an October 24, 2007, interview with the Cleveland Free Times, Margera stated that although he had completed paperwork that would legally change his first name to Bam, he was "still debating" filing it after having a conversation with his father.

=== Relationships ===
In 1998, Margera began a long-term relationship with Jenn Rivell, who played a prominent part in several of his projects. By the time of Viva La Bam, the couple were regularly living together in Margera's home. Their seven-year relationship ended in 2005. A year later in November 2006, Margera filed for "protection from abuse" from Rivell after she allegedly broke into his house.

In 2006, Margera became engaged to childhood friend Melissa "Missy" Rothstein. The events leading up to their wedding (with about 350 friends and family in attendance) on February 3, 2007, in downtown Philadelphia, Pennsylvania, were all chronicled on the MTV series Bam's Unholy Union. The couple spent their honeymoon in Dubai. In 2008, during an appearance on LA Ink, Margera told Kat Von D that he has caused $13,000 in damages during his wedding celebration, explaining, "I was kind of ready for it, though. I was like, 'I'm inviting the Jackass crew. If something doesn't get broken, then that's not right.'"

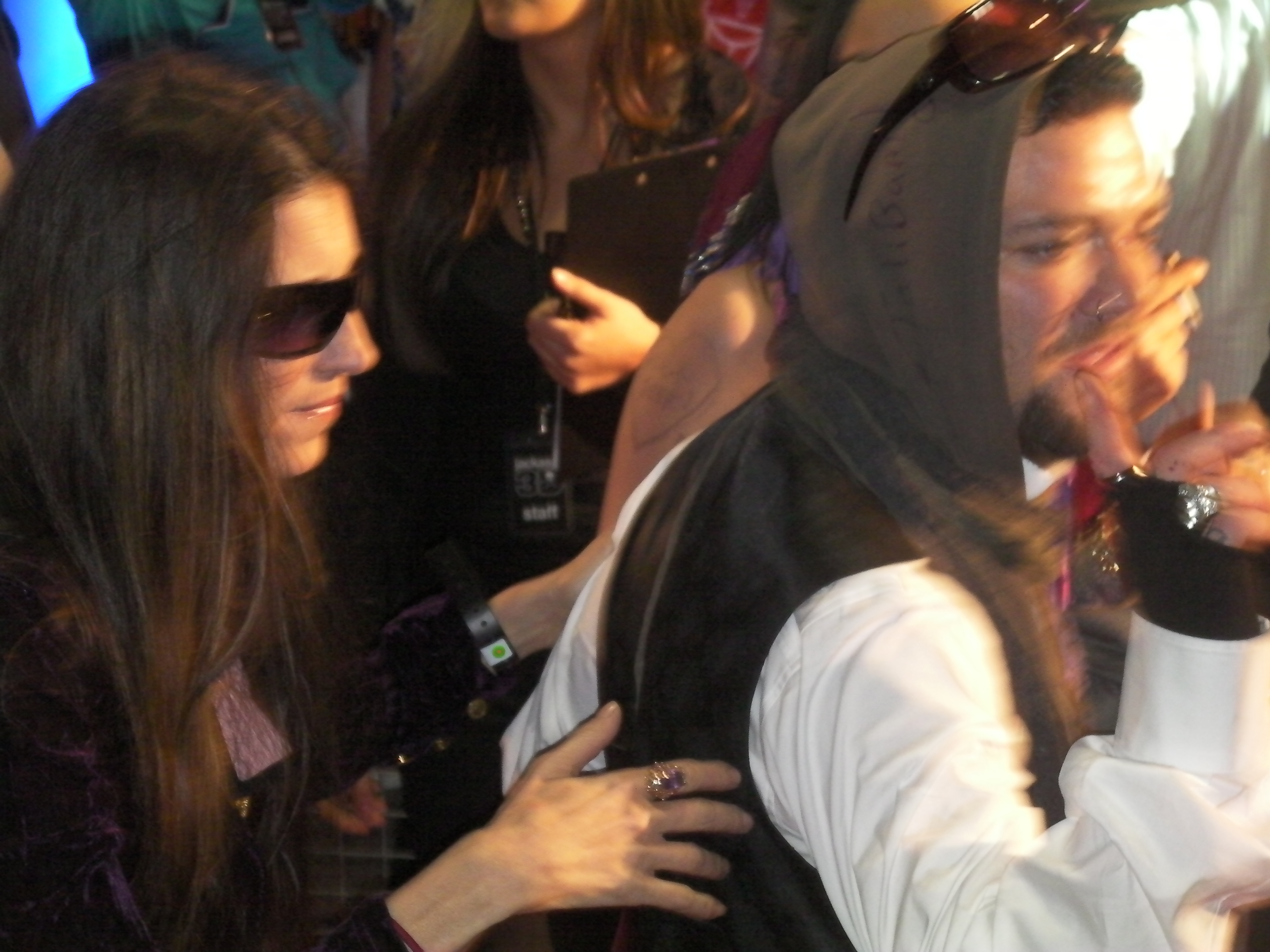
Missy and Bam Margera

In October 2010, Margera told Howard Stern that he and Rothstein were now living in separate cities and meeting once a week, and that Rothstein was aware about Bam's other girlfriends. The couple officially divorced in November 2012.

On October 5, 2013, Margera married Nicole Boyd in Reykjavík, Iceland. In June 2017, Margera announced that Boyd was pregnant with the couple's first child. In September, it was announced that the child, a boy, would be named Phoenix Wolf. Margera's son was born in December of that year.

On September 16, 2021, Boyd filed for child custody of their son Phoenix Wolf. However, she did not file a divorce petition to end her and Margera's eight-year marriage. On February 15, 2023, Boyd filed for legal separation and spousal support, citing "irreconcilable differences". The couple has been living separately since 2021. Legal documents further state that Boyd was seeking physical and legal custody and that Margera could have unsupervised parental visitation, so long as he and his son remain within Los Angeles County. The documents further detail that Boyd's reasoning for filing for separation was based on Margera behaving inappropriately while spending time with their son, leading Boyd to believe Margera was under the influence. Eventually, a judge ruled that Margera and Boyd were never officially married, with Margera stating that everyone had already known this.

In July 2023, Margera began dating model Dannii Marie. He proposed to her in October of that same year. The two were married on May 28, 2024, and are still together as of the present day.

=== Health and alcoholism ===
Margera has had an extensive history of alcohol and drug abuse since his early twenties, and could be frequently seen drinking and/or intoxicated on-camera in Viva La Bam, Bam's Unholy Union, and in the Jackass films. In July 2009, Margera was taken to the hospital by paramedics and state troopers after a four-day alcohol binge. His drinking habits had only worsened after his previous shows ended in 2007. In December 2009, Margera entered rehab for the first time after an intervention from his friends and family, but did not complete the program, leaving after only four days. Following his close friend Ryan Dunn's death in 2011, Margera's drinking intensified even further, and by Margera's own account, he considers 2012 as the year he lost control of his drinking, both due to Dunn's death, and also due to bone spurs forcing him to put his skating career on hold, to which Margera admits he began binge drinking "to kill the boredom".

In 2015, Margera entered rehab for a second time for alcoholism, but again left shortly after without finishing the program. Later that year, he took part in Family Therapy with Dr. Jenn on VH1 with his mother, April Margera, after which he remained sober for several months. Margera later revealed how his unhealthy lifestyle had forced him to relearn how to skate after five years of not doing so, and had also left him overweight. Margera then moved to Tallinn, Estonia, for five months in order to get in better shape. After getting in better shape, he relocated to Barcelona, Spain, with his family to focus on his skating career in late 2016, but soon moved back to Pennsylvania in 2017, shortly before his son was born. In a 90-minute interview with YouTube series The Nine Club recorded and released in November 2017, Margera discussed his various health issues and alcoholism at length, claiming that he had been "mostly sober" since 2015.

In January 2018, Margera entered rehab for the third time after a DUI, and remained sober for seven months. Later that year, he relapsed after being robbed at gunpoint during a vacation in Colombia. In January 2019, one year after his previous attempt, Margera entered rehab once more, but left after ten days, stating that he "didn't belong there", and was planning on beating his alcoholism on his own. In March 2019, TMZ released a video showing Margera screaming at and threatening his manager at West Side Comedy Club in New York City. Additionally, Margera made Instagram posts in which he insulted his wife and damaged his own home, leading to friends and family members coming together to have Margera committed to a mental health treatment facility. Margera was released from treatment and returned home after one week.

On August 3, 2019, a drunken Margera was removed from a commercial airline flight following an altercation with an airport police officer, who told him he was too intoxicated to fly. The following day, Margera posted a chain of videos on his Instagram account, publicly pleading for Dr. Phil's help. He directed a lengthy tirade towards his mother April, his then-wife Nikki Margera, and his childhood friend Brandon Novak, candidly stating his relationship with his family is "broken". Dr. Phil responded to Margera's pleas the next morning, referring him to a treatment center following a one-on-one session.

On May 17, 2022, Margera announced that he had completed one year of sobriety treatment. He then relapsed less than a month later, and on June 15, Margera was reported missing after fleeing his rehab center. He was found and voluntarily returned to rehab after being gone for a week. Margera was returned with police escort since he was in the rehabilitation facility under court order. On June 26, 2022, Margera was reported missing once again after fleeing his rehab center for the second time. He was again found and checked in to a new treatment facility on June 27, 2022. Margera was then spotted at a bar after fleeing rehab once again on September 4, 2022. On September 25, 2022, it was reported that Margera was caught intoxicated in a bar in Atlanta, Georgia, amid rehab problems.

On December 9, 2022, it was reported that Margera was hospitalized and put on a ventilator in a San Diego ICU due to a combination of pneumonia and COVID-19. He was released from the hospital the next day. On Steve-O's Wild Ride! podcast, Margera disclosed that he also suffered from four seizures before he got to the hospital, and suffered another one during his stay at the hospital.

On February 15, 2023, Margera's then-wife Nikki officially filed for legal separation and spousal support, citing "irreconcilable differences". Legal documents detailed that her reasoning for filing for separation was based on Margera behaving inappropriately while spending time with their son, leading Boyd to believe Margera was under the influence of alcohol.

On March 29, 2023, Margera was arrested for public intoxication.

On May 26, 2023, it was reported that Margera wants a judge to dismiss his divorce with his wife Nikki, as she is not allowing him to see their son. On June 1, 2023, Margera posted a video to Instagram threatening to smoke crack until he is dead unless he sees his son. By June 4, police had located and taken custody of Margera in Los Angeles, California, after which he was involuntarily committed to a mental health facility for evaluation via a 5150 hold.

On September 23, 2024, it was reported that Margera was arrested again after he allegedly violated his probation. He was put in the Chester County Prison, and was ordered to undergo a drug and alcohol evaluation.

=== Legal issues ===
On June 12, 2010, Margera was allegedly attacked with a baseball bat outside his bar, The Note. Margera spent the night at Crozer-Chester Medical Center, where he was treated for head injuries. According to the alleged assailant, Elizabeth Ray, the altercation began because Margera allegedly called her a "nigger". However, Ray denies physically attacking Margera. Margera has since denied having ever said the word, claiming "I called her a crazy bitch and an idiot, but I definitely didn't use the n-word".

In July 2013, Margera was arrested at Keflavík Airport in Iceland, having left the country without paying damages following a rental car dispute the year before. Margera had rented a Toyota Land Cruiser during a vacation in Iceland in 2012, which he had returned in "terrible shape" five days later, but left the country before paying for the damage. Margera was released later the same day after paying the outstanding fees, and admitted in an interview that he had trashed the car in a drunken stupor.

On March 2, 2023, Margera was arrested for domestic violence, after he allegedly kicked a woman. He was released from custody after he posted a $50,000 bail the next day. On April 23, 2023, police were dispatched to Margera's home after he allegedly made death threats to his brother, Jess, and subsequently punched him in the face. Margera reportedly fled on foot into the woods when police arrived. After being on the run for three days and allegedly making several threatening phone calls to his family, Margera eventually surrendered to Pennsylvania Police. Later, Margera released a statement saying the allegations made by his brother, Jess, were false.

Around June 7, 2023, Margera was placed on 5150 psychiatric hold at a Los Angeles mental health facility, following disturbing text messages Margera had been sending family members, and erratic speech and behavior when he was located by police.

Additionally, Margera encountered further legal issues in Delaware County when he was arrested for public intoxication and disorderly conduct. Prosecutors questioned whether his bail should be revoked due to these incidents, prompting Margera to appear before Judge Patrick Carmody and pledge his commitment to sobriety. The judge allowed Margera to remove his ankle bracelet temporarily to assess his alcohol use, with a warning of consequences for any future violations.

==== Jackass firing ====
During a January 2021 interview, Margera revealed that owing to his behavior over the last few years, Jackass co-creator Jeff Tremaine had to fight with the studio to keep Margera in the next Jackass film, Jackass Forever (2022), and that Margera still was not certain that Paramount Pictures was ultimately going to allow him to partake in the filming of the movie, and that it all depended on his sobriety and behavior. On February 11, 2021, Margera posted several videos to his Instagram account, in which he admitted to breaking his sobriety, and indicated that he had been fired from the filming of Jackass Forever, which was officially confirmed soon after. Throughout the video, he could be seen crying, vomiting, and alluding to having looked up "how to tie a noose" before his move to Oceanside, California.

Margera alleged that Paramount had been forcing him to take antidepressants, submit to random urine tests, and had forced him to check in to two different rehabilitation facilities using his own money. He also expressed great disdain for Tremaine, Johnny Knoxville, and Spike Jonze before asking his fans to boycott Jackass Forever, as well as to send him money so he could shoot his own movie to compete with the film. All of the videos were removed from Margera's Instagram account shortly after being posted.

On May 25, 2021, it was reported that Jeff Tremaine had filed a temporary restraining order against Margera, due to the latter's harassment of both Tremaine and Knoxville via Instagram. Tremaine was granted an additional three-year restraining order, extended to Tremaine's wife and children, after Margera allegedly sent the family death threats. On August 9, 2021, Margera filed a lawsuit against Tremaine, Knoxville, Jonze, Paramount, MTV, Dickhouse Entertainment, and Gorilla Flicks, alleging that he was wrongfully fired from the production of Jackass Forever.

On January 12, 2022, Knoxville said that, despite the ongoing lawsuit, Margera would still appear in Jackass Forever in one scene he filmed for the movie prior to him being fired. All parties eventually came to a settlement after Margera asked to dismiss the lawsuit on April 14, 2022. The terms of the settlement remain private. Margera eventually appeared in the film in one scene filmed before his termination, as well as being heard in another scene and in archival footage.

Following the settlement, Margera ruled out any future involvements with his former Jackass colleagues or any future Jackass projects, claiming that Knoxville and Tremaine "ruined the legacy" of the franchise. However, he still remains on good terms with the rest of the cast and crew.

On January 8, 2026, Jackass: Best and Last was officially announced by Knoxville, and was released theatrically on June 26, 2026. Due to his experience on Jackass Forever, Margera stated that he will not film any new material for the upcoming film. However, he gave the filmmakers consent to include him through old archive, and unused footage. He was invited to the red carpet premiere of Jackass: Best and Last, but declined the offer due to a prior engagement. Despite this, he still wished for the films' success.

== Filmography ==
=== Film ===
Year	Title	Role	Notes
2000	7-Teen Sips	Auto	Unreleased
2002	Jackass: The Movie	Himself	Writer
2003	Grind	Himself	
2003	Haggard: The Movie	Valo	Writer; Director; Executive producer Editor
2006	The Dudesons Movie	Himself	Guest appearance
2006	Jackass Number Two	Himself	Co-producer; Writer
2007	Jackass 2.5	Himself	Co-producer; Writer
2008	The Fantasstic Whores 4	Himself	Cameo
2009	Minghags: The Movie	Lenny	Writer; Director; Executive producer Editor
2010	Jackass 3D	Himself	Co-producer; Writer
2011	Jackass 3.5	Himself	Co-producer; Writer
2017	Dumb: The Story of Big Brother Magazine	Himself	Documentary
2021	This Is Gwar	Himself	Documentary
2022	Jackass Forever	Himself	Cameo; Writer
2022	Humanity Stoked	Himself	Documentary
2026	Jackass: Best and Last	Himself	Archive footage

=== Television ===
Year	Title	Role	Notes
2000–2001	Jackass	Himself	Starred; 25 episodes
2002	Jackass Backyard BBQ	Himself	TV special
2002	2002 MTV Video Music Awards	Himself	Presenter
2002–2005	MTV Cribs	Himself	2 episodes
2003	Jackass Winterjam	Himself	TV special
2003	2003 MTV Video Music Awards	Himself	Introduced Good Charlotte
2003–2005	Viva La Bam	Himself	Co-creator; Executive producer
2005	2005 MTV Video Music Awards	Himself	Guest appearance
2005	WWE Raw	Himself	Audience member 1 episode
2005–2012	Punk'd	Himself	Host; 2 episodes
2006	2006 MTV Video Music Awards	Himself	Presenter
2006–2009	The Dudesons	Himself	4 episodes
2007	Bam's Unholy Union	Himself	Co-creator; Executive producer
2008	Jackassworld.com: 24 Hour Takeover	Himself	TV special
2008	Bamimation	Himself (voice)	TV short
2009	Steve-O: Demise and Rise	Himself	TV movie documentary
2009	Nitro Circus	Himself	3 episodes
2010	The Dudesons in America	Himself	1 episode
2010	Bam's World Domination	Himself	TV special Co-creator; Director; Executive producer
2010	2010 MTV Video Music Awards	Himself	Presenter
2010	2010 MTV Europe Music Awards	Himself	Presenter
2011	Attack of the Show!	Himself	1 episode
2011	A Tribute to Ryan Dunn	Himself	TV special
2012–2013	Loiter Squad	Himself / Dub Step Dad	3 episodes
2013	Ridiculousness	Himself	1 episode
2014	Access Hollywood	Himself	1 episode
2014	Bam's Bad Ass Game Show	Himself	Co-creator; Executive producer Host
2014	CKY: The Greatest Hits	Himself	TV special
2016	Family Therapy with Dr. Jenn	Himself	2 episodes
2017	Epicly Later'd: Bam Margera	Himself	TV movie documentary
2018	King of the Road	Himself	
2019	Dr. Phil	Himself	1 episode

=== DVDs and videos ===
Year	Title	Role	Notes
1998	Toy Machine: Jump Off a Building	Himself	
1999	Landspeed presents: CKY	Himself	Director; Writer; Executive producer Cinematographer; Editor
2000	CKY2K	Himself	Director; Writer; Cinematographer; Editor
2000	Tony Hawk's Gigantic Skatepark Tour	Himself	
2001	CKY3	Himself	Director; Writer; Executive producer Cinematographer; Editor
2001	CKY Documentary	Himself	
2001	Tony Hawk's Gigantic Skatepark Tour	Himself	
2001	Hook-Ups Presents: Destroying America	Himself	
2002	Adio: One Step Beyond	Himself	
2002	Tony Hawk's Gigantic Skatepark Tour	Himself	
2002	CKY4: The Latest & Greatest	Himself	Director; Writer; Executive producer Cinematographer; Editor
2002	Don't Try This at Home: The Steve-O Video Vol. 2: The Tour	Himself	Guest appearances
2003	Steve-O Out On Bail	Himself	Guest appearances
2004	Tony Hawk's Secret Skatepark Tour	Himself	
2005	Element: Elementality Vol.1	Himself	
2005	Tony Hawk's Secret Skatepark Tour 2	Himself	
2007	Tony Hawk's Secret Skatepark Tour 3	Himself	
2007	3000 Miles	Himself	
2008	Element Bam's or Bust!: The Adventure Begins	Himself	
2008	Bam Margera Presents: Where the ♯$&% Is Santa?	Himself	Writer; Director; Producer; Executive producer
2009	Jackass: The Lost Tapes	Himself	Writer, archived footage
2017	Element: Welcome Back Bam	Himself	
2020	Steve-O: Gnarly	Himself	Guest appearances

=== Music videos ===
Year	Artist	Track	Role	Notes
2000	CKY	"96 Quite Bitter Beings"	Himself	Director
2002	CKY	"Disengage the Simulator"		Director
2002	CKY	"Attached at the Hip"		Director
2002	CKY	"Flesh into Gear"	Himself	Director
2002	Andrew W.K.	"We Want Fun"	Himself	
2003	CKY	"Shock & Terror"		Director
2003	HIM	"Buried Alive by Love"		Director
2003	HIM	"The Sacrament"		Director
2004	HIM	"Solitary Man"		Director
2004	HIM	"And Love Said No"		Director
2004	The 69 Eyes	"Lost Boys"		Director; Executive producer
2004	Clutch	"The Mob Goes Wild"		Director
2005	Bloodhound Gang	"Foxtrot Uniform Charlie Kilo"	Banana Car Driver	
2006	Wolfmother	"Joker & the Thief"	Himself	
2006	Chris Pontius	"Karazy"	Himself	
2009	The 69 Eyes	"Dead and Gone"		Director; Executive producer
2009	CKY	"A♯1 Roller Rager"		Director
2010	The 69 Eyes	"Dead Girls Are Easy"		Director
2010	Weezer	"Memories"	Himself	
2011	CKY	"Afterworld"		Director
2013	Fuckface Unstoppable	"All My Friends Are Dead"		
2014	Fuckface Unstoppable	"Bend My Dick"		Writer and performer
2015	Fuckface Unstoppable	"Moonshine"		Writer and performer
2016	Evesdroppers	"Empty Vessel"		Writer and performer
2016	Evesdroppers	"9 Lives"		Writer and performer
2016	Evesdroppers	"Comin' Home"		Writer and performer
2023	Cult Shotta & Tanboymiguel	"Feel Like Bam"		Writer and performer

=== Video games ===
Year	Title	Role
2001	Tony Hawk's Pro Skater 3	Himself
2002	Tony Hawk's Pro Skater 4	Himself
2003	Tony Hawk's Underground	Himself
2004	Tony Hawk's Underground 2	Himself
2005	Tony Hawk's American Wasteland	Himself
2006	Tony Hawk's Project 8	Himself
2006	Scarface: The World Is Yours	Jay the Liquor Store Owner
2007	Tony Hawk's Proving Ground	Himself
2025	Tony Hawk's Pro Skater 3+4	Himself

=== Web series ===
Year	Title	Role	Notes
2008	Hardly Working	Himself	1 episode: "Jackass"
2015	Jackass Reunion: 15 Years Later	Himself	Rolling Stone special
2018	Bathroom Break Podcast	Himself	Podcast; 1 episode
2020–2023	Steve-O's Wild Ride	Himself	Podcast; 3 episodes
2025	Fishtank	Himself	Day 11–12
2025	BroughtYouThisThing	Himself	Special guest for Tony Hawk's Pro Skater 3 + 4 gameplay
2026	Fishtank	Himself	Host

== Discography ==
With CKY

- Volume 2 (1999)

With Gnarkill

- Gnarkill (2002)
- GnarKill vs. Unkle Matt and the ShitBirdz (2006)

With Fuckface Unstoppable

- Stórfréttir Í Reykjavík (2013)
- Fuckface Unstoppable (2014)

With the Evesdroppers

- The Evesdroppers (2016)

With Cult Shotta, Tanboymiguel and SinceWhen

- Feel Like Bam (2023)

== Books ==
- Bam Margera, Serious as Dog Dirt (MTV; November 17, 2009) ISBN 1-4391-4773-6
