= Tony Hawk's Underground 2 =

2004 video game

- Developer: Neversoft (Note: Ported to Microsoft Windows by Beenox and ported to Game Boy Advance by Vicarious Visions.)
- Publisher: Activision
- Designer: Leonel Zuniga (GBA)
- Writer: Rob Hammersley
- Series: Tony Hawk's
- Platforms: GameCube; PlayStation 2; Xbox; Microsoft Windows; Game Boy Advance; Mobile phone (Java ME and BREW)
- Release: GameCube, PlayStation 2, Xbox: NA: October 4, 2004; PAL: October 8, 2004; Game Boy Advance, Microsoft Windows: NA: October 4, 2004; AU: October 8, 2004 (PC); EU: October 15, 2004; AU: October 22, 2004 (GBA); Mobile: NA: November 10, 2004
- Genre: Sports
- Modes: Single-player, multiplayer

Tony Hawk's Underground 2 is a 2004 skateboarding video game from Activision, the sixth entry in the Tony Hawk's series after Tony Hawk's Underground (2003). It was developed by Neversoft released on October 4, 2004 in the U.S. for the PlayStation 2, Xbox, GameCube, Microsoft Windows, and Game Boy Advance platforms. Mobile phone versions for BREW and J2ME devices was also released, as well as a PlayStation Portable version the following year subtitled Remix, which includes extra levels and characters.

Tony Hawk's Underground 2 received generally positive reviews, with praise for its gameplay, aesthetics and classic mode, but criticism for its story and lack of innovation.

== Gameplay ==
The gameplay in Underground 2 is similar to that of previous Tony Hawk games: the player skates around in a 3D environment modeled after various cities and attempts to complete various goals. Most goals involve skating on or over various objects or performing combos. Scores are calculated by adding the sum of the point value of each trick strung together in a combo and then multiplying by the number of tricks in the combo. New gameplay features include the Focus ability, which the player may trigger with a full Special gauge to cause time to slow down in order to help keep up their combo (by allowing greater control of their grind balance, for example); the Natas Spin, which can be performed on small surfaces like pillars or fire hydrants; and the Freak Out, which serves as another combo starter by having the player fill a gauge after certain bails, which will result in them angrily disposing of their board before continuing their session. In addition, the Wallplant maneuver was repurposed as the Sticker Slap.

Many levels return from previous games, including an expanded Warehouse (which also serves as the Story Mode's training area), School and Downhill Jam from Tony Hawk's Pro Skater, Philadelphia from Pro Skater 2, and Canada, Los Angeles and Airport from Pro Skater 3.

A classic mode was added to Underground 2, which allows players to skate through both the new and remade classic levels in the traditional 10-goal, two-minute time limit mode that was present in Pro Skater, Pro Skater 2 and Pro Skater 3, complete with the stat points scattered all around the levels. In classic mode, the player chooses from one or two levels in which to attempt to complete enough goals to advance. All of the "remade" levels are accessible only through "Classic Mode" although once unlocked, it is possible to play them in any mode except Story.

== Plot ==
The protagonist of the first Underground is skating in their neighborhood hometown of New Jersey when Tony Hawk and Bam Margera kidnap them and take them to a dark room with pro skaters Bob Burnquist, Eric Koston, Rodney Mullen, Mike Vallely, Chad Muska, Wee-Man, Paulie "Wheels of Fury" Ryan (a foul-mouthed kid who wears a body cast and drives a high-powered wheelchair) and Eric Sparrow (the protagonist's former friend-turned-rival from the previous game). Tony and Bam explain their plans for their debut "World Destruction Tour", a worldwide, publicity-free skateboarding tour where two teams (Team Hawk and Team Bam) compete for points; the losing team has to pay for all the expenses. The player joins Team Hawk—Tony, Burnquist, Mullen, Vallely, and Muska—against Team Bam—Bam, Koston, Wee-Man, Paulie, Sparrow, and Phil Margera (team captain and Bam's father).

In Boston, the first leg of the tour, Team Bam manages to win at the last minute, thanks to one of Paulie's stunts. As a result, Bam spins a tennis ball shooter in the center of Tony's team, which hits Burnquist in the genitals, eliminating him. Later on, in Barcelona, Team Hawk manages to take the lead again, but the punishment for Team Bam is to have the player swap teams (in this case, Sparrow moves from Team Bam to Team Hawk and the player doing the opposite), much to Bam's relief and Tony's annoyance. At that time though, word has spread out about the World Destruction Tour, which was supposed to be a low-profile event but now is appearing on TV news because of a video of Bam and Koston letting a bull trash Phil's room.

The player and Sparrow swap back after Berlin. At that moment, an underground film "writer, producer, director" by the name of Nigel Beaverhausen appears, stating he wishes to bring the tour to the public; instead, he winds up being humiliated by Tony and Bam. The skaters then cause chaos in Bangkok after Muska suggests stopping in Thailand en route to the next leg of the tour, Australia. At the end of the leg, as the player is about to be eliminated from the tour, Mullen miraculously spots a mathematical error in Team Hawk's points. The player no longer has to strip down to their underwear and be hit by mousetraps, but will instead have a competition with Sparrow, with the loser being eliminated from the tour.

The group ponders what to do for the competition, when a skater kid arrives and shows them a video of the tour, created by Beaverhausen. Tony decides that whoever humiliates Beaverhausen will stay on the tour. Sparrow manages to steal Nigel's clothes and believes he has won, but the player one-ups him, putting on the clothes and proceeding to rampage through Australia, horrifying citizens and framing Beaverhausen; Sparrow is eliminated as a result.

At the end of the New Orleans leg, Nigel reveals that he has filmed the entire tour up to this point, including the legs before Tony and the crew even met him in Berlin. Nigel proposes that if he is allowed to film the rest of the tour, he will pay for any and all damages incurred; Tony and Bam accept after Phil shows them a massive bill totaling $21,117,551.84 and counting. Team Hawk then performs a death-defying stunt called the "Equalizer" to tie the score with Team Bam, but team members Vallely, Muska, and Mullen are arrested by the cops for stealing the helicopter used for the stunt. This leaves Team Hawk with only the player and Tony to compete against Team Bam in the final leg of the Tour: Skatopia, defined by Tony as "the skateboarding Mecca".

Team Hawk, though reduced to two members, performs well enough to win. However, Bam, confident he was in fact the victor, decides to blow up Skatopia. Tony tries to save the city, and manages to evacuate the skaters and animals, but the player remains stuck in the flaming back end of Skatopia. Bam, seeing an opportunity and considering escape impossible, dares the player to exit the park in a combo, but the player takes the dare and lands the combo to secure the World Destruction Tour win for Team Hawk.

Nigel then begs Bam to give him the tape of the tour. Bam does give him a tape, but it shows Phil in the toilet, shouting to his wife for more toilet paper. The tour then officially ends with Bam and Tony humiliating Nigel once more, as Bam pulls down his pants on international TV. During the credits, it is revealed that Tony and Bam have been officially banned from returning to all locations on the tour (even Thailand). Upon hearing the news, they reply, "Hey, good call".

== Development ==
A sequel to Underground was announced in January 2004. During development, developer Neversoft sent its members to locations featured in-game in order to get more acquainted with the areas.

== Reception ==
Reception

Aggregate scores
Aggregator	Score
GameRankings	84% (PS2/GC); 83% (Xbox); 70% (GBA); 86% (PC)
Metacritic	83/100 (PS2/Xbox); 70/100 (GBA); 82/100 (GC); 85/100 (PC)

Review scores
Publication	Score
1Up.com	A (Xbox/PC); A- (PS2/GC)
Eurogamer	8/10 (PS2)
Game Informer	9.75/10 (PS2/Xbox/GC)
GameRevolution	B+
GameSpot	8.3/10 (PS2/PC); 8.2/10 (Xbox/GC)
IGN	8.6/10 (PS2); 8.4/10 (Xbox); 8.3/10 (GC)

The game received generally positive reviews from critics, with GameRankings scores ranging from 70% to 86% and Metacritic scores from 70% to 85%. It was nominated to be part of the Smithsonian's "The Art of Video Games" display for the PlayStation 2 section under the Action genre, but lost to Shadow of the Colossus. It received runner-up positions in GameSpot's 2004 "Best Alternative Sports Game" and "Best Licensed Music" award categories across all platforms.

The plot received mixed comments. Douglass C. Perry of IGN found the plot to be less "endearing" than Underground's, and while he enjoyed the story mode's gameplay, other staff at IGN did not, opting instead for the Classic mode. A reviewer from GameSpot enjoyed the story mode, but felt it was too short. In contrast, Tom Bramwell from Eurogamer felt there were plenty of levels, and saw the plot as enjoyable and unintrusive, if unintelligent. Ben Silverman of Game Revolution also thought the campaign was noticeably short, but also that "that's actually a blessing, though, because the plot and cut-scenes are pretty lame". Perry enjoyed the level design, but noted some slowdown in the levels due to their size.

Some critics noted that the gameplay had not been significantly upgraded from Underground. Silverman and Perry were unimpressed with the short selection of moves introduced in Underground 2. GameSpot agreed, but concluded that "while not all of these changes are all that great, the core gameplay in THUG2 is still very strong". In contrast, Bramwell felt that the Sticker Slap and additional flip and grab tricks were meaningful, enjoyable additions. The addition of Classic mode was praised by 1UP.com, who considered it superior to the story mode in terms of levels, while adding "the gamers weaned on PS1 Hawks will shed a tear, while newer fans will get a lesson on how things started".

The aesthetics were generally well-received. Perry praised the aesthetics, which he described as more cartoony, especially in the pro skater models, than those of previous Tony Hawk's games. Regarding the sound, he praised both the sound effects and the music. Silverman particularly commended the soundtrack's variety for including songs outside the traditional skating genres of punk, rock, and hip hop (namely Frank Sinatra's "That's Life" and Johnny Cash's "Ring of Fire"). Conversely, Bramwell greatly disliked the soundtrack, although he admitted it suited its purpose of accompanying skateboarding and also found the graphical upgrades to be minor and noted frequent issues with slowdown.

During the 8th Annual Interactive Achievement Awards, the Academy of Interactive Arts & Sciences awarded Tony Hawk's Underground 2 with "Console Action Sports Game of the Year", along with a nomination for "Outstanding Achievement in Soundtrack".

== THUG Pro ==
THUG Pro (Tony Hawk's Underground: Pro) is a community-made mod of Underground 2. The mod's concept is to use Underground 2's game mechanics in every level from every Neversoft game in the Tony Hawk's series for use in single-player and online multiplayer gameplay. The mod is in beta status, under current development, and has been continuously updated since its initial beta release in 2013.
