= Lee Dainton =

Welsh skateboarder and stunt performer (born 1973)

- Born: 22 August 1973 (age 53)
- Other name: Daint
- Education: Abersychan School; West Monmouth School; Pontypool College
- Occupations: Stunt performer, skateboarder, filmmaker
- Years active: 1990-present
- Notable work: Dirty Sanchez
- Height: 185 cm (6 ft 1 in)
- Spouse: Amy Vaughan (m. 2018)
- Children: 2
- Website: www.daintonlee.com

Lee Dainton (born 22 August 1973) is a Welsh stunt performer, skateboarder, and filmmaker best known as the star and co-creator of MTV UK's Dirty Sanchez.

== Career ==
=== Early life ===
Dainton is a native of Pontypool, Wales. He attended Abersychan School and West Monmouth School. He studied carpentry at Pontypool College. He started skateboarding at the age of 12. He first met Mathew Pritchard in Cardiff in 1990. He met Michael "Pancho" Locke by participating in various skateboarding competitions. He met Dan Joyce after he saw him on The Vanessa Show and decided to film with him for a video he was making. He worked as a carpenter with Torfaen council before he left the job and bought a video camera to film the four skateboarding, doing stunts and practical jokes for 18 months. He then made a DVD out of the footage titled Pritchard vs Dainton, which was released in 2001. During, and a little after the first season of Dirty Sanchez, he worked for a skate store.

=== Dirty Sanchez ===
When Dirty Sanchez first aired in 2003, it became clear that Dainton is the one who always messes with his friends, mainly with Pancho and Pritchard. The rivalry between Dainton and Pritchard got worse as the series went on. He is usually the one who performs stunts with piercings, most notably slamming his forehead on a lot of thumbtacks, and performing body suspension. He and Pritchard hosted the first Dirty Sanchez spin-off titled Wrecked in 2007. In 2008, they both starred in another spin-off titled Sanchez Get High.

== Personal life ==
Dainton proposed to his girlfriend Amy in 2017 after 22 years of dating. They got married in 2018 and have two daughters together. He has his own skate store called Kill City.

In series 1 of Dirty Sanchez, it was revealed that Dainton has OCD.

== Filmography ==
=== Film ===
Year	Title	Role	Notes
2001	Pritchard vs Dainton	Himself	Direct-to-video; Director; Producer; Editor
2003	Stupidity	Himself	Documentary; Archive footage
2006	Dirty Sanchez: The Movie	Himself	Writer; Associate producer Second unit director Additional camera operator
2014	Pritchard vs Dainton – The Rise and Falls	Himself	Documentary; Director; Producer; Cinematographer; Editor; Photographer
2019	Mathew vs Pritchard	Himself	Cameo; Short documentary
2025	The Road of Excess	Himself	Documentary

=== Television ===
Year	Title	Role	Notes
2003-2007	Dirty Sanchez	Himself	Co-creator; Writer; 29 episodes
2003	MTV Video Music Awards Latinoamérica 2003	Himself	Presenter
2005	TRL UK	Himself	1 episode
2007	Wrecked	Himself	Co-host
2007	MTV Australia Video Music Awards 2007	Himself	Presenter
2008	Sanchez Get High	Himself	8 episodes
2008	Nike: Put It Where You Want It Tour	Himself	Commercial series
2009	The Noughties... Was That It?	Himself	TV documentary
2010-2016	The Dudesons	Himself	4 episodes Cinematographer (1 episode)
2011	Snog Marry Avoid?	Himself	1 episode
2013	Gumball 3000: Number 13	Himself	TV documentary
2019	Dirty Vegan		Camera operator 1 episode

=== Web series ===
Year	Title	Role	Notes
2020	The Sanchez Story Vol. 1	Himself	Documentary; Podcast; Director; Producer; Editor
2021	The Sanchez Story Vol. 2	Himself	Documentary; Podcast; Director; Producer; Editor
2021	The Lazy Generation	Himself	1 episode Guest appearance
2023	Side Effects of Bullshit	Himself	Host; Podcast

=== Music videos ===
Year	Artist	Track	Role	Notes
2006	Turbonegro	"All My Friends Are Dead"	Himself	
2021	The Hunna	"Bad Place"		Behind-the-scenes cameraman and editor
2022	Chris de Sarandy	"Like I Don't Know You"		Director of photography Cameraman; Editor
2022	Chris de Sarandy	"How To Say Goodbye"		Director of photography Cameraman; Editor
