= Dirty Sanchez (TV series) =

British stunt and prank television series

- Series 1 title card
- Genre: Comedy; Reality television Stunt show Toilet humour Shock humour Physical comedy Slapstick; Pranks
- Created by: Lee Dainton; Mathew Pritchard
- Directed by: Becky Staniforth (series 1); Jim Hickey (series 2-4)
- Starring: Mathew Pritchard; Lee Dainton; Michael "Pancho" Locke; Dan Joyce
- Country of origin: United Kingdom
- Original language: English
- No. of series: 4
- No. of episodes: 29

Production
- Executive producers: Sean Murphy (series 2-4); Becky Staniforth (series 2)
- Producers: Jake Cardew; Becky Staniforth (series 1); Jim Hickey (series 2-4)
- Production locations: United Kingdom; Val-d'Isère, Savoie, France; Phoenix, Arizona, U.S. Oslo, Norway; Sweden; Berlin, Germany; Prague, Czech Republic; Greece; Milan, Lombardy, Italy; Spain
- Cinematography: Martin J. Roach (series 2-4)
- Editors: Michael Green (series 1-3); John Carozzi (series 4)
- Camera setup: Single
- Running time: 22–30 minutes
- Production company: MTV Networks Europe

Original release
- Network: MTV (UK and Ireland)
- Release: 2 July 2003 – 2007

Related
- Dirty Sanchez: The Movie; Wrecked Sanchez Get High

Dirty Sanchez is a British stunt and prank television series featuring a group of three Welshmen and one warped southerner, (as the show describes him) harming themselves, and each other, through dangerous stunts, which ran from 2003 until 2007. It was known as Sanchez Boys and Team Sanchez in the United States. The performers are the Welshmen Mathew Pritchard, Lee Dainton, Michael "Pancho" Locke and the Englishman Dan Joyce and was originally based in Newport, Wales, but later series of the show took place elsewhere in the United Kingdom and the world. Pritchard and Locke also starred as the "Pain Men" in Channel 4's Balls of Steel. The series is similar to the American series Jackass and the Finnish series The Dudesons. The show aired on MTV in the United Kingdom and Ireland, and on MTV2 in the United States.

== Origins ==
Dirty Sanchez consists of three Welshmen named Mathew Pritchard, Lee Dainton, and Michael "Pancho" Locke, and one Englishman Dan Joyce. Pritchard and Dainton became close friends after meeting each other in 1990. Dainton bought a video camera and started filming skate videos with Pritchard. They also participated in various skateboarding competitions where they met Pancho. They met Dan after Dainton saw him on The Vanessa Show. Dainton then drove to Plymouth to film with Dan for a video he was making.

The 4 became close friends and started filming stunts and pranks together for around 18 months. Dainton decided to make a DVD out of it titled Pritchard vs Dainton, which came out on 23 May 2001. It was the most popular skateboarding DVD in the United Kingdom.

After the executives at MTV UK saw the DVD, they wanted to make a TV show out of it. The original plan for the TV show was that Pritchard, Dainton, Pancho, and Dan traveled through the UK to find "the most fucked up people". The Sanchez Boys did not like that idea, but the executives were only interested in the stunts and pranks rather than the skateboarding. The Sanchez Boys then agreed that they would be performing the stunts and pranks themselves. The first series aired in 2003, and became the most popular MTV UK series of all time. It was broadcast in over 64 countries to over 400 million people in total.

== Television series ==
=== Original run ===
==== Series 1: Front End and Rear End (2003) ====
Series one featured eight episodes and focused on each of the Sanchez members. Each episode would have them, friends and family talking about each of the Sanchez members on a certain topic the episode is about, with stunts performed in between each part of the interviews. The last episode had a psychiatrist review each of the Sanchez members behavior throughout the series.

The first series received mixed reactions. Some people called it a lackluster imitation of the American show Jackass; others complained that it pushed the boundaries of taste too far due to the extreme stunts and strong profanity, as well as full-frontal male nudity. The boys are praised by others for their fun-loving hedonism and courage in their dangerous stunts. One review claims "They make Jackass look like the Royal Shakespeare Company", and also on the cover of the Dirty Sanchez: The Movie DVD, there is a similar quote by MAXIM saying "Makes Jackass Look Like The Teletubbies."

==== Series 2: Jobs for the Boyos (2004) ====
The second series also featured eight episodes but focused on the Sanchez members trying out different jobs for one week. The first episode had them working in a hair salon. The second episode had them working on a construction site. The third episode had them train to perform a martial arts show. The fourth episode had them train to be Royal Marines. The fifth episode had them train to be airport fire fighters and the sixth episode had them train to be cowboys. Episodes seven and eight were a Behind the... and Best of... the series. The series became the biggest hit in MTV UK history and is still the only MTV UK series to be broadcast in the United States.

==== Series 3: European Invasion (2005) ====
The third series featured six episodes and focused on the Sanchez members touring six countries to perform six live shows with their tour manager, Johnny B, in Europe. The tour began in Sweden, then to Germany, Czech Republic, Greece, Italy and finished in Spain.

==== Series 4: Behind the Seven Sins (2007) ====
The fourth series featured seven episodes that went behind the scenes of the movie and showed the boys reactions to each sin that they had to perform in each of the countries.

=== Spin-offs ===
==== MTV Wrecked (2007) ====
The first spin-off series, called MTV Wrecked, was hosted by Pritchard and Dainton, which saw them get two contestants to do Dirty Sanchez styled stunts in order to crown a winner. The series would feature eight episodes.

==== Sanchez Get High (2008) ====
The second spin-off series once again only featured Pritchard and Dainton. The series followed them looking for the ultimate 'highs' in Brazil, Mexico, Philippines, Australia, Cambodia, South Africa, India and Japan. They did painful stunts in order to get a 'buzz', they did naked skydiving, had painful tattoos to fit in with Filipino tribes, and tasted old remedies and substances such as ayahuasca and psilocybin mushrooms which are used in some countries to experience an alerted state of consciousness which in high enough dosages can lead to powerful hallucinations and a state of euphoria. This series also had eight episodes.

== Other appearances ==
- MTV Video Music Awards Latinoamérica 2003 (2003) – The boys presented the second annual Latin America MTV Video Music Awards in Miami Beach, Florida, in 2003.
- Balls of Steel (2005–2008) – UK comedy gameshow in which contestants compete for the "Balls of Steel" award. One regular act is "The Pain Men" which consists of Pritchard and Pancho. Each skit is an in-studio display of daily hazards. They appeared in all three series of the show.
- Comedy Lab (2005) – Pritchard and Pancho in an episode of Comedy Lab. They went to Amsterdam, Netherlands, to learn about, and participate in cross-dressing.
- TRL UK (2005) – The boys all appeared in one episode of TRL UK in 2005.
- Death Wish Live (2006) – UK live show in which participants perform live stunts for entertainment. Pritchard and Pancho both appeared in 2 episodes of Death Wish Live.
- Gumball 3000 (2006, 2009, 2011) – Dan Joyce and Pritchard competed in the 2006 event of the Gumball 3000, driving a Japan-Tuning style Nissan 180SX. Pritchard competed in the 2009 event. Pritchard and Dainton also took part in the 2011 event.
- 3000 Miles (2007) – Dan, along with Bam Margera, Ryan Dunn, Tony Hawk, Mike Vallely, and Mike Escamilla race 3000 miles around the world from London to Los Angeles, California, in just 8 days against 120 supercars in the famous Gumball 3000 Rally. 3000 Miles follows action and adventure along the way, with fast driving, crashes and sabotage adding to the drama and mayhem.
- MTV Australia Video Music Awards 2007 (2007) – The boys presented the third annual MTV Australia Awards in the Acer Arena in Sydney in 2007.
- The Man Who Souled The World (2007) – Documentary about Steve Rocco who created the Big Brother skateboarding magazine. Pritchard appears in this documentary.
- Nike's Put It Where You Want It Tour (2008) – A series of online commercials where Dirty Sanchez searched for the footballer with the deadliest accuracy in the world. In order, they visited Wayne Rooney, Torsten Frings, Gennaro Gattuso and Florent Malouda – each of which wore Nike Total 90 shoes/boots. The Sanchez Boys offered each star a chance to prove their skill with a series of shooting accuracy challenges – which, in true Dirty Sanchez style, involved using the Sanchez Boys themselves as the targets. As an example, the very first challenge of the series was called the "Pain of Wayne Challenge" and featured Rooney shooting at Pancho while he was tied between the goalposts and clothed in just a jockstrap, leaving his back and rear exposed.
- Jailbait (2009) – Pritchard appears in this TV special. It features him being locked in an abandoned prison in Melbourne, Australia, while the viewers at home can submit stunts for Pritchard to do.
- Nitro Circus (2009) – Dan appeared as a cameraman in an episode of Nitro Circus featuring Bam Margera, and Brandon Novak.
- The Dudesons (2010, 2014, 2016) – The boys from Finland go to Australia and meet up with The Sanchez boys in third episode of The Dudesons fourth season in 2010. Dainton and Pritchard also appeared in The Dudesons Gumball 3000 Rally episode in 2014. They both also appeared in the third and fifth episodes of the fifth season of The Dudesons in 2016.
- Snog Marry Avoid? (2011) – Pritchard and Dainton appeared in episode 8 of the fourth series of the Make-under series where they were made to look smart. They didn't keep the improved look for long.
- Xperia Hot Shots (2011) – Pritchard and Dainton challenge each other to a game of tennis, only to be challenged by Sorana Cîrstea, and Bethanie Mattek-Sands, who improvise a game of paintball tennis, and aim at Pritchard and Dainton on purpose. The smashes were filmed in super slow motion using a Phantom camera.
- Dirty Vegan (2019–2020) – Pritchard hosted this show. This is the first vegan cookery show on BBC. Dainton was a cameraman for the first episode.
- The Lazy Generation (2021–2022) – Pritchard and Dainton appeared in the second webisode of The Lazy Generation as the two judges of "The Treadmill High Dive". Dan directed the web series of The Lazy Generation on the YouTube channel of Comedy Central UK.

== Dirty Sanchez: Stage Show ==
At the 2004 and 2005 Carling weekend at the Reading and Leeds festivals, the Dirty Sanchez team performed a variety of stunts live onstage at the cabaret tent, including attacking their legs with a meat tenderiser, being dragged across a sandpapered stage on bare buttocks, and smoking a bong filled with their own urine and pubic hair instead of water and marijuana. They also appeared at the Leeds leg of the festival in 2006.

On 1 June 2007, Dirty Sanchez confirmed a full stage show with DJ at Reading Festival 2007. They also performed live in the summer of 2007 every Monday at Bar M in Ibiza.

In 2009, Dirty Sanchez toured Australia with The Dudesons during the Soundwave Festival.

All four of the boys did one final show together in 2010. However, Lee Dainton and Mathew Pritchard continued doing live shows called Pritchard vs Dainton. The last ever Prichard vs Dainton live show was in 2015.

On 12 December 2019, the boys reunited in Tramshed, Cardiff for the first time in over a decade. Instead of doing stunts, the boys showed Dirty Sanchez: The Movie to a live audience followed by a Q&A.

== Dirty Sanchez: The Movie ==
Dirty Sanchez: The Movie
- Theatrical poster
- Directed by: Jim Hickey
- Based on: Dirty Sanchez by: Lee Dainton; Mathew Pritchard
- Produced by: Bobby Allen; Rupert Preston
- Starring: Mathew Pritchard; Lee Dainton; Michael "Pancho" Locke; Dan Joyce
- Narrated by: Howard Marks (warning only)
- Cinematography: Martin J. Roach
- Edited by: James W. Herbert
- Production companies: MTV Europe; Vertigo Films
- Distributed by: Pathé Distribution
- Release date: 22 September 2006 (United Kingdom)
- Running time: 95 minutes
- Country: United Kingdom
- Language: English
- Budget: £1,000,000
- Box office: £1,208,708

Dirty Sanchez: The Movie, a reality comedy film based upon the series, was released on 22 September 2006. It is in the format of a world tour and incorporates stunts related to the seven deadly sins. Stunts are on a larger scale and more extreme than stunts shown in the TV show. The film also features the first cross over battle between two stunt groups. In their tour of Japan, the Dirty Sanchez team battles the Tokyo Shock Boys to see who is more extreme. In the end the Tokyo Shock Boys refuse to do a live show with Dirty Sanchez due to their disgusting antics.

The movie begins with the boys smashing a car through a caravan and they end up "dying" and going to hell, where they meet Satan (played by Howard Marks), who tells them what they need to do to get their lives back.

The most notable stunts include: The boys walking on a grass field while trying to avoid the clay discs that are being fired at them by skeet shooters; Mathew Pritchard attempting to break the world record for most paintball hits to the body; Pancho getting liposuction without any anesthesia and Dan Joyce drinking the fat later; Pritchard having the tip of his little finger chopped off; and Lee Dainton slamming his forehead on drawing pins.

The movie ends with Satan being pleased by the boys' efforts for the seven sins and allows them to live but asks if there is anything else they want to admit. Pritchard admits that he has tricked Pancho by putting Immac on his eyebrows which made them fall out. Pancho becomes enraged and storms out of the set and threatens to kill or injure the film crew. Pancho storms outside and waits for a bus while stating that he feels like a "spaz". It ends with a montage of deleted stunts being played during the credits and Dainton revealing what the "Sleep When You're Dead" tattoo really means, which leaves Pritchard in anger. Some of the deleted stunts are fully shown in series 4.

Filming

Dirty Sanchez: The Movie was filmed entirely in 6 weeks. Filming started in November 2005. During filming, the cast and crew got kicked out of half of the countries they visited because of their antics.

Release

The DVD of Dirty Sanchez: The Movie was released on 22 January 2007 by Pathé's home video distributor 20th Century Fox Home Entertainment.

The movie premiered on television on MTV at 10:30pm on 5 August 2007. Many of the scenes and stunts were cut short or not shown due to censorship reasons. TMF broadcast the movie later that month.

The movie premiered at the 2007 Tribeca Film Festival. Described as Jackass on crack, the film is about "wicked nasty stunts such as liposuction drinking games, beer enema shotguns, things that shouldn't be done with male genitalia, and more...."

Home media

The film was released on DVD in North America on 11 September 2007 by Dimension Extreme and Alliance Atlantis. The film was also released on Blockbuster. When the film was released in the United States on Blockbuster, it made £4,000,000 but Harvey Weinstein bought the film because he didn't want to have any competition with Jackass. "He bought the movie only to hide it", Mathew Pritchard said.

Critical response

Critic Peter Bradshaw of The Guardian gives the film a score of 3 out of 5. He admits the film is not in good taste but describes it as a film "you feel guilty and ashamed for enjoying" and jokes "for sheer self-destructive lunacy they might deserve an award".

On Rotten Tomatoes the film has an approval rating of 40% based on reviews from 5 critics, with an average rating of 4.5/10.

Trivia

The film was shot in chronological order and was only theatrically released in the United Kingdom, it was also released on the exact same date as Jackass Number Two. The boys got kicked out of half of the visited countries because of their mischiefs. Mathew Pritchard reportedly never wanted to meet the Jackass cast. Dan Joyce was originally supposed to receive breast implants on one side of his chest; this was later changed to Pancho getting a liposuction because the healing time for Dan would be too long. The boxing match between Lee Dainton and Pritchard actually went on for 4 rounds, but it was edited to only 1 round just to mess with Pritchard, the full fight is shown in series 4. The original plan was for Pritchard to chop off a whole entire half of his right little finger, until MTV stepped in and prevented this from happening; it was later changed to just the tip.

Unmade sequel

On 4 August 2021 Mathew Pritchard was invited to Matt Stocks' podcast. At the very end of the podcast, Pritchard stated that a sequel to Dirty Sanchez: The Movie was planned and funded, but MTV never let filming happen. "If MTV did let it happen, I was gonna be having "I love Dainton" lasered off my knob, and have "I love Dainton" tattooed on my ringpiece," Pritchard said. This sequel was reportedly planned to be a 3D film after the huge success of Jackass 3D (2010).

== Pritchard and Dainton – The Rise and Falls (2014) ==
Pritchard and Dainton – The Rise and Falls is a 2014 documentary based on the series, directed and produced by Jim Hickey, and Lee Dainton. It details the series' ten-year history, including interviews with the team and never-before seen footage from various episodes. Originally scheduled for release in March 2014, it was in production for roughly six months but was restrained by MTV, who owned the rights to the series' footage. Pritchard and Dainton started a crowdfund on Kickstarter for £10,000 on 5 February 2014 to purchase the rights. Within two days the target was reached.

The documentary premiered in Brynmawr in July 2014, and was released on DVD later that year. It is narrated by Howard Marks, who had a brief appearance in the Dirty Sanchez movie as Satan.

== Mathew vs Pritchard (2019) ==
Mathew vs Pritchard is a short documentary based on Mathew Pritchard's life. This documentary features the story of Pritchard from a daredevil with his own TV show, to a healthy triathlon athlete with his own vegan cooking show. He also tells how Dirty Sanchez started from his perspective, with old and never-before-seen footage playing throughout the documentary. Lee Dainton also makes a brief appearance in this documentary.

== The Sanchez Story (2020–2021) ==
The Sanchez Story is a web series available on the official Dirty Sanchez website. It is hosted by Matt Stocks and has been in the works for four years. It marks the first time in over a decade that all four Sanchez boys have appeared on camera together. The boys, along with Matt Stocks, meet up at Mathew Pritchard's Sleep When You're Dead barber and tattoo shop in Cardiff to discuss the history and behind-the-scenes stories of the Dirty Sanchez TV show, movie and live shows. "We were planning a full Dirty Sanchez reunion tour this year, but COVID-19 had other plans so we bring you this exclusive video series instead," Matt Stocks said. This series has released two volumes so far.

== Untitled second Dirty Sanchez film (2027) ==
A second Dirty Sanchez movie is planned for release in 2027, by Paramount Pictures. All four cast members were set to return. On 18 October 2026, Mathew Pritchard said they had filmed a teaser trailer for the movie.

Cast member Pancho died in November 2026, leaving the status of the planned film uncertain.

== Soundtrack ==
Front and Rear End:

- "Whatever Happened to My Rock n' Roll" – Black Rebel Motorcycle Club

Jobs for the Boyos:

- "First Day" – The Futureheads
- "That's Livin' Alright" – Joe Fagin. From "Auf Wiedersehen, Pet" (Builder)

European Invasion:

- "American Idiot" – Green Day

Dirty Sanchez: the Movie:

- All My Friends Are Dead – Turbonegro
- Hurt Yourself – Amino
- Gravy Digger – Polar Boy
- Get Laid – 4ft. Soldiers
- Breaks – Xander Reid www.myspace.com/xanderreid (Anger)
- HND in RNR – Levelload (Pride)
- Peaches – Dub Pistols (remix) (Pride)

This is the track listing from the Soundtrack CD

- All My Friends Are Dead – Turbonegro
- You Got to Leave – The Bees
- Hurt Yourself – Amino
- Peaches – The Dub Pistols feat. Rodney P. & Terry Hall
- Get Laid – 4 ft Soldiers
- Supergrass – Killa Kela
- Eden Lies – The vapour Trails
- We Play Games – The Aftershow Party
- Gravy Digger – The Tulips
- Kiss It Better – Lol Hammond
- HND in RNR – Levelload
- Thai Porno Theme – Carpetface
- Sweet Lassi Dub – Bhutan Philharmonic

Sanchez Get High – Pritchard 'V' Dainton:

- Seeing Hands – Dengue Fever
