= Dan Joyce =

British stunt performer (born 1976)

- Born: Daniel Buck Joyce; 2 June 1976 (age 50); London, England
- Other name: Joycey
- Occupations: Stunt performer, skateboarder, filmmaker
- Years active: 1992–present
- Known for: Dirty Sanchez
- Height: 180 cm (5 ft 11 in)
- Spouse: Suzie Hogan (m. 2012)
- Children: 1

Daniel Buck Joyce (born 2 June 1976) is a British professional stuntman, skateboarder, filmmaker, and one quarter of the Dirty Sanchez crew. He has also been made a Reverend for a Dirty Sanchez prank on Mathew Pritchard and Michael "Pancho" Locke.

== Dirty Sanchez ==
Joyce's role in Dirty Sanchez is not as practical as the others. He is the only Englishman in the group, making him something of a black sheep when considering the other members' strong Welsh accents. He is well known for his distinctive laugh, something which the other members of Dirty Sanchez have likened to a "machine gun", and is often clad in fake Burberry clothing, mostly in the form of shirts, jackets or boxers.

On the DVD for the first series, a psychologist says that Joyce seems more committed in laughing at and encouraging the rest of the crew's acts than participating, though he does often participate. On some occasions the rest of the crew have mentioned that Joyce cannot take a joke properly, as seen when a man tries to throw him into a tub full of ragworms; Joyce lashes out at him for dirtying his £240 Burberry jacket, but is placated by the others. Joyce denies these claims, and simply says that "If it doesn't seem fun, I'm not going to do it".

== Stunts ==
As opposed to performing some of the more pain-related stunts, Joyce is far more willing than the other Sanchez members to performing acts involving ingestion, which include drinking Pancho's fat from the non-anaesthetic liposuction done as part of the movie, eating the end of Pritchard's little finger after having it chopped off (which he spat out), eating pubic hair on a pizza and (attempting) to drink a glass of sweat collected from the Dirty Sanchez team. He is also well known for stunts that end up involving him eating his own, or other people's, vomit.

== Other appearances ==
He is featured in the Gumball 3000 documentary film 3000 Miles.

He is also featured in a Nitro Circus episode along with Bam Margera where he is seen filming Travis Pastrana and friends doing a base jump from a hotel.

He appears in the song "Check out my Subaroo", in which is he is emceeing. The song is a mockery of "boy racers" and "ricers".

He appears in the video for "Raver" by Shy FX at 1:48 in, he is on a skateboard miming the lyrics to the song. He also appeared at 3:02 staring at the camera whilst sitting on a park bench.

He was the director and photographer the web series titled The Lazy Generation on the YouTube channel of Comedy Central UK.

== Personal life ==
Joyce married his girlfriend Suzie Hogan in June 2012. Their first daughter was born in 2015. In February 2015, Joyce suffered from a heart attack.

== Filmography ==
=== Films ===
Year	Title	Role	Notes
2001	Pritchard vs Dainton	Himself	Direct-to-video release
2006	Dirty Sanchez: The Movie	Himself	Writer; Associate producer
2007	3000 Miles	Himself	Documentary
2014	Pritchard vs Dainton – The Rise and Falls	Himself	Documentary
2025	The Road of Excess	Himself	Documentary

=== Television ===
Year	Title	Role	Notes
1992	Great Performances	Various	1 episode
1999	The Vanessa Show	Himself	1 episode
2003–2007	Dirty Sanchez	Himself	Writer; 29 episodes
2003	MTV Video Music Awards Latinoamérica 2003	Himself	Presenter
2005	TRL UK	Himself	1 episode
2007	MTV Australia Video Music Awards 2007	Himself	Presenter
2008	Nike: Put It Where You Want It	Himself	Commercial series
2009	Nitro Circus	Himself	Episode 1.3; Camera operator
2010	The Dudesons	Himself	Episode 4.3; Cinematographer

=== Web series ===
Year	Title	Role	Notes
2020	The Sanchez Story Vol. 1	Himself	Documentary; Podcast
2021	The Sanchez Story Vol. 2	Himself	Documentary; Podcast
2022	The Lazy Generation	Himself (2 episodes)	Director; Photographer

=== Music videos ===
Year	Artist	Track	Role	Notes
2005	Dirty Dan Joyce	"Check Out My Subarooo!"	Himself	Writer and performer
2006	Turbonegro	"All My Friends Are Dead"	Himself	
2012	Shy FX	"Raver"	Skateboarder	
