= Mathew Pritchard =

Welsh skateboarder and stunt performer (born 1973)

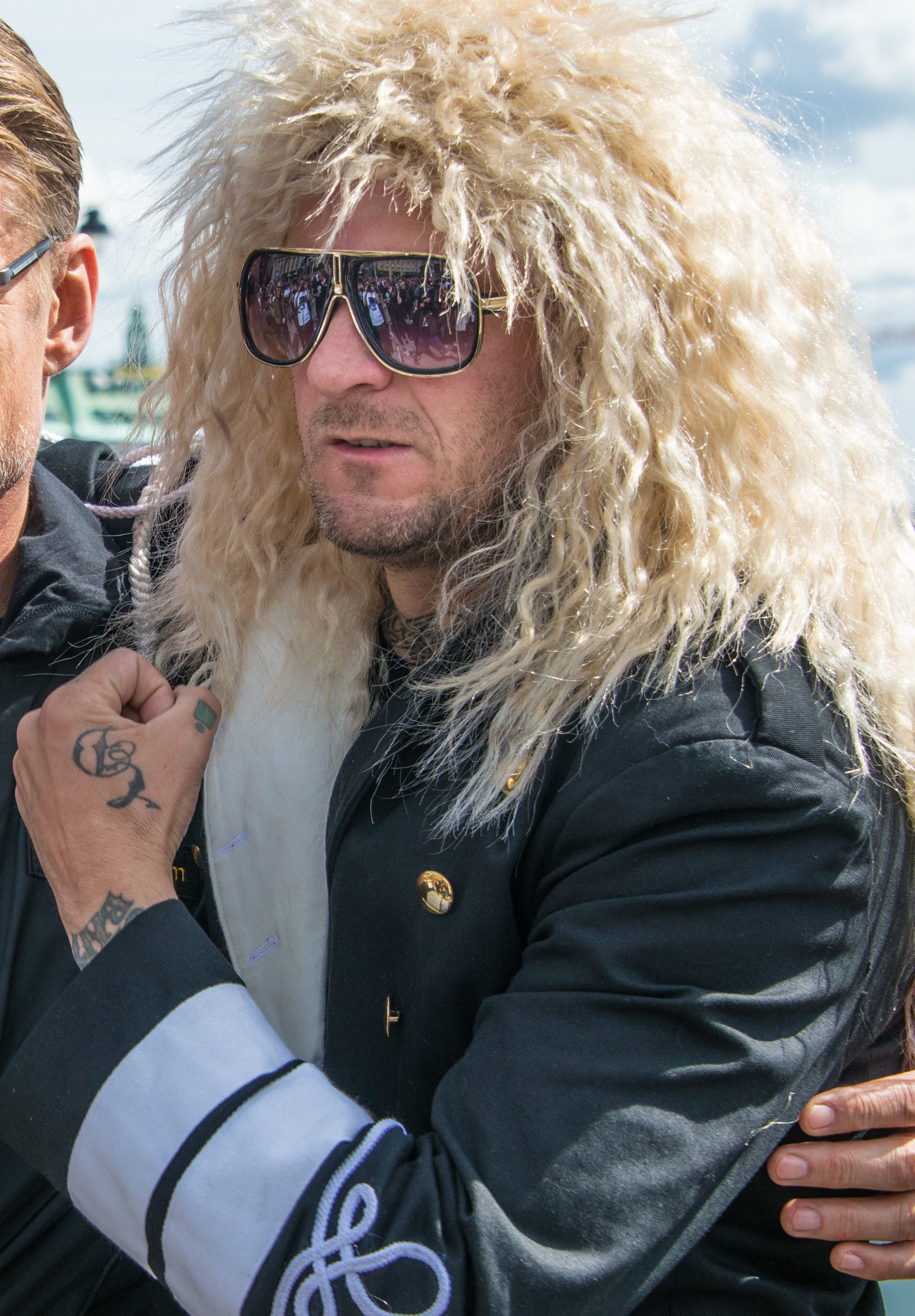
- Pritchard in 2015
- Born: 30 March 1973 (age 53); Cardiff, Wales
- Other names: Matt Pritchard; Pritch; Mr. 50/50
- Occupations: Skateboarder, stunt performer, celebrity chef, triathlon athlete
- Years active: 2001–present
- Known for: Dirty Sanchez
- Height: 182 cm (6 ft 0 in)

Mathew Pritchard (born 30 March 1973) is a Welsh professional skateboarder, stunt performer, celebrity chef, and triathlon athlete. He is best known as the star and co-creator of MTV UK's Dirty Sanchez. In 2019, he hosted the first BBC vegan cookery show, Dirty Vegan. He authored three cookbooks: Dirty Vegan, Dirty Vegan: Another Bite, and Dirty Vegan: Fast and Easy.

== Career ==
=== Early career ===
Pritchard worked for Globe Shoes for six years and later designed his own signature shoe, a Sleep When You're Dead model named after his motto. He began skateboarding at the age of 15. His first sponsor was City Surf skate shop in Cardiff.

=== Dirty Sanchez and Balls of Steel ===
Pritchard filmed the skating video Pritchard vs Dainton, in which Pritchard and Lee Dainton skated against, hit, and pranked each other. This formed the basis of Dirty Sanchez, an MTV stunt programme starring Pritchard, Dainton, Michael "Pancho" Locke, and Dan Joyce. This ran from 2003 to 2008, and in 2006 the four released Dirty Sanchez: The Movie, in which they traveled around the globe doing stunts and pranks that related to the Seven Deadly Sins. Pritchard was also involved in multiple spin-off series. Dainton and Pritchard hosted MTV's 2007 stunt-based game show Wrecked, and Sanchez Get High was a spin-off in which Pritchard and Dainton visited indigenous peoples and took traditional medicines. It aired on MTV in 2008.

Pritchard appeared with Locke as the "Pain Men" in 10 episodes of the Channel 4 game show Balls of Steel, which ran from 2005 to 2008.

=== Dirty Vegan ===
Pritchard became vegan in 2015 after watching Cowspiracy. In 2017, he launched a YouTube-based cookery series called Proper Vegan Cookin'. In 2019, he hosted Dirty Vegan, the BBC's first vegan cookery show. He also produced tie-in cookbooks for the series: Dirty Vegan and Dirty Vegan: Another Bite. His third book, titled Dirty Vegan: Fast and Easy, came out on 7 December 2023.

=== Other works ===
In 2018, BBC Wales filmed a documentary titled Wild Man to Ironman in which Pritchard performs a 14-day ironman challenge in Wales.

== Personal life ==
On 7 September 2009, Pritchard was attacked with a set of keys in a supermarket in Toftwood, Norfolk, suffering serious stab wounds to his neck and chest. His assailant was jailed for five years in 2010, after being found guilty of wounding with intent to cause grievous bodily harm.

Pritchard had a dog named Lemmy, who made frequent appearances on Pritchard's Instagram posts.

== Filmography ==
Pritchard in 2008

=== Films ===
Year	Title	Role	Notes
2001	Pritchard vs Dainton	Himself	Direct-to-video release
2003	Stupidity	Himself	Documentary; Archive footage
2006	Dirty Sanchez: The Movie	Himself	Writer; Associate producer
2007	The Man Who Souled the World	Himself	Documentary
2014	Pritchard vs Dainton – The Rise and Falls	Himself	Documentary
2019	Mathew vs Pritchard	Himself	Short documentary
2025	The Road of Excess	Himself	Documentary

=== Television ===
Year	Title	Role	Notes
2003–2007	Dirty Sanchez	Himself	Co-creator; Writer; 29 episodes
2003	MTV Video Music Awards Latinoamérica 2003	Himself	Presenter
2005–2008	Balls of Steel	Himself	Segment: "Pain Men"
2005	Comedy Lab	Alice	Episode 7.7
2005	TRL UK	Himself	1 episode
2006	Death Wish Live	Himself	2 episodes
2007	Wrecked	Himself	Co-host
2007	MTV Australia Video Music Awards 2007	Himself	Presenter
2008	Sanchez Get High	Himself	8 episodes
2008	Nike: Put It Where You Want It	Himself	Commercial series
2009	Jailbait	Himself	TV special
2009	Gumball 3000	Himself	TV documentary
2009	The Noughties... Was That It?	Himself	TV documentary
2010–2016	The Dudesons	Himself	4 episodes
2011	Snog Marry Avoid?	Himself	Episode 4.8
2012	Rally On	Himself	8 episodes
2012	Gumball 3000: Number 13	Himself	TV documentary
2018	Wild Man to Ironman	Himself	TV documentary
2019–2020	Dirty Vegan	Himself	Host; Co-creator

=== Web series ===
Year	Title	Role	Notes
2015–2019	London Real	Himself	2 episodes
2020	The Sanchez Story Volume 1	Himself	Documentary; Podcast
2021	The Sanchez Story Volume 2	Himself	Documentary; Podcast
2021	The Lazy Generation	Himself	1 episode

=== Music videos ===
Year	Artist	Track	Role	Notes
2006	Turbonegro	"All My Friends Are Dead"	Himself	

== Bibliography ==
- Dirty Vegan (2018)
- Dirty Vegan: Another Bite (2019)
- Dirty Vegan: Fast and Easy (2023)
