= 2007 Gumball 3000 collision =

Motor rally collision in North Macedonia

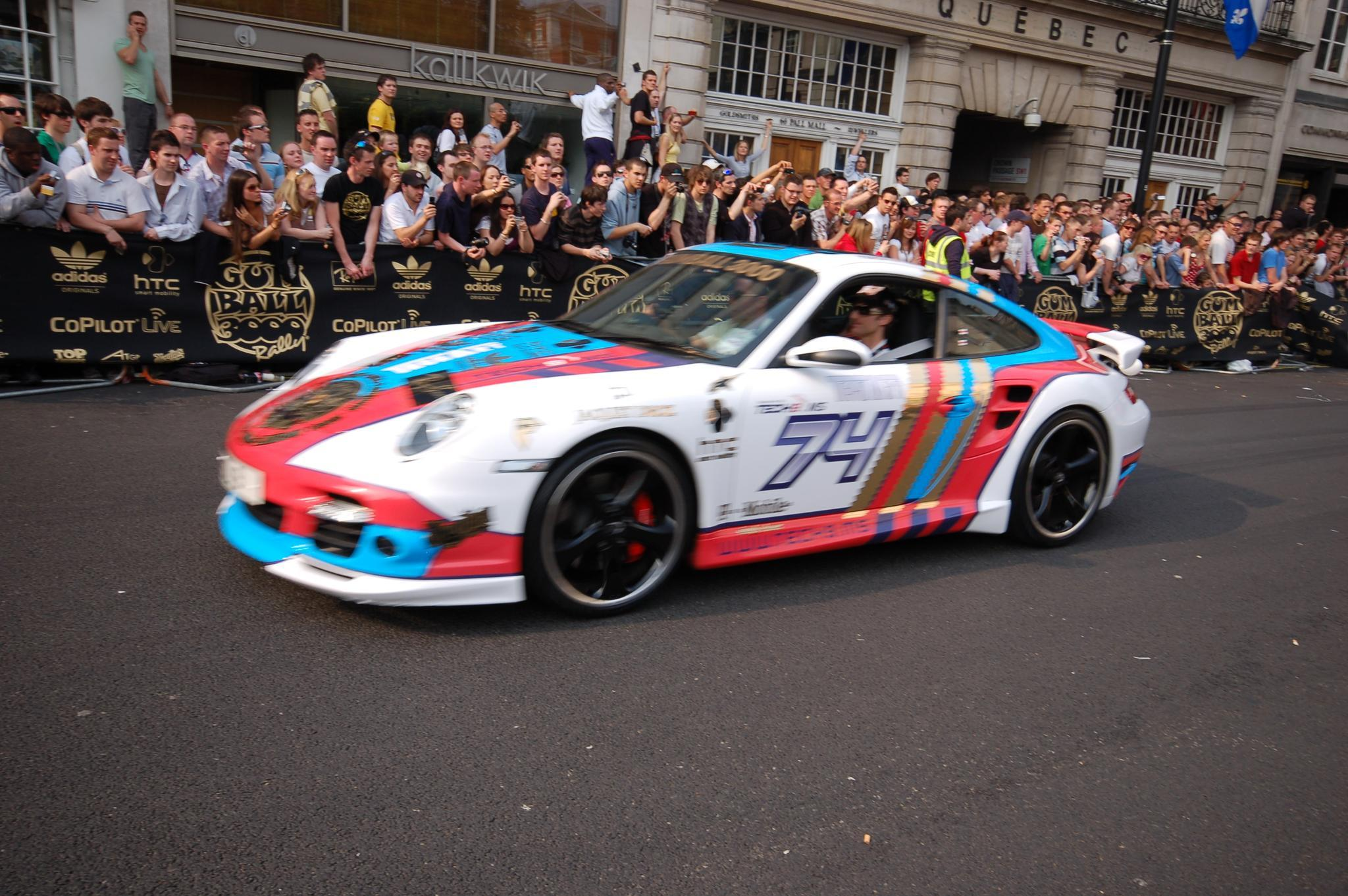
- Nicholas Morley in his TechArt Porsche 997 Turbo leaving London at the start of the Rally.
- Date: May 2, 2007
- Location: 41.174220°N 20.657240°E
- Cause: Road Traffic Collision
- Deaths: 2

The Gumball 3000 Rally of 2007 ended early as the result of a traffic accident on May 2, 2007, in which two people were killed. The accident involved two vehicles, the first being a TechArt Porsche 997 Turbo that was participating in the Gumball 3000, and the second being a Volkswagen Golf. The latter was not involved in the Gumball 3000 event. Vladimir Čepunjoski, the driver of the Volkswagen, died at the scene. The passenger, Margit Čepunjoska died at the hospital two days later as a result of the injuries sustained in the crash. The driver of the Porsche, Nicholas Morley, and co-driver, Matthew McConville, were not seriously injured. Morley was sentenced for the death of the occupants of the other car.

== Gumball 3000 ==
The Gumball 3000 is an annual 3000 mile (4,800 km) international rally which takes place on public roads, which travels around the world. Although set up as a rally with no official timing, or prizes for reaching check points first, during the rally, some participants have been fined for speeding and other traffic offences by the police in countries they passed through, cars have been confiscated and the 2007 rally was canceled after a car participating in the rally was involved in a fatal collision with a non-participating vehicle. Although the organizers are careful to emphasize that it is a rally and not a race, it is sometimes referred to as a streetrace.

== The collision ==
On May 2, the participants in the 2007 Rally were driving through the Republic of Macedonia on a route from the Macedonian-Greek border near Bitola to the border with Albania, near the town of Struga. The traffic accident occurred on the motorway M4, at the entrance of the town of Struga, about 10 kilometers (6 mi) from the Macedonian-Albanian border post.

The Porsche hit an oncoming Volkswagen Golf, which was making a left turn on to the main road from a side road and driving in the opposite direction of the Porsche. The Porsche hit the Golf head-on, and the crash pushed both vehicles off the road.

Both the driver and the passenger in the Golf were heavily injured. The driver and the passenger of the Porsche seemed virtually unharmed, and they were immediately picked up by another Gumball 3000 participating vehicle, a BMW M6, and reported to a nearby police station where a breath test showed no alcohol was involved. They were arrested by the Macedonian police for endangering traffic. The casualties reported in the accident were the 67-year-old driver of the Golf, Vladimir Čepunjoski, who died on his way to the hospital, and his wife Margit Čepunjoska, who died in hospital from injuries sustained in the crash on May 4.

Nicholas Morley was set free on bail of £17,000 and handed his passport to return home. He was requested to return to Macedonia if a court called him to attend in the future; however during that time the second fatality was confirmed by the hospital and so he was arrested again the next day in Skopje, while boarding a private jet. After this second arrest, he was detained in custody until the trial.

== The trial ==
In court the prosecution alleged a speed of 161 km/h (100 mph) while the defense opposed this by saying that the speed of the incoming vehicle was not taken into account and that his driving speed was only 70–75 km/h.

After the conviction verdict, Nicholas Morley released a statement detailing its own expert's findings, which contradict those of the prosecution's expert. The statement also claims that the defence were denied the opportunity to present their expert's findings, which could contravene article 6 of the European convention on human rights, the right to a fair trial.

Nick Morley spent 40 days in a Macedonian prison, was convicted, received a two-year suspended sentence, and returned to England.

== Aftermath ==
The organisers of the Gumball 3000 initially continued the rally despite the incident, in a later official statement the organisers stated that the clear details of the incident and confirmation of a fatality did not occur until some hours after the briefing, at which point the decision to cancel the remainder of the rally was made. Adidas, a sponsor to the 2007 Gumball 3000, immediately backed out as a rally sponsor and took all Gumball 3000 related merchandise off the market internationally.
