= Rental Car Rally =

American road race

The Rental Car Rally is a 36-hour city-to-city road rally that takes place on public roads several times a year in different cities, with a different route each time. RCR sees an annual entry of about 30 cars per rally, with each team required to compete in a themed costume of their choosing, so long as the costume includes their vehicle. The rally is not a serious race in the traditional sense of competitive rally driving, though teams win by merit of their costumes and low mileage. Organizers emphasize that Rental Car Rally is a road trip and not a race.

== History ==
Franz Aliquo and Steve Bryant created the Rental Car Rally series in 2008. Drawing inspiration from the Cannonball Run films, Smokey and the Bandit, the Wacky Races cartoons as well as the Gumball 3000, the Rental Car Rally was born as a more reasonable alternative to for those wanting to participate in a rally but who may not have the time and money required to complete in events such as the Bullrun and the Gumball 3000.

The first Rental Car Rally took place on August 15–17, 2008. The route required that participants drive from New York to Montreal, attend a party and drive back to NYC. In 2010, the event launched in Los Angeles. Teams have traveled from LA to Tombstone, Las Vegas, Lake Tahoe, the Grand Canyon, and Death Valley.

== Rally ==
=== 2008 NYC to Montreal ===
The inaugural rally featured 74 cars and 189 participants, and traveled from Long Island City, Queens to Montreal, Canada. Drivers were required to stop at 5 checkpoints along the route (which necessitated that mostly local roads were used) and collect evidence of their passing through them. 3 cars never made it to Montreal due to mechanical problems and 1 team - Jake's Clown Car - did not make it back from Montreal due to an accident in which no one was injured. The winner drove a van converted to resemble an emergency blood delivery vehicle.
