= Michael Locke (stuntman) =

Welsh stuntman and skateboarder (1979–2026)

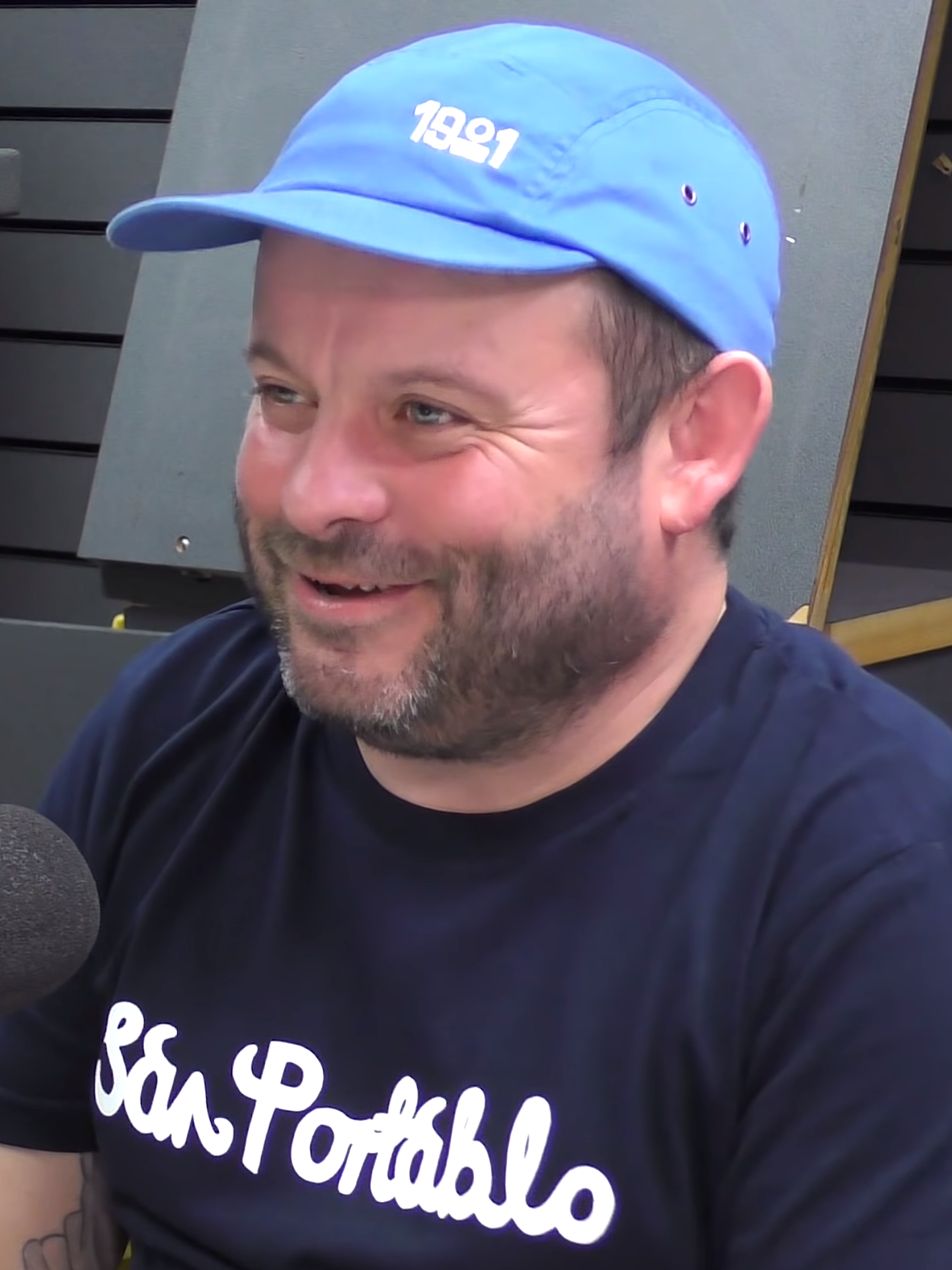
- Locke in 2021
- Born: Michael Richard Locke; 13 March 1979; Neath, Wales
- Died: 5 November 2026 (aged 47); Port Talbot, Wales
- Other name: Pancho
- Occupations: Actor; stuntman; skateboarder
- Years active: 2001–2026
- Known for: Dirty Sanchez
- Height: 163 cm (5 ft 4 in)
- Children: 2

Michael Richard Locke (13 March 1979 – 5 November 2026), better known as Pancho, was a Welsh professional stuntman and skateboarder. He was best known for MTV UK's Dirty Sanchez (2003–2007).

== Life and career ==
Locke was born on 13 March 1979, and grew up in Port Talbot, where he co-founded a tee-shirt shop called San Portablo. He starred in the film Dirty Sanchez: The Movie, released in 2006. He also appeared in the Channel 4 series Balls of Steel as one half of the "Pain Men", alongside Sanchez crew member Mathew Pritchard. They both also appeared in two episodes of Death Wish Live in 2006.

Michael Locke died on 5 November 2026 aged 47.

== Filmography ==
=== Films ===
Year	Title	Role	Notes
2001	Pritchard vs Dainton	Himself	Direct-to-video
2006	Dirty Sanchez: The Movie	Himself	Writer; Associate producer
2014	Pritchard vs Dainton – The Rise and Falls	Himself	Documentary; Archive footage
2025	The Road of Excess	Himself	Documentary

=== Television ===
Year	Title	Role	Notes
2003–2007	Dirty Sanchez	Himself	Writer; 29 episodes
2003	MTV Video Music Awards Latinoamérica 2003	Himself	Presenter
2005	Comedy Lab	Maria	Episode 7.7
2005–2008	Balls of Steel	Himself	Segment: "Pain Men"
2005	TRL UK	Himself	1 episode
2006	Death Wish Live	Himself	2 episodes
2006	Celebrity Sex Tape Unwound	Himself	TV movie documentary
2007	MTV Australia Video Music Awards 2007	Himself	Presenter
2008	Nike: Put It Where You Want It	Himself	TV commercial series
2010	The Dudesons	Himself	Episode 4.3

=== Web series ===
Year	Title	Role	Notes
2020	The Sanchez Story Volume 1	Himself	Documentary; Podcast
2021	The Sanchez Story Volume 2	Himself	Documentary; Podcast

=== Music videos ===
Year	Artist	Track	Role	Notes
2006	Turbonegro	"All My Friends Are Dead"	Himself	Archive footage
