= Pyro Boy =

American stuntman

Pyro Boy (born Wally Glenn) is an American stuntman, best known for strapping fireworks all over his body and blowing them up on stage.

Glenn lives in Emeryville, California. His work has been featured in numerous newspapers and publications such as Life Magazine, and in television shows such as Ripley's Believe it or Not!, several specials on Discovery Channel, BBC, Channel 4, and on PBS's Nova: "Fireworks!"

"I call my act Pyro Boy," Glenn told the Financial Times in 2003. "When I'm doing it, it's really loud and it gives you a real sense of heightened awareness. It really feels like time is slowing down. It gets really, really hot because all the pyro is burning around you at a very hot temperature and the suit itself doesn't breathe."

In 2006 he was featured on Death Wish Live, a Channel 4 limited series filmed in the UK. In it he "teased the Grim Reaper," according to The Times, and became "a human firework."

In 2013, Pyro Boy was featured in the music video of the modern rock band London Grammar with their release of Strong.
