= Alex Zane =

English comedian

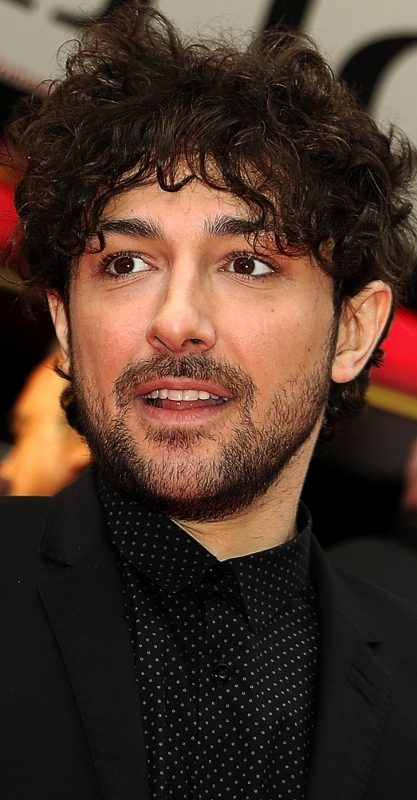
- Alex Zane at The Other Woman London premiere in April 2014
- Born: Faris Alexander L. Albayaty; Leeds, England, UK
- Occupations: Radio and television presenter
- Years active: 2000–present
- Spouse: Nettie Wakefield (2022)

Alex Zane (born Faris Alexander L. Albayaty) is an English television presenter and DJ.

== Early and personal life ==
Zane was born in Leeds and attended Boston Spa School before going on to study Medicine at University College London, a course which he left after a year, and then Media and Communications at Goldsmiths College. His father is an academic based in Trinidad and his mother a charity worker from Leeds, though a March 2014 interview with the Evening Standard reports that "Wikipedia has Zane's real name as Faris Alexander L Albayaty but when I email asking him to clarify this and some other family details his responses are prompt, polite and discreetly uninformative". He bought a house in Highgate in 2005, having previously rented in the area. In June 2018, it was reported that he was engaged to Nettie Wakefield following a "whirlwind year-long romance". They separated in 2022 following a five month marriage.

== Stand-up comedy and radio ==
Zane began his career at the age of 18 when he became a finalist on an open-mic competition called So You Think You're Funny. He moved to London to concentrate on his career, and before leaving medical school, he presented "The Alex Zane Show" on UCL's student radio station Rare FM. He also presented on Wired FM, which led to his own show on London alternative/Indie station Xfm. His radio show was heard by MTV producers, who subsequently signed him up to present shows such as Screenplay and TRL. From April 2007 to April 2009 he presented the weekday breakfast show on Xfm. Zane left Xfm in April 2009, with the station stating that his sudden departure was by "mutual agreement" following a disagreement over a controversial self-created song by Zane.

In April 2010 it was announced Alex would jointly present a Friday evening radio show on NME Radio with the creator of the indie club night Propaganda, DJ Dan. The Show launched 30 April and has a 6pm-8pm time slot. The show is presented live and blends Alex and DJ Dan's taste in music with the NME Radio playlist. In 2010 Alex performed at the Edinburgh Festival with his stand-up show 'Just One More Thing...'.

== Television presenting ==
In 2006 Zane was signed by Channel 4 under an exclusive contract. He co-presented Popworld and the accompanying Popworld Radio podcast with Alexa Chung until the programme ended in July 2007. He has narrated an E4 television show, Princess Nikki, and made appearances on Channel 4 entertainment programmes such as The Law of the Playground, 8 out of 10 cats and Balls of Steel. He presented E4's coverage of Channel 4's hoax reality show Space Cadets, as well as Death Wish Live, the BT Digital Music Awards in 2005 and 2006 and Carling Live 24. He has also presented television coverage of several large scale music events, including the V Festival, and the Wireless Festival in London's Hyde Park and more recently Orange Unsigned Act. He presented Celebrity Scissorhands first on BBC Three, then on BBC One, as part of the BBC's Children in Need charity campaign in November 2006. He has presented Channel 4's variety show based on YouTube videos, Rude Tube, four times (February 2008, January 2009, January 2010 and October to November 2010). He co-presented the Kerrang! music awards 2008 with Cristina Scabbia of Lacuna Coil. He has done promotional presenting work with BBC Blast including a piece on what creativity means.

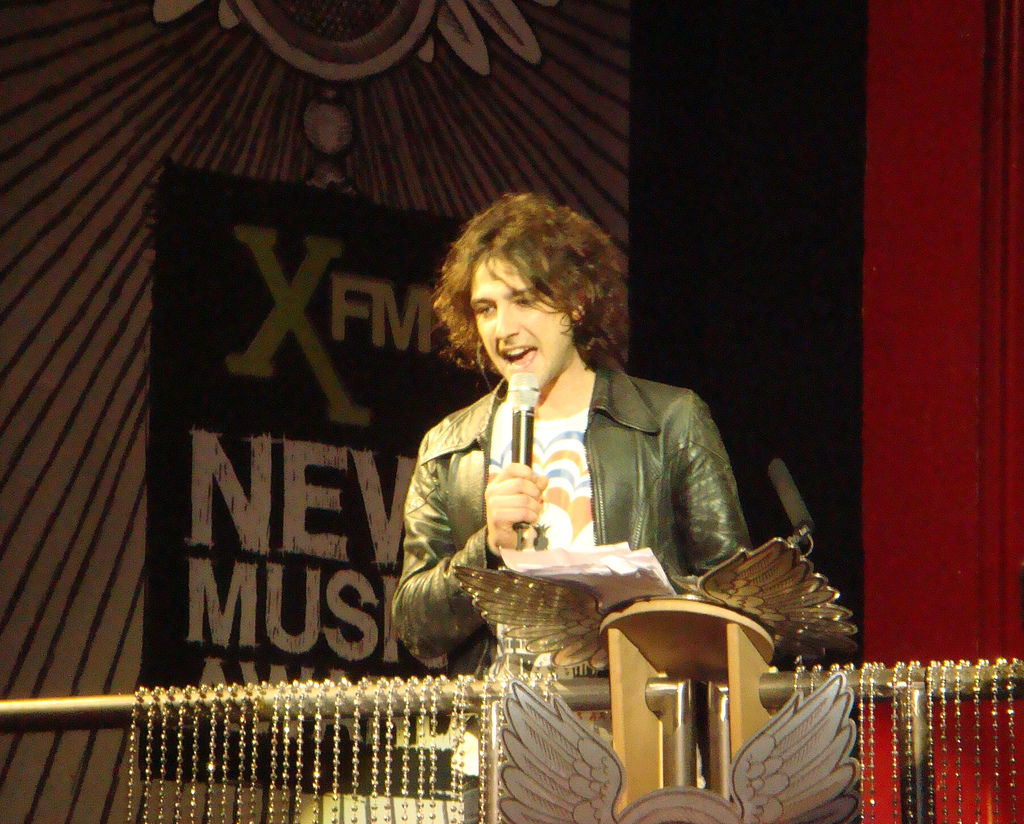
Zane at the Xfm Music Awards 2008

He had small acting roles in Deuce Bigalow: European Gigolo (2005), Dawn of the Dead, Land of the Dead and The League of Gentlemen's Apocalypse.

In July 2009, he co-hosted Harry Potter and the Half Blood Prince: A T4 Special with Rick Edwards and hosted the Channel 4 coverage of Inglourious Basterds.

Between 2008 and 2011 Zane hosted a film show, Alex Zane's Guest List, on Sky Movies Premiere.

In early 2010 he appeared with Bill Bailey as a team captain on birdwatching show Bill Bailey's Birdwatching Bonanza for Sky 1. He is the leading face of Sky Cinema.

== Writing ==
Zane has written comedy material for The Eleven O'Clock Show (Channel 4), Smack the Pony (Channel 4), Brain Candy (BBC Three), and The Sketch Show (ITV1). He also presents some shows on Kerrang! TV. He has been the film reviewer for The Sun newspaper since November 2009.

== Podcasting ==
In 2019, he began presenting movie podcast Clash of the Titles, along with Chris Tilly and Vicky Crompton.
