= TechArt 997 Turbo =

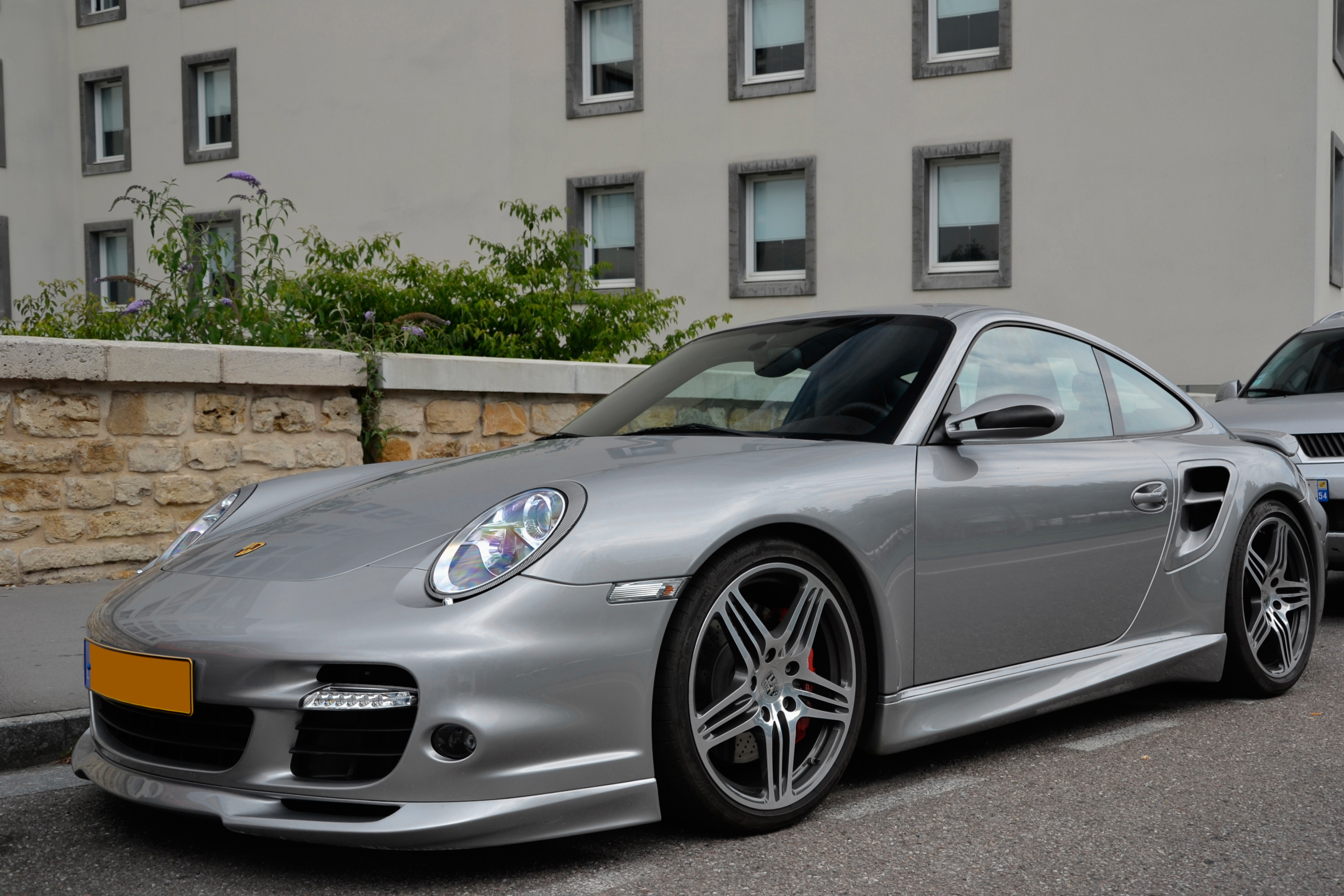

Overview
- Manufacturer: TechArt
- Production: 2007–2011

Body and chassis
- Class: sports car (S)
- Body style: 2-door coupé
- Layout: Rear-engine, rear-wheel drive
- Related: Porsche 997; Porsche 911 Turbo

Powertrain
- Engine: 3.6 L (219.7 cu in) twin-turbocharged flat-6
- Transmission: 6-speed manual

Dimensions
- Curb weight: 3,510 pounds (1,592 kg)

Chronology
- Predecessor: TechArt 996 Turbo

The TechArt 997 Turbo, also known as simply the TechArt Turbo, is a high-performance sports car based on the Porsche 997 Turbo. TechArt has modified the car extensively, fitting it with a body kit, interior modifications, and significant engine tuning.

== Design and Features ==
To the stock Porsche 997 Turbo, TechArt has added a body kit featuring new front and rear spoilers, carbon fibre grille, headlight covers, and side skirts. The car is fitted with TechArt's own 20" wheels, with Michelin Pilot tires to improve handling. The interior is trimmed out with carbon fiber and custom upholstery as well. The most significant modification to the car is under the engine lid. TechArt has modified the stock 3.6 litres (219.7 cu in) flat-6 with larger turbochargers, improved engine control unit chip, and stainless steel exhaust system. With these modifications, the engine develops 600 hp (447 kW; 608 PS) at 6400 rpm and 609 lb⋅ft (826 N⋅m) of torque at 3700 rpm, allowing for a top speed of 210 mph (338 km/h). Customers pay for the base 997 Turbo, which costs US$122,900, then add the desired modifications; the bodykit costs US$11,000, while the engine upgrades are US$29,500. The full package retails for about US$186,000.

== Specifications ==
- Weight: 3,510 lb (1,592 kg)
- Power: 600 hp (447 kW; 608 PS) at 6400 rpm
- Torque: 609 lb⋅ft (826 N⋅m) at 3700 rpm
- Specific output: approx. 166.7 hp (124 kW) per litre
- Weight-to-power ratio: approx. 5.85 pounds (2.65 kg) per horsepower
  - 0-60 mph (97 km/h): 3.4 sec
  - 0-100 mph (161 km/h): 7.4 sec
  - Quarter mile: 11.5 sec at 126.2 mph (203.1 km/h)
  - Top Speed: 210 mph (338.0 km/h)
  - Braking, 60 mph (97 km/h)-0: 113 feet (34 m)
  - Braking, 80 mph (129 km/h)-0: 202 feet (62 m)
  - Lateral acceleration: .94g
