= Death Wish Live =

British live television series

Death Wish Live is a week of live shows from Channel 4 showcasing stunts for entertainment. The five nights each featured a particular artiste; Jonathan Goodwin, The Pain Men, Zamora The Torture King, Pyro Boy & The Cirque de Flambe. Alex Zane was the show's television presenter, while John Beyer was the director. Anthony Owen and Objective Media Group produced the show.

Jonathan Goodwin opened the series with a hangman stunt where he was to escape cuffs before a water filled barrel pulled the noose upwards, lifting him smoothly off his feet rather than the traditional trapdoor method, in a stunt called Cheating the Gallows. The stunt went wrong when he failed to pick the lock and was seen kicking his legs before passing out and being dropped, unconscious, into cardboard boxes at which point the show went to intermission. Producers later explained that the stunt had pre-arranged safety measures, meaning Goodwin's life was never in danger. During the incident, the show was briefly paused, and the screen said, "Death Wish Live! will be back shortly". After the broadcast began again, viewers saw paramedics on scene and subsequently Goodwin making a thumbs up sign. Mediawatch-UK said the stunt was "sick and irresponsible". Seven viewers filed complaints with Ofcom, which opened a probe into the incident.

In a segment named Animal Attack, rats would bite The Pain Men who would lower their heads into containers filled with jellyfish. The Times summarised the show, "Other extreme acts this week include 'animal attack' (tomorrow), featuring rats and jellyfish; a man on a bed of nails being run over by a truck (Wednesday); 'the human torch' (Thursday); and an escape from a buried coffin (Friday)."

== Reception ==
The Birmingham Mail said, "while Jonathan's family may think his stunts are no substitute for a glass of wine and a finger buffet, viewers will be gripped by this programme". Gabrielle Starkey of The Times criticised the show, writing, "So far, E4's Death Wish week has failed to live up to its name, despite some pretty hair-raising stunts."
