= TRL UK =

MTV show

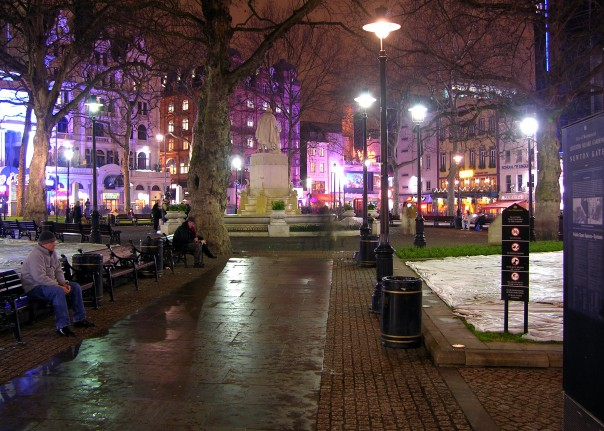
- Leicester Square at night in 2005, where TRL UK was broadcast from
- Starring: Dave Berry; Alex Zane; Eimear O’Donoghue; Maxine Akhtar; Emma Griffiths
- Country of origin: United Kingdom

Production
- Running time: 60 minutes

Original release
- Network: MTV UK
- Release: 19 August 2003 – December 2005

TRL UK was a British version of the popular American show Total Request Live which first aired in the states in 1998, however it was not brought to the United Kingdom until the last quarter of 2003.

It was broadcast weekdays at 4.30pm originally in 2003, but the time slot was changed as it ran into its second season it was then broadcast at 6.00pm in 2005.

The show follows the format of the original Total Request Live it shows a Top 10 Countdown with Musical Guests and Actors and Actresses.

It was broadcast from London's Leicester Square from the UK's capital and the presenters would stand in front of glass windows facing down onto the street to the audience just like the U.S. version.

== Presenters ==
- Dave Berry (2003–2005)
- Maxine Akhtar (2005)
- Jo Good (2005)
- Emma Griffiths (2003–2005)
- Alex Zane (2005)
- Joby Harte (warm-up) (2004–2005)

== Cancellation ==
Originally touted as "Quite simply the biggest show we have ever launched at MTV UK," TRL didn't have the same impact as the USA's version did. The USA's version kickstarted the careers of Britney Spears and Eminem, but TRL did not do this for UK-based acts.

Low ratings led to the show's cancellation in December 2005 and Dave Berry went on to work as a presenter for CD:UK.
