= Gumball 3000 =

English international motor rally

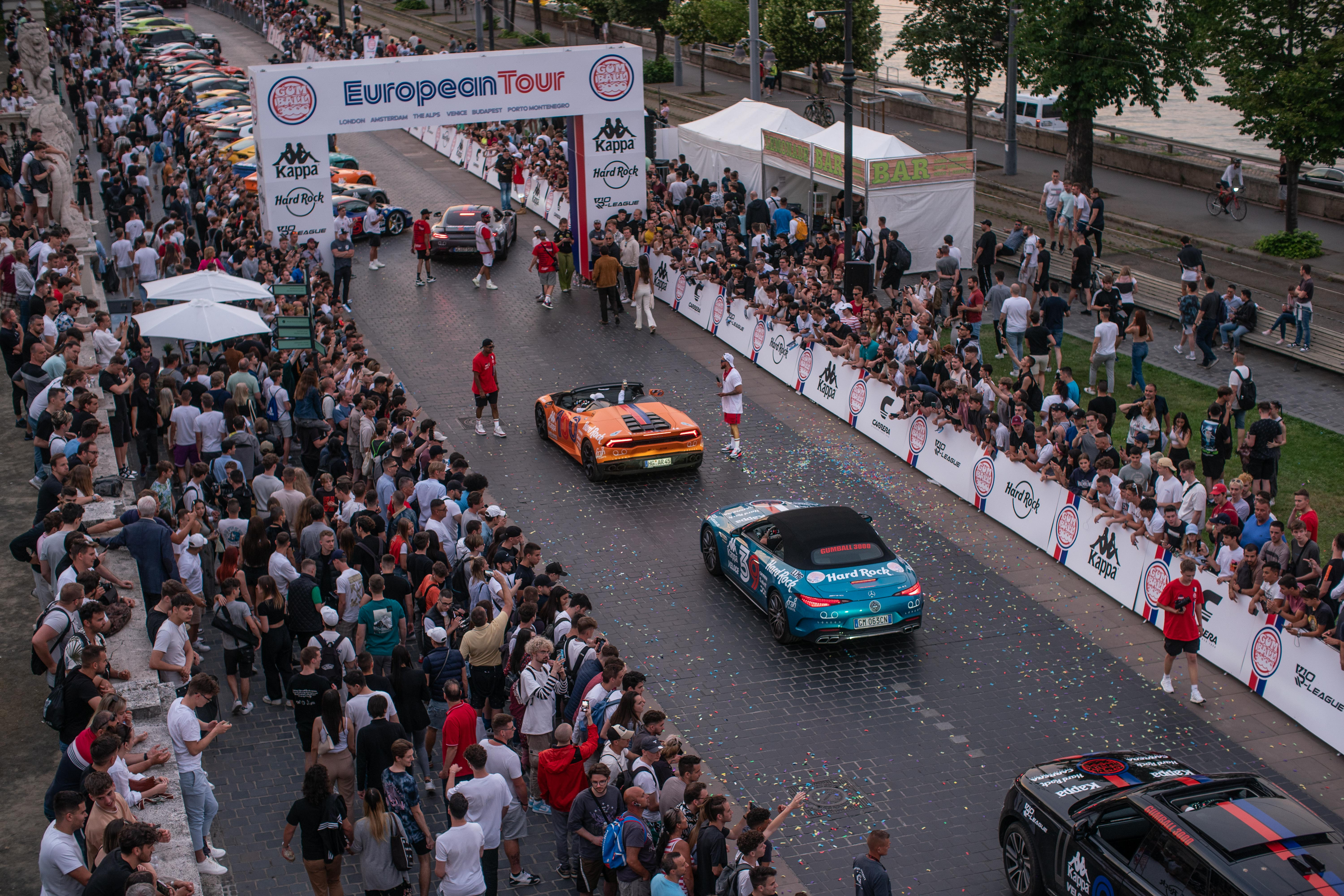
- The Gumball 3000 Rally in Budapest, 2023
- Country: Various
- Years active: (1999–present)
- Inaugurated: 1999
- Founder: Maximillion Cooper
- Previous event: Miami to Mexico City (June 2026)
- Next event: Seoul to Tokyo (October 2027)
- Participants: 120
- Major events: Motor rally
- Website: Gumball3000.com

Gumball 3000 is a brand known for the annual Gumball 3000 Rally, an international celebrity motor rally that takes place on public roads. The brand was founded in 1999 by English entrepreneur Maximillion Cooper, with his vision to combine cars, music, fashion and popular culture.

== Rally format ==
The Gumball 3000 Rally takes approximately 120 vehicles across multiple countries on a 3,000 miles (4,800 km) journey that takes place across 6 days – occasionally including continental travel via cargo planes to transport vehicles by air. Entrants travel on public roads and use a mixture of vehicles ranging from custom classic cars to hypercars, and attend a VIP party, dinner or event each night. The rally features a number of exclusive experiences along the route that includes lunchtime checkpoints and overnight stops in major cities, where major public roads are often closed down to traffic for access of participating vehicles. The rally was founded in 1999 by Maximillion Cooper, initially as a road trip with his friends. Organisers emphasise that the event is a road trip and in no way a race or competition, with their rally slogan reading "It's a rally, not a race".

Rally participants pay for their entry. The entry fee is not disclosed, only being revealed to successful prospective participants in the event.

Rally participants are split evenly each year between new and previous participants (referred to as 'alumni'). Rally participants are referred to as 'Gumballers'.

== Rally history ==
=== 1999–2004 ===
The Gumball 3000 was first launched in 1999. Maximillion Cooper started the event after he and a group of friends aimed to drive their supercars across Europe on a 3,000 miles (4,800 km) journey that they referred to as a rally. The rally was aimed at friends of Cooper, with an initial entry fee of $8,700. Participants had to use their own vehicles.

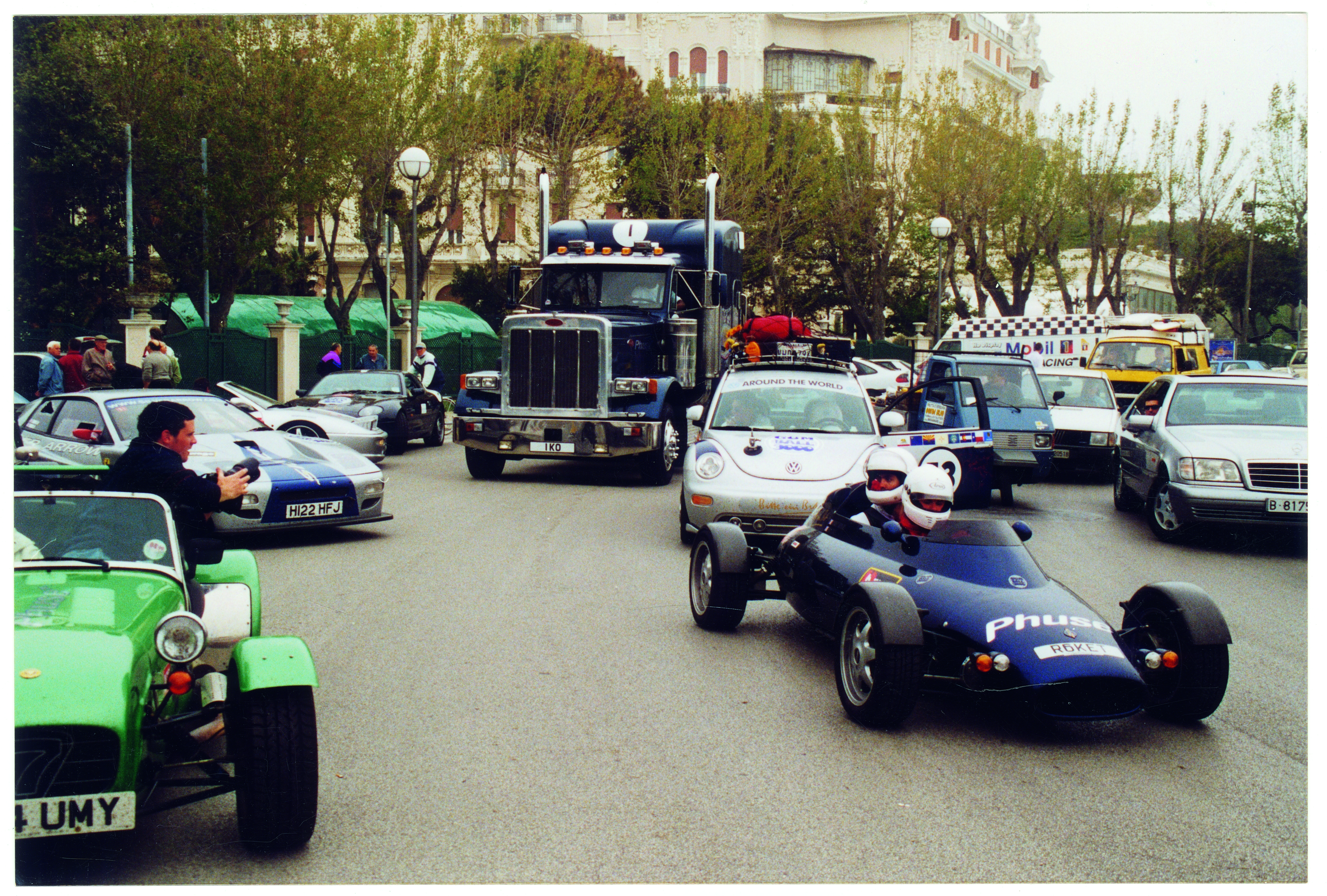
The first Gumball 3000 rally, 1999.

The first event took inspiration from a number of racing events throughout the world. In 1933, motorcycle racer, Erwin Baker, had crossed the United States coast-to-coast in 54 hours. He earned the nickname "Cannonball" which spawned a number of race events in both the United States and Europe over the next few decades in his honor. The Cannonball events were held in the 1970s, with the first prize being a gumball machine. It has been suggested that this is the origin of the Gumball 3000 brand name.

The first event took place in 1999, with the journey starting in London and heading to Rimini, Italy before returning to London. Cooper planned different events on each night of the rally, ranging from parties to dinner events. The rally received extensive coverage in the British media due to the attendance of a number of high-profile figures including Kate Moss, Guy Ritchie and Kylie and Dannii Minogue.

Following the success of the first Gumball 3000 rally, the second event in 2000 began at the Marble Arch in London, before heading to Stansted airport to fly over to Spain. The rally then continued through Bilbao, Cannes, Milan, Hotel Bühlerhöhe Castle, Nürburgring GP circuit and Hamburg, before heading back to the starting city, London.

The cars that participated in the rally were filmed by MTV for a Jackass Special, with the episode earning MTV their highest ratings for the year. Entrants who featured in the 2001 rally included Formula One World Champion Damon Hill in a Lamborghini and comedian Vic Reeves who drove a Mercedes-AMG. In 2002, the Gumball 3000 made the first coast-to-coast journey across the contiguous United States, from New York City to Los Angeles. Checkpoints along the route included a stop at the White House in Washington, D.C.; Graceland in Memphis, Tennessee; Texas; Santa Ana Pueblo, New Mexico; the Grand Canyon; Las Vegas; and, finally, the Playboy Mansion in Los Angeles. Among the participants were fashion designer Donna Karan, models Jodie Kidd and Amy Wesson, and actor Matthew McConaughey.

In 2003, Gumball 3000: The Movie was released. It was a 98-minute 2003 film feature directed by Steven Green and narrated by the late Burt Reynolds.

The fifth Annual Gumball 3000 rally began in San Francisco on the west coast of America and finished Miami, Florida. The rally passed through Reno, Nevada; Las Vegas; Tucson, Arizona; White Sands, New Mexico; San Antonio, Texas; and New Orleans. Featured participants included Travis Pastrana, professional skateboarder Tony Hawk, who drove in a Dodge Viper the late Jackass' Ryan Dunn. 2004 saw the Gumball rally commence at the Eiffel Tower in Paris proceed through Biarritz, Madrid, Marbella, across the Mediterranean Sea to Marrakesh, Morocco, before returning to Barcelona for the Grand Prix and finishing in Cannes for the Cannes Film Festival.

=== 2005–2009: Event growth ===
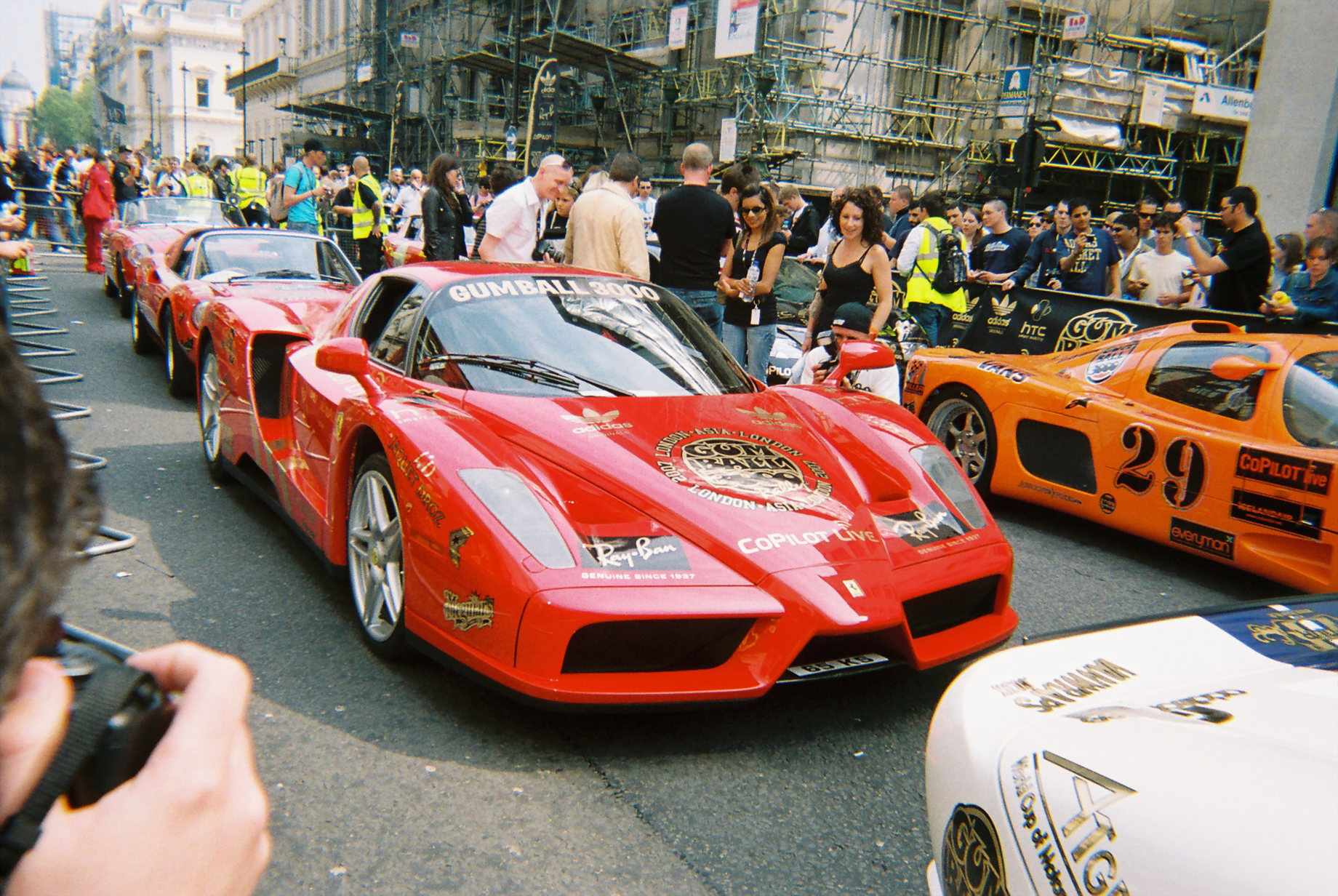
Ferrari Enzo – Gumball 3000, 2007

Jenson Button waved the start flag of the 2005 Gumball 3000, that travelled from London to Monte Carlo. Entrants drove through Brussels, Prague, Vienna, Budapest, Dubrovnik, Sicily, Rome and Florence, before crossing the finishing line in Monte Carlo. Models Caprice Bourret and Jodie Kidd joined singer Jay Kay from Jamiroquai, British rock band The Darkness and Ken Block in the list of celebrities taking part.

The 2006 starting flag was dropped in London where participants then travelled onto Vienna, Budapest and Belgrade, before jumping on a plane in Serbia to Thailand. The route then continued through Phuket and Bangkok, before flying to Salt Lake City and finishing with a party at the Playboy Mansion in Los Angeles. Travis Barker was present on the 2006 rally, as well as Martine McCutcheon, who drove a pink Range Rover in an all-female team. Gumball 3000 Films also produced a movie, 3000 Miles, following five other entrants: skateboarders Tony Hawk, Bam Margera and Mike Vallely, BMX rider Mike Escamilla and Margera's Jackass co-star, Ryan Dunn. The 2007 route was scheduled to travel from London to Istanbul, via Amsterdam, Munich, Tirana, Dubrovnik, and Athens. Over 100 contestants including actors Tamer Hassan and Danny Dyer and model and entrepreneur Caprice Bourret were scheduled to drive through 16 countries in eight days. The entrance fee for the 2007 rally was £28,000 for first-time drivers. In the 2007 event, two people in North Macedonia died in a traffic incident involving a participating rally vehicle. The incident occurred on 2 May 2007, when a TechArt Porsche 997 Turbo driven by Nicholas Morley collided with a Volkswagen Golf, whose occupants were both killed.

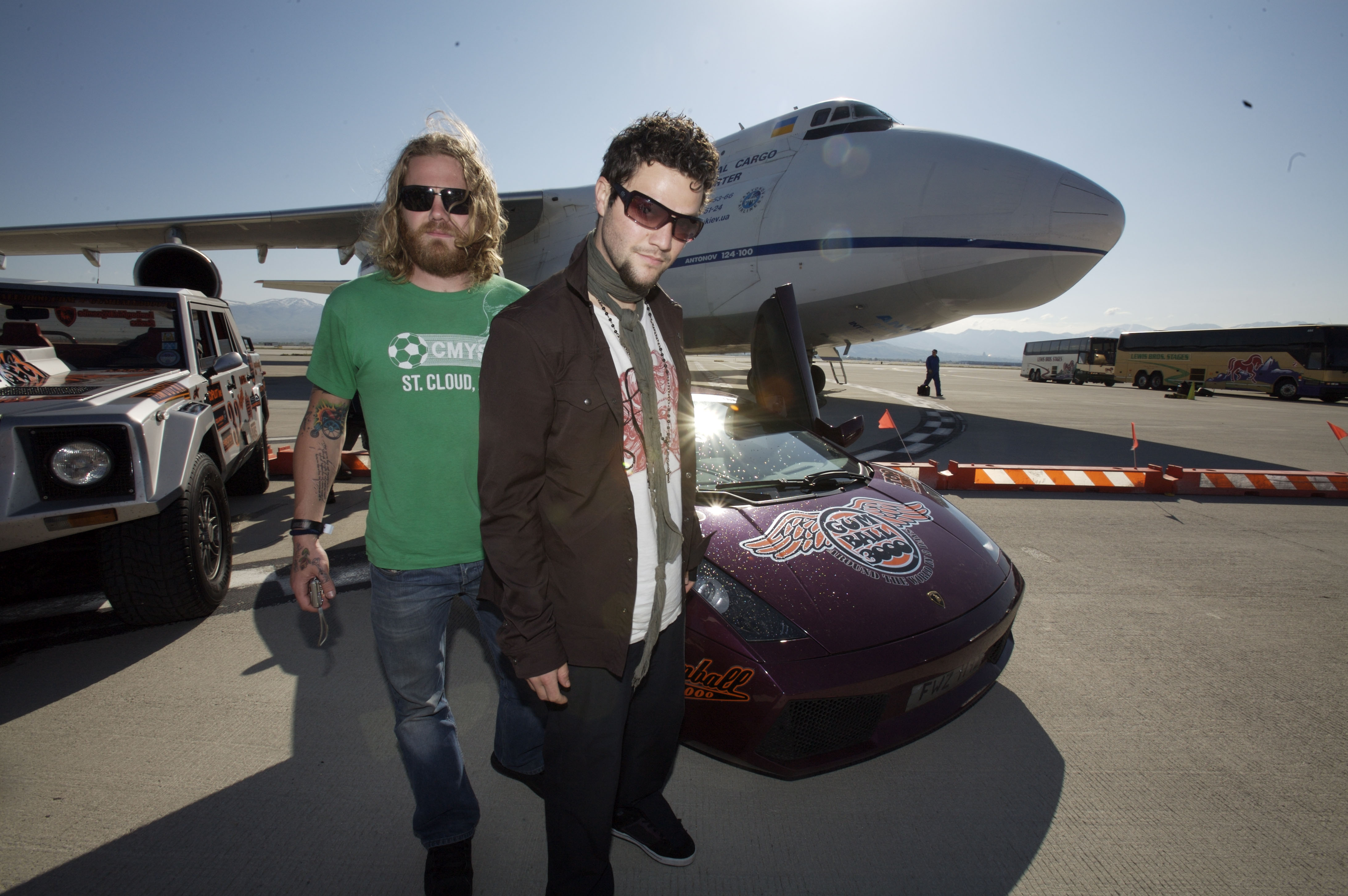
TV personalities Ryan Dunn (left) and Bam Margera (right) during the 2006 rally

The organisers of the Gumball 3000 initially continued with the rally until the facts about the incident became clear, at which point rally organisers canceled the remainder of event as a mark of respect. The subsequent court hearing found Morley guilty and convicted him of "endangering traffic, leading to death"; he was released from custody after receiving a two-year suspended sentence.

In 2008, the rally travelled from San Francisco to China, finishing at the Beijing Olympics. The rally passed through Los Angeles, San Diego and Las Vegas before flying to Nanjing in China and spending a night in North Korea for the Mass Games.

=== 2010–2019 ===
More than 100 cars took part in the rally in 2010. The rally began in London and ended in New York, passing through Amsterdam, Copenhagen, Stockholm, Boston, Quebec City and Toronto. Michael Madsen joined the rally, but was forced to leave the rally in Belgium after his driver was stopped by police for speeding. A number of other celebrities took part in the event, including Idris Elba and Cypress Hill. It was on this rally that Cooper met Grammy-winning US rapper Eve, who he later married in 2014 at the end of that year's rally.

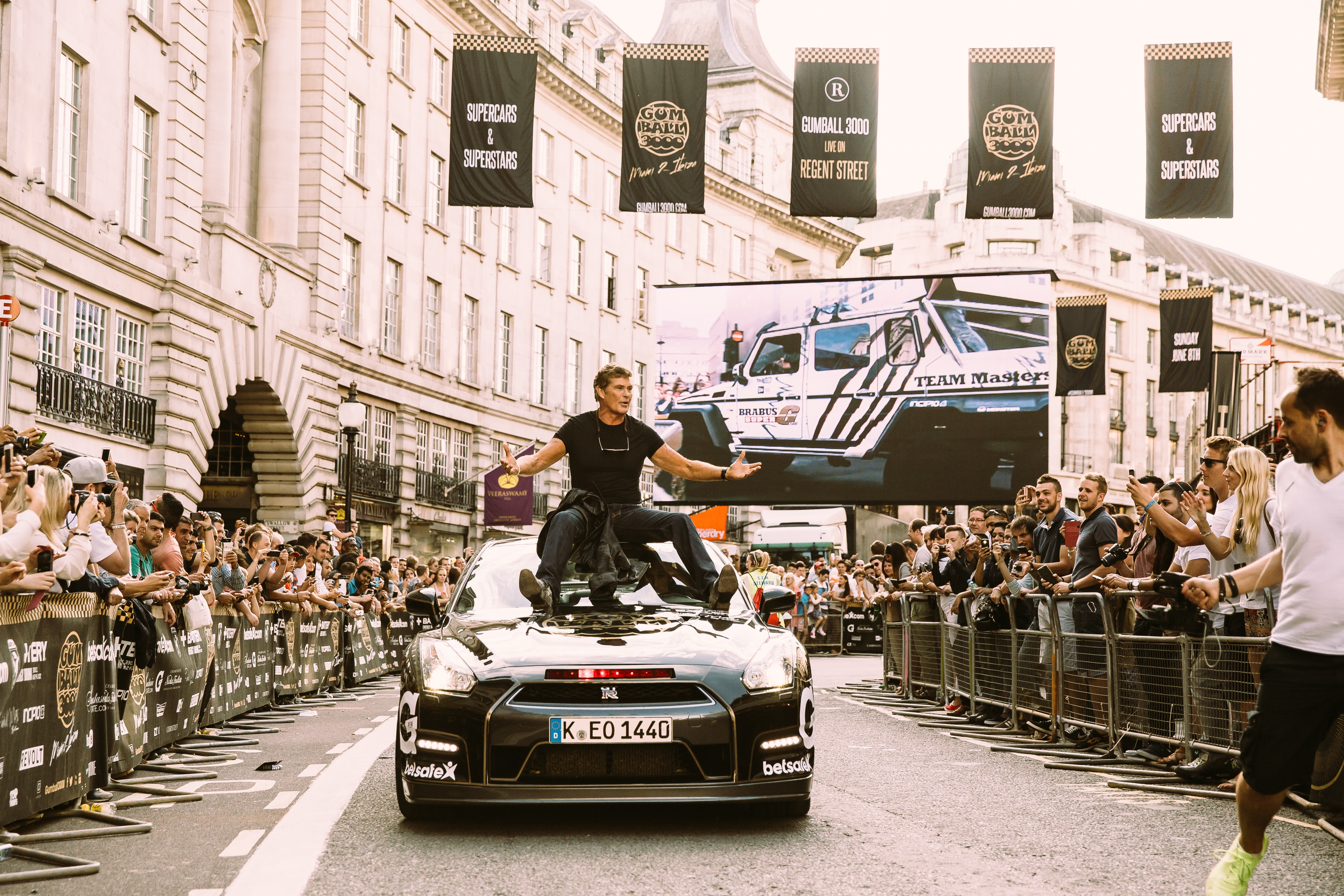
David Hasselhoff at the Gumball 3000 in London, 2014

Starting in London's Covent Garden, the 2011 Gumball 3000 rally saw the entrants drive through Paris, Barcelona, Monaco, Venice, and Croatia, before finishing in Istanbul. Attendees of the launch party at the Playboy Club in London included Jo Wood, The Saturdays Vanessa White and former Pussycat Doll Melody Thornton. Participants in the rally included David Hasselhoff, Eve, Xzibit and Tony Hawk.

The 2012 rally was a 'Sea to Shining Sea' route in the US from New York to Los Angeles, stopping in Toronto, Indianapolis, Kansas City, Santa Fe and Las Vegas.

In 2013 Chernin Entertainment and Warner Bros acquired the rights to produce and develop a film based around the Gumball 3000 rally.

In 2014, and with a cost for participants rising to a rumoured £40,000, the rally started in the United States in Miami, before passing through Atlanta and New York City before flying to Western Europe to conclude the rally, travelling from Edinburgh and continuing through London, Paris and Barcelona, before finally culminating on the island of Ibiza.

During the 2014 event, Deadmau5 and his co-driver Tory Belleci drove a Nyan Cat inspired Ferrari 458 Spider named 'Purrari' that received a cease-and-desist order from Ferrari. The car was listed on Craigslist following the rally and was sold for $380,000.

In 2015 participants followed a transatlantic route from Stockholm to Las Vegas. Stops included Norway, Denmark, Germany, the Netherlands, Reno, San Francisco and Los Angeles, with a drive through Death Valley before reaching Las Vegas. Lewis Hamilton joined the final stage of the rally from Los Angeles to Las Vegas driving a Koenigsegg Agera HH.

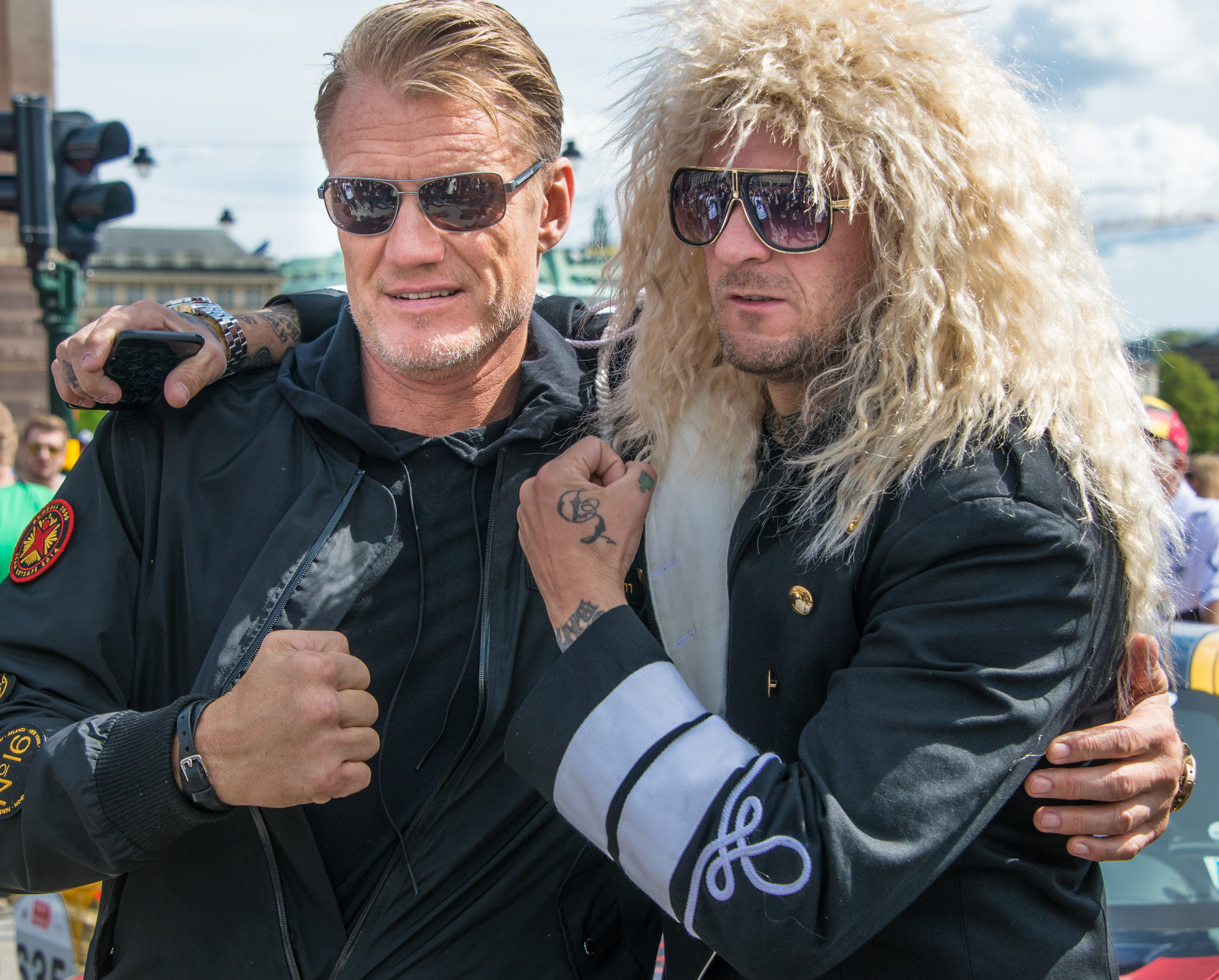
Dolph Lundgren and Mathew Pritchard at the 2015 rally

The 2016 rally was from Dublin to Bucharest. David Hasselhoff waved the start flag in Dublin to mark the beginning of the rally. The route took participants from Dublin to Edinburgh, London, Rust, Prague and Budapest before ending in Bucharest. Other famous faces that took part were F1 drivers David Coulthard and Jean Alesi, Grammy-winning rapper Eve, Dutch DJ Afrojack, Major Lazer, rapper Bun B, pop star Marlon Roudette, music producer Dallas Austin, Sullivan Stapleton, reality star Calum Best and YouTuber Calfreezy. The 2016 Gumball rally featured a one-off 'Batmobile' based on a Lamborghini Gallardo, driven by Team Galag. It is estimated that over one million fans attended the 2016 rally across all locations.

In 2017, the rally began on 1 July from Riga, passing through Warsaw, Kraków, Budapest, Dubrovnik, Porto Montenegro, Tirana, Volos, then Athens, and finally to Mykonos for two days.

2018 saw the return of intercontinental travel as part of a rally route. The rally began on 5 August starting in London, passing through Domaine De Chantilly in France, Sforza Castle in Milan, Italy and heading to Bologna to fly on "Gumball Air" (A Malaysia Airlines airplane hired by organisers, which stopped in Kazakhstan to refuel) to head to Osaka, Japan. All participating vehicles were flown to Japan via two cargo planes. From Osaka the rally headed to Kyoto, Nanao before crossing the finish line in Tokyo.

The 2019 Gumball 3000 Rally took place in June, starting in Mykonos, Greece, before finishing on the Spanish island of Ibiza. The rally passed through Thessaloniki, Greece, Porto Montenegro, Montenegro, Venice, Italy, Monaco and Barcelona, Spain. Dutch DJ Afrojack participated in a Bugatti Veyron Grand Sport Vitesse and a Bugatti Chiron in matching blue camo livery.

=== 2020–Present ===
In 2020, the Gumball 3000 Rally was due to head from Toronto, Canada to Havana, Cuba; however, the rally was cancelled due to the outbreak of the COVID-19 pandemic. This was the first time a full rally had been cancelled in Gumball 3000's history. The rally was eventually further postponed to May 2022 due to continued concerns surrounding the pandemic in 2021.

In May 2022 the postponed 22nd Annual Rally took place from Toronto, Canada to Miami, United States. The rally was originally intended to finish in Havana, Cuba. However, organisers changed finish line locations due to concerns caused by Cuba's relationship with Russia following the Russian invasion of Ukraine in March 2022.

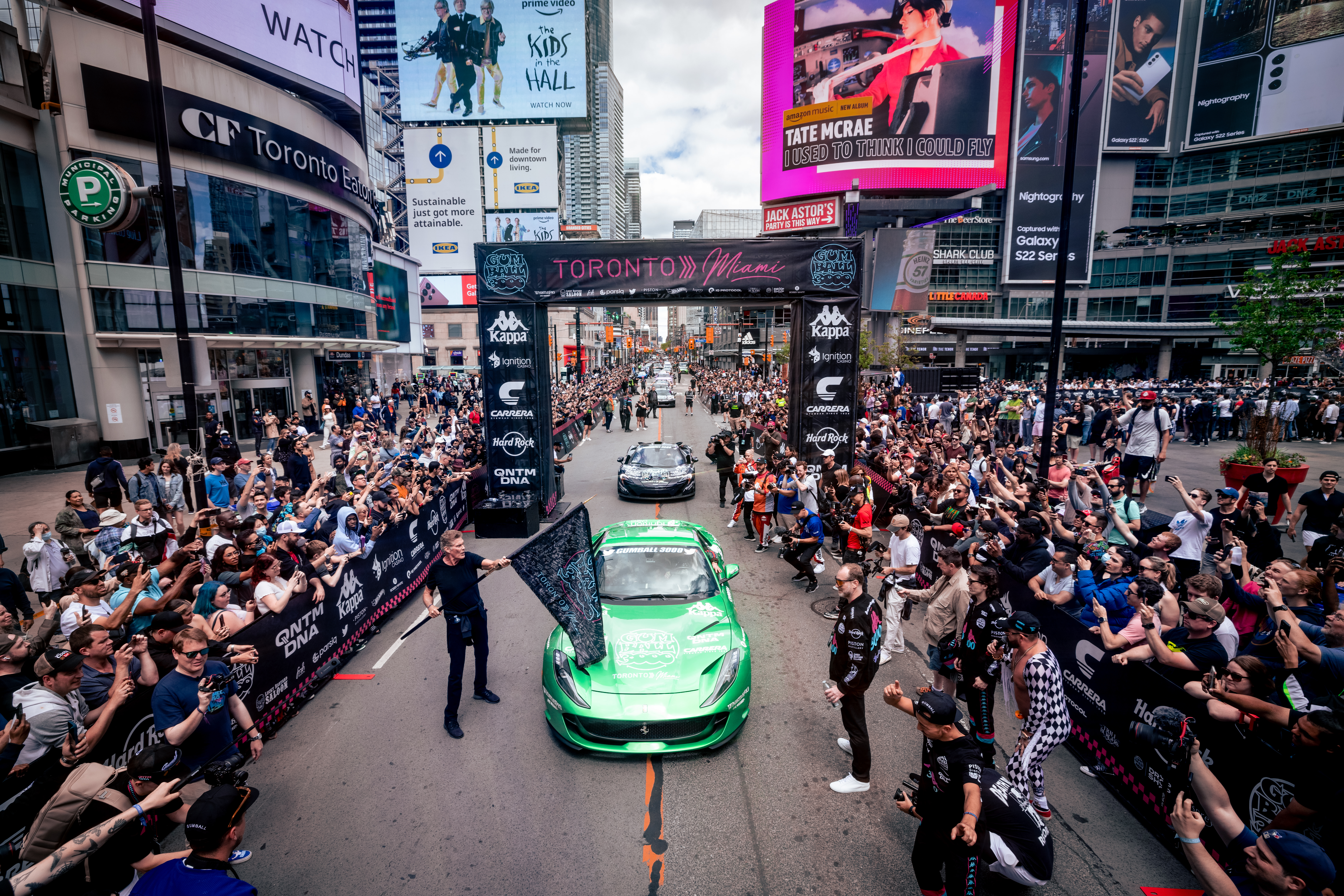
David Hasselhoff waves the start flag of the 2022 Gumball 3000 'Toronto-Miami' Rally.

The May 2022 rally began on 27 May with a free public concert in Toronto's Yonge–Dundas Square (now Sankofa Square) featuring performances from local artists and headline performances from rapper Bun B and deadmau5. The flag drop event took place in the same location the following day, with David Hasselhoff returning to drop the flag. The rally then travelled via Indianapolis (the Gumball participants watched the Indy 500 race with VIP hospitality), Nashville and Atlanta before crossing the finish line at the Inter Miami's DRV PNK Stadium, where the inaugural Gumball Goodwill Cup Charity Football Match took place, featuring the Gumball All-Stars XI facing a Laureus Sport for Good World XI.

For the first time in Gumball 3000 history, and in reaction to the cancelled 2020 & 2021 rallies, Gumball 3000 hosted two rallies in one year, with the 'Middle East' rally taking place in November 2022. The rally route began in Dubai, United Arab Emirates, and travelled a circular route through Oman via Jebel Akhdar, Salalah and Muscat before heading back into the UAE via Ras Al Khaimah, where Gumball 3000 joined the Global Citizen Forum Charity Gala. The rally crossed the finish line on 18 November in Abu Dhabi at the W Hotel, where Gumball participants enjoyed VIP Hospitality at the finale of the 2022 Formula One Season, the Abu Dhabi Grand Prix. A number of new celebrity participants joined for this rally, including influencers such as Michael Dapaah and rapper French Montana, who performed at the opening concert in Dubai.

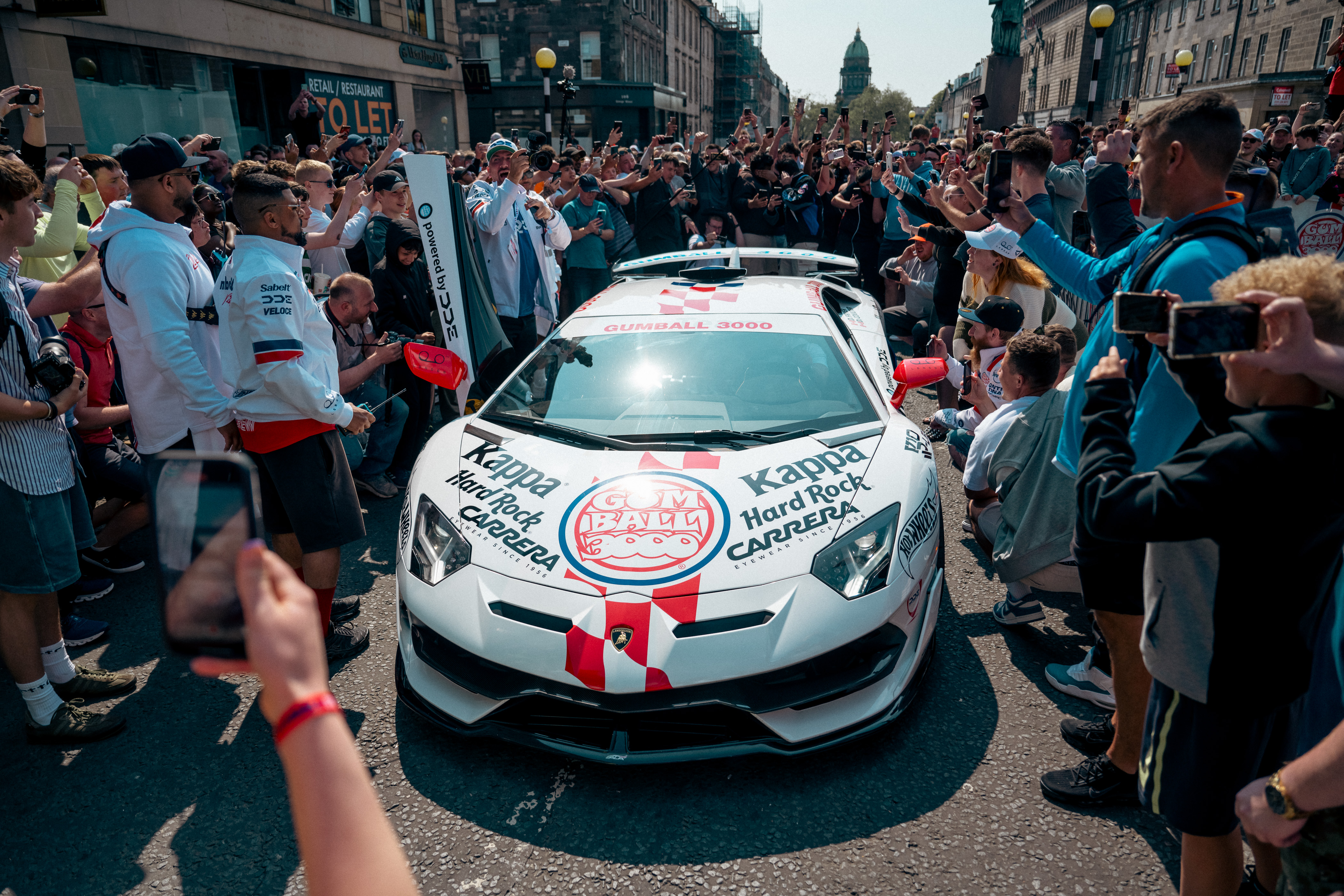
YouTubers DailyDrivenExotics in Edinburgh for the start of the 2023 Gumball 3000 Rally.

In June 2023, Gumball 3000 returned to Europe with a European Tour – the first time the rally had come to Europe for four years. The rally began on 10 June in Edinburgh, Scotland, before heading to London, England, Amsterdam, The Netherlands, Verbier, Switzerland, Venice, Italy and Budapest, Hungary, before crossing the finish line in the coastal resort of Porto Montenegro.

In September 2024, Gumball 3000 hosted its 25th Anniversary Rally in South East Asia. The rally began on 14 September in Saigon, Vietnam, before heading to Cambodia, Thailand, and Malaysia, before crossing the finish line in Singapore for the Singapore F1 Grand Prix. This years rally featured notable online personalities and superstars such as Patrice Evra, Jimmy Graham, Ja Rule, Vikkstar123, IShowSpeed, Sara Choi, Daily Driven Exotics and Binz. During the rally's stop in Cambodia, the Gumball 3000 Foundation held its annual charity auction and gala dinner at Angkor Wat, as part of its rally fundraising campaign. The event featured six auction lots and raised over $600,000 for charitable projects supporting underprivileged children worldwide, making it one of the foundation's most successful events to date. In addition to the charity activities, Gumball 3000 and Cambodian organizers achieved a Guinness World Record for the largest display of supercars at a UNESCO World Heritage Site, with 179 cars on display.

The 26th Gumball 3000 Rally took place from Istanbul - Ibiza] from 20 to 27 September 2025, in a route that included major stops in Bucharest, Belgrade, Florence, Nice and Valencia. Celebrities that participated in the 2025 edition included Patrice Evra, Jimmy Graham, Vikkstar123, Behzinga, TBJZL and WillNE.

== Gumball 3000 Foundation ==
The Gumball 3000 Foundation was established in 2013 to benefit underprivileged youth through education and recreational infrastructure based projects around the world. The mission is to give underprivileged youth greater opportunities in life, ensuring that the legacy of Gumball is both positive and lasting.

== Apparel, brand partnerships and popular culture ==
Gumball 3000's success has led to multiple business ventures and partnerships with major global brands.

The brand's popularity led to the launch of Gumball Apparel, which has been designed in-house and in collaboration with major fashion houses, including Puma, Adidas, Guess & Kappa. Gumball 3000 releases capsule collections that release alongside the Gumball 3000 rallies and other brand events throughout the year, alongside a continuity line called the 'OG Collection'.

In 2015, Guess announced a collaboration with Gumball 3000 for the 2015 rally. The brand designed exclusive drivers jackets for Gumball 3000 participants and participated in the Stockholm to Las Vegas rally in 3 Dodge Vipers, driven by three Guess models.

From 2018 - 2023, Gumball 3000 partnered with Italian sportswear brand Kappa to release their rally capsule collections. In the same period, Gumball 3000 partnered with Italian eyewear brand Carrera for a number of limited-edition eyewear releases.

In addition to apparel, Gumball 3000 has released a number of licensed and collaborative products in various entertainment categories, including luxury, alcohol, movies, video games, and toys.

In 2000, Top Trumps released a version of their card game using the Gumball 3000 brand name. In 2002, a video game based on Gumball 3000 was released for the PlayStation 2 console, developed by Climax Studios and published by SCi.

Gumball 3000 announced a partnership with MTV in 2001 to cover the rally for five years. MTV also covered the 2007 rally.

Gumball 3000 has released a number of limited-edition toy cars with American scale model brand Hot Wheels. Gumball 3000 Edition Hot Wheels cars are premium models within the Hot Wheels brand.

Over its history, Gumball 3000 has collaborated with numerous major alcohol brands, including Jägermeister, Belaire, WhistlePig & XIX Vodka. The partnerships have included licensed limited-edition products and support at Gumball 3000 events.

Currently, Gumball 3000's collaborative 'Gumball Orange' flavoured vodka with the Sidemen's XIX Vodka brand retails in Tesco stores and in Wetherspoons locations across the UK. To promote the XIX Vodka collaboration, Sidemen member Vikkstar drove in the 2024 Gumball 3000 Rally alongside YouTubers LazarBeam & Lachlan, in a Land Rover Defender 130 wrapped identically to the bottle design of 'Gumball Orange'.

Gumball 3000 has released a number of limited-edition watches with major watch manufacturers, including Nixon, Armin Strom and G-Shock. In 2024, Gumball 3000 released a limited-edition version of Swiss watch brand Ulysse Nardin's 'Freak' model, limited to 150 units worldwide.

In 2023, Gumball 3000 announced Hard Rock as an Official Hotel & Casino Partner, in a long-term multi-million dollar sponsorship deal. The deal has included use of Hard Rock venues throughout Gumball 3000 Rally events, including the Guitar Hotel in Fort Lauderdale as the official destination for the final leg of the 'Toronto to Miami' 2022 Gumball 3000 Rally. The deal also includes Limited Edition apparel collaborations and that retail on Gumball 3000's website and in select Hard Rock locations worldwide, and in 2023, the brand released Limited Edition menu items in their Edinburgh, Venice, London and Budapest locations to celebrate the 2023 Gumball 3000 Rally.

Gumball 3000 has partnered with a number of automotive brands for a number of purposes, included support vehicles for crew & staff travelling on the rally, celebrity and sponsor vehicles and for events along the rally. Automotive brands that have partnered with Gumball 3000 include Abarth, Alfa Romeo, Nissan, Rimac, Aston Martin and Koenigsegg.

== Routes ==
Date	Region(s)	Route	Notes
1999	Europe	London, England » Paris, France » Le Mans, France » Monaco » Rimini, Italy » Nürburgring, Germany » London, England	
2000	Europe	London, England » Bilbao, Spain » Cannes, France » Milan, Italy » Baden-Baden, Germany » Hockenheim, Germany » Hamburg, Germany » London, England	
2001	Europe	London, England » Berlin, Germany » Vilnius, Lithuania » Saint Petersburg, Russia via Latvia » Helsinki, Finland » Stockholm, Sweden » Copenhagen, Denmark » Beaulieu, England	
2002	North America	New York City, New York » Washington, D.C. » Nashville, Tennessee » Dallas, Texas » Sante Fe, New Mexico » Las Vegas, Nevada » Los Angeles, California	
2003	North America	San Francisco, California » Reno, Nevada » Las Vegas, Nevada » Tucson, Arizona » White Sands, New Mexico » San Antonio, Texas » New Orleans, Louisiana » Miami, Florida	
2004	Europe and Africa	Paris, France » Clermont-Ferrand, France » Madrid, Spain » Marbella, Spain » Casablanca, Morocco » Marrakesh, Morocco » Barcelona, Spain » Cannes, France	
2005	Europe	London, England » Brussels, Belgium » Prague, Czech Republic » Vienna, Austria » Budapest, Hungary » Dubrovnik, Croatia » Taormina, Italy » Rome, Italy » Florence, Italy » Monaco	
2006	Europe, Asia and North America	London, England » Vienna, Austria » Budapest, Hungary » Belgrade, Serbia » Phuket, Thailand » Bangkok, Thailand » Salt Lake City, Utah » Las Vegas, Nevada » Los Angeles, California	
2007	Europe	London, England » Amsterdam, Netherlands » Frankfurt-Hahn, Germany » Istanbul, Turkey » Tirana, Albania » Dubrovnik, Croatia » Bratislava, Slovakia	
2008	North America and Asia	San Francisco, California » Los Angeles, California » San Diego, California » Las Vegas, Nevada » Pyongyang, North Korea » Hangzhou, China » Shanghai, China » Xuzhou, China » Beijing, China	
2009	North America	Santa Monica, California » Las Vegas, Nevada » Sedona, Arizona » Santa Fe, New Mexico » Dallas, Texas » New Orleans, Louisiana » Orlando, Florida » Miami, Florida	
2010	Europe and North America	London, England » Amsterdam, Netherlands » Copenhagen, Denmark » Stockholm, Sweden » Boston, Massachusetts » Quebec City, Canada » Toronto, Canada » New York City, New York	
2011	Europe	London, England » Paris, France » Barcelona, Spain » Monaco » Venice, Italy » Belgrade, Serbia » Sofia, Bulgaria » Istanbul, Turkey	
2012	North America	New York City, New York » Niagara Falls » Toronto, Canada » Indianapolis, Indiana » Kansas City, Kansas » Santa Fe, New Mexico » Las Vegas, Nevada » Los Angeles, California	
2013	Europe	Copenhagen, Denmark » Stockholm, Sweden » Helsinki, Finland » Saint Petersburg, Russia » Tallinn, Estonia » Riga, Latvia » Vilnius, Lithuania » Warsaw, Poland » Kraków, Poland » Vienna, Austria » Monaco	
2014	North America and Europe	Miami, Florida » Atlanta, Georgia » New York City, New York » Edinburgh, Scotland » Manchester, England » London, England » Paris, France » Barcelona, Spain » Valencia, Spain » Ibiza, Spain	
2015	Europe and North America	Stockholm, Sweden » Oslo, Norway » Copenhagen, Denmark » Amsterdam, Netherlands » Reno, Nevada » San Francisco, California » Los Angeles, California » Las Vegas, Nevada	
2016	Europe	Dublin, Ireland » Belfast, Northern Ireland » Edinburgh, Scotland » Manchester, England » London, England » Rust, Germany » Prague, Czech Republic » Budapest, Hungary » Transylvania, Romania » Bucharest, Romania	
2017	Europe	Riga, Latvia » Vilnius, Lithuania » Warsaw, Poland » Kraków, Poland » Budapest, Hungary » Dubrovnik, Croatia » Porto Montenegro, Montenegro » Tirana, Albania » Volos, Greece » Athens, Greece » Mykonos, Greece	
2018	Europe and Asia	London, England » Chantilly, France » Milan, Italy » Bologna, Italy » Osaka, Japan » Kyoto, Japan » Nanao, Japan » Tokyo, Japan	
2019	Europe	Mykonos, Greece » Thessaloniki, Greece, » Porto Montenegro, Montenegro » Venice, Italy » Monaco » Barcelona, Spain » Ibiza, Spain	
2022	North America	Toronto, Canada » Indianapolis, Indiana » Nashville, Tennessee » Atlanta, Georgia » Miami, Florida	
2022	Middle East	Dubai, United Arab Emirates » Jebel Akhdar, Oman » Salalah, Oman » Muscat, Oman » Ras Al Khaimah, United Arab Emirates » Abu Dhabi, United Arab Emirates	
2023	Europe	Edinburgh, Scotland » London, England » Amsterdam, Netherlands » Verbier, Switzerland » Venice, Italy » Budapest, Hungary » Porto Montenegro Tivat, Montenegro	
2024	South East Asia	Ho Chi Minh City, Vietnam » Phnom Penh, Cambodia » Angkor Wat, Cambodia » Bangkok, Thailand » Krabi, Thailand » Kuala Lumpur & Sepang, Malaysia » Singapore F1 Grand Prix, Singapore	
2025	Europe	Istanbul, Turkey » Bucharest, Romania » Belgrade, Serbia » Florence, Italy » Nice, France » Valencia, Spain » Ibiza, Spain	
2026	North America	Miami, Florida » Amelia Island, Florida » New Orleans, Louisiana » Austin, Texas » Monterrey, Mexico » San Miguel, Mexico » Mexico City, Mexico	

== See also ==
- The Gumball Rally, 1976 film
- Te Te rally
