= List of Jackass cast members =

This is a full list of cast and crew members, and guest appearances of the MTV stunt television and movie series Jackass.

== Main cast members ==
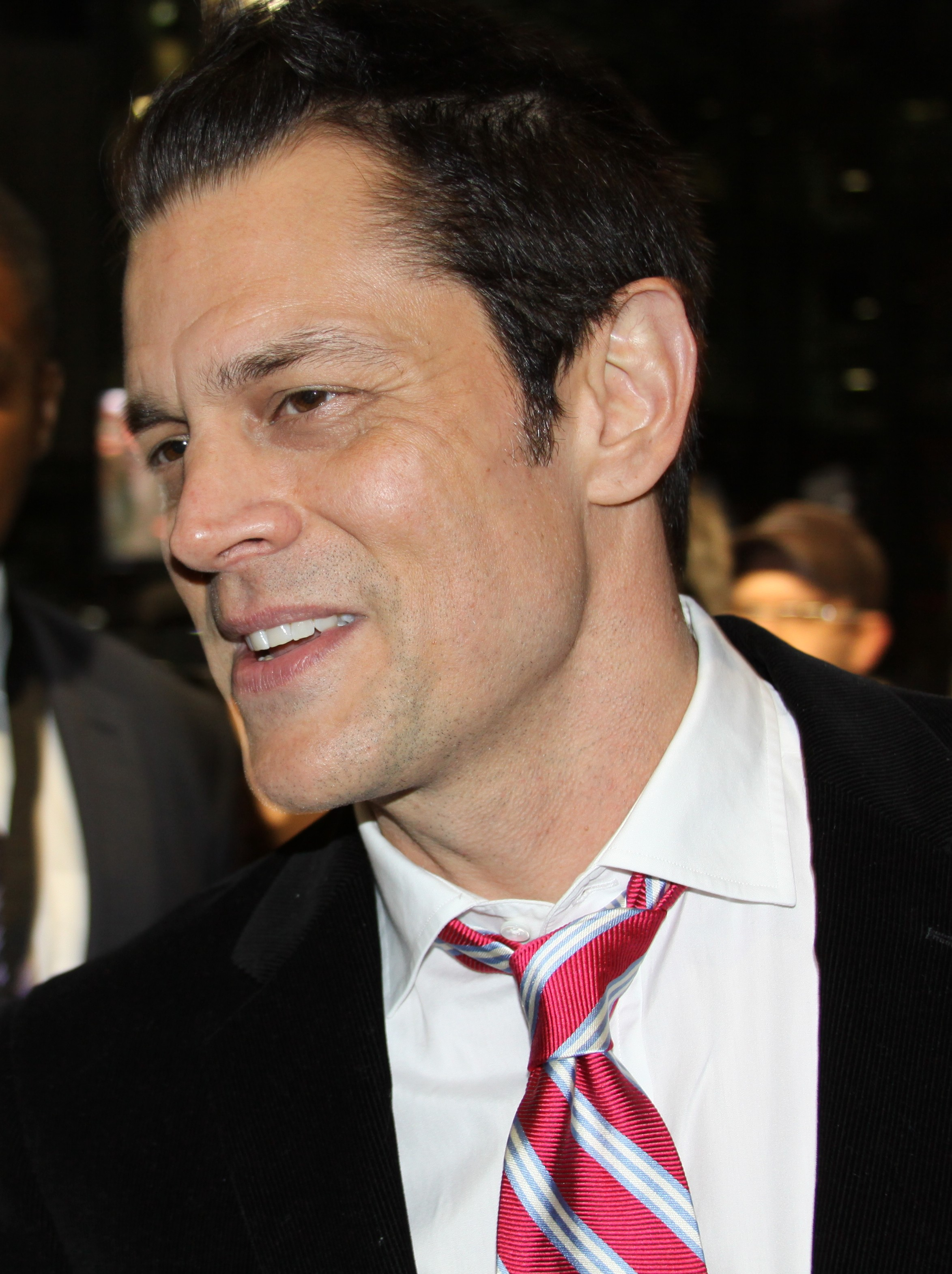
Johnny Knoxville

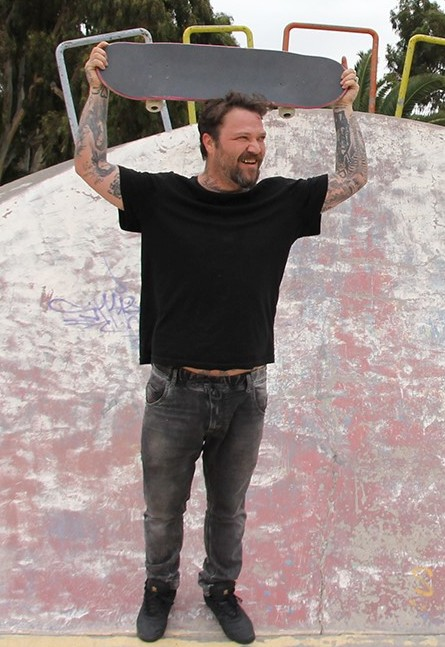
Bam Margera

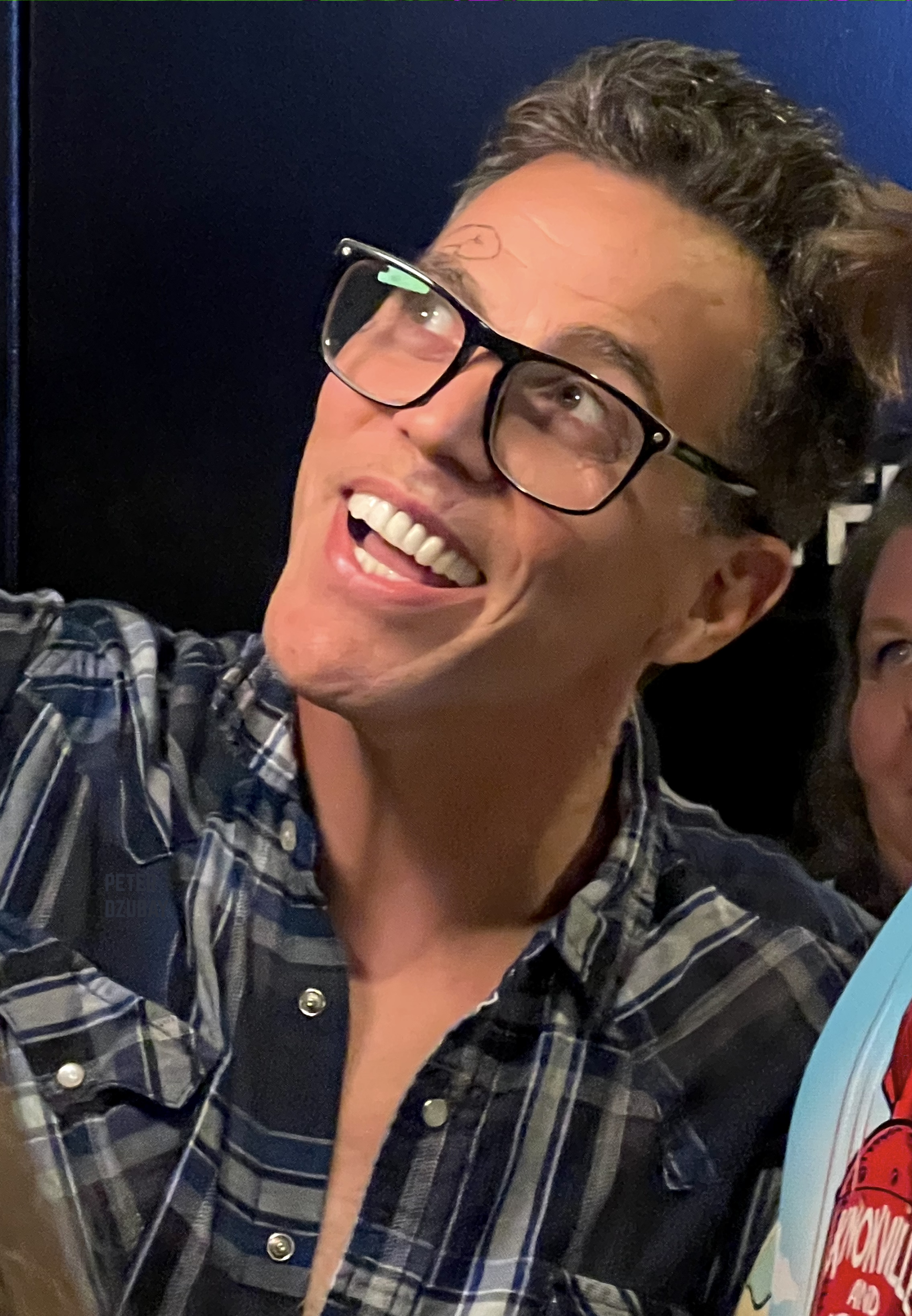
Steve-O

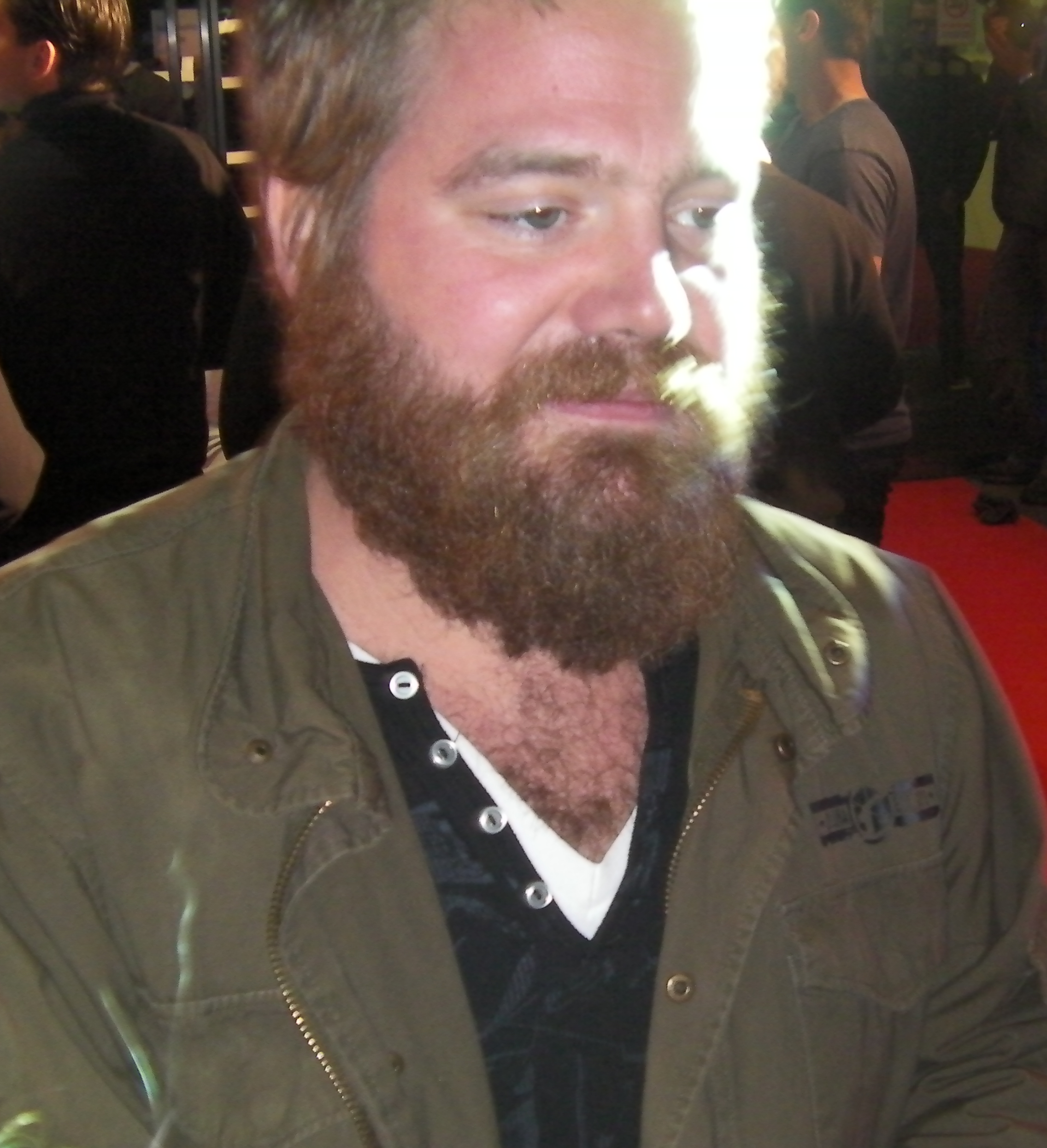
Ryan Dunn

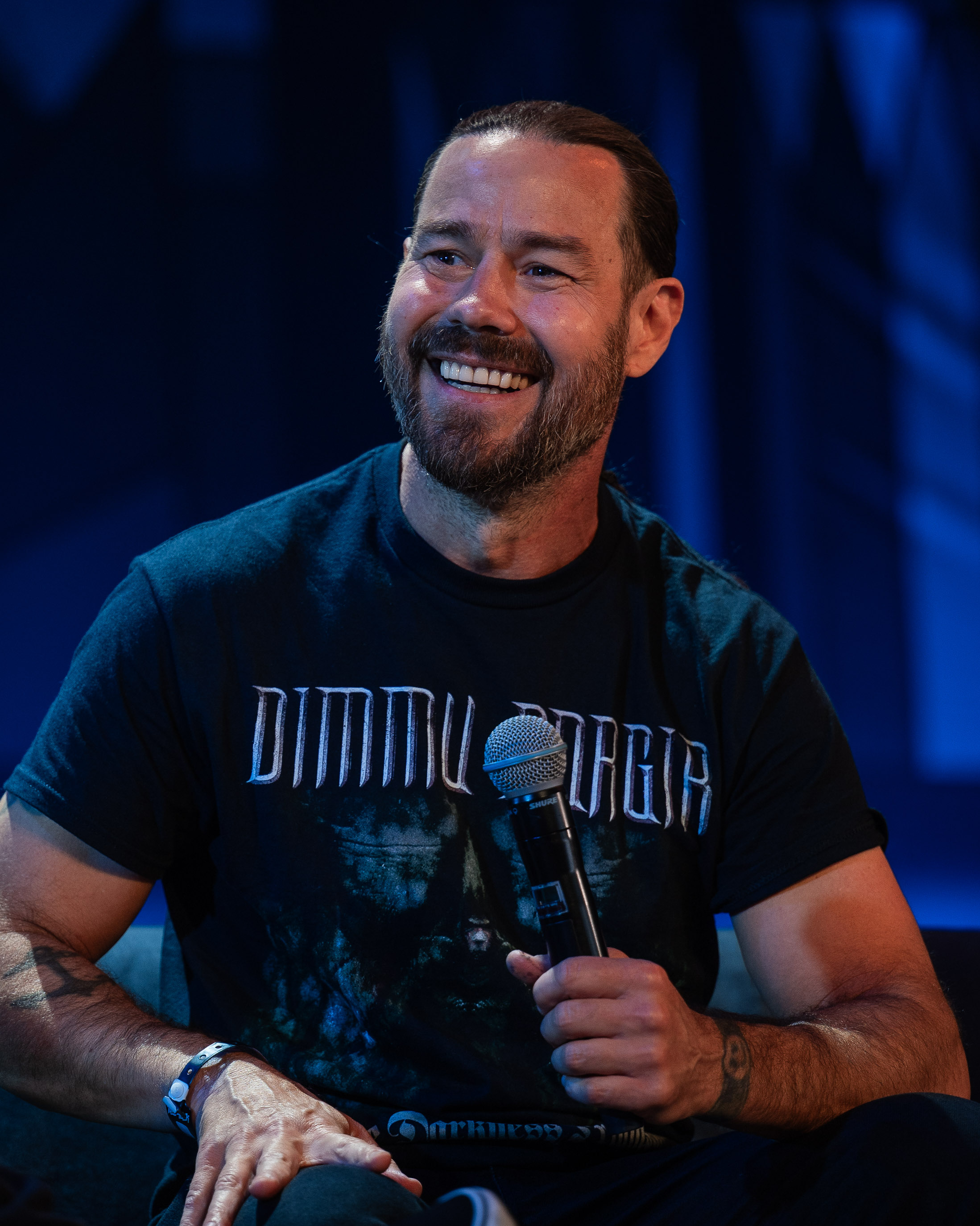
Chris Pontius

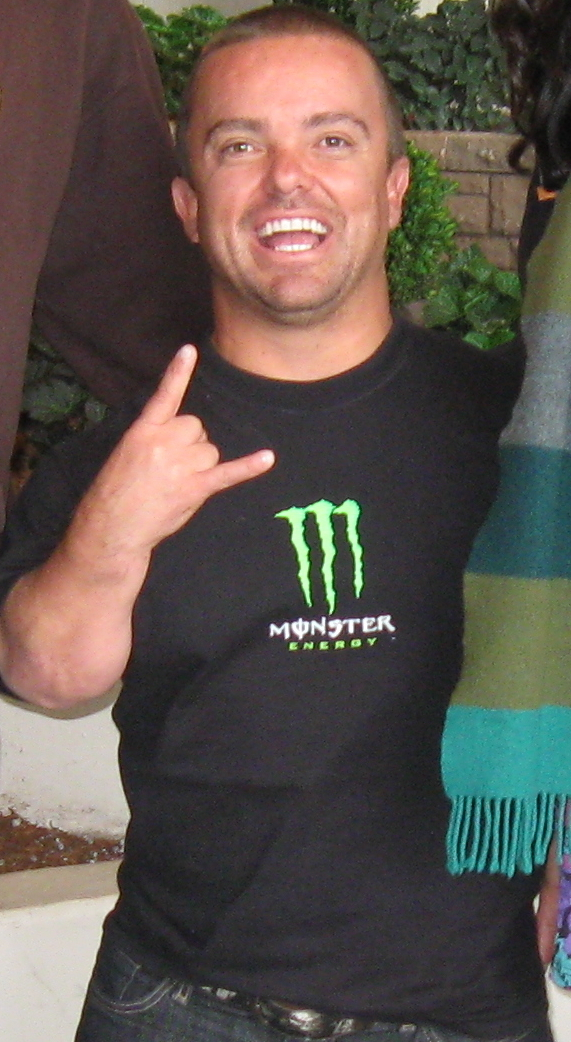
Jason "Wee Man" Acuña

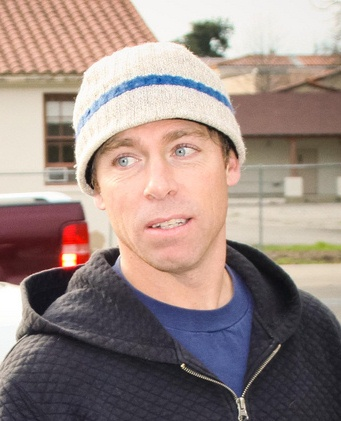
Dave England

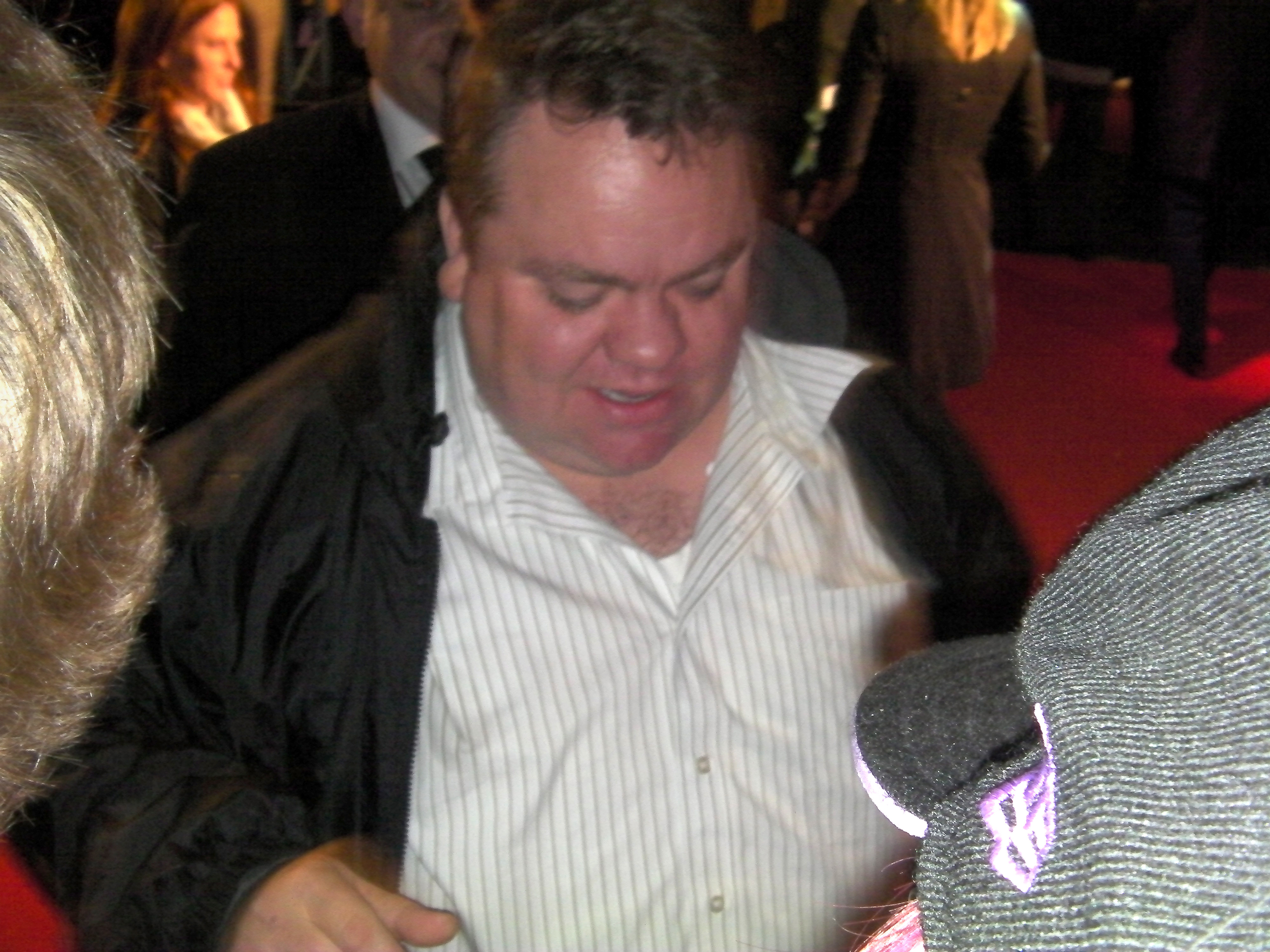
Preston Lacy

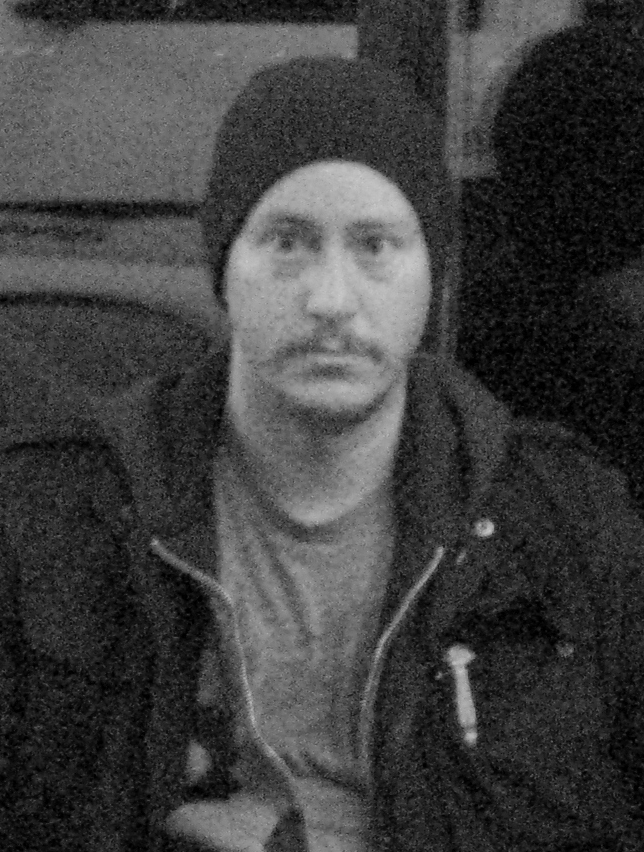
"Danger Ehren" McGhehey

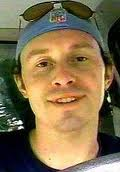
Brandon DiCamillo
- Johnny Knoxville
- Bam Margera
- Steve-O
- Ryan Dunn (until his death in 2011)
- Chris Pontius
- Jason "Wee Man" Acuña
- Dave England
- Preston Lacy
- "Danger Ehren" McGhehey
- Brandon DiCamillo (until 2007)

=== New cast members (2022–2026) ===
- Sean "Poopies" McInerney
- Zach Holmes
- Jasper Dolphin
- Rachel Wolfson
- Eric Manaka
- Compston "Dark Shark" Wilson

== Film crew ==
- Jeff Tremaine
- Spike Jonze
- Dimitry Elyashkevich
- Sean Cliver
- Rick Kosick
- Trip Taylor
- Greg "Guch" Iguchi
- Lance Bangs
- Knate Lee
- Cordell Mansfield
- Shanna Zablow Newton
- J.P. Blackmon
- Ben "Benzo" Kaller
- Joe Frantz
- Seth Meisterman
- Rob "Whitey" McConnaughey
- Greg Wolf
- Derek Freda
- Matthew Kosinski

== Recurring cast members ==
- Chris Raab (a.k.a. Raab Himself)
- Rake Yohn
- Brandon Novak
- April Margera
- Phil Margera
- Jess Margera
- Loomis Fall
- Manny Puig
- Mike Kassak
- Stephanie Hodge
- Jason "J2" Rasmus
- Dave Carnie
- Chris Nieratko

== Special guest appearances/crew members ==
=== A–E ===
- Erik Ainge
- Marilynn Allain
- Jared Allen
- Daniel Alvarez
- Vincent Alvarez
- Eric André
- Chris "Hoofbité" Aspite
- Chris Arreola
- Will "The Farter" Bakey
- Edward Barbanell
- Dorothy Barnett
- Kenny Bartram
- Beavis
- Derrick Beckles
- Andy Bell
- Becky Bell
- Brian Bell
- Tory Belleci
- Travis "Taco" Bennett
- Steve Berra
- Parks Bonifay
- Party Boy
- Lionel Boyce
- Lara Flynn Boyle
- Half Pint Brawlers
- Josh Brown
- Kobe Bryant
- Butterbean
- Butt-Head
- Georgina Cates
- Mike Carroll
- Jay Chandrasekhar
- Errol Chatham
- Vernon Chatman
- Shridhar Chillal
- Nitro Circus
- Madison Clapp
- Phil Clapp
- Rocko Clapp
- Mike Cook (a.k.a. Midget Mike)
- Allan Cooke
- Tré Cool
- Guy Cooper
- Maximillion Cooper
- Tyler, the Creator
- CKY
- CKY crew
- Elliott Cullen
- Rivers Cuomo
- Madison Davis
- Slater Davis
- Dave Decurtis (a.k.a. Naked Dave)
- Jason Deeringer
- Thor Drake
- The Dudesons
- Colton Dunn
- Rob Dyrdek
- Ramy Elgazar
- Mike Ellis
- Seth Enslow

=== F–J ===
- Fatlip
- George Faughnan
- "Beautiful Jason" Fijal
- Seamus Frawley
- Odd Future
- Tony Gardner
- Willie Garson
- Ryan Gee
- Breana Geering
- Kerry Getz
- Shannon Gibbs
- Chad I Ginsburg
- Mark Gonzales
- David Gravette
- Charlie Grisham
- Trigger Gumm
- Davin "Psycho" Halford
- Scott Handley
- Chris Hanna
- Frank Hansen
- Greg Harris
- Zachary Hartwell
- Eddie Harvey (legend)
- Paul Walter Hauser
- Tony Hawk
- Kamber Hejlik
- Jukka Hildén
- Tigi Hill
- Mat Hoffman
- Aaron "Jaws" Homoki
- Rick Howard
- George Hruska
- Mike Hudson
- Nigel Hudson (a.k.a. The UK Hammer)
- Juicy J
- Atiba Jefferson
- Terra Jolé
- Mike Judge

=== K–O ===
- Jim Karol
- Chris Kato
- Catherine Keener
- Machine Gun Kelly
- Jill Kill
- Jimmy Kimmel
- Michelle Klepper
- Evel Knievel
- Lemoyne Knoxville
- Eric Koston
- Nick Kreiss
- Naoko Kumagai
- Jarno Laasala
- Kristin Lane
- Bucky Lasek
- Chris Lawrence
- Gene LeBell
- Mikey LeBlanc
- Stevie Lee
- Brett Leffew
- Gary Leffew
- Jed Leffew
- Judd Leffew
- Brandon Leffler
- Jarppi Leppälä
- Bunny the Lifeguard
- Sam Macaroni
- Three 6 Mafia
- Marisa Magee
- Sean Malto
- Garbage Man
- Scott Manning
- Otmara Marrero
- Grasie Mercedes
- Jesse Merlin
- Nick Merlino
- Deron Miller
- Minutemen
- Dr. Julie Mizener
- Ed Moore (a.k.a. Ed the Medic)
- Francis Ngannou
- Jackson Nicoll
- T-Nigs
- Karen O
- Craig O'Connell
- Will Oldham
- Shaquille O'Neal
- Danielle O'Toole

=== P–T ===
- Natalie Palamides
- Missy Parkin
- HP Parviainen
- Tommy Passemante (a.k.a. Street Bike Tommy)
- Travis Pastrana
- Project Pat
- DJ Paul
- Courtney Pauroso
- Smut Peddlers
- Patty Perez (a.k.a. Goddess Patty)
- Brad Pitt
- Scott Plamer
- Jack Polick (a.k.a. Handsome Jack)
- Axe Pontius
- Scott Potasnik
- Gregory Powell (a.k.a. Special Greg)
- Tim Powers
- Matthew Probst
- Stephen Prouty
- Mark Rackley
- Jalen Ramsey
- Jason "J2" Rasmus
- Adam Ray
- Chief Roberts
- Dave Roen
- Missy Rothstein
- Henry Rollins
- Joe Romeiro
- Erik Roner
- Michael Rooney
- Jeffrey Ross
- Don Ruffin
- Sarah de Sa Rego
- Jeff "Harley" Schneider
- Seann William Scott
- Lauren Sesselmann
- Alia Shawkat
- Sarah Sherman
- Joseph Shirley
- Scott Shriner
- Scott Simmons
- Angie Simms
- Ryan Simonetti
- Clyde Singleton
- Slash
- Sleepy
- Barry Owen Smoler
- Daewon Song
- Spanky Spangler
- Britney Spears
- Arthur H. Spiegel III
- Sam Spiegel
- Starcrawler
- Brent Stoller
- Billy Strings
- P.K. Subban
- Sergio Suberbie
- Priya Swaminathan
- Syd
- Jules Sylvester
- The Deadly Syndrome
- Jason Taylor
- Rip Taylor
- Van Toffler
- Bobby Tovey
- Dave Tremaine

=== U–Z ===
- Ville Valo
- Jolene Van Vugt
- Ivan Victor
- Roger Alan Wade
- Al Walker
- Strider Wasilewski
- John Waters
- Ruby Wax
- David Weathers
- Weezer
- Andrew Weinberg
- Jennifer Welsh
- Boyd Willat
- Luke Wilson
- Andrew W.K.
- Greg Wolf (a.k.a. Wolfie)
- James Woodard
- Dana Michael Woods
- Yelawolf
- Irving Zisman
- Mark Zupan
