= Jason Acuña =

American stunt performer and television personality (born 1973)

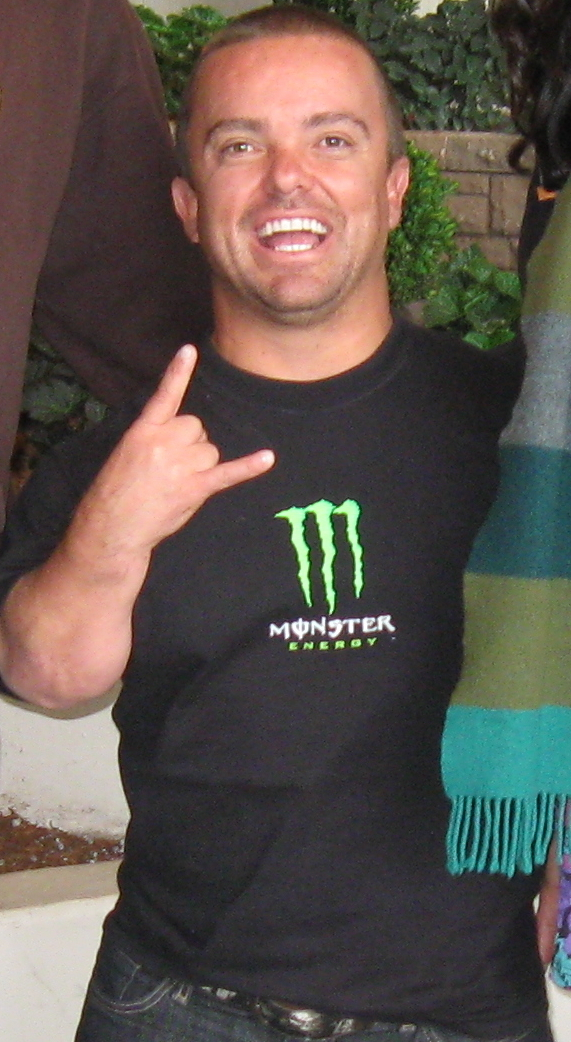
- Acuña in 2009
- Born: Jason Shannon Acuña; May 16, 1973 (age 53); Pisa, Italy
- Other name: Wee Man
- Occupations: Stunt performer, television personality, skateboarder, actor
- Years active: 1996–present
- Known for: Co-star of Jackass
- Height: 4 ft 6 in (137 cm)
- Website: weeman.com

Jason Shannon Acuña (born May 16, 1973), better known by his stage name Wee Man (Note: The stage name has been spelled as "Weeman", "WeeMan", "Wee-Man" and "Wee Man" over the years. Acuña himself has expressed no preference, but noted his own reflex is to spell it "WeeMan".), is an Italian-born American stunt performer, television personality, professional skateboarder, and actor. He is one of the stars of the reality comedy series Jackass and the host of Fox Sports Net's skateboarding show 54321. Acuña has achondroplasia, a form of dwarfism.

== Life and career ==
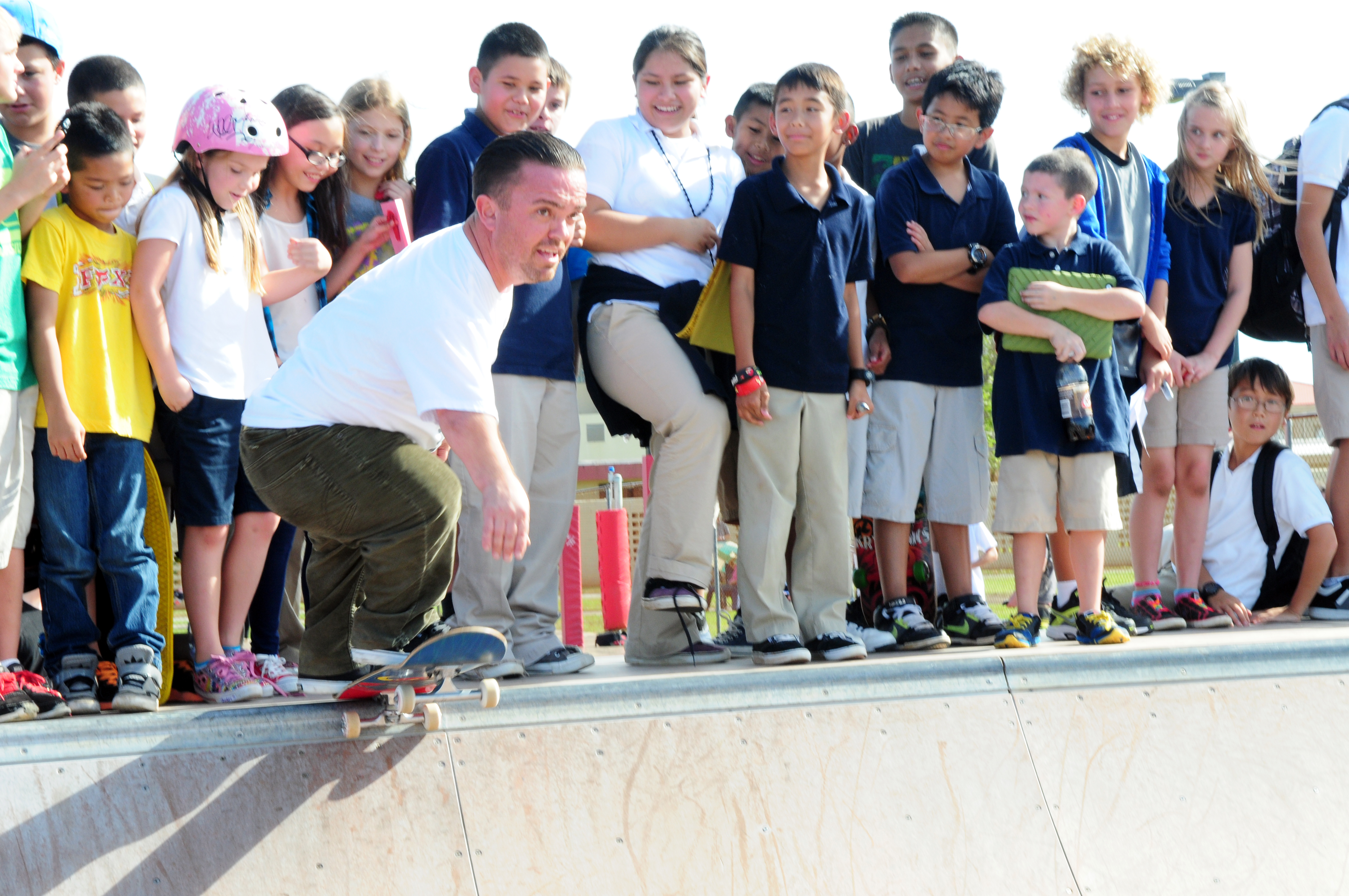
Acuña skating at Andersen Air Force Base in 2013

Wee Man was born Jason Acuña in Pisa, Italy, where his father was stationed with the U.S. Army at the time. He grew up in Torrance, California, a suburb of Los Angeles, and attended North High School. He is of Mexican and German descent. He got his nickname from World Industries CEO Steve Rocco's brother Sal, who was the warehouse manager at the time. He was the subscription manager for the skateboard magazine Big Brother. His association with that magazine led him to become involved with the Jackass television series in 2000.

Acuña's Jackass antics include skating as an Oompa-Loompa, kicking himself in the head, dressing as a king while rolling Johnny Knoxville down a staircase in a red carpet, and doing deep-knee bends while holding basketball star Shaquille O'Neal on his back. A recurring gag involves Preston Lacy asking someone to help him with his bags, only to have Acuña pop out, causing Lacy to chase him.

In 2007, Acuña starred in the reality TV series Armed and Famous, and in July 2007, Acuña appeared on TV as a host of MTV's Scarred.

Acuña appeared on the first season of NBC's Celebrity Circus. In the fourth week of competition, he became the first contestant to receive a perfect score (a 10-point average). Acuña ended the season in third place.

Acuña is an investor in the Chronic Tacos chain of fast casual Mexican restaurants. His first franchise location opened in 2010 in Redondo Beach, California. After a few years of trying to make this location a success, Acuña closed the location permanently, and in February 2018, he opened a Chronic Tacos franchise in Long Beach, California.

In 2012, Acuña starred in the direct-to-video holiday film Elf-Man as the title character. This was his first role in a family-friendly feature film.

== Filmography ==
=== Films ===
Year	Film	Role	Notes
2001	The Same	The Little Man	Included as a segment in Zéro un (2003) and in Stories of Lost Souls (2005)
2002	Jackass: The Movie	Himself	Writer
2003	Grind	Little Timmy	as Wee Man
2004	Bashing	Rockwell Stone	
2005	Pee Stains and Other Disasters	Franklin	as Wee Man
2005	Death to the Supermodels	Dieter	as Jason "Wee-Man" Acuña
2006	National Lampoon's TV: The Movie	Various	
2006	Jackass Number Two	Himself	Writer
2007	The Man Who Souled the World	Himself	Documentary; Narrator
2007	Jackass 2.5	Himself	Writer
2009	We Gotta Get Buscemi	Himself	Documentary
2010	Jackass 3D	Himself	Writer
2011	Jackass 3.5	Himself	Writer
2012	Elf-Man	Elf-Man	Executive producer, first role in a family feature film
2014	Behaving Badly	Brian Savage	
2017	Dumb: The Story of Big Brother Magazine	Himself	Documentary
2022	Jackass Forever	Himself	Writer
2022	Jackass 4.5	Himself	Writer
2025	Spinal Tap II: The End Continues	Damien The Druid	
2026	Jackass: Best and Last	Himself	Writer; Co-producer

=== Television ===
Year	Title	Role	Notes
2000–2001	Jackass	Himself	21 episodes
2002	Jackass Backyard BBQ	Himself	TV movie
2002	MTV Video Music Awards Latinoamérica 2002	Himself	Presenter
2002–2003	MADtv	Himself	Guest star, 2 episodes
2003	Punk'd	Himself	Episode 1.7
2003	The New Tom Green Show	Himself	1 episode Guest appearance
2003	Player$	Himself	Episode 2.17, "Boom Boom Yeah!"
2004–2006	Wildboyz	Himself	6 episodes
2005	America's Next Top Model	Himself	Episode 5.8
2006	Celebrity Deathmatch	Himself	Voice; 1 episode
2006	2006 Teen Choice Awards	Himself	Skateboarder
2006	2006 MTV Video Music Awards	Himself	Presenter
2006	Celebrity Paranormal Project	Himself	Episode 1.7
2007	The Bronx Bunny Show	Himself	Episode 1.9
2007	Armed and Famous	Himself	4 episodes
2007	Bam's Unholy Union	Himself	2 episodes
2007	Tom Green's House Tonight	Himself	2 episodes Guest appearance
2007	MTV's Scarred Live	Himself	Host, 1 episode
2008	Celebrity Circus	Himself	6 episodes
2008	Jackassworld.com: 24 Hour Takeover	Himself	TV special
2008	Entertainment Tonight	Himself	1 episode Guest appearance
2009	Steve-O: Demise and Rise	Himself	TV movie documentary
2009	Dancing with the Stars	Himself	4 episodes Audience member
2010	Maury	Himself	1 episode Guest appearance
2010	2010 MTV Video Music Awards	Himself	Presenter
2010	2010 MTV Europe Music Awards	Himself	Presenter
2010	The Tonight Show with Jay Leno	Himself	1 episode
2010	Made in Hollywood	Himself	Episode 6.04
2011	Attack of the Show!	Himself	1 episode Guest appearance
2011	A Tribute to Ryan Dunn	Himself	Documentary Film
2012	Punk'd	Himself	1 episode
2012–2014	Ridiculousness	Himself	2 episodes with Preston Lacy
2013–2014	Tanked	Himself	2 episodes
2017	Squidbillies	Himself	Episode 11.3
2022	Royal Rumble (2022)	Himself	Guest appearance
2022	WrestleMania 38	Himself	Johnny Knoxville's accomplice
2022	Jackass Shark Week 2.0	Himself	TV special
2022	Celebrity Family Feud	Himself	Participant; Episode 9.11
2023	History of the World, Part II	Russian	3 episodes

=== DVDs ===
Year	Film	Role	Notes
1996	shit	Himself	
2001	Don't Try This At Home – The Steve-O Video Vol. 1	Himself	Guest appearances
2002	Don't Try This At Home – The Steve-O Video Vol. 2: The Tour	Himself	Guest appearances
2003	Steve-O: Out on Bail	Himself	Guest appearances
2009	Jackass: The Lost Tapes	Himself	Writer, archived footage
2020	Steve-O: Gnarly	Himself	Guest appearances

=== Video games ===
Year	Title	Role	Notes
2004	Tony Hawk's Underground 2	Himself	Voice
2007	Jackass: The Game	Himself	Voice and motion capture
2016	Let It Die	Mr. Crowley	Voice

=== Music videos ===
Year	Artist	Track	Role	Notes
1996	Delinquent Habits	"Tres Delinquentes"	Himself	
2001	Shaquille O'Neal	"Psycho"	Himself	Unreleased
2002	CKY	"Flesh into Gear"	Himself	Archived footage
2002	Andrew W.K.	"We Want Fun"	Himself	
2003	Roger Alan Wade	"If You're Gonna Be Dumb, You Gotta Be Tough"	Himself	
2005	Jamiroquai	"Feels Just Like It Should"	Himself	
2006	Wolfmother	"Joker & the Thief"	Himself	
2006	Chris Pontius	"Karazy"	Himself	
2010	Weezer	"Memories"	Himself	

=== Web series ===
Year	Title	Role	Notes
2008	Hardly Working	Himself	1 episode: "Jackass"
2015	Jackass Reunion: 15 Year Later	Himself	Rolling Stone special
2019	Bathroom Break Podcast	Himself	GuestMbr>1 episode
2020	Battle Scars	Himself	1 episode
2020	Do A Kickflip!	Himself	1 episode
2020–2022	Steve-O's Wild Ride!	Himself	Guest; 2 episodes
2021	Truth or Dab	Himself	1 episode
2021–2022	The Nine Club	Himself	Guest; 2 episodes
2022	Wikipedia: Fact or Fiction?	Himself	1 episode
2026	Hot Ones: Wing Pong	Himself	1 episode
2026	Jackass: The Podcast	Himself	Guest; 1 episode
