= Rick Kosick =

American photographer and cinematographer (born 1967)

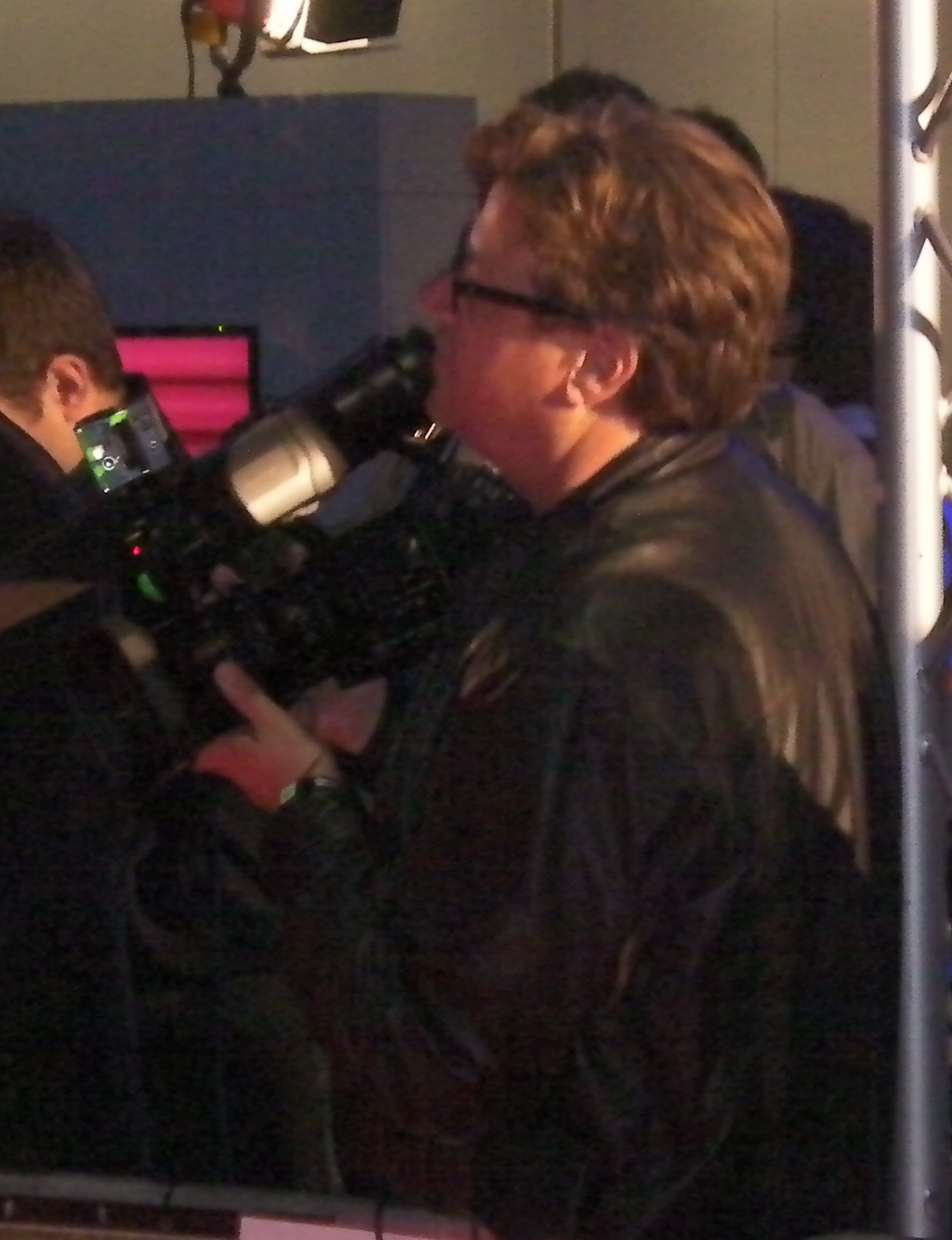
- Kosick at the Jackass 3D London premiere on November 2, 2010
- Born: May 25, 1967 (age 59); Oak Park, Illinois, U.S.
- Occupations: Photographer, cinematographer
- Known for: Jackass TV series and movies
- Website: rickkosickfilms.com

Rick Kosick (born May 25, 1967) is an American photographer and cinematographer. He is a crew member, and supporting cast member of the Jackass TV series and the five Jackass movies.

== Early career ==
Kosick started out as a freelance photographer for Poweredge and Slap skateboarding magazines and built up fame as a skateboard photographer. His photography also caught the attention of the alternative metal band Deftones who contracted Kosick to shoot the cover art to their album Around the Fur (1997). This cover was voted by Revolver magazine as one of the greatest heavy metal album covers ever. Kosick was later approached by the editor of Big Brother to become a photographer and later head photo editor. His work at Big Brother inspired other skate photographers. He also had involvement in the creation of the Big Brother video series. Kosick's likeness was featured on a skateboard for Birdhouse Skateboards on an Andrew Reynolds board.

== Jackass and follow-on projects ==
Following the end of Big Brother, Kosick worked as a freelance photographer until former Big Brother editor Jeff Tremaine approached him for a role in Tremaine's upcoming TV series Jackass. Kosick is often filmed being picked on by other Jackass crew members under the auspices of a legitimate stunt, usually only a ruse set up to tease Kosick. He usually didn't tolerate many of the pranks played against him. He was a camera operator for every single Jackass movie.

== Current projects ==
Kosick currently works as a freelance photographer and camera operator. He worked on Wildboyz, Nitro Circus and Rob and Big on MTV and MTV2. Kosick produced, directed, and edited Manny Puig's straight-to-DVD title, Ultimate Predator.

Kosick recently directed an electronic presskit video for the Los Angeles Band HDR and other music videos for Roger Alan Wade, Smut Peddlers, Lil Wyte with Three Six Mafia, House of Broken Promises and Scream for Me.

Kosick was a prominent member of the staff at Jackassworld.com as a content producer, and had his own online show 'jackass world live' (formerly known as The 4:20 Show with Rick Kosick), which also commonly features other staff members including Sean Cliver and Greg Wolf amongst others. The show was supposed to go live on Wednesdays at 4:20 pm PST, but was known for regularly being late (picking up the name 4:20ish Show from community members) and amongst other reasons, was why the show was renamed.

Kosick also worked behind the camera on Raab Himself's Bathroom Break podcast on YouTube.

== Filmography ==
=== Film ===
Year	Title	Role	Notes
1996	shit		Creator; Direct-to-video
1998	Number Two: Big Brother		Creator; Direct-to-video
1999	boob	Himself	Director of photography Direct-to-video
2001	crap	Himself	Director; Cinematographer; Direct-to-video
2001	Don't Try This at Home: The Steve-O Video		Additional editor Direct-to-video
2002	Jackass: The Movie	Himself	Camera operator
2006	Ultimate Predator		Director; Producer; Editor; Direct-to-video
2006	Jackass Number Two	Himself	Camera operator
2007	The Man Who Souled the World	Himself	Documentary
2007	Jackass 2.5	Himself	Camera operator
2008	Jackass Presents: Mat Hoffman's Tribute to Evel Knievel	Himself	Co-producer; Camera operator Direct-to-video
2009	Jackass: The Lost Tapes	Himself	Archive footage Camera operator Direct-to-video
2010	Jackass 3D	Himself	Writer; Camera operator
2011	Jackass 3.5	Himself	Writer; Camera operator
2013	Jackass Presents: Bad Grandpa	Himself (outtakes)	Camera operator
2014	Jackass Presents: Bad Grandpa .5	Himself	Camera operator
2017	Dumb: The Story of Big Brother Magazine	Himself	Documentary; Additional camera Associate producer
2020	Steve-O: Gnarly	Himself	Cameo; Camera operator Direct-to-video
2021	Bad Trip		Behind-the-scenes camera operator
2022	Jackass Forever	Himself	Writer; Camera operator Associate producer
2022	Jackass 4.5	Himself	Writer; Camera operator Associate producer
2026	Jackass: Best and Last	Himself	Writer; Camera operator Associate producer

=== Television ===
Year	Title	Role	Notes
	Jackass	Himself (18 episodes)	Camera operator
2002	Jackass Backyard BBQ	Himself	TV special Camera operator
	Wildboyz	Himself (4 episodes)	Camera operator
2008	Jackassworld.com: 24 Hour Takeover	Himself	TV special Camera operator
2009	Steve-O: Demise and Rise		TV documentary Camera operator
2009	Nitro Circus	Himself (1 episode)	Additional camera (3 episodes)
2011	A Tribute to Ryan Dunn	Himself	TV documentary Director of photography
2012	Punk'd		Camera operator (3 episodes)
	Loiter Squad		Camera operator (3 episodes); Additional camera (2 episodes)
	Ridiculousness		Photographer (44 episodes)
2015	Swerved		Camera operator (9 episodes)
	King of the Road		Camera operator (27 episodes)
2017	Party Legends		Camera operator (1 episode)
2022	Jackass Shark Week 2.0		TV special Camera operator

=== Web series ===
Year	Title	Role	Notes
	Bathroom Break Podcast	Himself (1 episode)	Camera operator (29 episodes)
	Jeremiah Wonders...	Himself	Guest; Podcast; 2 episodes
	The Nine Club	Himself	Guest; Podcast; 2 episodes
2023	The Pontius Show	Himself	Guest; Podcast; 1 episode
2026	Jackass: The Podcast	Himself	Guest; 2 episodes
2026	Let It Kill You: Jeff Tremaine	Himself	Documentary

=== Music videos ===
Year	Artist	Track	Role	Notes
2001	Smut Peddlers	"Let's Get Fucked Up"		Director
2002	Andrew W.K.	"We Want Fun"		Camera operator
2003	Roger Alan Wade	"If You're Gonna Be Dumb, You Gotta Be Tough"		Director
2006	Wolfmother	"Joker & the Thief"	Himself	Camera operator
2006	Chris Pontius	"Karazy"		Camera operator
2010	Weezer	"Memories"	Himself	Camera operator
