= Dave Carnie =

American magazine editor (born 1969)

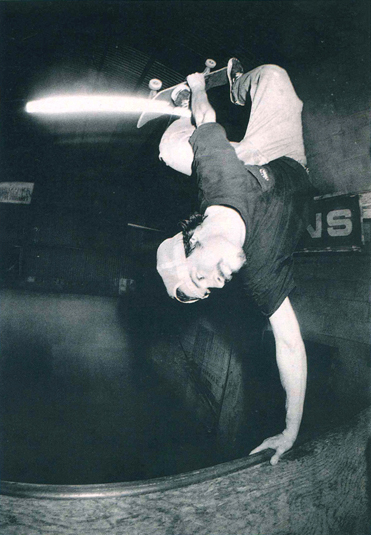
- Born: David Ross Carnie; December 14, 1969 (age 56)
- Occupations: Editor, writer, skateboarder
- Years active: 1996-present
- Website: davecarnie.com

David Ross Carnie (born December 14, 1969) is an American writer, magazine editor, and skateboarder. He is the former editor-in-chief of Big Brother and current writer for numerous publications.

== Writing career ==
Carnie writes freelance and has had articles published in Rolling Stone, Hustler, The Skateboard Mag, Snowboard Magazine, and Bizarre. Carnie also helped co-write a couple of short films with Spike Jonze (whom he met through fellow Big Brother editor Jeff Tremaine). Through his work on the Big Brother videos he was also one of the original creators of the television show Jackass and has appeared in numerous Jackass episodes. During his time at Big Brother Dave can be credited with launching the careers of numerous Jackass stars, including Johnny Knoxville, Steve-O, and Chris Pontius, and has brought fame to hundreds of skateboarding stars. Carnie was an editor of jackassworld.com. He also made a guest appearance in Jackass 3.5 (2011). Dave has a cat with no tail named Gary, that has become a recurring feature in his writings and interviews.

== Skateboarding involvement ==
Carnie was hailed for his work on exposing the dangers of the modular skateparks that many cities across the United States were installing, and was recognized by the Austin Public Skatepark Action Committee for his work. Dave also has his own brand of skateboard decks named Whalecock Skateboarding. Dave was a secret character on the PlayStation game Grind Session. His character farted while grinding.

== Filmography ==
=== Television ===
Year	Title	Role	Notes
2000-2001	Jackass	Himself	3 episodes Guest appearances
2008	Jackassworld.com: 24 Hour Takeover	Himself	TV special
2011	How the States Got Their Shapes	Himself	Episode 1.10
2017	Epicly Later'd: Bam Margera	Himself	TV documentary
2022	Epicly Later'd: Spike Jonze	Himself	TV documentary

=== Films ===
Year	Title	Role	Notes
2008	Jackass Presents: Mat Hoffman's Tribute to Evel Knievel	Himself	Direct-to-video; Guest appearances
2010	Jackass 3D		Writer
2011	Jackass 3.5	Himself	Writer; Guest appearance
2017	Dumb: The Story of Big Brother Magazine	Himself	Documentary; Associate producer

=== Videos ===
Year	Title	Role	Notes
1996	shit		Creator
1998	Number Two	Himself	Creator
1999	boob	Himself	Director; Creator
2001	Crap	Himself	Director; Creator
2001	Learn to Ride: A Skateboarding Instructional Video	Himself	
2003	AKA: Girl Skater	Himself	

== Video games ==
- Grind Session (2000)
