= Marc McKee =

American artist

Marc McKee is an American graphic artist known for his stylistic cartoon skateboard deck designs during the 1980s and 1990s. For his work as the lead graphic artist for World Industries, he is recognized as one of the most influential artists in skateboarding history.

== Biography ==
Marc McKee grew up in Marin County in Northern California.

Before Marc's Art career took off he was BMXer sponsored by Skyway BMX for riding flatland.He has a riding part in the poplular Dorkin' In York 3 video. Marc went on to do graphics for RL Osborn's company Bully in 1989 and met Steve Rocco through RL.

In 1989, McKee was discovered by Steve Rocco of World Industries and was hired on as designer. In that role, he created Devil Man, Flame Boy and Wet Willy as the brand's mascots. The mascots reached a larger audience in their use on apparel and the brand took off in the mid-1990s and was sold in 1998 for $29 million. While at World Industries, he was also an editor of Rocco's Big Brother magazine, of which he was a part owner. Like other World Industries art, McKee's work was recognized for its uncensored content and themes; something McKee has continued to further in his post-World-Industries career.

During the 1990s, McKee was also employed by Hustler magazine and published a number of his stylistic cartoons for a special "naughty" Christmas carols series.

In 2011, McKee exhibited a portion of his historical work during Milan Design Week.

== Bibliography ==
- The Art of Marc McKee, Winston Tseng, Marc McKee. Mark Batty Publisher, 2011.
