= 2003 MTV Movie Awards =

American awards show

- Date: Saturday, May 31, 2003
- Location: Shrine Auditorium, Los Angeles, California
- Country: United States
- Hosted by: Seann William Scott; Justin Timberlake

Television/radio coverage
- Network: MTV

The 2003 MTV Movie Awards aired on MTV on Saturday, May 31, 2003 at the Shrine Auditorium in Los Angeles, California. It was hosted by Seann William Scott and Justin Timberlake and featured performances by t.A.T.u., 50 Cent, and Pink. Colin Farrell was presented an award for Trans-Atlantic Breakthrough Performance by Victoria and David Beckham, although this award was not broadcast in the United States.

The show included a parody of The Matrix Reloaded, intercutting actual footage with new material from the hosts with appearances by Wanda Sykes as the Oracle and Will Ferrell as the Architect. The unedited version is featured in the DVD version of the film.

== Performers ==
- Pink — "Feel Good Time"
- 50 Cent — "In Da Club" / "Wanksta"
- t.A.T.u. — "All the Things She Said" / "Not Gonna Get Us"

== Presenters ==
- Hugh Jackman and Famke Janssen — presented Breakthrough Female
- Will Smith and Martin Lawrence — presented Best Comedic Performance
- Samuel L. Jackson and Colin Farrell — presented Best Fight
- Mark Wahlberg and Mýa — introduced Pink
- Queen Latifah and Adrien Brody — presented Best Kiss
- Jason Biggs and Alyson Hannigan — presented Best On-Screen Team
- Sharon Osbourne — introduced 50 Cent
- Beyoncé and Johnny Knoxville — presented Breakthrough Male
- Paul Walker and Tyrese Gibson – presented Best Action Sequence
- Roselyn Sánchez — introduced Ashton Kutcher and P. Diddy
- Ashton Kutcher and P. Diddy — presented Best Villain
- David and Victoria Beckham — presented Best Trans-Atlantic Performance (unaired)
- Kate Hudson and Luke Wilson — presented Best Virtual Performance
- Amanda Bynes and Hilary Duff — introduced t.A.T.u.
- Harrison Ford and Josh Hartnett — presented Best Female Performance
- Demi Moore — presented Best Male Performance
- Keanu Reeves — presented Best Movie

== Awards ==
Below are the list of nominations. Winners are listed at the top of each list in bold.

=== Best Movie ===
The Lord of the Rings: The Two Towers

- 8 Mile
- Barbershop
- The Ring
- Spider-Man

=== Best Male Performance ===
Eminem – 8 Mile

- Vin Diesel – XXX
- Leonardo DiCaprio – Catch Me If You Can
- Tobey Maguire – Spider-Man
- Viggo Mortensen – The Lord of the Rings: The Two Towers

=== Best Female Performance ===
Kirsten Dunst – Spider-Man

- Halle Berry – Die Another Day
- Kate Hudson – How To Lose A Guy In 10 Days
- Queen Latifah – Chicago
- Reese Witherspoon – Sweet Home Alabama

=== Breakthrough Male ===
Eminem – 8 Mile

- Nick Cannon – Drumline
- Kieran Culkin – Igby Goes Down
- Derek Luke – Antwone Fisher
- Ryan Reynolds – National Lampoon's Van Wilder

=== Breakthrough Female ===
Jennifer Garner – Daredevil

- Kate Bosworth – Blue Crush
- Maggie Gyllenhaal – Secretary
- Eve – Barbershop
- Beyoncé – Austin Powers in Goldmember
- Nia Vardalos – My Big Fat Greek Wedding

=== Best On-Screen Team ===
Elijah Wood, Sean Astin and Gollum – The Lord of the Rings: The Two Towers

- Will Ferrell, Vince Vaughn and Luke Wilson – Old School
- Kate Bosworth, Michelle Rodriguez and Sanoe Lake – Blue Crush
- Jackie Chan and Owen Wilson – Shanghai Knights
- Johnny Knoxville, Bam Margera, Steve-O and Chris Pontius – Jackass: The Movie

=== Best Villain ===
Daveigh Chase – The Ring

- Willem Dafoe – Spider-Man
- Daniel Day-Lewis – Gangs of New York
- Colin Farrell – Daredevil
- Mike Myers – Austin Powers in Goldmember

=== Best Comedic Performance ===
Mike Myers – Austin Powers in Goldmember

- Will Ferrell – Old School
- Cedric the Entertainer – Barbershop
- Johnny Knoxville – Jackass: The Movie
- Adam Sandler – Mr. Deeds

=== Best Virtual Performance ===
Gollum – The Lord of the Rings: The Two Towers (Note: When actor Andy Serkis (who played Gollum in the film) came up to the stage to accept his award, he gave a foul mouthed acceptance speech in character as Gollum that was so well received that it also later received an award of its own. The speech won the 2004 Hugo Award for Best Dramatic Presentation, Short Form.)

- Scooby-Doo – Scooby-Doo
- Kangaroo Jack – Kangaroo Jack
- Dobby – Harry Potter and the Chamber of Secrets
- Yoda – Star Wars: Episode II – Attack of the Clones

=== Best Trans-Atlantic Performance ===
Colin Farrell – Phone Booth

- Orlando Bloom – The Lord of the Rings: The Two Towers
- Keira Knightley – Bend It Like Beckham
- Jude Law – Road To Perdition
- Rosamund Pike – Die Another Day

=== Best Kiss ===
Tobey Maguire and Kirsten Dunst – Spider-Man

- Nick Cannon and Zoe Saldaña – Drumline
- Leonardo DiCaprio and Cameron Diaz – Gangs of New York
- Adam Sandler and Emily Watson – Punch-Drunk Love
- Jennifer Garner and Ben Affleck – Daredevil

=== Best Action Sequence ===
The Battle for Helms Deep – The Lord of the Rings: The Two Towers

- Collision on Highway 23 – Final Destination 2
- Collision on Jetpack – Minority Report
- The Arena Conflict – Star Wars: Episode II – Attack of the Clones

=== Best Fight ===
Yoda vs. Christopher Lee – Star Wars: Episode II – Attack of the Clones

- Jet Li vs. The Ultimate Fighters – Cradle 2 the Grave
- Johnny Knoxville vs. Butterbean – Jackass: The Movie
- Fann Wong vs. The Palace Intruders – Shanghai Knights

=== Films with multiple nominations and awards ===
Films with multiple nominations
Nominations	Film
6	The Lord of the Rings: The Two Towers
5	Spider-Man
3	8 Mile
3	Austin Powers in Goldmember
3	Barbershop
3	Daredevil
3	Jackass: The Movie
3	Star Wars: Episode II – Attack of the Clones
2	Blue Crush
2	Die Another Day
2	Drumline
2	Gangs of New York
2	Old School
2	Shanghai Knights
2	The Ring

Films with multiple awards
Awards	Film
4	The Lord of the Rings: The Two Towers
2	Spider-Man
2	8 Mile
