= Elf-Man =

2012 film by Ethan Wiley

- Directed by: Ethan Wiley
- Written by: Ethan Wiley; Richard Jefferies
- Produced by: Richard Jefferies
- Starring: Jason Acuña; Jeffrey Combs; Mackenzie Astin; Mirelly Taylor; Marty Terry; Dave Coyne; Larry Nichols; Carly Robell; Blake Kaiser
- Music by: Joseph Bauer
- Production companies: Elf-Man LLC; Wiseacre Films LLC
- Distributed by: Vision Films; Anchor Bay Entertainment
- Release date: November 15, 2012
- Running time: 86 minutes
- Country: United States
- Language: English

Elf-Man is a direct-to-video Christmas superhero comedy film starring Jason Acuña as the title character. It is distributed by Anchor Bay Entertainment and was released in United States, the United Kingdom, Australia and New Zealand on December 4, 2012. Worldwide sales by Vision Films.

== Plot ==
When Santa Claus leaves an elf behind on Christmas Eve, the Harper kids help him realize that he's the super-hero Elf-Man. Together they must save their Dad's new invention from a bumbling gang of thieves, and enjoy the best Christmas ever.

== Cast ==
- Jason "Wee Man" Acuña as Elf-Man
- Jeffrey Combs as Mickey
- Mackenzie Astin as Eric
- Mirelly Taylor as Amy
- Carly Robell as Kasey
- Blake Kaiser as Ryan
- Marty Terry as Grandma
- Dave Coyne as Jean-Pierre
- Larry Nichols as Big Bucket

== Reception ==
Tracy Moore of Common Sense Media gave the film 2 out of 5 stars, calling it a "poor man's Home Alone" and "a watered-down version of the many better adventures that have come before it".

== See also ==
- List of Christmas films
