= Anthony Shetler =

American skateboarder (born 1982)

Anthony Joseph Shetler (born November 15, 1982) is a professional skateboarder who, as of July 2019, is pro for World Industries and is the owner of All I Need Skateboards.

== Early life ==
Shetler was born in Brockton, Massachusetts, to Lisa Marie Oliver and Elwood Reginald Shetler. He started skateboarding in Raymond, New Hampshire with his friend Dale Raymond. He then moved back to Massachusetts, where he would develop a deep relationship with the skateshop Solstice, who helped him get his first sponsorship with 5boro Skateboards.

== Coverage ==
Shetler has appeared in numerous skateboard magazines, including Focus, Skateboarder, Transworld Skateboarding, Thrasher, and others. He now owns a skateboard apparel company, All I Need. He partnered up with 88 Eyewear in fall of 2013 to make a limited edition line of sunglasses.

A wide variety of online magazines, stores, skateshops, and skate companies host interviews and photos of Shetler: Alli Sports, Skatepark of Tampa, SkateboardREV, and True Skateboard Magazine, and ESPN.

An interview with Shetler aired on the action sports channel FuelTV.

== Sponsors (2011) ==
- FKD Bearings Pro Team
- World Industries
- Solstice Skateshop
- Thunder Trucks
- Spitfire Wheels
- Project Hardware
- All I Need Apparel[

== Video parts ==
- EZ Pass Vacation (2002)
- Surviving the Times (2008)
- All I Need (2008)
- State of Mind (2009)
- It's Your World (2011)

== Video game appearances ==
Shetler is mentioned in the video game Tony Hawk's Project 8.
