= Smut Peddlers =

American punk band

- Origin: Redondo Beach, California, U.S.
- Genres: Punk rock
- Years active: 1993–present
- Labels: TKO, Ransom, Hostage
- Members: John Ransom; Gish Thornton; Julia Smut; Prospect; Chuk Davis

Smut Peddlers are an American punk band originally from Redondo Beach, California. The band has been performing live since 1993 and has toured in Europe and North America. The Smut Peddlers are notorious in Southern California for their spirited and rowdy live shows.

== History ==
The band was formed in Redondo Beach in April 1993. They played regularly in Orange County in the early 2000s.

In 1995, Smut Peddlers released their first album, Failure on the band's own label Ransom Records. The follow-up Freedom was released in 1997. Their third full-length album Tarball 2000 was released on Ransom Records in 1999. ISM is their fourth full-length album, released in 2001. Their fifth album, Coming Out, was released in 2004 on the independent label, TKO Records. A live DVD/CD of the band titled That's Amore was released by TKO Records in 2005.

The band's music was featured in Big Brother magazine's 1996 skateboarding video. They were also featured on the 2002 soundtrack to Jackass: The Movie and the 2006 soundtrack to Jackass Number Two. In addition, the band's music has been featured on several episodes of the television shows Jackass, Wildboyz, and Rob and Big. The band also contributed two songs to the Jackass video game.

The band toured Europe in August 2002, playing 16 cities throughout Germany, Switzerland, the Netherlands, and Belgium, headlining all shows except three. Smut Peddlers also toured the United States in May/June 2005, though a European tour that year was canceled after John Ransom made right-wing statements to Thrasher magazine.

The band released a new album for the first time in ten years titled Going In on July 12, 2014, on their own label, Ransom Records. On June 30, in support of the new album, Smut Peddlers released a video of the song "California Gold" on YouTube.

== Band members ==
=== Current ===
- John Ransom – vocals
- Gish Thornton – bass
- Julia Smut – drums
- Prospect – guitar
- Chuk Davis – guitar

=== Past ===
- Mike Angulo (deceased) – guitar (1992–1996)
- Doug Winbury – guitar (1992–2001)
- Kristian Dragge (deceased) – guitar (1996)
- Kevin Sullivan – guitar (1996)
- Bert Orlando – guitar (1998–1999)
- Roger Ramjet – guitar (1999–2003)
- Sean Mallard – guitar (2002–2007)
- John Kraft – Drums (1998–2009)

== Discography ==
=== Albums ===
- "The Demos" (1993–1994)
- Failure (1995)
- Freedom (1997)
- Tarball 2000 (1999)
- ISM (2001)
- Coming Out (2004)
- 1993–1994: The Demos (2007)
- Going In (2014)
- High Anxiety Stress Fear (2018)

=== 7-inches ===
- "Live at the Hermosa Saloon" (1998)
- "Silicone & STP" (1999)
- "Bipolar Girl" (2000)
- "Exit Plan" (2004)

=== 10-inches ===
- "Ten Inch" (2003)
