= Lisa Howarth =

British kickboxer

- Born: February 1974 (age 52); Sale, Greater Manchester, England, United Kingdom
- Other names: Lisa M. Ditcheva
- Nationality: United Kingdom
- Height: 1.67 m (5 ft 6 in)
- Weight: 52 kg (114 lb; 8.14 st)
- Division: Flyweight, Bantamweight, Super flyweight, Super bantamweight
- Reach: 66 in (167 cm)
- Style: Muay Thai, Kickboxing, Karate
- Fighting out of: Sale, Cheshire, Greater Manchester, England Samrong Nuea, Mueang Samut Prakan district, Samut Prakan, Thailand
- Team: Northern Spirits Muaythai, Master Toddy’s Academy
- Teacher: Master Toddy

Professional boxing record
- Total: 1
- Losses: 1

Kickboxing record
- Total: 26
- Wins: 19
- Losses: 3
- Draws: 3
- No contests: 1

Other information
- Notable relatives: Dakota Ditcheva (daughter)
- Boxing record from BoxRec

Lisa Howarth (born February 1974) is a British former professional kickboxer, and Muay thai practitioner. She is a multiple-time kickboxing and Muay thai world champion, in which she is a two-time World Kickboxing Association super flyweight champion, while also being the promotion’s super bantamweight Muay Thai world champion. She is also a former professional boxer, and a karateka, representing Great Britain, and becoming a Full contact karate world champion in 1993.

== Personal life ==
Lisa was first exposed to martial arts at Thai boxing around 6, with her first professional appearance at age 9 at a competition in the Netherlands, while also starting to practice Judo at age 11, and along started learning Kickboxing around 13, having her first professional fight at 13. She also practiced full contact karate as a teen, becoming a world champion at the age of 19. She is an instructor of Muay Thai and Kickboxing, being the head coach of Northern Spirits Muaythai, a Muay thai and kickboxing gym in Sale, Cheshire, Greater Manchester, and a gym that she formally used to fight out of. She was also an avid fan of football, playing for local clubs as a young child while learning martial arts on the side.

Lisa Howarth's daughter Dakota Ditcheva is a professional MMA fighter.

== Titles ==
- 1997 - WPKL Women’s Super Flyweight World Title
- 1995 – WKA Super Bantamweight Muay Thai World Title
- 1993 – Full Contact Karate World Title
- 1993 - ISKA Women’s Bantamweight World Title
- 1987 – IFCF Bantamweight World Title
- 1987 – WKA Super Flyweight World Title (2 reigns, 1 defence)

== Kickboxing record ==
Kickboxing record (incomplete)
19 wins (? KOs), 3 losses, 3 draws, 1 NC
| Date | Result | Opponent | Event | Location | Method | Round | Time | Record |
| 2001-11-04 | Draw | (Netherlands) Ilonka Elmont | | Amsterdam, Netherlands | Draw | | | |
WPKL Super Flyweight World title.
| 1997-06-19 | Win | (Canada) Chantal Nadon | | Toronto, Ontario, Canada | Decision | 6 | | |
| 1995-05-30 | Loss | (Japan) Naoko Kumagai | | Tokyo, Japan | KO | 1 | | |
WKA Super Bantamweight World title.
| 1994-06-03 | Win | (Canada) Nora Daigle | | Atlantic City, New Jersey, USA | KO | 1 | | |
| 1994-02-04 | Draw | (United States) Bonnie Canino | | USA | Draw | | | |
| 1993-11-12 | Loss | (France) Nancy Joseph | | Milan, Italy | Points | 10 | 2:00 | |
ISKA Bantamweight World title.
| 1993-10-22 | Win | (United States) Bonnie Canino | | Atlantic City, New Jersey, USA | Points | 10 | 2:00 | |
| 1992-08-00 | Win | (Belgium) Zelda Tekin | | Belgium | KO | 5 | | |
ITBF World title.
| 1991-04-21 | Draw | (United Kingdom) Michele Aboro | | London, England | Draw | | | |
| 1991-00-00 | NC | (Japan) Naoko Kumagai | | Birmingham, England | No Contest | | | |
| 1990-03-24 | Win | (France) Florence Suire | | Oldham, England | Points | | | |
| 1990-02-03 | Win | (United States) Kathy Long | | London, England | Points | 3 | 3:00 | |
| 1987-00-00 | Win | (Netherlands) Yolanda Mol | | England | Points | 3 | | |
WKA Super Flyweight World title. IFCF Bantamweight World title.
| 1987-07-12 | Win | (Netherlands) Claudia | | Manchester, England | TKO | 3 | | |
| 1986-11-23 | Win | (Canada) Dayle Baykey | | London, England | Points | 7 | 2:00 | |
WKA Super Flyweight World title.
| 1986-00-00 | Win | (France) Cathy Paschy | | London, England | Points | | | |
| 1986-00-00 | Win | (Netherlands) Sandra De Vries | | | | | | |
Legend: Win Loss Draw/No contest Notes

== Professional boxing record ==
| 1 fight | 0 wins | 1 loss |
|---|---|---|
| By decision | 0 | 1 |

| No. | Result | Record | Opponent | Type | Round, time | Date | Location | Notes |
|---|---|---|---|---|---|---|---|---|
| 1 | Loss | 0–1 | (Jamaica) Alicia Ashley | SD | 6 | 29 Jan 1999 | (United States) Atlantic City, New Jersey | Professional debut |
