= Patrick O'Dell =

American skateboarder, filmmaker, and photographer

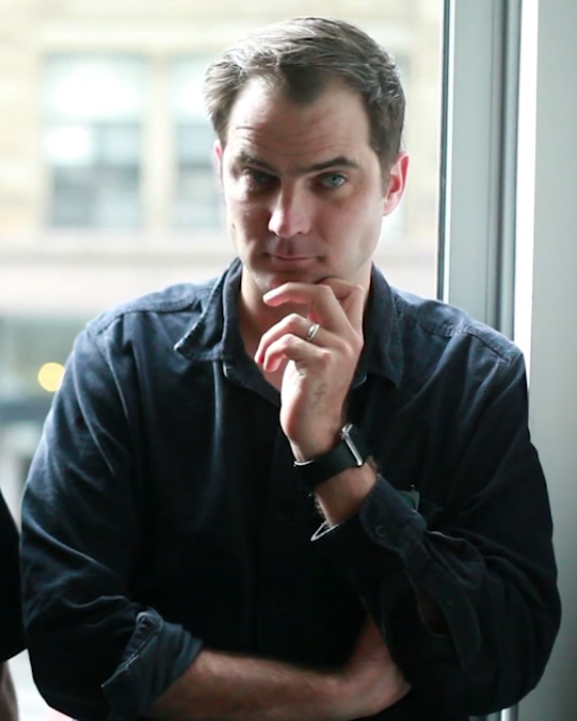
- O'Dell in 2017
- Born: St. Louis, Missouri, U.S.
- Occupations: photographer, filmmaker

Patrick O'Dell is an American photographer, filmmaker, skateboarder, and skateboard journalist from Columbus, Ohio.

== Career ==
=== Epicly Later'd ===
In 2004 O'Dell started Epicly Later’d, one of the first skate-related blogs. Epicly Later'd evolved into a web-series and television show where O'Dell conducts long-form interviews of skateboarders.

=== Dumb: The Story of Big Brother Magazine ===
O'Dell directed Dumb: The Story of Big Brother Magazine, an American documentary film that premiered on Hulu on June 3, 2017. The film explores the rise and fall of skateboarding magazine Big Brother.

=== Music videos ===
In 2008, O'Dell directed All You Need Is Me by Morrissey. In 2010, O'Dell directed the Wavves music video "Post Acid" starring Kevin Long as a skateboarding alien. In 2013, O'Dell directed I Don't Know How by Best Coast.
