= Naoko Kumagai =

Japanese kickboxer (born 1971)

- Born: Kumagai Naoko; August 8, 1971 (age 55); Yamanashi, Japan
- Height: 1.57 m (5 ft 2 in)
- Weight: 115 lb (52 kg; 8.2 st)
- Style: Kickboxing
- Stance: Southpaw
- Fighting out of: Tokyo, Japan
- Team: Fudohkan Gym
- Trainer: Shinya Natori
- Years active: 1989–2002

Professional boxing record
- Total: 3
- Wins: 1
- Losses: 2

Kickboxing record
- Total: 37
- Wins: 31
- By knockout: 27
- Losses: 4
- Draws: 1
- No contests: 1

Other information
- Boxing record from BoxRec

Naoko Kumagai (born 8 August 1971) is a Japanese female kickboxer and 3-time World Champion in three different weight classes. She also had two amateur boxing matches with Russian Elena Karpachova, and one pro boxing match.

Kumagai is known for her knockout punch and high KO percentage. Her kickboxing record is 31 wins (27 KO), 4 losses and 2 draws.

== Notable fights ==
Pro debut loss to WKA world champion Ella Yee of the United Kingdom; Kumagai defeated German kickboxing champion, Regina Halmich, by first-round KO; A five-round decision victory over ISKA world kickboxing champion, Kim "Fireball" Messer of the USA;

A First round KO victory over Japan's Natsumi Nakazawa; two fights with Australian star, Amanda Buchanan; the first fight with Buchanan was a five-round decision loss to Buchanan for the WKA World Title and the rematch with Buchanan was a 4th-round KO victory for Kumagai over Buchanan as Kumagai regained her WKA world title from Buchanan.

Kumagai VS WKA World Champion, Lisa Howarth, 2 fights: The first fight with Lisa Howarth in Manchester, England, was ruled a no contest by the WKA.

The 2nd fight with Lisa Howarth in Tokyo was a first-round KO Kumagai victory for the WKA World flyweight Title;

Kumagai vs Kyoko Miyazake aka Kamikaze was a fourth round TKO victory for her world title defense.

Kickboxing decision win over MMA star, Yoko Takahashi.

Draw vs Australian star, Holly Ferneley, in a five-round Muay Thai fight.

Draw vs shootboxing champion, Terumi Fujiyama, in a shoot boxing fight. One exhibition fight against world champion, Sachiyo Shibata(no decision was rendered in this "exhibition fight")

== Titles ==
- Double-K World Women's Lightweight Champion
- WKA World Flyweight and Bantamweight Title
- UKF World Super Bantamweight Title

== Media career ==
She appeared in Jackass: The Movie segment "Ass Kicked by Girl" beating up Ryan Dunn in a kickboxing session.
