= Chris Nieratko =

American writer and editor

- Occupations: Humorist, author, editor
- Years active: 1996–present
- Website: njskateshop.com

Chris Nieratko is an American humorist and author. Nieratko is a past editor of Big Brother magazine, and currently reviews pornographic films for Vice magazine, as well as being the author of the related Skinema book. He also appeared in 2 episodes of MTV's Jackass in 2000, and in the 2017 documentary titled Dumb: The Story of Big Brother Magazine. He made an appearance in Bam Margera's episode of the TV documentary Epicly Later'd, which aired on Vice in 2017. He has his own skateshop in Jersey City, New Jersey.
