= Dumb: The Story of Big Brother Magazine =

2017 American documentary film

- Directed by: Patrick O'Dell
- Based on: Big Brother by Steve Rocco
- Produced by: Sean Cliver
- Starring: Bam Margera; Steve-O; Johnny Knoxville; Spike Jonze; Jeff Tremaine; Tony Hawk; Rob Dyrdek; Dave Carnie; Chris Nieratko; Chad Muska; Jonah Hill; Gavin McInnes; Heather Dixon; Andy Roy; Steve Rocco; Ronnie James Dio; Larry Flynt
- Edited by: Seth Casriel
- Music by: Brendan Canty
- Production company: Gorilla Flicks
- Distributed by: Hulu
- Release date: June 3, 2017
- Running time: 79 minutes
- Country: United States
- Language: English

Dumb: The Story of Big Brother Magazine is an American documentary film that premiered on Hulu on June 3, 2017. Directed by Patrick O'Dell, it explores the rise and fall of the skateboarding magazine Big Brother.

== Synopsis ==
"A look at the rise and fall of the subversive skateboarding magazine Big Brother, which rose to prominence in the mid-1990s and had a profound effect on the skating subculture with its unfiltered approach."

== Premise and persons featured ==
The documentary chronicles the origin, creation, controversies, decline, cancellation and eventual legacy and friendships developed in the publication of the skateboard magazine Big Brother by tracking its evolution from a printed publication into home video releases and its eventual evolution into more successful fringe skateboard culture endeavors like CKY, Jackass, Ridiculousness and other TV and movie endeavors that continue being made. It features interviews from creators and editors Spike Jonze and Jeff Tremaine; prominent skateboarders Tony Hawk, Rob Dyrdek and Natas Kaupas; former subscribers and media personalities attracted to the magazine Jason Lee, Jonah Hill and Gavin McInnes; and related skate culture personalities Bam Margera, Steve-O and Johnny Knoxville.

== Reception ==
Dumb: The Story of Big Brother Magazine has received positive reviews from critics. On Rotten Tomatoes, it holds a 100% approval rating with an average rating of 6.3 out of 10 based on five reviews.

== See also ==
- List of original programs distributed by Hulu
