= World Industries =

American skateboarding company

World Industries, Inc.
- Type: Private
- Founded: March 1989
- Founders: Steve Rocco, Jesse Martinez, Rodney Mullen, Mike Vallely
- Headquarters: Santa Monica, California, U.S., United States
- Key people: Rodney Mullen, Steve Rocco, Mike Vallely, Frank Messmann, Scott Drouillard, Marc McKee
- Products: Skateboarding equipment, action figures, clothing, shoes, accessories, videos; snowboards, outerwear, etc.
- Owner: INA Sports Inc. & FGL Sports Ltd.
- Parent: GVS America
- Website: worldindustries.com

World Industries is an American brand that offers skateboarding products, accessories and clothing. The company was founded by Steve Rocco in 1989. Later that year, Rocco was joined by skater, Rodney Mullen, and then Mike Vallely. As of 2014, World Industries operates under GVS America, a subsidiary of INA Sports Inc. & FGL Sports Ltd. The company also makes and sells longboards.

The company was initially known for its cavalier attitude through its marketing and handling of their team riders, most notably through their use of attack ads mocking rival skate companies as well as board designs that are either deemed offensive or bordering towards copyright infringement, with which they simply brush off any cease-and-desist letters they receive from companies such as Disney and the Church of Scientology among others.

== History ==
=== Blind ===
In late-1989, Mark Gonzales approached Rocco with the desire to be involved in his own company. Gonzales was riding for Vision, which was one of the top 3 skateboard companies in the world at the time, alongside Santa Cruz and Powell Peralta. Gonzales and Rocco decided to name the company Blind, in contrast to Gonzales' former sponsor. Jason Lee, who was, at the time, a World Industries team member, assisted with the development of the brand.

=== Plan B ===
In 1991, wanting to break from H-Street, co-founder Mike Ternasky formed the company Plan B with an exclusive production and distribution alliance with World Industries. In the deal, Plan B marketed itself from San Diego while World Industries did the rest, paying a royalty fee to Plan B. Mike Ternasky was able to convince perennial freestyle world champion Rodney Mullen to switch to street skating thus becoming a member of the Plan B team.

In September 1993, Rick Howard defected with seven other riders from the fold of World Industries and started Girl. Mike Ternasky was killed in a car accident in 1994. Plan B and World Industries parted ways in 1997, and was run by Danny Way and Colin McKay, closing its doors shortly thereafter in 1998. In March 2005, Plan B was resurrected by team member and part-owner, Danny Way.

=== Restructure and growth ===
The years of 1996 to 1999 were years of significant restructuring and explosive growth for the company, led by the newly appointed executives, and subsequent shareholders, CEO Frank Messman and CFO Scott Drouillard. By the end of 1998, World Industries and Blind had achieved the status of number one and number two brands in skateboard hardgoods. This was in large part due to the re-positioning of the brands with Marc McKee's hugely popular cartoon characters of Devil Man, Flame Boy and Wet Willy for World Industries, and the "Blind Reaper" for Blind.

=== Kubic Marketing ===
In October 1998, Steve Rocco and his then five other shareholder partners (including Rodney Mullen, Frank Messmann, and Scott Drouillard), sold a 70% majority interest of the company to an outside private equity group, SPC, while maintaining all key management and employees. The company was valued at $29 million at the point of sale. A parent company emerged by the name of Kubic Marketing ("Kubic") which owned World Industries and Dwindle Distribution.

In 1999, the parent company Kubic bought the then-largest retailer (catalog and internet) CCS in the skateboard industry for $21 million. In 2000, due to financial issues, the company sold CCS to Alloy, a publicly listed company for approximately $50 million.

=== Globe International ===
In 2002, Globe International Limited, an Australian public company, purchased all companies of Kubic, including World Industries.

=== i.e. Distribution ===
On June 25, 2007, Globe International Limited sold the World Industries brand to i.e. Distribution.

As of February 2014, World Industries continues to sponsor a team of skateboarders; however, an official promotional flyer appeared on February 6, 2014, following the addition of a skateboard deck line to team rider Anthony Shetler's clothing brand "All I Need" (AIN). The flyer states: "Shetler and Timmy Knuth will have pro models," but as of February 20, 2014, both Shetler and Knuth remain on the World Industries website as team members, and no further information has been released.

=== Golden Viking Sports ===
On August 10, 2014, World Industries was purchased by GVS America, a subsidiary that is wholly owned by INA Sports Inc. & FGL Sports Ltd. Financial details of the purchase were not disclosed to the public.

== Team ==
- Andrew Cannon
- Anthony Shetler
- Timmy Knuth
- Derek Fukuhara
- Matt Mendenhall
- Mike Franklin
- Cary Ford
- Billy Davenport

== The Man Who Souled the World ==
In 2007, Whyte House Productions released The Man Who Souled the World, a documentary about Steve Rocco and the creation of World Industries, as well as his other skateboard related companies and ventures. The film release was accompanied by a skateboard art exhibition (featuring Marc McKee's art) titled, "Censorship is Weak as F##k."
