= Jackass: The Movie =

2002 American reality comedy film

- Theatrical release poster
- Directed by: Jeff Tremaine
- Based on: Jackass by Johnny Knoxville; Spike Jonze; Jeff Tremaine
- Produced by: Jeff Tremaine; Spike Jonze; Johnny Knoxville
- Starring: Johnny Knoxville; Bam Margera; Chris Pontius; Steve-O; Dave England; Ryan Dunn; Wee Man; Preston Lacy; Danger Ehren
- Cinematography: Dimitry Elyashkevich
- Edited by: Liz Ewart; Mark Hansen; Kristine Young
- Music by: Sam Spiegel
- Production companies: Dickhouse Productions; Lynch Siderow Productions
- Distributed by: Paramount Pictures; MTV Films
- Release date: October 25, 2002 (United States)
- Running time: 85 minutes
- Country: United States
- Language: English
- Budget: $5 million
- Box office: $79.5 million

Jackass: The Movie is a 2002 American reality slapstick comedy film directed by Jeff Tremaine, and produced by Tremaine, Spike Jonze, and Johnny Knoxville. It is a continuation of the MTV television series Jackass, which had completed its run. It was produced by Lynch Siderow Productions and Dickhouse Productions. The film features most of the original Jackass cast, including Knoxville, Bam Margera, Chris Pontius, Steve-O, Dave England, Ryan Dunn, Wee Man, Preston Lacy and Danger Ehren.

MTV Films and Paramount Pictures released the film to theaters on October 25, 2002. It grossed $79.5 million worldwide, but received mixed reviews from critics. The film is widely regarded as a 2000s cult phenomenon. It was followed by a sequel, Jackass Number Two (2006).

== Plot ==
Jackass: The Movie is a compilation of stunts, skits, and pranks, intercut with on-set talking heads with its cast. The movie begins with an over-the-top, Hollywood parody set to "O Fortuna", featuring the entire main cast riding a giant shopping cart downhill amidst huge explosions, as each cast member is individually introduced to the audience. Towards the end of the scene, Johnny Knoxville delivers his iconic intro line, "Hi, I'm Johnny Knoxville! Welcome to Jackass!" Immediately after, the guys crash into a fruit stand, launching them into the fruit.

Many stunts take place throughout the duration of the film. However, the most notable stunts and pranks include: Johnny Knoxville getting flipped over, and subsequently being knocked out, in a golf cart; Steve-O snorting wasabi mixed with soy sauce; Bam Margera pranking his mother April by planting a live alligator in her kitchen; Chris Pontius dancing in public as his character "Party Boy" while wearing nothing but a thong; Ryan Dunn fighting against female Japanese kickboxing champion Naoko Kumagai; Ehren McGhehey eating a snow cone made from his own urine; Wee Man wreaking havoc around Japan in a giant traffic cone; Preston Lacy sitting on a bench which is rigged to collapse, thus ripping his pants and exposing his buttocks to unsuspecting bystanders; and Dave England defecating in a display toilet at a hardware store after uncontrollably defecating in his pants in a van.

The final stunt involves a toy car being inserted into Ryan Dunn’s anus in order to have it shown in an x-ray. Steve-O was originally set to do the stunt, but was told beforehand by his father that he would be disowned had he gone through with it. The end result is successful, as the toy car appears once the x-ray has been taken. The car is later seen being defecated out in the end credits. This is followed by a scene of Johnny Knoxville being launched into a lake via catapult (The end result of a failed Rube Goldberg test), where comedian Rip Taylor closes the film.

== Cast ==
The main cast from the TV show that returned for the movie.

- Johnny Knoxville
- Bam Margera
- Ryan Dunn
- Steve-O
- Jason "Wee Man" Acuña
- Chris Pontius
- Preston Lacy
- Dave England
- "Danger Ehren" McGhehey

=== Guest appearances ===
- Loomis Fall
- Brandon DiCamillo
- Chris "Raab Himself" Raab
- Rake Yohn
- April Margera, Phil Margera and Jess Margera
- Stephanie Hodge
- Mike Kassak
- Jason "J2" Rasmus
- Manny Puig
- Rip Taylor
- Tony Hawk
- Clyde Singleton
- Eric Koston
- Mat Hoffman
- Naoko Kumagai
- Butterbean
- Henry Rollins

=== Crew ===
Crew members who appear in this movie:

- Director and producer Jeff Tremaine
- Producer Spike Jonze
- Executive producer Trip Taylor
- Co-executive producer Michelle Klepper
- Co-producer and cinematographer Dimitry Elyashkevich
- Co-producer and photographer Sean Cliver
- Cameramen Lance Bangs, Rick Kosick, Greg "Guch" Iguchi, Rob "Whitey" McConnaughy, Knate Lee and Mark Rackley
- Photographer Ben "Benzo" Kaller

== Production ==
After the success and popularity of the Jackass TV series, Johnny Knoxville was approached by the producers to make the show into a feature film. Initially, he rejected the idea as he did not understand the concept, thinking the production company would get Hollywood actors to portray the cast. He later agreed when both Jeff Tremaine and Spike Jonze explained it would be a "naughtier version" of the TV series.

Bits that were filmed, but were ultimately cut from the theatrical and home media releases include Gene LeBell choking the cast out one by one; Ryan Dunn getting sprayed by bear mace in the face by Bam Margera; Wee Man skating while being dressed as a penis; Preston Lacy getting "fat fuck" trimmed in his hair by cinematographer Dimitry Elyashkevich with hair clippers; Dave England posing as a caricature sketch artist to draw inappropriate drawings; Steve-O pouring beer in his anus with a garden hose (which was later retooled and redone in Jackass Number Two as the "Butt Chug"); Chris Pontius and Dave England putting a bicycle lock around a crew member's neck; and Ehren McGhehey, Ryan Dunn, Chris Pontius, and Mat Hoffman wakeboarding with BMXs attached to the wakeboards. Some of these deleted bits are briefly shown in the credits or the making of Jackass: The Movie. Dave England uploaded the caricature sketch artist bit on his YouTube channel, but it was removed for violating the community guidelines. He then re-posted it on his personal website.

The original plan for the "Butt X-Ray" stunt was for someone to insert a cellphone up their anus and then receive a call, but it was later changed to a toy car. A scene that was planned but never got filmed due to financial reasons was a stunt in which Chris Pontius would dress up as the devil and go to a Pentecostal church where they handle live snakes.

=== "Failed ending" ===
The original ending for the film was supposed to be a Rube Goldberg-type contraption, with each of the cast members performing a stunt that either has something to do with what they did on the show (for example, the first stunt would have Preston Lacy as "The Human Wrecking Ball", knocking him into a Port-A-Potty), or simply for a sight gag (such as Ehren McGhehey being knocked over in the Port-A-Potty and landing on a bed of toilet paper rolls), ending with Johnny Knoxville being launched off the catapult next to Rip Taylor.

However, as the entire contraption didn't work together the way the cast and crew intended, the producers of the film instead decided on filming an alternate ending, which is how the "Son of Jackass" skit came to be. "Son of Jackass" (which, according to the skit, is set in the year 2063) starts after the end credits, as Knoxville and Taylor return to the edge of the lake, and Taylor whispers the suggestion into Knoxville's ear. The skit involves all of the performers in "old man" costumes running around in exploding buildings and sheds, as well as other hazards, only Steve-O surviving to proclaim "Yeah, dude!". In the cast commentary, it is said that this is ironic as Steve-O is the least likely to even reach old age. Some bits of the failed ending were incorporated into the end credits montage, like Dave England dressed in a penis costume and Wee Man going down the giant Plinko contraption.

== Home media ==
The film was released on DVD on March 25, 2003. The DVD includes 27 minutes of additional footage, outtakes and MTV's The Making of Jackass: The Movie. An unrated version of the film was released in 2006, with a runtime of 87 minutes, including some extended scenes that were shortened in the theatrical version of the movie.

== Reception ==
=== Box office ===
The film had a budget of $5 million and was the number one film at the United States box office when it opened, grossing $22.8 million, revenue from 2,509 theaters, for an average of $9,073 per venue. The film fell to fourth place in its second weekend and dropped 44 percent to $12.7 million, expanding to 2,530 theaters and averaging $5,032 per theater. The ten day gross was $42.1 million. The film went on to gross $64.3 million in the United States alone, of which the opening weekend made up 35.43 percent of its final gross. It made $15.2 million in other countries, bringing the worldwide gross to $79.5 million.

=== Critical response ===
On Rotten Tomatoes, 49% of critics gave the film positive reviews based on 92 reviews, with an average rating of 5/10. The website's critics consensus reads, "There's a good chance you'll be laughing hysterically at one stunt, but getting grossed out by the next one in this big screen version of the controversial MTV show." On Metacritic, the film has an average score of 42 out of 100 based on 14 critics, indicating "mixed or average" reviews. Audiences polled by CinemaScore gave the film an average grade of "A−" on an A+ to F scale.

Talking on Ebert & Roeper, Richard Roeper called it the "feel-sick movie of the year" and said the film is "a disgusting, repulsive, grotesque spectacle, but it's also hilarious and provocative. God help me, thumbs up." Roger Ebert gave the film a low rating, but only barely, explaining his rating comes "somewhere between a thumbs down and a sort of 'waving over' recommendation". The Austin Chronicle's Kimberly Jones gave the film 3 stars and said it is the "feature-length rendering of jackass the MTV show, meaning no plot, no script, just wall-to-wall idiocy." Jones said "It's silly, often stomach-churning, but also awfully addictive, inspiring the same kind of vicarious adrenaline rush as Fight Club, with its 'I bleed, therefore I am'; he-man mentality." Jones also remarked, "Consisting of a steady clip of barely minutes-long gags...this piece of outré performance art defies typical movie conventions..." Chicago Tribune film reporter Mark Caro gave the film 1 star out of 4 and called it "willful idiocy for idiocy's sake." Caro also said "there's one stunt that I bet none of these moronic daredevils would tackle: trying to say something intelligent about Jackass: The Movie."

Deseret Morning News's Jeff Vice gave the film 1½ stars and said the 80-minute run time was too much. Vice described the film as "possibly the most irresponsible picture ever released by a major film studio." Writing for Entertainment Weekly, Owen Gleiberman gave the film a "B" and said the film "provokes a suspense halfway between comedy and horror. I'm not sure if I enjoyed myself, exactly, but I could hardly wait to see what I'd be appalled by next." Gleiberman also said "In the movie version of the show that might just as well have been called America's Funniest Frat-House Hazing Rituals, the boys engage in infantile Candid Camera grossouts..." Film Journal International's Ethan Alter, who admitted to having never seen an episode of the TV show, said "it would be easy for me to hold Jackass: The Movie up as a leading example of the decline of Western civilization." Alter said he was disturbed by "the film's, and by extension the audience's, cavalier attitude towards pain."

LA Weekly critic Paul Malcolm listed Jackass: The Movie as one of the 10 best films of 2002 and also called it the most underrated film of the year. Film Threat's Pete Vonder Haar said the results of "essentially transplanting the show to the big screen" are "incredibly funny and often too disgusting for words."

The Miami Herald's Rene Rodriguez gave the film 2½ stars out of 4 and said "Johnny Knoxville and his merry band of anarchists ran around performing the sort of suicidal stunts parental warnings were invented for" and "the gang also likes to train their sights on the unsuspecting public, Candid Camera style." Reviewing the film for The New York Times, A.O. Scott said it "is essentially an extended episode of the popular Jackass MTV series" and that "some of the undertakings, amateurishly recorded on video, are like demented science experiments." Scott said "Jackass the Movie is like a documentary version of Fight Club, shorn of social insight, intellectual pretension and cinematic interest".

The Village Voice's Ed Halter said "their feature debut plays like a longer episode of the show" and said "it's funny, as the old saying goes, because it's true." Halter wrote "the structure is ruthlessly efficient: no plot, no characters, no sets, and no downtime—just one sight-gag right after another." Scott Foundas of Variety referred to Jackass: The Movie as the first reality film when reviewing The Real Cancun in April 2003.

In a film critic roundup of 2002 films in The Village Voice, film critic Armond White said "Best Documentary: Jackass, far and away." Ed Halter of The Village Voice wrote, "MTV would surely love to claim Jackass as a mutant by-product of its Real World franchise, but its roots lie elsewhere", saying "their self-destructive brand of docu-comedy emerged as a bizarrely elaborate version of a skateboard-video mainstay: slam sections..." Jennie Punter of The Globe and Mail said the film "belongs in the too-hot-for-TV direct-to-video/DVD category".

=== Accolades ===
Award / Film Festival	Date of ceremony	Category	Recipient(s)	Result	Ref.
Golden Raspberry Awards	March 22, 2003	Most Flatulent Teen-Targeted Movie	Jackass: The Movie	Won	

== Soundtrack ==
The soundtrack was released on October 25, 2002, by American Recordings. The soundtrack features songs that were featured in the movie, and various audio clips from the movie.

== Sequels ==
Jackass: The Movie was filmed with a modest budget of approximately $5 million, but earned more than $22 million during its opening weekend, effectively managing to secure the top spot at the box office for its debut and immediately making back its budget at least 4 times over. It eventually grossed more than $64 million in North America alone.

Initially meant as the "grand finale" for the series as several cast members, most notably Bam Margera and Steve-O, focused on new shows outside the Jackass brand, the crew ultimately decided to reunite for another film as Steve-O in particular realized part of the reason he did Jackass-style stunts on his programs was because of how much he enjoyed working with the crew.

On September 22, 2006, Paramount Pictures released Jackass Number Two. A feature titled Jackass 2.5 was compiled of interviews with the cast and crew members, and outtakes shot during the making of the second film, and released direct-to-DVD on December 26, 2007.

In December 2009, Paramount Pictures and MTV Films issued a press release that a second sequel titled Jackass 3D would be made. It was released on October 15, 2010. The movie was filmed in 3D starting in January 2010. Jackass 3.5 was compiled of interviews with the cast and crew members, and outtakes shot during the making of the third film. The film was released in weekly installments on Joost from April 1 through June 13, 2011. The entire film was then released direct-to-DVD on June 14, 2011.

In July 2013, a spin-off movie titled Jackass Presents: Bad Grandpa was announced. It was released on October 25, 2013, exactly 11 years after Jackass: The Movie came out. Unlike the other Jackass movies, this one has a story and features just Johnny Knoxville dressed as his grandpa character, Irving Zisman. A separate movie titled Jackass Presents: Bad Grandpa.5 was made out of unused footage, outtakes, and interviews with the cast and crew members during the making of Bad Grandpa. This film premiered on MTV on June 15, 2014.

In December 2019, a third sequel, Jackass Forever, was announced and scheduled to be released on March 5, 2021, but was eventually delayed for July 2, 2021, and again to September 3, 2021. In April 2021 the movie was delayed again to October 22, 2021. In September 2021, the movie was delayed once more to February 4, 2022. Jackass 4.5 is compiled of interviews with the cast and crew members, and outtakes shot during the filming of the fourth movie and was released on Netflix on May 20, 2022.

In January 2026, Knoxville announced that Jackass: Best and Last would be released in theaters on June 26 of that year. Like the title says, it is the last Jackass movie. It will also not have a .5 sequel.
