= Big Brother (magazine) =

American skateboarding magazine

- Editor: Dave Carnie; Chris Nieratko
- Staff writers: Sean Cliver; Earl Parker; Jeff Tremaine; Chris Pontius; Marc McKee
- Photographer: Rick Kosick
- Categories: Skateboarding magazine
- Publisher: Larry Flynt
- Founder: Steve Rocco
- Founded: 1992
- Final issue: 2004
- Country: United States
- Language: English

Big Brother was a skateboarding magazine founded by Steve Rocco in 1992, which was notable for ushering in street skating and the sub-culture of skateboarding. Big Brother ceased publication in 2004.

The magazine often covered various taboo topics in addition to skateboarding. Early articles featured step by step suicide methods and rip-off schemes such as how to make a fake ID. It would also regularly employ odd gimmicks such as printing the magazine in different sizes, packaging it in a cereal box and including seemingly incongruous items such as trading cards and a cassette tape in the packaging. Early writers included Sean Cliver, Earl Parker (Thomas Schmidt), Jeff Tremaine, Marc McKee, Mike Ballard and Pat Canale.

They also released a few videos, including "Shit", then "Number Two", with a few stunts and pranks, but the videos were mostly skateboarding-oriented.

A documentary on the magazine's history, Dumb: The Story of Big Brother Magazine premiered on Hulu on June 3, 2017. The documentary featured interviews with Johnny Knoxville, Spike Jonze, Jeff Tremaine, Chris Pontius, Wee Man, Steve-O, Bam Margera, and others who were involved in the magazine's creation.

== History ==
The magazine contained mostly articles about skateboarding, as well as some nudity, stunts, pranks, and random ramblings from its staff. Its later days were characterized by the clever wordplay of editors Dave Carnie and Chris Nieratko. The magazine was purchased by Larry Flynt in 1997. After Flynt began publishing the magazine, the nudity was toned down or scrapped altogether, though the vulgarity remained.

In 1998, Laura Schlessinger was in Beach Access, a Costa Mesa surf shop, with her son when she began perusing Big Brother. Schlessinger deemed the magazine to be "stealth pornography" and said so on her radio show. When Tom Moore, the owner of Beach Access, publicly denied that she found pornography in his store, Schlessinger sued Moore for lying and claimed that his denial had hurt her reputation. When Schlessinger's case went to court, the judge said it was a frivolous lawsuit and dismissed it. Moore's $4M countersuit against Schlessinger, lodged for hurting the reputation of his store (defamation), was allowed to stand. The suit has since been settled, but terms of the settlement have not been revealed. Behind the scenes and off the record, Moore's lawyers and friends claimed victory, indicating the settlement was "about the amount of a moderately priced Orange County home" (at the time, $650,000 to $2 million).

In one of the more bizarre episodes of the magazine's history, the subscriber list for Big Brother was accidentally swapped with Taboo, one of Larry Flynt's hardcore pornography magazines: Big Brother subscribers were sent issues of Taboo, and vice versa. This incident was parodied on The Tonight Show with Jay Leno in which one of the band members was delivered an issue of Big Brother live on stage, suggesting that he subscribed to Taboo and received it in error.

The magazine was unexpectedly dropped by Larry Flynt publications in February 2004. In early 2008, it was announced on Jackassworld.com that Big Brother would be returning in a digital format.

A similar magazine, KingShit, released its first issue in May 2009. Based in Toronto, Ontario, Dave Carnie is the editor-at-large, and Chris Nieratko is a contributing editor.

Big Brother was also credited for the development of the television series Jackass, as Jeff Tremaine recalled in the Jackass episode "Where Are They Now?".

== Big Brother videos ==
=== Shit ===
Year released: 1996

- Cover: Showed Jason "Wee-Man" Acuña in blue body paint.
- Dave Carnie attends Wigstock and calls cross dressers fruitcakes.

=== Number Two ===
Year released: 1998

- Cover: Johnny Lee Countee in a Devo suit.
- Showed an obscure old school skateboarder (Johnny Lee Countee) skating in front of his house, the only area he ever skated at.
- Showed Johnny Knoxville testing out self-defense equipment, including pepper spray, two types of stun guns and a small caliber pistol. This footage was the basis for the MTV reality series Jackass, though MTV omitted the last part of the segment that showed Knoxville shooting himself in the chest with a small handgun while wearing a kevlar vest.

=== boob ===
Year released: 1999

- Cover: Editor Dave Carnie in a gold spandex suit and rollerblades; ("boob", when looked at in a mirror upside down, reads "poop").
- Contained several skateboarding tours and also featured a Steve-O stunt section and editor Dave Carnie skateboarding in a gold spandex suit.

=== Crap ===
Year released: 2001

- Cover: photographer Rick Kosick in an adult diaper while tied to a cross.
- Showed the "Depends Olympics" and/or "Jesus Games," which involved the Big Brother staff getting drunk, wearing adult diapers, and participating in games. One of the games was the Jesus Race, where people race while heaving a large wooden cross on their backs.
