= Jackass Presents: Mat Hoffman's Tribute to Evel Knievel =

- DVD cover
- Directed by: Elia Lyssy
- Produced by: Greg Iguchi; Kevin Harrison; Kemp Curley; Bruno Musso
- Starring: Johnny Knoxville; Mat Hoffman; Travis Pastrana; Allan Cooke; Jeff "Harley" Schneider; Davin "Psycho" Halford; Scott Plamer; Trigger Gumm; Midget Mike
- Cinematography: Matt Goodman
- Edited by: James Ronckovitz; Chad Freeman; Jeff Monty; David Stein; Kemp Curley
- Production companies: Dickhouse Productions; MTV Films
- Distributed by: Paramount Home Entertainment
- Release date: May 27, 2008
- Running time: 47 minutes
- Country: United States
- Language: English

Jackass Presents: Mat Hoffman's Tribute to Evel Knievel is a 2008 direct-to-DVD comedy film and the first Jackass Presents film in the Jackass franchise. It was released on May 27, 2008. The film is a tribute to the stuntman Evel Knievel, who died on November 30, 2007, one year before the film's release. Jackass Presents: Mat Hoffman's Tribute to Evel Knievel was succeeded by Jackass Presents: Bad Grandpa.

== Reception ==
A review stated that: "Along with a showing of sheer stupidity involving an airplane, a skydiver, and the significant lack of a parachute, the rest of this outing brings new meaning to the words 'daring', 'determination' and just plain 'dumb'." Another review was more negative about the general production: "Unfortunately for the latest "Jackass" DVD release, Mat Hoffman's Tribute to Evel Knievel, that formula has been abandoned for a tedious, interview-heavy production that is more of a testament to the stunt performers' egos than a tribute to godfather Knievel."

The Oklahoma Gazette noted that "The show culminates in Knoxville's accident in which a motorcycle lands on his crotch and tears his urethra.", a scene that also caught the attention of a review on Bmxultra.com while a review on the website GameVortex states: 'While this DVD doesn't feel like your typical Jackass production (mainly the inclusion of actual professionals), it is full of stunts to pique any Jackass fan's interest and as a tribute to Knievel, it definitely follows in his footsteps, because as they say several times in this video, "You're never a failure at life as long as you try and get back up."'
