= Chris Pontius =

American stunt performer and television personality (born 1974)

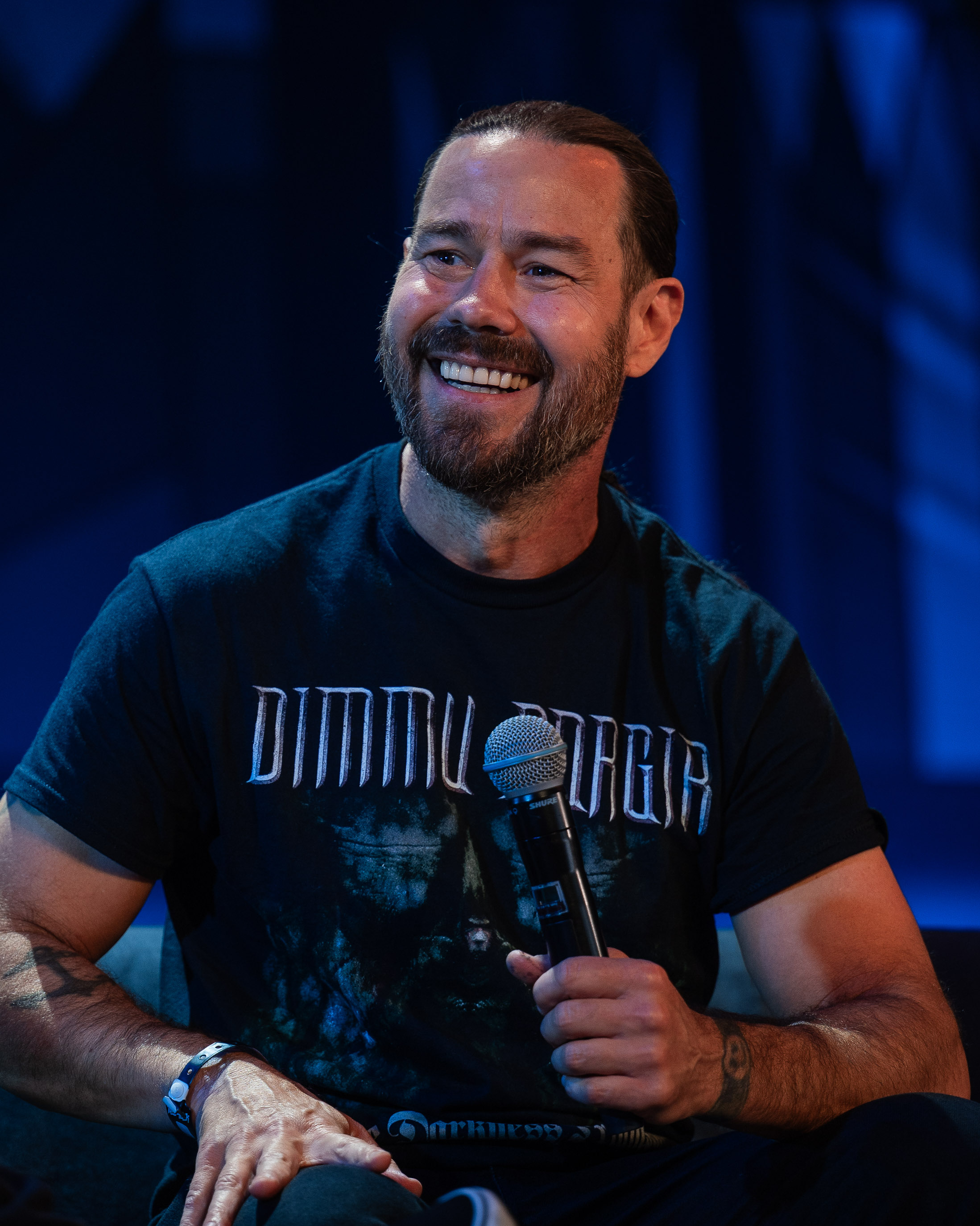
- Pontius in 2025
- Born: July 16, 1974 (age 52); Pasadena, California, U.S.
- Occupations: Stunt performer; television personality
- Years active: 1996–present
- Known for: Jackass
- Spouse: Claire Nolan (m. 2004; div. 2013)
- Children: 1
- Website: chrispontius.com

Chris Pontius (born July 16, 1974) is an American stunt performer and television personality. He is best known as one of the main cast members of the MTV reality series Jackass (2000–2001), and its subsequent films across its 24-year-long run. Pontius is a former co-star of the Jackass spin-off Wildboyz alongside fellow cast member Steve-O.

== Early life ==
Chris Pontius was born on July 16, 1974, in Pasadena, California, and grew up in San Luis Obispo. As a teenager, he appeared in the skateboarding magazine Big Brother, where he was later hired as a writer.

== Career ==
Pontius's work at Big Brother led to his inclusion in Jackass, which premiered on MTV in 2000. He became known for his comic and daring stunts, including the recurring "Party Boy" sketch in which he performs spontaneous public dances while wearing only a thong. His stunts often emphasized physical comedy, embarrassment humor, and absurdity, making him one of the more recognizable characters in the Jackass ensemble.

Pontius returned to the film franchise with Jackass Forever (2022), appearing alongside the original cast. It is the first Jackass movie in which Pontius got a producer credit, as he served as a co-producer. Critics praised the film's blend of reckless humor with a more reflective tone about aging and camaraderie among the performers. The movie grossed more than US$80 million worldwide. Jackass 4.5, was released three months after Jackass Forever, with Pontius once again serving as co-producer. He also appeared in Jackass: Best and Last, alongside the entire main cast of Jackass Forever. It was theatrically released on June 26, 2026.

In 2025, Pontius began filming a Norwegian television series about the country's rock and heavy metal history, alongside musician Tarjei Strøm for the Tons of Rock festival.

== Personal life ==
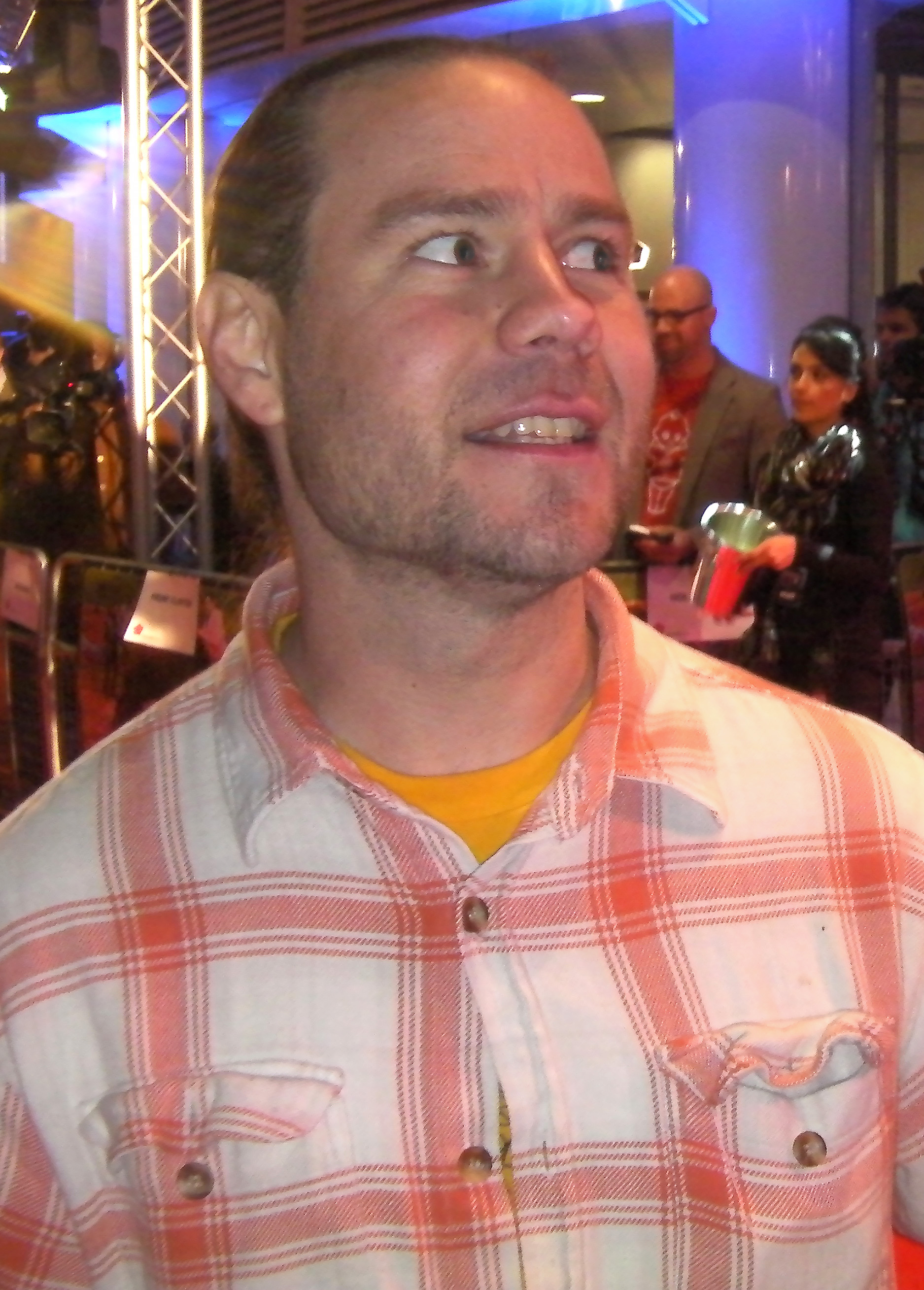
Pontius in 2010

Pontius was married to Claire Nolan from 2004 until their divorce in 2013. He has one son, born in 2019. As of 2025, he was in a relationship with Mae Quijada.

Pontius is a long-time collector of knives and axes. He is a fan of black metal and has collaborated with Vreid and Djerv's Agnete Kjølsrud for the music video of the song "Loving The Dead", and has joined the bands at Wacken Open Air on guitar for a performance of the song.

== Filmography ==
=== Movies ===
Year	Film	Role	Notes
2002	Jackass: The Movie	Himself	Writer
2003	Charlie's Angels: Full Throttle	Irish Dock Worker	Cameo
2006	National Lampoon's TV: The Movie	Jesus Christ	
2006	Jackass Number Two	Himself	Writer; Soundtrack
2007	Jackass 2.5	Himself	Writer; Soundtrack
2008	What We Do Is Secret	Black Randy	
2010	Somewhere	Sammy	
2010	Jackass 3D	Himself	Writer
2011	Jackass 3.5	Himself	Writer
2017	Dumb: The Story of Big Brother Magazine	Himself	Documentary
2018	Action Point	Benny	
2018	Game Over, Man!	Himself	Cameo
2022	Jackass Forever	Himself	Writer; Co-producer
2022	Jackass 4.5	Himself	Writer; Co-producer
2026	Jackass: Best and Last	Himself	Writer; Co-producer

=== Television ===
Year	Title	Role	Notes
2000–2001	Jackass	Himself	21 episodes
2002	Jackass Backyard BBQ	Himself	TV special
2002	MTV Cribs	Himself	1 episode
2003	Jackass Winterjam	Himself	TV special
2003	2003 MTV Movie Awards	Himself	Guest appearance
2003	2003 MTV Europe Music Awards	Himself	Presenter
2003	MTV Video Music Awards Latinoamérica 2003	Himself	Presenter
2003–2006	Wildboyz	Himself	Host; Co-creator; 32 episodes
2004–2006	Totally Busted	Himself	
2004-2010	The Tonight Show with Jay Leno	Himself	5 episodes
2005	Jackass: Gumball 3000 Rally Special	Himself	TV special
2005	America's Next Top Model	Himself	Episode 5.8
2006	2006 MTV Video Music Awards	Himself	Presenter
2006	Los Premios MTV Latinoamérica 2006	Himself	Presenter
2006	WWE Monday Night RAW	Himself	Episode 14.42
2007	The Podge and Rodge Show	Himself	Episode 3.7
2008	Jackassworld.com: 24 Hour Takeover	Himself	TV special
2009	Nitro Circus	Himself	1 episode
2009	Steve-O: Demise and Rise	Himself	TV movie documentary
2010	2010 MTV Video Music Awards	Himself	Presenter
2010	2010 MTV Europe Music Awards	Himself	Presenter
2010	Up Close with Carrie Keagan	Himself	1 episode
2010–2018	Made in Hollywood	Himself	Episode 6.4 and episode 13.36
2011	Good News Week	Himself	Episode 10.7
2011	A Tribute to Ryan Dunn	Himself	TV documentary
2012	Raising Hope	Albert	Episode 2.15: "Sheer Madness"
2012	Rally On	Himself	Episode 1.6: "NOLA Blues: New Orleans to Orlando"
2013	MTV Cribs	Himself	Episode 12.1
2013–2014	Tanked	Himself	2 episodes
2014	Loiter Squad	Himself	Episode 3.3: "Sharpshooter"
2016	Ridiculousness	Himself	Episode 7.20
2016	Party Legends	Himself	Episode 1.1
2017	Epicly Later'd: Bam Margera	Himself	TV documentary
2018	Celebrity Page	Himself	Episode 3.195
2021	Jackass Shark Week	Himself	TV special
2021	WWE SmackDown	Himself	Episode 24.10; Guest appearance
2022	UFC 270	Himself	Audience member
2022	WrestleMania 38	Himself	Johnny Knoxville's accomplice
2022	Jackass Shark Week 2.0	Himself	TV special Producer
2022	Celebrity Family Feud	Himself	Participant; Episode 9.11
2023	History of the World, Part II	Russian Assassin	3 episodes

=== DVDs ===
Year	Title	Role	Notes
1996	Big Brother	Himself	
1998	Number Two: Big Brother	Himself	
2001	Don't Try This at Home: The Steve-O Video	Himself	Guest appearances
2001	CKY3	Himself	Cameo as Party Boy
2002	Don't Try This at Home – The Steve-O Video Vol. 2: The Tour	Himself	Guest appearances
2003	Steve-O: Out on Bail	Himself	Cameo
2004	Steve-O: The Early Years	Himself	Documentary
2006	Ultimate Predator	Himself	Guest appearances
2009	Jackass: The Lost Tapes	Himself	Archive footage Writer; Soundtrack
2020	Steve-O: Gnarly	Himself	Guest appearances
2023	Steve-O's Bucket List	Himself	Guest appearances

=== Web series ===
Year	Title	Role	Notes
2008	Hardly Working	Himself	1 episode: "Jackass"
2015	Jackass Reunion: 15 Years Later	Himself	Rolling Stone special
2019	Bathroom Break Podcast	Himself	Guest; 1 episode
2020–2024	Steve-O's Wild Ride!	Himself	Guest; 3 episodes Podcast
2023–	The Pontius Show	Himself	Host; Co-creator; Podcast
2026	Hot Ones: Wing Pong	Himself	1 episode
2026	Jackass: The Podcast	Himself	Guest; 2 episodes
2026	Let It Kill You: Jeff Tremaine	Himself	Documentary

=== Video games ===
Year	Title	Role	Notes
2007	Jackass: The Game	Himself	Voice and motion capture

=== Music videos ===
Year	Artist	Track	Role	Notes
2001	Shaquille O'Neal	"Psycho"	Himself	Unreleased
2002	CKY	"Flesh into Gear"	Himself	Archived footage
2002	Andrew W.K.	"We Want Fun"	Himself	
2003	Roger Alan Wade	"If You're Gonna Be Dumb, You Gotta Be Tough"	Himself	
2006	Chris Pontius	"Karazy"	Himself	Writer and performer
2010	Weezer	"Memories"	Himself	
2019	Derek Milton	"Gentle Chameleon"	Himself	
2026	Vreid	”Loving the Dead”	Himself	
