= Steve Rocco =

American skateboarder and businessman (born 1960)

Stephen Salvadore Rocco (born January 16, 1960) is an American businessman and skateboarder. He founded the skateboarding company World Industries with Rodney Mullen in 1987. He sold the company in 2002 and is currently retired.

== Career ==
Rocco is an important figure in the early popularity of street skateboarding in the 1990s. His ads were direct messages to the consumer in words that resonated with the skateboarders of the time. He is the cofounder of Blind, 101, Plan B, and Duffs. In 1992, he founded the skateboarding magazine Big Brother.

Rocco is the subject of the theatrically released 2007 documentary The Man Who Souled the World.
