= Johnny Knoxville =

American stunt performer and actor (born 1971)

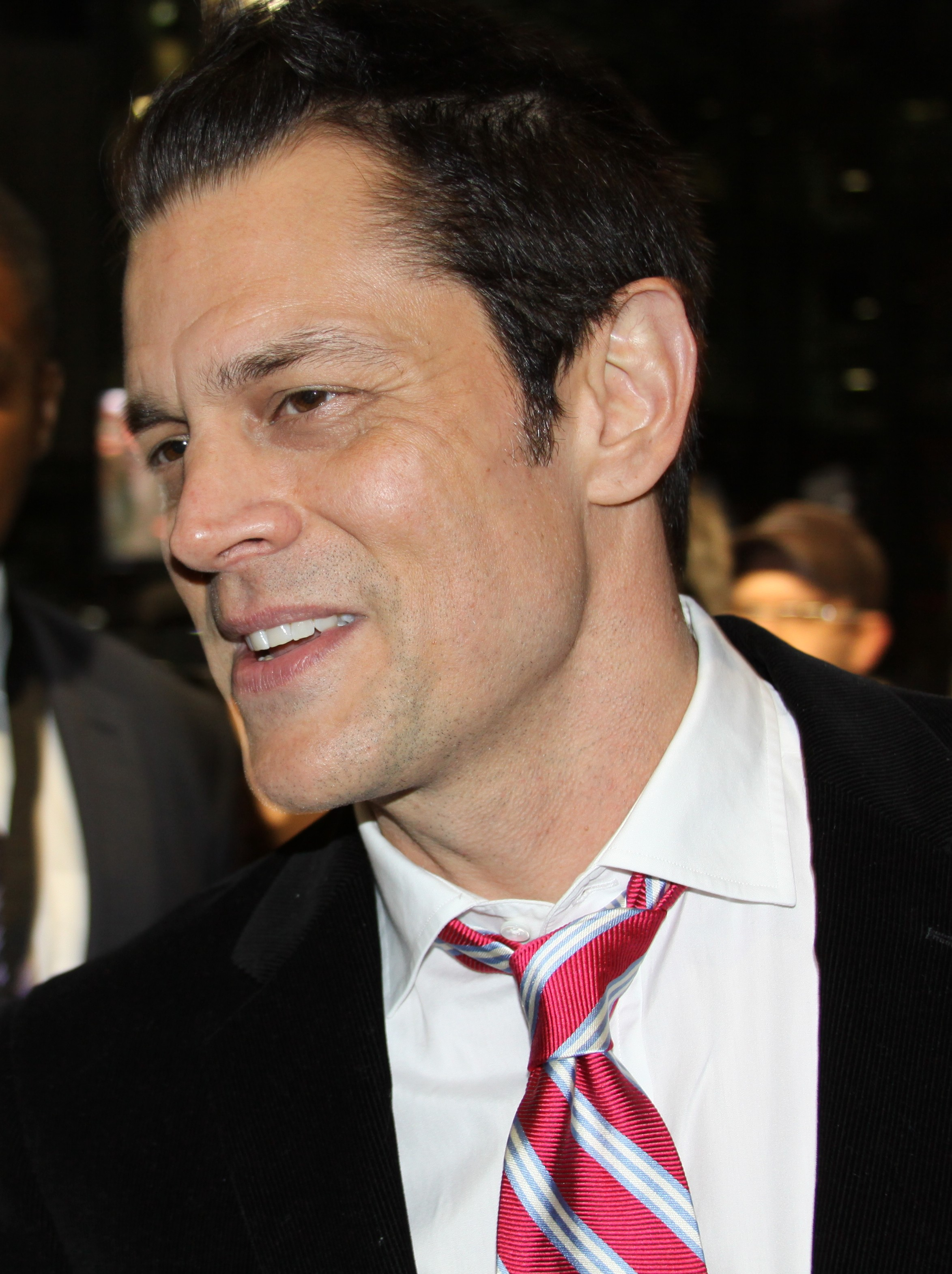
- Knoxville in 2010
- Born: Philip John Clapp; March 11, 1971 (age 55); Knoxville, Tennessee, U.S.
- Occupations: Stunt performer; actor; producer; writer
- Years active: 1992–present
- Spouses: Melanie Cates (m. 1995; div. 2008) Naomi Nelson (m. 2010; div. 2024) Emily Ting (m. 2025)
- Children: 3
- Relatives: Roger Alan Wade (cousin)

Philip John Clapp (born March 11, 1971), known professionally as Johnny Knoxville, is an American stunt performer, actor, producer, and screenwriter. He is best known as a co-creator and star of the MTV reality slapstick comedy stunt show Jackass (2000–2001) and its subsequent movie franchise (2002–2026).

Following the conclusion of Jackass, Knoxville and his co-stars returned for the first installment in the Jackass film series, with a second and third installment released in 2006, and 2010, respectively. Jackass Presents: Bad Grandpa (2013), the first film in the series to feature a storyline, saw him star as his Jackass character Irving Zisman. The fourth main installment, Jackass Forever, was released in 2022. Jackass: Best and Last was released in 2026. It is the final Jackass movie.

Knoxville has had acting roles in films Men in Black II (2002), Grand Theft Parsons (2003), A Dirty Shame and Walking Tall (both 2004), The Dukes of Hazzard, The Ringer, and a cameo role as a sleazy corporate president of a skateboard company in Lords of Dogtown (all 2005), The Last Stand (2013), Skiptrace (2016), and the television series Reboot (2022). He also voiced Leonardo in Teenage Mutant Ninja Turtles (2014).

== Early life ==
Knoxville was born Philip John Clapp in Knoxville, Tennessee, on March 11, 1971, the son of Sunday school teacher Lemoyne (née Houck) and car and tire salesman Philip Clapp. He has two older sisters. Knoxville has compared his father to Dr Jekyll and Mr Hyde: "when he's not drunk, he was amazing, super funny. But when he was drinking it was total hell." Hanging out in his father's tire store, Knoxville would watch his dad play pranks on the "crazy characters" who worked for him. When he was fourteen, his cousin, singer-songwriter Roger Alan Wade, gave him a copy of Jack Kerouac's book On the Road. He credits this with sparking his interest in acting.

After reading about Air Force researcher John Stapp, who conducted an experiment on himself to determine how much force a human body could withstand, Knoxville sympathized with the feeling Stapp termed "survival euphoria". Knoxville described it as a feeling after adrenaline that makes him desire even greater risk.

Knoxville attended South-Young High School (now South-Doyle High School) in Knoxville, where he played on the baseball team and was named All-Knoxville Interscholastic League Honorable Mention. He also played in the Knoxville Area All Star game as a pitcher. After graduating in 1989, he moved to California to become an actor. He began appearing in commercials and as an extra, including a job as Keanu Reeves's stand-in on the 1992 Francis Ford Coppola film Bram Stoker's Dracula. When the breakthrough role he sought eluded him, he decided to create his own opportunities by writing and pitching article ideas to various magazines. An idea to test self-defense equipment on himself captured the interest of Jeff Tremaine's skateboarding magazine Big Brother, and the stunts were filmed and included in Big Brother's "Number Two" video.

== Career ==
=== Jackass ===
Knoxville at the 2011 San Diego Comic-Con

Knoxville is responsible for many of the ideas in Jackass, and is often seen as the de facto leader of the crew. The show is directed by Jeff Tremaine, who produced a pilot that used footage from Big Brother and Bam Margera's CKY videos.

With help from Tremaine's friend, film director Spike Jonze, they pitched a series to various networks. A deal was made with MTV and Jackass was born. He starred in Jackass: The Movie (2002), Jackass Number Two (2006), Jackass 2.5 (2007), Jackass 3D (2010), Jackass 3.5 (2011), Jackass Forever (2022), Jackass 4.5 (2022), and Jackass: Best and Last (2026) It will also be the last Jackass film.

Knoxville also participated in the Gumball 3000 for Jackass along with co-stars Steve-O, Chris Pontius, Jackass director Jeff Tremaine, producer Trip Taylor, cinematographer Dimitry Elyashkevich, and cameraman Greg "Guch" Iguchi. Prior to Jackass premiering on MTV, Knoxville and company turned down an offer to perform their stunts for Saturday Night Live on a weekly basis, though Knoxville later hosted a 2005 episode of the show.

=== Acting ===
Knoxville's original leading role debut was set to be a holiday comedy released in late 2001 named The Tree but the project never came to fruition. Knoxville has been in several feature films, such as The Dukes of Hazzard (2005) and playing a two-headed alien in Men in Black II (2002). Knoxville also worked with John Waters in A Dirty Shame (2004), and appeared as a supporting character to The Rock in Walking Tall that same year.

He starred in Katrina Holden Bronson's Daltry Calhoun in 2005, and in The Ringer as an office worker who pretends to be disabled and joins the Special Olympics to pay for surgery for his office's janitor. He starred in the movie Lords of Dogtown as Topper Burks, made a minor appearance in the 2000 movie Coyote Ugly, and was featured as a guest voice on two episodes of King of the Hill.

Knoxville appeared in the John Madden-directed adaptation of Elmore Leonard's novel, Killshot, however, his character was subsequently removed from the final cut of the film. He guest-starred in a season 3 episode "Prank Wars" on Viva La Bam, in which he and Ryan Dunn trashed Bam Margera's Hummer and performed other pranks. He voiced himself in an episode of Family Guy. He co-produced The Dudesons in America and the now-canceled Nitro Circus on MTV.

In 2010, Knoxville hosted a three-part online video for Palladium Boots titled Detroit Lives. The videos focus on the resurgence of creativity in Detroit. Knoxville guest-starred as the voice of Johnny Krill, an extreme sports enthusiast, in "Extreme Spots", a 2012 episode of SpongeBob SquarePants. Knoxville voiced Leonardo in the 2014 film, Teenage Mutant Ninja Turtles but did not appear in the sequel, Teenage Mutant Ninja Turtles: Out of the Shadows.

=== Production credits ===
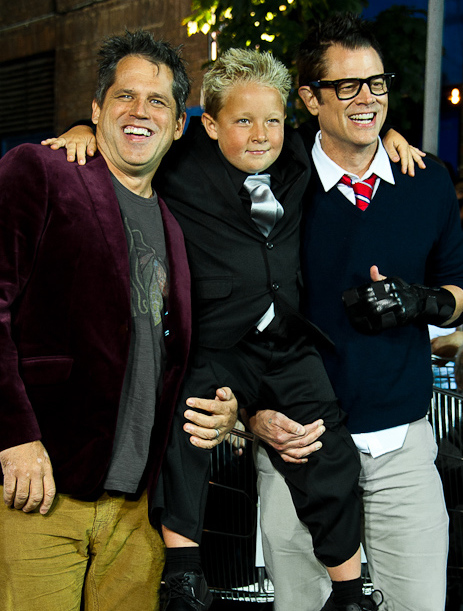
Knoxville (right) with Jeff Tremaine (left) and Bad Grandpa co-star Jackson Nicoll

Knoxville has a production company called Dickhouse Productions, which he owns and operates with Jeff Tremaine and Spike Jonze of the Jackass franchise. Dickhouse's projects include The Birth of Big Air (2010), a documentary about Mat Hoffman that was part of ESPN's 30 for 30 series, and The Wild and Wonderful Whites of West Virginia (2010), both of which have been picked up by Tribeca Films.

In May 2014, Knoxville (along with Jackass Executive Producer/H.M.F.I.C. Derek Freda) formally announced the formation of a new production company called 'Hello Junior', which will continue Knoxville's now-longstanding relationship with Paramount Pictures, who have signed an exclusive two-year first-look deal with Knoxville and 'Hello Junior' in the wake of the massive success of Bad Grandpa in late 2013. Knoxville was quoted as saying, "I am over the damn moon about continuing an amazing partnership with Paramount Pictures. I have many more films to make and bones to break. I am glad I will be doing it for Paramount."

=== Professional wrestling ===
Knoxville first appeared on WWE television on the October 13, 2008, episode of Raw, where he was involved in a feud with The Great Khali. He was featured as a Raw guest host on October 4, 2010.

In 2022, Knoxville was involved in a feud with Sami Zayn. He participated in the annual Royal Rumble match in January, where he was quickly eliminated by Zayn. This led to an "Anything Goes" match at WrestleMania 38 in April, where Knoxville defeated Zayn with the help of several Jackass crew members.

=== Podcast ===
Knoxville stepped into the world of podcasting in April 2024 with his show "Pretty Sure I Can Fly with Johnny Knoxville & Elna Baker".

He also hosts an official Jackass podcast titled Jackass: The Podcast, along with Jackass director and producer Jeff Tremaine. The first episode aired on June 18, 2026.

== Personal life ==
On February 4, 2009, Knoxville explained on The Howard Stern Show that he tore his urethra during a stunt for Jackass Presents: Mat Hoffman's Tribute to Evel Knievel (2008), describing how he had to flush it twice daily. He said this was done by "sticking a tube into [his] penis all the way up to [his] bladder", a practice known as urinary catheterization. He said the process prevented scar tissue from forming and that he performed the procedure "twice a day for three and a half years" after the injury.

While filming the prank show The Prank Panel in December 2022, Knoxville was sued by handyman Khalil Khan, who alleged that he was subjected to a "terrifying ordeal" after signing up for a job on TaskRabbit. He was sued again in May 2024 for allegedly tazing a segment producer during the filming of The Prank Panel.

=== Marriages and children ===
Knoxville married Melanie Lynn Cates on May 15, 1995. Their daughter was born on January 4, 1996. She can be heard in the credits for Jackass Number Two (2006), is seen in "The Making of Jackass Two" on the special features on the DVD, and was seen punching Tremaine with a boxing glove in the credits of Jackass 3D (2010). After 11 years of marriage, Knoxville and Cates separated in July 2006. Knoxville filed for divorce on July 3, 2007. The marriage legally ended in March 2008, with final divorce arrangements settled in July 2009.

In December 2009, Knoxville's girlfriend Naomi Nelson gave birth to their son. Knoxville and Nelson married on September 24, 2010. Nelson gave birth to their second child together, a daughter, in October 2011. On June 17, 2022, it was reported that Knoxville had filed for divorce.

In November 2025, Johnny Knoxville married costume designer Emily Ting. The wedding was officiated by John Waters.

== Filmography ==
=== Film ===
Year	Title	Role	Notes
1995	Desert Blues	Bob	
1998	Number Two: Big Brother	Himself (uncredited)	Direct-to-video
1999	boob	Himself	Direct-to-video
2000	Coyote Ugly	College Guy	
2001	Crap: Big Brother	Himself (uncredited)	Direct-to-video
2001	Don't Try This at Home: The Steve-O Video	Himself	Direct-to-video; Guest appearances
2001	CKY3	Himself	Direct-to-video; Guest appearances
2002	Life Without Dick	Dick Rasmusson	
2002	Big Trouble	Eddie Leadbetter	
2002	Deuces Wild	Vinnie 'Fish'	
2002	Men in Black II	Scrad / Charlie	
2002	Jackass: The Movie	Himself / Irving Zisman	Writer and producer
2002	CKY4: The Latest & Greatest	Himself	Direct-to-video; Guest appearances
2002	Don't Try This at Home: The Steve-O Video Vol. 2: The Tour	Himself	Cameo; Direct-to-video
2003	Grand Theft Parsons	Phil Kaufman	
2004	Walking Tall	Deputy Ray Templeton	
2004	A Dirty Shame	Ray 'Ray-Ray' Perkins	
2004	Steve-O: The Early Years	Himself	Direct-to-video documentary
2005	Lords of Dogtown	Topper Burks	
2005	The Dukes of Hazzard	Luke Duke	
2005	Daltry Calhoun	Daltry Calhoun	
2005	The Ringer	Steve Barker / Jeffie	
2006	Ultimate Predator	Himself	Direct-to-video; Guest appearances
2006	Jackass Number Two	Himself / Irving Zisman	Writer and producer
2007	Jackass 2.5	Himself / Irving Zisman	Writer and producer
2007	The Man Who Souled the World	Himself	Documentary
2008	Killshot	Ferris Britton	Scenes deleted
2008	Jackass Presents: Mat Hoffman's Tribute to Evel Knievel	Himself	Direct-to-video; Executive producer
2009	Jackass: The Lost Tapes	Himself	Direct-to-video
2010	Father of Invention	Troy Coangelo	
2010	Jackass 3D	Himself / Irving Zisman	Writer and producer
2011	Jackass 3.5	Himself / Irving Zisman	Writer and producer
2012	Nitro Circus: The Movie	Himself	Guest appearances
2012	Nature Calls	Kirk	
2012	Fun Size	Jörgen	Uncredited
2013	The Last Stand	Lewis Dinkum	
2013	Movie 43	Pete	
2013	Small Apartments	Tommy Balls	
2013	Jackass Presents: Bad Grandpa	Irving Zisman	Writer and producer
2014	Jackass Presents: Bad Grandpa .5	Himself / Irving Zisman	Writer and producer
2014	Teenage Mutant Ninja Turtles	Leonardo	Voice
2015	Being Evel	Himself	Producer; Documentary
2016	Elvis & Nixon	Sonny West	
2016	Skiptrace	Connor Watts	
2017	Dumb: The Story of Big Brother Magazine	Himself	Documentary
2018	Half Magic	Father Gary	
2018	Weightless	Ed	
2018	Action Point	Deshawn Crious 'D.C.' Carver	Writer and producer
2018	Rosy	James	
2018	The Great Buster: A Celebration	Himself	Documentary
2019	Polar	Michael Green	
2019	Above Suspicion	Cash	
2019	We Summon the Darkness	Pastor John Henry Butler	
2020	Steve-O: Gnarly	Himself	Direct-to-video; Guest appearance
2020	Mainstream	Ted Wick	
2022	Jackass Forever	Himself / Irving Zisman	Writer and producer
2022	Jackass 4.5	Himself / Irving Zisman	Writer and producer
2024	Sweet Dreams	Morris	Executive producer
2024	Saving Bikini Bottom: The Sandy Cheeks Movie	Randy Cheeks	Voice
2024	The Luckiest Man in America	Leon Hart	
2026	I Want Your Sex	Detective Zem	
2026	Jackass: Best and Last	Himself	Writer and producer
2026	Tiny Fugitives	Bob	
TBA	The Marshmallow Experiment	Will	Post-production
TBA	The Brandon Novak Story	Himself	Documentary
TBA	The Young People	TBA	Post-production

=== Television ===
Year	Title	Role	Notes
1992	The Ben Stiller Show	Cure Fan	1 episode
1999	Big Brother	Himself	
2000–2001	Jackass	Himself	Co-creator; Executive producer
2001	The Andy Dick Show	Wannabe Andy Dick	2 episodes
2001	2001 MTV Video Music Awards	Himself	Presenter
2001	2001 MTV Movie Awards	Himself	Presenter
2002	Jackass Backyard BBQ	Himself	TV special Executive producer
2002	MTV Cribs	Himself	1 episode
2002	2002 MTV Video Music Awards	Himself	Presenter
2002	2002 MTV Movie Awards	Himself	Presenter
2002	MTV Video Music Awards Latinoamérica 2002	Himself	Presenter
2003	Player$	Himself	1 episode
2003	Australian Idol	Himself	Special guest appearance
2003–2006	Wildboyz	Himself	10 episodes
2004	Cooking Channel	Himself	
2004	Viva La Bam	Himself	1 episode
2005	Saturday Night Live	Himself	1 episode
2005	Jackass: Gumball 3000 Rally Special	Himself	TV special Executive producer
2005	2005 MTV Movie Awards	Himself	Presenter
2006	King of the Hill	Peter Sterling	Voice; 1 episode
2006	2006 MTV Video Music Awards	Himself	Presenter
2006	Los Premios MTV Latinoamérica 2006	Himself	Presenter
2007	Adventures in Hollyhood	Himself	
2008	WWE Raw	Himself	1 episode
2008	Jackassworld.com: 24 Hour Takeover	Himself	TV special Executive producer
2008	Family Guy	Himself	Voice; Episode: "The Man with Two Brians"
2008	King of the Hill	Hoyt Platter	Voice; 1 episode
2008	Unhitched	Chuck	
2009	Dogg After Dark	Himself	
2009	Dancing with the Stars	Himself	3 episodes
2009	Rob Dyrdek's Fantasy Factory	Himself	1 episode
2009	Nitro Circus	Himself	10 episodes Co-creator and executive producer
2009	Steve-O: Demise and Rise	Himself	TV movie documentary
2009	The Goode Family	Dean Stansel	1 episode
2010	The Dudesons	Himself	1 episode
2010	The Dudesons in America	Himself	3 episodes Producer
2010	WWE Raw	Himself	1 episode
2010	2010 MTV Video Music Awards	Himself	Presenter
2010	2010 MTV Europe Music Awards	Himself	Presenter
2011	Ridiculousness	Himself	1 episode
2011	A Tribute to Ryan Dunn	Himself	TV documentary Executive producer
2012–2024	SpongeBob SquarePants	Johnny Krill, Randy Cheeks	Voice; 2 episodes
2012–2013	Loiter Squad	Himself	2 episodes
2013	Conan	Himself	1 episode
2014	Guys Choice	Himself	Winner Guycon award
2014	Maron	Himself	1 episode
2014	CKY: The Greatest Hits	Himself	TV special
2014–2018	Drunk History	Various	4 episodes
2017	Epicly Later'd: Bam Margera	Himself	TV documentary
2020	Unbreakable Kimmy Schmidt	C.J.	Special: "Kimmy vs the Reverend"
2021	Jackass Shark Week	Himself	TV special Executive producer
2021	WWE SmackDown	Himself	1 episode Guest appearance
2022	UFC 270	Himself	Audience member
2022	WWE Day 1	Himself	video link
2022	Royal Rumble	Himself	Royal Rumble Participant
2022	Ridiculousness	Himself	1 episode
2022	WrestleMania 38	Himself	Participant
2022	The Orville	Actor No. 2	1 episode
2022	Jackass Shark Week 2.0	Himself	TV special Executive producer
2022	Reboot	Clay Barber	Main cast
2022	Celebrity Family Feud	Himself	Participant; Episode 9.11
2023	History of the World, Part II	Grigori Rasputin	3 episodes
2023	Agent Elvis	Bobby Ray	Voice
2023	The Prank Panel	Himself	Host; Executive producer
2023	Ride with Norman Reedus	Himself	1 episode
2025	The Studio	Himself	Episode: "The Pediatric Oncologist"
2025	The Last Frontier	S.T. Covington	3 episodes
2025	It's Florida, Man	Timmy the Tweaker	Episode: "Moonshine"
2025	The Simpsons	Himself	Voice; Episode: "¡The Fall Guy-Yi-Yi!"
2026	Fear Factor: House of Fear	Himself	Host
2026	The Masked Singer	Himself	1 episode

=== Video games ===
Year	Title	Role	Notes
2007	Jackass: The Game	Himself	Voice and motion capture
2022	Jackass Human Slingshot	Himself	Voice; Mobile game

=== Music videos ===
Year	Artist	Track	Role	Notes
2002	CKY	"Flesh Into Gear"	Himself	Archived footage
2002	Andrew W.K.	"We Want Fun"	Himself	
2003	Roger Alan Wade	"If You're Gonna Be Dumb, You Gotta Be Tough"	Himself	Cameraman
2006	Wolfmother	"Joker & the Thief"	Himself	
2006	Chris Pontius	“Karazy”	Himself	
2010	Weezer	"Memories"	Himself	
2022	French Cassettes	"On/Off"	Heist Boss	
2022	Queen Kwong	"Sad Man"	Lieutenant	

=== Web series ===
Year	Title	Role	Notes
2015	Jackass Reunion: 15 Years Later	Himself	Rolling Stone special
2018	Hot Ones	Himself	1 episode
2021	Actually Me	Himself	1 episode
2022	Sneaker Shopping	Himself	1 episode
2022	Battle Scars	Himself	1 episode
2022	According to Google	Himself	1 episode
2022	Steve-O's Wild Ride!	Himself	Podcast; 1 episode
2022	Autocomplete Interview	Himself	1 episode
2022	Wikipedia: Fact or Fiction?	Himself	1 episode
2022	The Shittiest Podcast	Himself	Podcast; 1 episode
2023	Steve-O's Wild Ride!	Himself	Podcast; 1 episode
2023	Pretty Sure I Can Fly	Himself	Host; Podcast
2024	TigerBelly	Himself	Podcast; 1 episode
2026	Last Meals	Himself	1 episode
2026	Let It Kill You: Jeff Tremaine	Himself	Documentary
2026	Jackass: The Podcast	Himself	Host; Co-creator
2026	Hot Ones: Wing Pong	Himself	1 episode

== Awards and nominations ==
Year	Award	Category	Work	Result
2001	Teen Choice Awards	Choice TV Personality	Jackass	Nominated
2003	MTV Movie Awards	Best Comedic Performance	Jackass: The Movie	Nominated
2003	MTV Movie Awards	Best On-Screen Team	Jackass: The Movie (shared)	Nominated
2003	MTV Movie Awards	Best Fight	Johnny Knoxville vs. Butterbean Jackass: The Movie	Nominated
2005	Teen Choice Awards	Choice Movie: Sleazebag	Lords of Dogtown	Nominated
2006	MTV Movie Awards	Best On-Screen Team	The Dukes of Hazzard (shared)	Nominated
2014	American Comedy Awards	Comedy Actor Film	Jackass Presents: Bad Grandpa	Nominated
2014	MTV Movie Awards	#WTF Moment	Jackass Presents: Bad Grandpa (shared)	Nominated
2014	MTV Movie Awards	Best Comedic Performance	Jackass Presents: Bad Grandpa	Nominated
2014	Teen Choice Awards	Choice Movie Actor: Comedy	Jackass Presents: Bad Grandpa	Nominated
2022	MTV Movie & TV Awards	Best Comedic Performance	Jackass Forever	Nominated
