= Ehren McGhehey =

American stunt performer and actor (born 1976)

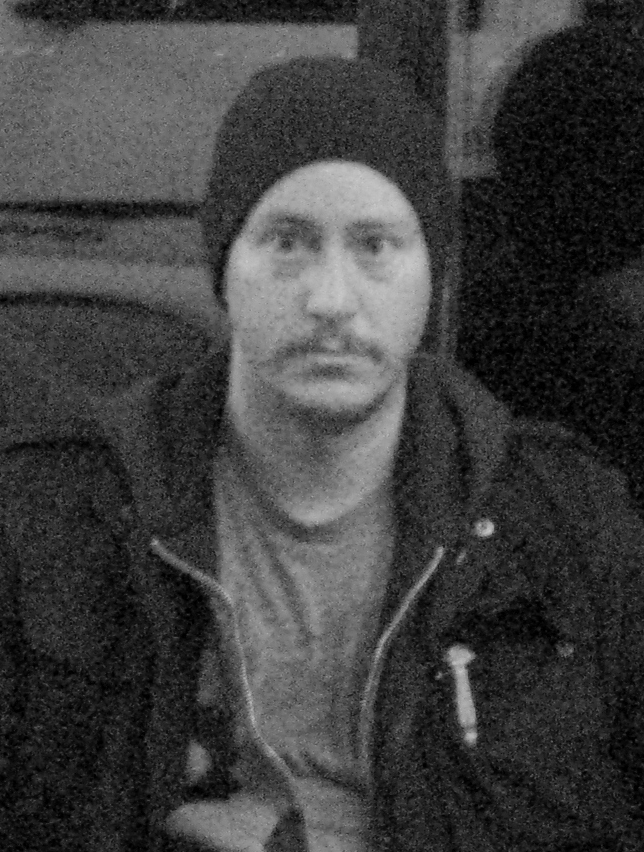
- McGhehey in 2010
- Born: Kenneth Ehren McGhehey; November 29, 1976 (age 49); McMinnville, Oregon, U.S.
- Other name: Danger Ehren
- Occupations: Stunt performer; actor
- Years active: 2000–present
- Known for: Co-star of Jackass
- Children: 1

Kenneth Ehren McGhehey (born November 29, 1976), also known professionally as Danger Ehren, is an American stunt performer and actor. He is best known as one of the cast members of the MTV reality stunt show Jackass (2000–2001), later appearing in subsequent films during the franchise's 26-year-long run.

== Early life ==
Kenneth Ehren McGhehey was born on November 29, 1976, in McMinnville, Oregon, and grew up living over a mortuary. By the age of 12, he was an accomplished skateboarder, and later became a professional snowboarder, breaking his neck, shoulder, and knees in the process. While working at a skate shop in Portland, Oregon, McGhehey began filming stunts, leading to his involvement with Jackass.

== Career ==
McGhehey appeared in all three seasons of the Jackass television series and five Jackass films, often going by the nickname "Danger Ehren." He has been the subject of many pranks by the Jackass crew, most notably in the infamous "Terror Taxi" skit from Jackass Number Two (2006), one of Johnny Knoxville's favorites. In the stunt, McGhehey was dressed as a stereotypical Muslim terrorist with the idea being to startle a taxi driver; part of his costume involved him having a beard glued to his face that was made out of shaved pubic hair contributed by the entire crew. In a podcast with Steve-O, McGhehey suggested some of those jokes amounted to bullying, and that some of it happened off-camera.

McGhehey has been the recipient of some of the most dangerous injuries in the Jackass franchise, including breaking his neck twice during the filming of Jackass 3D (2010), a broken orbital bone when his healthy tooth was pulled out by a string tied to Bam Margera's Lamborghini in Jackass 3D, and rupturing his right testicle after Dave England jumped on his scrotum with a pogo stick in Jackass Forever (2022). Between his snowboarding and Jackass careers, McGhehey said he had undergone 16 surgeries by the age of 33. He appeared in the final Jackass film of the franchise, Jackass: Best and Last (2026), as the show's 26-year run concluded.

== Filmography ==
=== Television ===
Year	Title	Role	Notes
2000–2001	Jackass	Himself	Writer; 24 episodes
2002	Jackass Backyard BBQ	Himself	TV special
2003	The New Tom Green Show	Himself	1 episode
2003	2003 MTV Movie Awards	Himself	Guest appearance
2007	Bam's Unholy Union	Himself	2 episodes
2008	Jackassworld.com: 24 Hour Takeover	Himself	TV special
2010	2010 MTV Video Music Awards	Himself	Presenter
2010	2010 MTV Europe Music Awards	Himself	Presenter
2010	Late Night with Jimmy Fallon	Himself	1 episode
2010	Up Close with Carrie Keagan	Himself	1 episode
2010	Made in Hollywood	Himself	Episode 6.4
2011	A Tribute to Ryan Dunn	Himself	TV documentary
2012–2016	Portlandia	Motorcycle guy	5 episodes
2014–2017	Ridiculousness	Himself	2 episodes
2016	Grimm	Luke Virkler	Episode 5.16
2022	Celebrity Family Feud	Himself	Participant; Episode 9.11
2022	Prestige Wrestling: Roseland 4 Wake the Dead	Himself	Participant
2023	Below Deck Mediterranean	Himself	2 episodes

=== Film ===
Year	Title	Role	Notes
2002	Jackass: The Movie	Himself	Writer
2003	Grind	Rival skater	
2005	Dishdogz	Fired dishwasher	
2006	National Lampoon's TV: The Movie	Jimmy Gonzales	
2006	Jackass Number Two	Himself	Writer
2007	Jackass 2.5	Himself	Writer
2008	Paranoid Park	Himself	Uncredited
2009	Jackass: The Lost Tapes	Himself	Archived footage
2010	Jackass 3D	Himself	Writer
2011	Jackass 3.5	Himself	Writer
2014	All Hell Breaks Loose	Clarence	Executive producer
2020	Steve-O: Gnarly	Himself	Direct-to-video; Guest appearances
2022	Jackass Forever	Himself	Writer
2022	Jackass 4.5	Himself	Writer
2023	Steve-O's Bucket List	Himself	Direct-to-video; Guest appearance
2026	Jackass: Best and Last	Himself	Writer; Co-producer

=== Web series ===
Year	Title	Role	Notes
2015	Jackass Reunion: 15 Years Later	Himself	Rolling Stone special
2019	Bathroom Break Podcast	Himself	Guest; 1 episode
2021–2022	Steve-O's Wild Ride!	Himself	Guest; 2 episodes Podcast
2026	Jackass: The Podcast	Himself	Guest; 2 episodes

=== Music videos ===
Year	Artist	Track	Role	Notes
2002	CKY	"Flesh Into Gear"	Himself	Archived footage
2002	Andrew W.K.	"We Want Fun"	Himself	
2006	Chris Pontius	"Karazy"	Himself	
2010	Weezer	"Memories"	Himself	
2015	Modest Mouse	"The Ground Walks, With Time in a Box"	The Foe	
2017	Municipal Waste	"Breathe Grease"	Biker	
2018	Dwarves	"Devil's Level"	Wrestler	
2021	Red Fang	"Rabbits in Hives"	Grave digger	

== Video games ==
Year	Title	Role	Notes
2007	Jackass: The Game	Himself	Voice and motion capture
