= Dave England =

American stunt performer (born 1969)

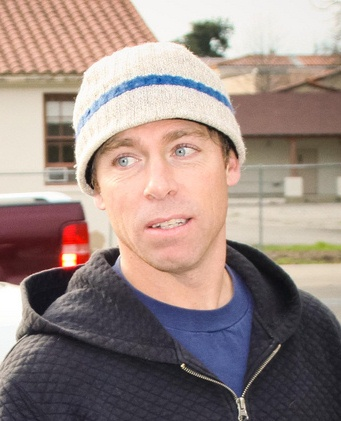
- England in 2011
- Born: David Joseph England; December 30, 1969 (age 56); Ojai, California, U.S.
- Other names: Darf; Jackson Schmackson
- Occupation: Stunt performer
- Years active: 1991–present
- Known for: Co-star of Jackass
- Children: 4

David Joseph England (born December 30, 1969) is an American stunt performer, television personality, and former professional snowboarder. He is best known as one of the stars of the MTV reality slapstick comedy stunt show Jackass and its subsequent movie franchise.

== Career ==
England was once a professional snowboarder and is featured in several of Kingpin Productions' snowboarding videos, including "Bulletproof" and "Back in Black". He was founder of the snowboarding magazine Skintight Magazine. He once worked as the field editor for Snowboarder Magazine and was the editor of Blunt magazine, the sister snowboarding magazine to skateboarding's Big Brother. England also appears in the 2008 film Shred, co-starring Tom Green. The film, about a snowboarding school run by England's character, was filmed at the Big White ski resort in Canada.

=== Jackass ===
England gets involved in stunts and pranks much like the rest of the cast, but he is the first one to participate in something when fecal matter is involved. England proclaimed on the Jackass Number Two (2006) DVD commentary that he is the "world's first professional shitter" because he gets paid to defecate on camera.

In Jackass 2.5 (2007), England jokingly claims that he is the only proven person in the world that is capable of defecating and even vomiting on command, although he finds urinating on command to be difficult.

In one stunt on Jackass, England eats a number of uncooked ingredients that he thinks would be suitable for making an omelette. He then forces himself to become sick by eating raw eggs and proceeds to vomit into a bowl, which he then fries in a pan. Finally, he and Steve-O, very enthusiastically, eat the omelette he has just "made." One of England's skits ("Poo Diaper") almost did not make it to TV. This skit involves England reaching into a garbage can and eating out of a baby's diaper containing chocolate pudding. Johnny Knoxville told MTV to keep the skit, and after many debates, MTV let Jackass keep "Poo Diaper".

== Personal life ==
England is married to Shawna England, with whom he has two sons, named Van and Clyde. He also has two children from a previous relationship. As mentioned in Jackass 3.5 (2011), England has a reputation for turning into 'Darf', his drunken ill-tempered persona, when he drinks alcohol to excess. He has spent brief periods in jail in the United States, New Zealand, and Japan.

During the Bathroom Break Podcast with former Jackass and CKY crew member Chris Raab in February 2019, England stated he lost one of his testicles after suffering a double hernia during a snowboard accident in New Zealand in 1997. In the film Jackass: Best and Last (2026), the cast had attempted to replace England's missing testicle with an artificial one that illuminates.

== Filmography ==
=== Television ===
Year	Title	Role	Notes
2000-2001	Jackass	Himself	25 episodes Writer
2002	Jackass Backyard BBQ	Himself	TV special Archive footage
2003	Jackass Winterjam	Himself	TV special
2007	Bam's Unholy Union	Himself	2 episodes
2007	Tom Green Live!	Himself	1 episode
2007	Guys Choice	Himself	Winner Cockiest Award
2008	Jackassworld.com: 24 Hour Takeover	Himself	TV special
2010	2010 MTV Video Music Awards	Himself	Presenter
2010	2010 MTV Europe Music Awards	Himself	Presenter
2010	Up Close with Carrie Keagan	Himself	1 episode
2010	Made in Hollywood	Himself	Episode 6.4
2011	Attack of the Show!	Himself	1 episode Guest appearance
2011	A Tribute to Ryan Dunn	Himself	TV documentary
2012	Loiter Squad	Himself	Episode 1.10
2014	2014 Kids' Choice Awards	Himself	Rodeo performer
2015	Swerved	Himself	Episode 1.6
2016	Party Legends	Himself	Episode 1.5
2016	Ridiculousness	Himself	Episode 8.24
2021	WWE SmackDown	Himself	Episode 24.10; Guest appearance
2022	Celebrity Family Feud	Himself	Participant; Episode 9.11

=== Film ===
Year	Title	Role	Notes
1996	Big Brother: shit		Direct-to-video; Creative consultant
1998	Number Two: Big Brother	Himself	Direct-to-video
2002	Jackass: The Movie	Himself	Writer
2002	Don't Try This At Home: The Steve-O Video Vol. 2: The Tour	Himself	Cameo; Direct-to-video
2003	Steve-O: Out on Bail	Himself	Direct-to-video; Guest appearance
2006	Jackass Number Two	Himself	Writer
2007	Jackass 2.5	Himself	Writer
2008	Shred	Max Fisher	
2009	Revenge of the Boarding School Dropouts	Max Fisher	
2009	Jackass: The Lost Tapes	Himself	Writer; Archived footage
2010	Jackass 3D	Himself	Writer
2011	Jackass 3.5	Himself	Writer
2016	Natural Born Pranksters	Himself	Guest appearance
2016	The Bet	Coffee shop employee	
2020	Steve-O: Gnarly	Himself	Direct-to-video; Guest appearance
2022	Jackass Forever	Himself	Writer
2022	Jackass 4.5	Himself	Writer
2023	Steve-O's Bucket List	Himself	Direct-to-video; Guest appearances
2026	Jackass: Best and Last	Himself	Writer; Co-producer

=== Web series ===
Year	Title	Role	Notes
2008	Hardly Working	Himself	1 episode: "Jackass"
2015	Jackass Reunion: 15 Years Later	Himself	Rolling Stone special
2019	Bathroom Break Podcast	Himself	Guest; 1 episode
2021-2022	Steve-O's Wild Ride!	Himself	Guest; 2 episodes Podcast
2022	The Shittiest Podcast	Himself	Guest; 1 episode
2022	The Nine Club	Himself	Guest; 1 episode Podcast
2024	The Pontius Show	Himself	Guest; 1 episode Podcast
2026	Jackass: The Podcast	Himself	Guest; 2 episodes

=== Music videos ===
Year	Artist	Track	Role	Notes
2002	CKY	"Flesh into Gear"	Himself	Archived footage
2002	Andrew W.K.	"We Want Fun"	Himself	
2006	Wolfmother	"Joker & the Thief"	Himself	
2006	Chris Pontius	"Karazy"	Himself	
2010	Weezer	"Memories"	Himself	
2016	DJ Swamp	"Rock Rollin"	Skateboarder	

== Video games ==
Year	Title	Role	Notes
2007	Jackass: The Game	Himself	Voice and motion capture
