= Rachel Wolfson =

American television and comedy actress, and stuntwoman (born 1987)

- Born: January 23, 1987 (age 39); Las Vegas, Nevada, U.S.
- Other name: Wolfie
- Education: Lynn University (MA)
- Occupations: Comedian; actress; stuntwoman
- Years active: 2016–present
- Known for: Jackass Forever
- Website: rachelwolfsoncomedy.com

Rachel Wolfson (born January 23, 1987) is an American television actress, comedian and stuntwoman. She is the second female of the main cast of the comedy series Jackass. She starred in Jackass Forever (2022) and appeared in Jackass: Best and Last (2026).

== Early life and education ==
Rachel Wolfson was born on January 23, 1987 in Las Vegas, Nevada, the daughter of Clark County prosecutor, district attorney Steve B. Wolfson, and former district court judge, Jackie Glass. Glass was the sitting judge who sentenced O. J. Simpson to 33 years in prison in his 2008 robbery case. Glass also hosted the HLN court show Swift Justice with Jackie Glass from 2011 to 2012. Wolfson has one sister, Rebecca. She is Jewish, and stated that she had a strict upbringing.

Wolfson studied at Lynn University in Florida, graduating with a Master of Arts in communications and marketing.

== Career ==
Wolfson moved to Los Angeles in 2013 to pursue a career in comedy. She had performed stand-up comedy in locations, such as the L.A. Comedy Club and the Laugh Factory at the Tropicana.

=== Marijuana activism ===
Wolfson runs a YouTube channel, The Budd, which is about smoking marijuana. In college, she began smoking cannabis recreationally, later establishing her YouTube channel and own podcast about marijuana. She also starred on Snoop Dogg's media platform Merry Jane in 2017, being described as the "Ultimate Millennial Stoner Girl".

=== Jackass ===
Wolfson starred in Jackass Forever (2022), the second and final woman to star in the franchise (after Stephanie Hodge), and first and only woman to star in the movie franchise. According to director and producer Jeff Tremaine, she was recruited to the franchise after Johnny Knoxville saw her Instagram in 2019 and thought she was funny. A self-described "MTV kid", she participated in multiple stunts in the film, including licking a taser and being stung on the lips by a scorpion. After filming, she praised the on-set culture.

The film was released theatrically on February 4, 2022, and was received well by critics. She also appeared in Jackass 4.5 (2022) and Jackass: Best and Last (2026).

== Personal life ==
Wolfson was diagnosed with ADHD at five years old, and later diagnosed with bipolar disorder at 12 years old. Initially, she was prescribed Adderall and Ritalin to help treat her ADHD, and prescribed lithium for treatment of her bipolar disorder, but later said in an interview with Forbes that "for as long as I could remember, the pills never made me feel right. I was supposed to be taking something to make me feel better but it only made me feel worse."

In 2024, she quit smoking marijuana and tobacco for health reasons.

== Filmography ==
=== Films ===
Year	Title	Role	Notes
2022	Jackass Forever	Herself	New cast member Writer
2022	Jackass 4.5	Herself	Writer
2026	Jackass: Best and Last	Herself	Writer

=== Television ===
Year	Title	Role	Notes
2022	UFC 270	Herself	Spectator
2022	The Kelly Clarkson Show	Herself	Guest; 1 episode
2022	Entertainment Tonight	Herself	1 episode
2022	Dish Nation	Herself	1 episode
2022	Jimmy Kimmel Live!	Herself	Guest; 1 episode
2022	Watch What Happens Live with Andy Cohen	Herself	Guest; 1 episode
2022	Celebrity Family Feud	Herself	Participant; Episode 9.11
2023	Ridiculousness	Herself	4 episodes
2023	The Prank Panel	Various	8 episodes

=== Web series ===
Year	Title	Role	Notes
2022	Wild Ride! with Steve-O	Herself	1 episode Podcast
2022	The Shittiest Podcast	Herself	1 episode
2026	Hot Ones: Wing Pong	Herself	1 episode
