= Jackass Forever =

2022 American reality comedy film

- Theatrical release poster
- Directed by: Jeff Tremaine
- Based on: Jackass by: Jeff Tremaine; Spike Jonze; Johnny Knoxville
- Produced by: Jeff Tremaine; Spike Jonze; Johnny Knoxville
- Starring: Johnny Knoxville; Steve-O; Chris Pontius; Dave England; Danger Ehren; Wee Man; Preston Lacy; Poopies; Zach Holmes; Jasper; Eric Manaka; Rachel Wolfson
- Cinematography: Dimitry Elyashkevich
- Edited by: Matthew Kosinski; Matthew Probst; Sascha Stanton-Craven
- Music by: Joseph Shirley
- Production companies: MTV Entertainment Studios; Dickhouse Entertainment
- Distributed by: Paramount Pictures
- Release dates: February 1, 2022 (Hollywood); February 4, 2022 (United States)
- Running time: 96 minutes
- Country: United States
- Language: English
- Budget: $10 million
- Box office: $80.5 million

Jackass Forever (stylized as jackass fore♥er) is a 2022 American reality slapstick comedy film directed by Jeff Tremaine, who produced it with Spike Jonze and Johnny Knoxville, and released by Paramount Pictures. It is the fourth main installment in the Jackass film series, following Jackass 3D (2010).

The film stars original Jackass members Knoxville, Steve-O, Dave England, Wee Man, Danger Ehren, Chris Pontius, Preston Lacy, as well as newcomers Sean "Poopies" McInerney, Zach Holmes, Jasper Dolphin, Eric Manaka, Rachel Wolfson, the Jackass film crew, and celebrity guests. This is the first Jackass film not to feature Ryan Dunn following his death in 2011 and the first without Bam Margera being a primary cast member as he was fired during production, appearing in only one skit.

Jackass Forever premiered at the Chinese Theatre in Hollywood, California, on February 1, 2022, and was theatrically released on February 4. The film was well received by critics, with many considering it the best film of the franchise. It was also a commercial success, grossing over $80 million worldwide against a budget of $10 million.

Unused footage from the film was compiled separately, titled Jackass 4.5, and released on Netflix on May 20, 2022. A sequel, Jackass: Best and Last, was released on June 26, 2026.

== Synopsis ==
Jackass Forever is a compilation of stunts, skits and pranks intercut with on-set talking heads with its cast. The film begins with a tribute to kaiju cinema, in what appears to be a city being overrun by a giant green monster. In reality, it is Chris Pontius's penis painted green over a small set of a city, intercut with the cast members running through a life-size set of the same city. The intro ends with the "monster" bitten by a snapping turtle and Johnny Knoxville's intro, "Hello, I'm Johnny Knoxville! Welcome to Jackass!"

Stunts and pranks with the main cast include Knoxville facing a bull resulting in dangerous consequences; Dave England unsuspectingly getting pig semen dumped on him during a fake interview about the movie; Steve-O having his penis used as a beehive; Danger Ehren being subjected to painful tests with an athletic cup; Pontius's penis being used as the paddle for paddle ball; a vulture eating pieces of meat off Wee Man's body; and Preston Lacy's testicles being used as a miniature punching bag. The newcomers are also featured in many of the stunts and pranks, including Poopies trying to kiss a Texas rat snake; Jasper being shot off a ramp by large industrial fans while he's holding a parachute; Zach Holmes gliding down into a bed of cactuses; Eric Manaka riding a bicycle full speed into a false wall; and Rachel Wolfson having a scorpion sting her lips.

The final stunt, the Vomitron, features Zach, Dave, Eric, Poopies, Steve-O and Jasper drinking milk while strapped to a high-speed carousel. As they start vomiting, Knoxville and the rest of the cast initiate an attack involving paintball guns, a tennis machine and multiple explosions. After assuming the stunt is over, one big explosion is set off, surprising the victims of the stunt.

== Cast ==
The cast from the previous films return, with the exception of original Jackass member Ryan Dunn, who died in 2011, but does appear through archival footage in the end credits and the movie is seen as a tribute to him.

It is the first Jackass film to feature new main cast members. Bam Margera was terminated from production in August 2020, for breaking his contract due to mandates related to substance abuse. However, he appears in one skit, "The Marching Band", filmed prior to his firing, as well as being seen in archival footage. Chris Raab, who was a recurring cast member in the Jackass TV show and in Jackass: The Movie, served as a camera operator in this movie.

- Johnny Knoxville
- Steve-O
- Chris Pontius
- Dave England
- Jason "Wee Man" Acuña
- "Danger Ehren" McGhehey
- Preston Lacy
- Sean "Poopies" McInerney
- Zach Holmes
- Jasper Dolphin
- Eric Manaka
- Rachel Wolfson

=== Guest appearances ===
- Compston "Dark Shark" Wilson
- Nick Merlino
- David Gravette
- Aaron "Jaws" Homoki
- Natalie Palamides
- Courtney Pauroso
- Jules Sylvester
- Rob Dyrdek
- Eric André
- Francis Ngannou
- Danielle O'Toole-Trejo
- P. K. Subban
- Tory Belleci
- Colson Baker
- Tyler, the Creator
- Brandon Leffler
- Michael Rooney
- Bam Margera
- Scott Handley
- Gary Leffew
- Parks Bonifay
- Arthur H. Spiegel III, producer Spike Jonze's father
- Lionel Boyce
- Axe Pontius, Chris Pontius's son

Cameos in the intro sequence include Errol Chatham, Alia Shawkat, Jalen Ramsey, Otmara Marrero, DJ Paul, Sean Malto, Mike Carroll, Breana Geering, Rick Howard, Travis "Taco" Bennett, Louie Anderson, Syd tha Kyd, Vincent Alvarez, and Tony Hawk.

=== Crew ===
A significant portion of the film's crew appears onscreen:

- Director and producer Jeff Tremaine
- Producer Spike Jonze
- Executive producers Shanna Zablow Newton, and Greg "Guch" Iguchi (who is also a cameraman for this movie)
- Consulting producer Trip Taylor
- Co-producer and cinematographer Dimitry Elyashkevich
- Co-producer and photographer Sean Cliver
- Camera operators Lance Bangs, Rick Kosick (who also serves as an associate producer) and Chris "Raab Himself" Raab
- Co-producer Knate Lee
- MTV producer Brent Stoller
- First assistant director Joe Osborne
- Boom operator Seamus Frawley
- Assistant property master Mike Kassak
- Stunt coordinator Charles Grisham

== Production ==
=== Development ===
In 2018, Johnny Knoxville said that he was open to making a fourth Jackass film that may feature some new cast members, "just to bring in some fresh blood into it". He said that he had continued to write ideas for stunts and that "a ton" have been set aside for the project, should it receive the green-light. In July 2019, recurring cast member Chris Raab said that he had interviewed the Jackass crew on his Bathroom Break podcast and noted that everyone was still open to a fourth film should Knoxville, Jeff Tremaine, and Spike Jonze agree. In late 2019, Knoxville met with Tremaine and released a 200-page document of concepts for a fourth Jackass film. They agreed to film for two days with the entire cast to determine "if it still feels right" to make Jackass 4. "Honestly, after just five minutes of filming, we were ready to commit to making a movie", Tremaine said. In September 2020, Steve-O had said he was surprised the film "even came to fruition".

During Knoxville's July 12, 2021, appearance on Jimmy Kimmel Live!, he revealed the film's title and showed the first official photos.

=== Casting ===
On May 25, Knoxville confirmed six new cast members: Jasper Dolphin of Odd Future, and one of the stars of Loiter Squad; Jasper's ex-convict father Compston "Dark Shark" Wilson, who made recurring guest appearances throughout the film; Eric Manaka, who had a role in Knoxville's film Action Point; stand-up comedian Rachel Wolfson; Zach Holmes from Too Stupid to Die; and surfer Sean "Poopies" McInerney who had previously appeared in the Jackass Shark Week special. The project was initially presented as a possible anniversary special, and the new cast were later told it would be a movie. John C. Reilly claimed that comedian Natalie Palamides was originally meant to be included in the cast, but was fired on the first day after she got into a physical altercation with Wee Man. Rapper Travis Scott was on set and took part in the final "Vomitron" bit, but was edited out after his fatal Astroworld concert incident.

=== Filming ===
Wee Man stated that the original plan was to film in different locations around the world, which was ultimately thwarted by the COVID-19 pandemic. He also claimed that Paramount Pictures used Jackass Forever to see how film studios could potentially resume filming during the pandemic. Because the majority of the film was filmed during the pandemic, all cast and crew members had to be tested for COVID-19 daily during filming. On January 6, 2022, Jeff Tremaine stated that all of the testing combined had a cost of "about over (sic) one million dollars".

Test filming began on December 10, 2019. During the two days of test filming, professional skateboarder Aaron "Jaws" Homoki broke his hand, and suffered a concussion. Principal photography started on March 3, 2020. On the first day of filming, the cast threw snakes on Margera in the dark in order to induce his fear of snakes. Two days after the movie was greenlit, Steve-O and Knoxville were hospitalized. Filming was halted in March 2020 due to the COVID-19 pandemic and resumed seven months later on October 19, 2020, with Dimitry Elyashkevich serving as cinematographer. Principal photography ended on December 18, 2020. The opening sequence was filmed in March 2021.

==== Bam Margera's firing ====
In January 2021, Bam Margera claimed that Paramount Pictures regarded him as a liability, owing to his behavior leading up to and during production. He indicated that Tremaine had fought with the studio to keep Margera in the film, but Margera was uncertain that Paramount was going to allow him to partake in filming.

During the delay of production due to the Covid lockdown, Bam Margera reportedly violated his contractual sobriety agreement. On February 11, Margera posted several videos to his Instagram account, in which he admitted to breaking his sobriety and claimed that he had been officially fired from the filming of Jackass 4. Throughout the video, Margera could be seen crying, vomiting, and alluding to having looked up "how to tie a noose" before his move to Oceanside, California. Margera alleged that Paramount had been forcing him to take antidepressants, submit to random urine tests, and to check into two rehabilitation facilities using his own money. He also expressed disdain for Tremaine, Knoxville, and Jonze before asking his fans to boycott the film. He then solicited his followers to send him money in order to film his own movie to compete with Jackass Forever. The videos were removed from Margera's Instagram account soon after being posted.

On May 25, 2021, Tremaine filed a temporary restraining order against Margera due to Margera's harassment of Tremaine and Knoxville via Instagram. Tremaine was granted an additional three-year restraining order, extended to Tremaine's wife and children, after Margera allegedly sent his family death threats.

On August 9, 2021, Margera filed a lawsuit against Knoxville, Jonze, and Tremaine, as well as against Paramount Pictures, MTV, Dickhouse Entertainment, and Gorilla Flicks, alleging that he was wrongfully fired from the film's production. Margera also said that the film makes use of contributions he made before his firing and is seeking an injunction on the October release of the film as a result. On January 12, 2022, Knoxville said that one scene Margera filmed will remain, despite the lawsuit. Both parties came to terms on a settlement after Margera asked to dismiss the lawsuit on April 14, 2022. The details of the settlement remain private.

=== Injuries ===
Wee Man said that out of all Jackass films, "this one hurt the most", due to the film consisting entirely of physical stunts with no hidden camera pranks in-between as respite. On December 15, 2020, it was reported that Knoxville and Steve-O had been hospitalized due to on-set injuries. Dave England broke one of his teeth after the "Toilet Geyser". Steve-O broke his collarbone in a stunt that was cut from theatrical release, but can be seen in the Blu-ray and DVD extras. Steve-O also lost both of his eyebrows in another scene that was cut from the film, but was shown in Jackass 4.5. Danger Ehren ruptured his right testicle after one of the "Cup Tests". Pro skateboarder Aaron "Jaws" Homoki severely burnt his right hand in another cut scene. Dave England also burnt his right hand during the opening sequence. Zach Holmes got an infection after he glided into the cactus patch. Cameraman and associate producer Rick Kosick broke his ankle during the opening sequence.

==== "The Magic Trick" ====
In the penultimate stunt of the film, called "The Magic Trick", Knoxville attempts to perform a magic trick for a bull, the bull flips him into the air, and he lands on the back of his head; he suffered a broken rib, a broken wrist, a concussion and a brain hemorrhage; he was unconscious for several minutes and failed a number of cognitive tests in the ambulance. Knoxville directly pointed at the incident as the impetus for his retirement from Jackass, with Steve-O explicitly calling the stunt "the end of Jackass". and that it was "not fun to watch Knoxville get hit in the head anymore"; he also repeatedly objected to filming the scene.

== Release ==
On December 19, 2019, Paramount Pictures scheduled the film for release on March 5, 2021. In April 2020, the release date was delayed to July 2, 2021. In July 2020, the film was delayed again to September 3, 2021 due to the COVID-19 pandemic. In April 2021, the film was delayed yet again to October 22, 2021. In September 2021, the film was delayed once more to February 4, 2022. The film had its world premiere at the Chinese Theatre in Hollywood, California, on February 1, 2022, and was released theatrically by Paramount Pictures on February 4, 2022.

=== Home media ===
The film became available on Paramount+ on March 22, 2022, and digitally on March 29, 2022, followed by a Blu-ray and DVD release on April 19, 2022. The Blu-ray, DVD and digital releases include 40 minutes of additional footage. It was broadcast on Showtime in the United States on August 21, 2022.

== Reception ==
=== Box office ===
Jackass Forever grossed $57.8 million in the United States and Canada, and $22.7 million in other territories, for a worldwide total of $80.5 million.

In the United States and Canada, Jackass Forever was released alongside Moonfall, and was projected to gross around $15 million from 3,604 theaters in its opening weekend, with Boxoffice Pro predicting a $22–32 million three-day debut. The film earned $9.6 million on its first day (including an estimated $1.65 million from Thursday night previews), increasing weekend predictions to $20 million. Around 300 theaters were closed on Thursday due to a winter storm affecting most of the Midwestern United States. Jackass Forever went on to debut with $23.2 million. It was the third Paramount film to finish first at the box office in its opening weekend during the COVID-19 pandemic, after A Quiet Place Part II and Scream. Social media monitor RelishMix credited the film's box office performance to a large online fanbase, positive word of mouth, and shoutouts to Margera, Knoxville's physical journey, and "memories of Jackass over 22 years". Box office analytics firm EntTelligence also noted the film's runtime of 96 minutes for increasing the number of showtimes in theaters. Deadline Hollywood mentioned the film's genre and the franchise's prevalence on TikTok as other contributing factors. The film made $8.1 million in its second weekend, $5.2 million in its third, $3.1 million in its fourth, $1.4 million in its fifth, and $1.1 million in its sixth. The film dropped out of the box office top ten in its seventh weekend, finishing twelfth with $510,117.

Outside the US and Canada, the film grossed $5.2 million from nine markets, including $2.8 million in the UK and $1.8 million from Australia, the latter opening in first place at the box office while the film finished second in the UK, Norway, and New Zealand. The film earned $2.7 million in its second weekend, $2 million in its third, $1.7 million in its fourth, $767,000 in its fifth, $1.8 million in its sixth, $1.1 million in its seventh, and $585,000 in its eighth.

=== Critical response ===
On the review aggregator website Rotten Tomatoes, 86% of 172 critics' reviews are positive, with an average rating of 7/10. The website's consensus reads: "A gleefully gonzo franchise revival, Jackass Forever will make you worry more than ever for the cast's health and safety – but not enough to hold back the laughter." Metacritic, which uses a weighted average, assigned the film a score of 74 out of 100, based on 40 critics. It is the highest rated Jackass film on both websites. Audiences polled by CinemaScore gave the film an average grade of "B+" on an A+ to F scale, while those at PostTrak gave it an 86% positive score, with 67% saying they would definitely recommend it.

Owen Gleiberman of Variety wrote: "the team have not slacked off in their mission to create what are basically the world's most stupidly elaborate frat-house hazing stunts, and to stage them with a juvenile masochistic fervor that lies somewhere between psychotic and religious". David Fear of Rolling Stone gave it four out of five and wrote: "Forget the title: Jackass can't go on forever. Just enjoy one last chance to see these beautiful fuck-ups do what they do best before they limp and hobble off into the sunset."

In June 2025, IndieWire ranked the film at number 27 on its list of "The 100 Best Movies of the 2020s (So Far)."

== Jackass 4.5 ==
In a 2021 interview on The Film Stage, Jeff Tremaine was asked if Eric André would make an appearance in Jackass Forever after collaborating on Bad Trip (2021): "Maybe Eric's in it. If he's not, he'll be in Jackass 4.5," Tremaine said. Ehren said they had filmed so much for Jackass Forever and ended up with two films worth of footage. He also said that Jackass 4.5 would be similar to Jackass 2.5 (2007), and Jackass 3.5 (2011), consisting of behind-the-scenes, unused footage, outtakes, and interviews with the cast and crew members. Chris Pontius stated that Jackass 4.5 would be released on Netflix, which Johnny Knoxville later confirmed. Preston Lacy and Steve-O said that it would be available on Netflix until 2024, and move to Paramount+ afterwards. It was released on May 20, 2022.

The most notable added bits include: Johnny Knoxville, disguised as Irving Zisman, ringing the fire alarm of a retirement home in front of his unsuspecting caretaker; Steve-O having his eyebrows waxed off by a raptor and letting another raptor eat fish out of his anus; Dave England throwing a brick tied to his penis from a scaffold; Wee Man unsuspectingly getting horse semen dumped on him in a similar fashion to what happened to England; Preston Lacy getting shot in the stomach by a tennis ball from an elephant gun; Ehren McGhehey having a bowling ball thrown against his nuts by a professional bowler as part of the "Cup Tests"; Poopies standing on a stepladder and hitting it with a sledgehammer saying he'll show him; Jasper Dolphin getting hit on the head by a boxing glove attached to an arrow from a bow; Zach Holmes unsuspectingly getting shot with paint and glitters from an air pressure cannon while wearing a VR headset; and Rachel Wolfson, Chris Pontius, and Steve-O eating sashimi off Zach's sweaty body.

== Sequel ==
A sequel to Jackass Forever, titled Jackass: Best and Last, was released on June 26, 2026.
