= Zach Holmes =

American stunt performer (born 1991)

- Born: Zacharias Holmes; September 11, 1991 (age 35); Valparaiso, Indiana, U.S.
- Other name: Zackass
- Occupations: Stunt performer Television personality
- Years active: 2009–present
- Known for: Too Stupid to Die; Jackass Forever

Zacharias Holmes (born September 11, 1991), also known as Zackass, is an American stunt performer and television personality. He is best known as the star and co-creator of MTV's Too Stupid to Die (2018), and new Jackass member in Jackass Forever (2022).

== Career ==
Holmes started off his career by uploading stunt videos to YouTube. Some of these stunts included him shocking his lips with two stun guns, shooting a flare at his own crotch with a flare gun, and wearing a firecracker vest and igniting it. A few of his videos went viral, but after getting terminated from YouTube three times, he decided to upload his stunts to Instagram.

His videos started getting a lot of recognition again and he even did a few stunts with Jackass stars Steve-O and Bam Margera. After the CEOs of video production company Gunpowder & Sky, Jude Harris and Van Toffler, saw the stunts Holmes did, they wanted to make a TV show out of it, which led to the creation of Too Stupid to Die (2018), with former Jackass and CKY crew member Chris Raab serving as cinematographer.

After the show ended in 2018, Holmes continued uploading more stunts to his Instagram account, which got the attention of the Jackass stars, who then put him on Jackass Forever (2022). Since 2021, he hosts a web series called Fail News on Snapchat with Rachel Wolfson, who was also a new member in Jackass Forever, and Chad Tepper, who was a co-star of Too Stupid to Die. In 2022, Holmes hosted a podcast titled What The Fudge? along with Vinny Imperati. He currently hosts a podcast titled Maximum Zach.

Holmes also appeared in Jackass: Best and Last, alongside the entire main cast of Jackass Forever. It was theatrically released on June 26, 2026.

He, and fellow new Jackass member Poopies will have a new show together, titled Sports Hurts. It is set to release on Amazon Prime Video in October 2026.

== Filmography ==
=== Television ===
Year	Title	Role	Notes
2017	Tosh.0	Himself	Episode 9.1
2018	2018 MTV Movie & TV Awards	Himself	Guest appearance
2018	2018 MTV Video Music Awards	Himself	Guest appearance
2018	Too Stupid to Die	Himself	8 episodes Co-creator; Executive producer
2018	Ridiculousness	Himself	Episode 12.7
2019	How Far Is Tattoo Far?	Himself	Episode 2.19
2021	WWE SmackDown	Himself	Episode 24.10; Guest appearance
2022	UFC 270	Himself	Audience member
2022	The Wrld on GCW (2022)	Himself	Guest appearance
2022	Your Pranks, Our Show	Himself	Writer; Co-creator
2022	Jackass Shark Week 2.0	Himself	TV special
2022	Celebrity Family Feud	Himself	Participant; Episode 9.11
2023	The Eric Andre Show		Creative consultant (2 episodes)
2026	Sports Hurts	Himself	8 episodes

=== Films ===
Year	Title	Role	Notes
2021	Don't Look Up	#LaunchChallenge MeTuber	Uncredited
2022	Jackass Forever	Himself	New cast member Writer
2022	Jackass 4.5	Himself	Writer
2026	Jackass: Best and Last	Himself	Writer

=== Web series ===
Year	Title	Role	Notes
2018	Fear Pong	Himself	1 episode
2019	Bathroom Break Podcast	Himself	1 episode
2021–	Fail News	Himself	Host; Co-creator
2021–2022	Tales From the Trip	Himself	2 episodes
2022	What The Fudge?	Himself	Host; Co-creator; Podcast
2022	Howie Mandel Does Stuff	Himself	1 episode Podcast
2022	Steve-O's Wild Ride!	Himself	1 episode Podcast
2022	Super Mega Cast	Himself	1 episode Podcast
2023	The Shittiest Podcast	Himself	1 episode
2023–2025	Maximum Zach	Himself	Host; Creator; Podcast
2026	Jackass: The Podcast	Himself	Guest; 1 episode
