= Eric Manaka =

English stunt performer, actor, and writer (born 1999)

- Born: 9 December 1999 (age 26); South London, England
- Occupations: Stunt performer; actor; writer
- Known for: Jackass Forever

Eric Manaka (born 9 December 1999) is an English stunt performer, actor, and writer, who is best known for being a new Jackass member in Jackass Forever (2022).

== Career ==
Manaka, who originated as an athlete and artist, worked with Jackass members Johnny Knoxville, and Chris Pontius in the 2018 film Action Point.

=== Jackass ===
In May 2021, Knoxville announced that Manaka, along with four other people, will be the new cast members in Jackass Forever (2022). Manaka, as well as Jasper Dolphin, were the first people of colour to be on the main cast of Jackass. When asked about why he was a member of the Jackass franchise, Manaka stated, "I love skating, and I love getting a bit hurt." Like the other new cast members, Manaka also appeared in Jackass 4.5 (2022).

Manaka is the only new cast member who does not appear in any new footage in Jackass: Best and Last (2026). No reason why has been given yet. He did, however, attend the special screening of Jackass: Best and Last at BFI IMAX in London, England, on 15 June 2026, along with Knoxville, Pontius, and director and producer Jeff Tremaine.

== Filmography ==
=== Films ===
Year	Title	Role	Notes
2018	Action Point	Rodney	
2022	Jackass Forever	Himself	New cast member Writer
2022	Jackass 4.5	Himself	Writer
2023	How to Have Sex	Fi's Friend	
2026	Jackass: Best and Last	Himself	Archive footage
