= Sean McInerney (stunt performer) =

American stunt performer and surfer (born 1986)

- Born: Sean Patrick McInerney; October 21, 1986 (age 40); Redlands, California, U.S.
- Other name: Poopies
- Occupations: Stunt performer; surfer; YouTuber
- Years active: 2015–present
- Known for: Jackass Forever; Jackass: Best and Last

Sean Patrick McInerney (born October 21, 1986), better known as Poopies, is an American surfer, stunt performer, and YouTuber, best known as a new Jackass member in Jackass Forever (2022) and Jackass: Best and Last (2026), and the Who is J.O.B? web series.

== Early life ==
McInerney was born in Redlands, California, on October 21, 1986. He is of Irish descent. After his parents divorced, he moved to Carthage, Missouri with his mother, and went to the same elementary school as his future fellow Jackass member Preston Lacy, but many years apart. He earned the nickname Poopies in junior high after his classmates dared him to defecate in the middle of a street intersection, onto the oncoming traffic, while wearing a gorilla mask and gorilla gloves.

== Career ==
McInerney became known as professional surfer Jamie O'Brien's friend in Who is J.O.B? (2016–2018). In 2019, he got a call from Jackass producer Trip Taylor, whom Poopies has been friends with since he was 16. Trip told Poopies that they were looking for new cast members for a potential fourth Jackass movie. He then had a video call with Jackass creators Johnny Knoxville, and Jeff Tremaine, saying they wanted bring him on for a test shoot.

In May 2021, Knoxville officially announced that Poopies, along with four other people, will be the new cast members in Jackass Forever (2022).

He appeared in Jackass Shark Week, an extension of the Discovery Channel series Shark Week, in 2021. As a part of one of the stunts, McInerney attempted to jump over a series of sharks, in homage to the television series Happy Days. Missing the landing, he fell into the water, and was bitten on the left hand by one of the swarming sharks, becoming the first person ever bitten on Shark Week. He severed multiple tendons, ligaments, and muscles. Despite undergoing surgery and physical therapy, he was unable to regain full use of his hand. McInerney stated that he thought he was going to die during the shark attack, and he was left with an intense fear of sharks. He appeared on Jackass Shark Week 2.0 one year later to overcome his fear of sharks.

He started his own podcast titled The Shittiest Podcast. The first episode was uploaded to YouTube on 20 April 2022, with Knoxville as guest.

He won the Best Kiss Award at the 2022 MTV Movie & TV Awards for kissing a Texas rat snake in Jackass Forever. During the ceremony, he kissed a 5.20 meter (17 foot) long python.

He also appeared in Jackass: Best and Last, which was theatrically released on June 26, 2026.

He, and fellow new Jackass member Zach Holmes will have a new show together, titled Sports Hurts. It is set to release on Amazon Prime Video in October 2026.

== Personal life ==
McInerney has been open about his past struggles with addiction to alcohol, cocaine, and crystal meth, and had a near-fatal overdose during the last week of filming of Jackass Forever, but has since focused on recovery.

== Filmography ==
=== Films ===
Year	Title	Role	Notes
2022	Jackass Forever	Himself	New cast member Writer
2022	Jackass 4.5	Himself	Writer
2026	Jackass: Best and Last	Himself	Writer

=== Television ===
Year	Title	Role	Notes
2021	Jackass Shark Week	Himself	TV special
2021	Josh Gates Tonight	Himself	1 episode
2022	UFC 270	Himself	Spectator
2022	Ridiculousness	Himself	1 episode
2022	2022 MTV Movie & TV Awards	Himself	Winner Best Kiss Award
2022	Jackass Shark Week 2.0	Himself	TV special
2026	Sports Hurts	Himself	8 episodes

=== Web series ===
Year	Title	Role	Notes
2016–2018	Who Is J.O.B?	Himself	60 episodes
2022–2023	Wild Ride! with Steve-O	Himself	Podcast; Guest; 2 episodes
2022–2023	The Shittiest Podcast	Himself	Host; Podcast
2026	Jackass: The Podcast	Himself	Guest; 2 episodes
