= Preston Lacy =

American stunt performer (born 1969)

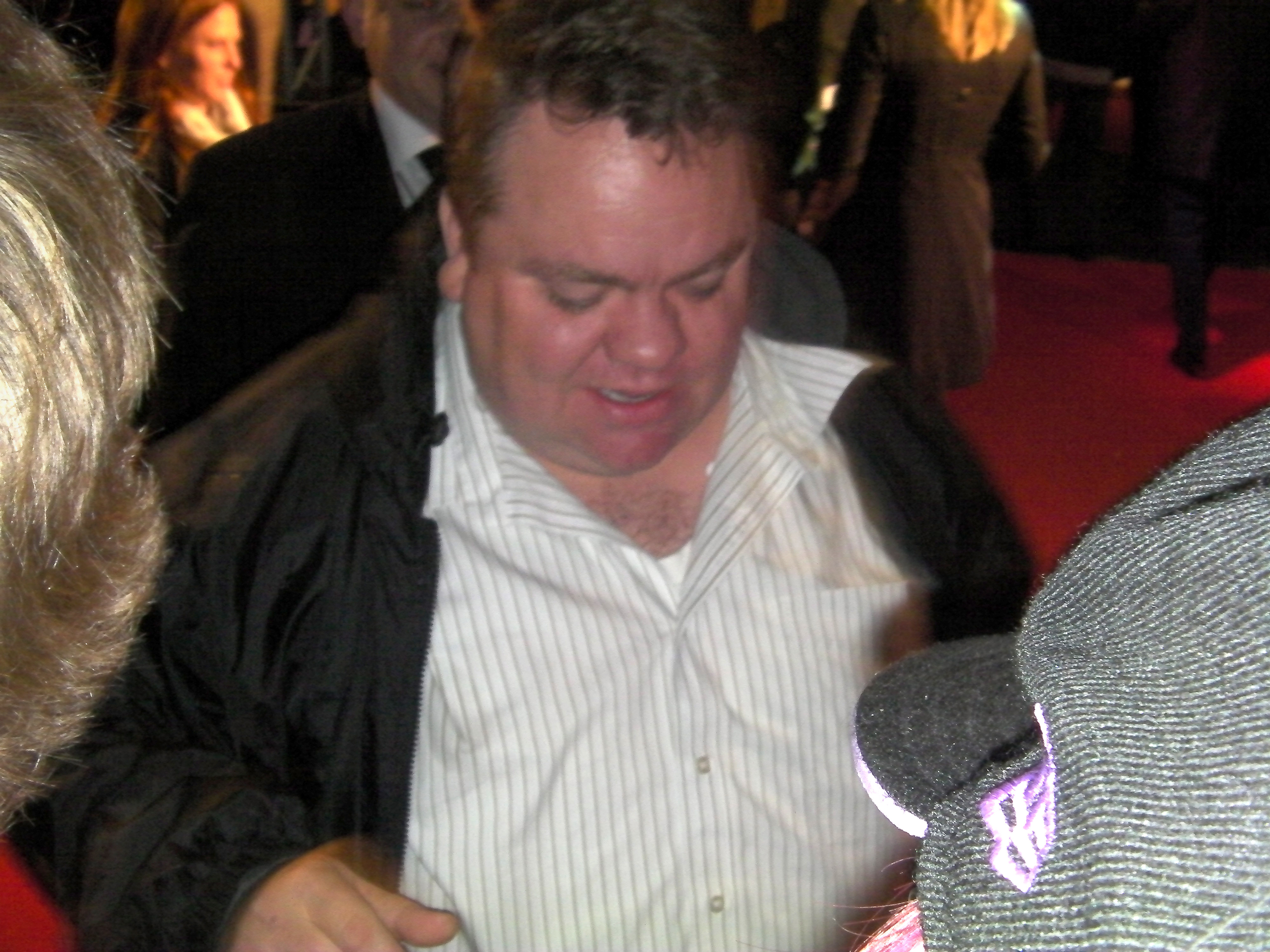
- Lacy at the Jackass 3D premiere in London, November 2010
- Born: August 14, 1969 (age 57); Carthage, Missouri, U.S.
- Occupations: Stunt performer, actor, comedian
- Years active: 1992–present
- Known for: Co-star of Jackass

Preston Lacy (born August 14, 1969) is an American stunt performer, actor, comedian and one of the stars of the reality stunt show Jackass.

== Career ==
Lacy was born on August 14, 1969, in Carthage, Missouri (Note: On a trading card, Lacy's birthplace was specified as Sarcoxie; Lacy himself stated he was born in Carthage.) and graduated from Neosho High School. He worked as a poultry handler, sewage technician, truck driver and for a construction crew in Missouri before moving to California. He landed roles in several commercials, including one for Napster that aired during Super Bowl XXXIX. Lacy first met Johnny Knoxville through Knoxville's ex-wife, who ran a clothing company. Lacy was hired to transport textiles for the clothing company. After becoming friends with Knoxville, Lacy began to suggest ideas for the Jackass series to him. Originally brought on as a writer, Knoxville convinced Lacy to participate in the stunts.

Lacy shares a writing credit for National Lampoon's TV: The Movie (2006). He starred alongside Chris Kattan in the film Christmas in Wonderland (2007). He appeared in Jackass: The Movie (2002), Jackass Number Two (2006), Jackass 2.5 (2007), Jackass 3D (2010), Jackass 3.5 (2011), Jackass Forever (2022), Jackass 4.5 (2022), and Jackass: Best and Last (2026).

Lacy has been on tour doing stand-up comedy. Notably, he has participated in the BBM Comedy Tours in New York and Florida, as well performing at festivals, clubs and bar rooms around the United States.

== Jackass ==
When on Jackass, Lacy is most often featured with Jason "Wee Man" Acuña and their most common skit involves Lacy chasing after Acuña down public streets in nothing more than their briefs and white tanktops, showcasing their size disparity. Lacy has contributed many of the ideas that later became Jackass skits and stunts. He is also known for his anger outbursts, the most memorable of which occurred during the "Eggnog Challenge" for the Jackass Christmas Special. In Jackass 2.5 (2007), it was revealed that Lacy has an extreme fear of heights.

== Filmography ==
=== Television ===
Year	Title	Role	Notes
1992	The Tonight Show with Jay Leno	Various	
1999	Captain Jackson	Billy Grill	1 episode
2000–01	Jackass	Himself	20 episodes Writer
2002	Jackass Backyard BBQ	Himself	TV special
2002	Mad TV	Himself	Episode 7.22
2003	2003 MTV Movie Awards	Himself	Guest appearance
2003	2003 MTV Europe Music Awards	Himself	Presenter
2004	Celebrities Uncensored	Himself	1 episode
2005	Home James	Himself	1 episode
2006	Tom Green Live!	Himself	Episode 1.29
2006	2006 Teen Choice Awards	Himself	TV special
2007	Bam's Unholy Union	Himself	Episode 1.7
2008	Jackassworld.com: 24 Hour Takeover	Himself	TV special
2010	2010 MTV Video Music Awards	Himself	Presenter
2010	2010 MTV Europe Music Awards	Himself	Presenter
2010	Up Close with Carrie Keagan	Himself	1 episode
2010	Made in Hollywood	Himself	Episode 6.4
2011	Attack of the Show!	Himself	1 episode Guest appearance
2011	A Tribute to Ryan Dunn	Himself	TV documentary
2012–14	Ridiculousness	Himself	2 episodes with Jason "Wee Man" Acuña
2022	Royal Rumble (2022)	Himself	Guest appearance
2022	Celebrity Family Feud	Himself	Participant; Episode 9.11
2023	History of the World, Part II	Russian Noble	3 episodes

=== Films ===
Year	Title	Role	Notes
2001	Don't Try This at Home: The Steve-O Video	Himself	Direct-to-video; Guest appearances
2002	Jackass: The Movie	Himself	Writer
2002	CKY4: The Latest & Greatest	Himself	Direct-to-video; Guest appearance
2002	Don't Try This at Home – The Steve-O Video Vol. 2: The Tour	Himself	Direct-to-video; Guest appearances
2003	Grind	Hefty Man	
2003	Steve-O: Out On Bail	Himself	Direct-to-video; Guest appearances
2006	National Lampoon's Pledge This!	Randy	
2006	National Lampoon's TV: The Movie	Various	Writer; Executive producer Second unit director Direct-to-video
2006	Jackass Number Two	Himself	Writer
2007	Jackass 2.5	Himself	Writer
2007	Christmas in Wonderland	Sheldon Cardoza	
2009	The Life of Lucky Cucumber	Forrest Fonda	Writer; Producer
2009	Jackass: The Lost Tapes	Himself	Writer; Archived footage
2010	Jackass 3D	Himself	Writer
2011	Jackass 3.5	Himself	Writer
2011	A Holiday Heist	Buzz	
2020	Guest House	Micky	
2020	Steve-O: Gnarly	Himself	Direct-to-video; Guest appearances
2022	Jackass Forever	Himself	Writer
2022	Jackass 4.5	Himself	Writer
2023	Steve-O's Bucket List	Himself	Direct-to-video; Guest appearances
2026	Jackass: Best and Last	Himself	Writer; Co-producer

=== Web series ===
Year	Title	Role	Notes
2008	Hardly Working	Himself	1 episode: "Jackass"
2015	Jackass Reunion: 15 Years Later	Himself	Rolling Stone special
2019	Bathroom Break Podcast	Himself	Guest; 1 episode
2022	Steve-O's Wild Ride!	Himself	Guest; 1 episode Podcast
2026	Jackass: The Podcast	Himself	Guest; 2 episodes

=== Music videos ===
Year	Artist	Track	Role	Notes
2001	Shaquille O'Neal	"Psycho"	Himself	Unreleased
2002	CKY	"Flesh Into Gear"	Himself	Archived footage
2002	Andrew W.K.	"We Want Fun"	Himself	
2006	Wolfmother	"Joker & the Thief"	Himself	
2006	Chris Pontius	"Karazy"	Himself	
2010	Weezer	"Memories"	Himself	

== Video games ==
Year	Title	Role	Notes
2007	Jackass: The Game	Himself	Voice and motion capture
