= Nöthin' But a Good Time: The Uncensored Story of '80s Hair Metal =

2024 documentary series by Jeff Tremaine

- Based on: Nöthin' But a Good Time by: Tom Beaujour; Richard Bienstock
- Directed by: Jeff Tremaine
- Starring: Bret Michaels; Steve-O; Corey Taylor; Tracii Guns; Don Dokken; Rudy Sarzo; Steve Riley; Kelly Nickels; Doc McGhee; Tom Zutaut; Alan Niven; Jack Russell
- Country of origin: United States
- Original language: English

Production
- Producers: Jeff Tremaine; Shanna Newton; Erik Olsen; Eric Wattenberg; Scott Lonker; Pam Healey; Will Nothacker; Bruce Gillmer; Michael Maniaci; Jennifer Welsh; Jeff Conroy; Richard Beinstock; Tom Beaujour
- Cinematography: Wyatt Troll
- Editors: Matthew Kosinski; Richie Carbill
- Running time: 45 minutes (per episode)

Original release
- Network: Paramount+
- Release: September 17, 2024

Nöthin' But a Good Time: The Uncensored Story of '80s Hair Metal is a 2024 documentary series directed by Jeff Tremaine. It is based on the 2021 book by Tom Beaujour and Richard Bienstock. The series documents the 80s glam metal music scene in Los Angeles.

== Synopsis ==
The three-part series follows the rise, dominance and decline of the hair metal genre during the 1980s and 1990s, and its subsequent resurgence during the 2000s. Based on the book "Nöthin' But a Good Time: The Uncensored Story of '80s Hair Metal" by Richard Bienstock and Tom Beaujour, the series is directed by Jackass creator Jeff Tremaine. The series features interviews and footage by multiple figures associated with the genre such as, Bret Michaels, Steve-O, Corey Taylor, Slash, Doc McGhee, Michael Starr, Roxy Petrucci, Michael Monroe, Stephen Pearcy, Taime Downe, Tommy Lee, Don Dokken, Alan Niven, Tom Zutaut, Ozzy Osbourne, and including the late Steve Riley and Jack Russell.

The series was produced by MTV Entertainment Studios and was released on Paramount+.

== Cast ==
- Richard Beinstock
- Tom Beaujour
- Rudy Sarzo
- Tracii Guns
- DeeDee Keel
- Doc McGhee
- Don Adkins
- Tom Zutaut
- Full Metal Jackie
- Billy Rowe
- Corey Taylor
- Steve Riley
- Kelly Nickels
- Don Dokken
- Al Zane
- Stephen Pearcy
- Warren DeMartini
- Jack Russell
- Mark Kendall
- Alan Niven
- Tom Werman
- Steve-O
- Mark Weiss
- Rick Krim
- Stevie Rachelle
- Riki Rachtman
- Bret Michaels
- Brian Forsythe
- Mark Canter
- Roxy Petrucci
- Steven Sweet
- Michael Starr
- Mike Tramp
- Phil Collen
- Slash
- Nuno Bettencourt
- Penelope Spheeris
- David Dimartino
- dUg
- Billy Rowe
- Michael Monroe
- Steven Adler
- Taime Downe
- Laina Dawes
- Snake Sabo
- Rachel Bolan
- Steve Brown
- Paul Taylor
- Reb Beach

=== Archival footage ===
- Randy Rhoads
- Kevin Dubrow
- Tommy Lee
- The Who
- KISS
- Robbin Crosby
- Ozzy Osbourne
- David Bowie
- The Clash
- Lemmy
- Hanoi Rocks
- David Lee Roth
- Warrant
- Bobbie Brown
- Sam Kinison
- Guns n' Roses
- Lita Ford
- Vixen
- Badlands
- Razzle
- Faster Pussycat
- Jetboy
- Izzy Stradlin
- David Geffen
- Mickey Rourke
- Robert Downey Jr.
- Nicolas Cage
- Kix
- Vince Neil
- Nirvana
- W.A.S.P.
- Jon Bon Jovi
- Sebastian Bach
- Journey
- Loverboy
- Sex Pistols
- Joan Jett
- Madam X
- The Darkness
- Scorpions
- Blondie
- Vain
- Odin
- Chris Holmes
- Mötley Crüe
