= All Hell Breaks Loose (film) =

- Directed by: Jeremy Garner
- Written by: The Vocabulariast
- Produced by: Jeremy Garner
- Starring: Nick Forrest; Sarah Kobel Marquette; Mike Bazanele; Todd A. Robinson; Tommy Hestmark; Joshua Lee Frazier; Ehren McGhehey
- Cinematography: Brett Roberts
- Edited by: Jeremy Garner; Kevin Robinson
- Music by: Chan Walrus
- Release date: 9 September 2014
- Running time: 92 minutes
- Country: United States
- Language: English

All Hell Breaks Loose is a 2014 American action comedy horror film directed by Jeremy Garner, starring Nick Forrest, Sarah Kobel Marquette, Mike Bazanele, Todd A. Robinson, Tommy Hestmark, Joshua Lee Frazier and Ehren McGhehey.

== Cast ==
- Nick Forrest as Nick
- Sarah Kobel Marquette as Bobby Sue
- Mike Bazanele as Tim
- Todd A. Robinson as Statch
- Tommy Hestmark as Pedophile Pete
- Joshua Lee Frazier as Sundown
- Ehren McGhehey as Clarence
- Leif Fuller as Jerimiah
- Ryan Gregg as Chuck
- Evan Hayes as Gas Station Attendant
- Hailey Henry as Jane
- Big Dave Levick as Knucklehead
- April Mai as Tina
- Hunter O'Guinn as El Vez
- William Ross as Sheriff Parks
- Jamison Smith as Earl
- Joseph Sullivan as The Cowboy
- Casey Vann as Ratso
- D.L. Watson as Haystack

== Reception ==
Amanda Hunt of Scream rated the film 5 stars out of 5 and wrote that she "loved this film for all its unequivocal blood lust, bad jokes, naked girlie action and over the top characters." Hunt praised the "tight" and "well-written" script, the performances, the direction and the characters.

Chris Coffel of Bloody Disgusting called the film a "fantastic gore-filled bike trip that harkens back to the biker flicks of the 70’s" and an "awesomely good time."

Kieran Fisher of Diabolique Magazine wrote that the film "succeeds through heart, passion and demented entertainment."

Mark L. Miller of Ain't It Cool News praised the "solid" gore but criticised the performances and the script.
