= Jackass: Best and Last =

2026 American reality comedy film

- Theatrical release poster
- Directed by: Jeff Tremaine
- Written by: Johnny Knoxville; Jeff Tremaine; Spike Jonze; Steve-O; Dave England; Tory Belleci; Greg Iguchi; Jack Haggerty; Ben Kaller; Shanna Zablow Newton; David Zellner
- Based on: Jackass by: Jeff Tremaine; Spike Jonze; Johnny Knoxville
- Produced by: Jeff Tremaine; Spike Jonze; Johnny Knoxville; Shanna Zablow Newton
- Starring: Johnny Knoxville; Steve-O; Chris Pontius; Wee Man; Dave England; Danger Ehren; Preston Lacy; Poopies; Zach Holmes; Jasper; Rachel Wolfson; Dark Shark
- Cinematography: Chris Darnell; Dimitry Elyashkevich (old footage)
- Edited by: Matthew Kosinski; Matthew Probst; Jeff Buchanan; Ian Kornbluth
- Production companies: MTV Entertainment Studios; Dickhouse Entertainment
- Distributed by: Paramount Pictures
- Release date: June 26, 2026 (United States)
- Running time: 92 minutes
- Country: United States
- Language: English
- Budget: $10 million
- Box office: $27.8 million

Jackass: Best and Last is a 2026 American reality slapstick comedy film directed by Jeff Tremaine and produced by Tremaine, Spike Jonze, Johnny Knoxville, and Shanna Zablow Newton. It is the fifth and final main installment in the Jackass film series, following Jackass Forever (2022).

The film stars original Jackass members Knoxville, Steve-O, Chris Pontius, Wee Man, Preston Lacy, Dave England, and Danger Ehren, along with Poopies, Zach Holmes, Jasper, and Rachel Wolfson, who all became new members in the previous Jackass film. Jasper's father Dark Shark, who made recurring guest appearances in Jackass Forever and Jackass 4.5 (2022), is also a main cast member in this movie.

It was released theatrically in the United States on June 26, 2026, by Paramount Pictures. The film received mostly positive reviews from critics. It has grossed $27.8 million.

== Synopsis ==
Jackass: Best and Last is a compilation of stunts, skits, and pranks, intercut with on-set talking heads with its cast. The movie is a mix of old and new footage, bringing back the biggest stunts and pranks from the franchise, as well as brand new ones, and never-before-seen footage.

The opening sequence begins in 1998 with a young Johnny Knoxville shooting himself in the chest with a .38 caliber gun while wearing a cheap bulletproof vest (Note: The footage was originally shot for Big Brother magazine and was only seen in Dumb: The Story of Big Brother Magazine; it is considered to be the catalyst for the creation of the Jackass TV series.); 28 years later follows the main cast performing to "Holding Out for a Hero" by Bonnie Tyler, in a fashion resembling the music video of "Virtual Insanity" by Jamiroquai. During the performance, each cast member participate in a stunt reminiscent of one of their previous iconic stunts, and ends with Wee Man hitting Knoxville in the groin with a giant wooden mallet.

Some of the old bits shown this film include; "Self Defense", Knoxville's first stunt filmed prior to Jackass; "Brad Pitt's Abduction" from the Jackass TV series; "Butt X-Ray" from Jackass: The Movie (2002); "Big Red Rocket" from Jackass Number Two (2006); "High Five" and "Poo Cocktail Supreme" from Jackass 3D (2010); the stripclub scene from Jackass Presents: Bad Grandpa (2013); and the "Magic Trick" and "Silence of the Lambs" from Jackass Forever (2022). The "Silence of the Lambs" bit in this film also includes previously unseen footage with Bam Margera.

Some of the new stunts include; Steve-O getting a painful prostate exam from a robot named Larry; Poopies getting his penis shocked by a shock collar while attempting to walk across a balance beam; and Wee Man, Dave England, Danger Ehren, and Dark Shark trying to escape an "escape room from hell".

The film ends similarly to the first film's opening, with the original cast members riding in a giant grocery cart, riding through several explosions. In its conclusion, the grocery cart crashes through a sign that reads "The End", rolls off a steep hill, and explodes at the bottom. The occupants are revealed to be puppets as the main cast watch the cart fall from afar.

The post-credits scene features Dave England playing with a door stopper, as seen on the TV series.

== Cast ==
The entire main cast of Jackass Forever (2022) returned for this film, with the exception of new cast member Eric Manaka.

- Johnny Knoxville
- Steve-O
- Chris Pontius
- Jason "Wee Man" Acuña
- Preston Lacy
- Dave England
- "Danger Ehren" McGhehey
- Sean "Poopies" McInerney
- Zach Holmes
- Jasper Dolphin
- Rachel Wolfson
- Compston "Dark Shark" Wilson

Original cast member Bam Margera, who was fired from the production of Jackass Forever and only appeared in one sketch, was invited but declined to participate in the film and only appears in this movie through archive footage, making this the only theatrical Jackass film without his involvement. Old footage of original cast member Ryan Dunn, who died in 2011, is also shown in this film. This is also the only theatrical Jackass film not to feature a guest appearance by professional skateboarder Tony Hawk.

=== Guest appearances ===
- Loomis Fall
- Tory Belleci
- Adam Ray
- Paul Walter Hauser
- Dr. Julie Mizener
- Ramy Elgazar
- Mark Gonzales
- Lauren Sesselmann
- Chris Arreola
- Tigi Hill

=== Crew ===
Film crew members who appear on screen

- Director and producer Jeff Tremaine
- Producers Spike Jonze, and Shanna Zablow Newton
- Executive producer and camera operator Greg "Guch" Iguchi
- Co-producer and cinematographer Dimitry Elyashkevich
- Co-producer and photographer Sean Cliver
- Camera operators Lance Bangs and Rick Kosick
- Photographer Ben "Benzo" Kaller
- Consulting producer Trip Taylor
- Co-producers Knate Lee, Greg Wolf, and Jennifer Welsh
- Boom operator Seamus Frawley

=== Archive footage ===
- Bam Margera
- Ryan Dunn
- Brandon DiCamillo
- Chris "Raab Himself" Raab
- Rake Yohn
- April Margera
- Phil Margera
- Manny Puig
- Jules Sylvester
- Eric Manaka
- Eric André
- Brad Pitt
- Terra Jolé
- Erik Roner
- Tony Hawk
- Mat Hoffman
- Butterbean
- Danielle O'Toole-Trejo
- Naoko Kumagai
- Jason Taylor
- Josh Brown
- Jared Allen
- Erik Ainge
- Seann William Scott
- Three 6 Mafia
- Rip Taylor

== Production ==
=== Development ===
On November 6, 2025, Steve-O said that they had a number of Zoom calls to discuss the 25th anniversary of Jackass. "What we landed on was a bit more ambitious than timely, but this next year, we're likely to see the Jackass franchise rear its ugly head", he said. Johnny Knoxville announced the film on his Instagram account on January 8, 2026. During his appearance on Jimmy Kimmel Live! on January 15, 2026, he said that he cannot do any stunts that can lead to a concussion anymore, as in Jackass Forever (2022), he got a broken rib, a broken wrist, a concussion, and brain hemorrhage during a stunt with a bull.

Steve-O said on his podcast that the movie will be a mix of old and new footage. He also said the movie will serve as a celebration of the entire franchise, bringing back the best bits of the TV show and previous movies, along with brand new ones, and never-before-seen footage. Steve-O later said that the reason this wasn't a whole fully new movie was because of Knoxville's brain hemorrhage injury from Jackass Forever. Bam Margera, who was fired from the production of Jackass Forever, only appears in the new movie through archived footage. Margera was offered but declined to participate in filming new footage, but gave permission for them to use his old and unused footage.

Knoxville confirmed that this is the last Jackass film. "This is the natural place to end", he said. He also said that this movie will not have a .5 sequel, making this the second Jackass film without a .5 version, after Jackass: The Movie (2002).

=== Filming ===
Principal photography started in late February 2026, with the entire main cast of Jackass Forever returning, except Eric Manaka, and took place in Santa Clarita, California. The opening sequence, and the new bits were all filmed in just five days, with one extra added day of filming for the ending sequence on April 17, 2026, in Simi Valley, California. Producer Spike Jonze directed the opening and ending sequences.

Explosions expert Tory Belleci was on set for a portion of filming, and some of his ideas were filmed. He also came up with the idea of surfing with dynamite after testing the idea for MythBusters. The stunt was ultimately scrapped as it was determined to be logistically improbable.

They also tried to do a stunt with Dave England's one testicle, by wanting to add a ball that lights up in the empty spot. This was also scrapped because the lawyers did not allow it to be filmed.

During the shooting of the ending sequence filmed in Simi Valley, the final explosion was large enough that residents nearby thought the large mushroom cloud was created by an airplane crashing.

=== Injuries ===
Dave England ruptured a tendon in his right middle finger by unknowingly trying to dig a coin out of Zach Holmes' anus. Wee Man got injured during the opening sequence, and was sore for three weeks afterwards. Dave was knocked unconscious after getting tased during the "Marionettes" bit, this was ultimately cut out of the theatrical release. Poopies was also knocked unconscious after getting tackled by former American football player Tigi Hill; however, this was also cut out of the final theatrical release, but can be fully seen in the deleted scenes montage. Rachel Wolfson was injured while filming a bit which was ultimately cut from the theatrical release, in which she and Poopies attempted to walk across the balance beam in one wetsuit together. Wolfson fell onto her back after every try, bruising some ribs.

=== Unused scenes ===
Newly filmed bits that were not included in the theatrical or home media releases include; Poopies and Rachel Wolfson attempting to walk across the balance beam in one single wetsuit together; Loomis Fall stepping on a kick drum pedal that hits Zach Holmes in the nuts; Dave England getting messed with during the "Marionettes" bit; Ehren McGhehey, and Dark Shark putting their hands through the hole in the "Escape Room From Hell"; Rachel's part of the "Follow the Leader" bit, where Knoxville controls her arm; director and producer Jeff Tremaine being questioned on the electric chair as part of the "Truth or Dare" bit; and sumo wrestler Ramy Elgazar's part of the "Truth or Dare" bit.

== Marketing ==
On April 10, 2026, Johnny Knoxville announced a charity sweepstakes, where the movie's official title was announced as Jackass: Best and Last. He presented the first official trailer at CinemaCon on April 16, 2026. The first trailer was released online on April 27, 2026.

On June 6, 2026, Wee Man, Steve-O, Poopies, and Jasper Dolphin appeared on an IGN livestream to promote the movie. On the same date, a block party was held with most of the main cast and film crew on the Paramount Pictures studio in Los Angeles, California.

On June 13, 2026, a Jackass movie marathon was held in the Fox Westwood Village Theater, where every theatrical mainline Jackass movie was shown. It was hosted by Knoxville, Wee Man, Preston Lacy, Dave England, and director and producer Jeff Tremaine.

On June 15, 2026, eleven days before its theatrical release, a special screening of Jackass: Best and Last was held at BFI IMAX in London, England. It was hosted by Knoxville, Chris Pontius, and Tremaine.

== Release ==
The film was first theatrically released in most European countries on June 25, 2026, in the United States on June 26, 2026, and in Australia and New Zealand on July 2, 2026.

=== Home media ===
In July 2026, Paramount Home Entertainment announced that the film would be released on Digital HD on August 11, 2026, while the Blu-ray of Jackass: Best and Last was released on October 6, 2026. The digital HD and Blu-ray include a 17 minute deleted scenes montage. The movie was released on Paramount+ on September 24, 2026.

== Reception ==
On review aggregation website Rotten Tomatoes, 87% of 105 critics' reviews are positive, with an average rating of 6.4/10. The website’s consensus reads: "Achieving a surprising amount of poignancy for a franchise centered around buddies terrorizing each other, Jackass' purported swan song goes out on a brown note that hurts so good." Metacritic, which uses a weighted average, assigned the film a score of 63 out of 100, based on 30 critics, indicating "generally favorable" reviews. Audiences polled by CinemaScore gave the film an average grade of "A-" on an A+ to F scale.

Guy Lodge of Variety wrote, "You leave Jackass: Best and Last believing that they'll actually miss all this and that's enough to make us miss it too". In his review for the Associated Press, Mark Kennedy summarized the film as "a sad but fitting end to an extreme stunt franchise that was vanquished not by imagination but time".
