= Tokyo Shock Boys =

Japanese stunt performance group

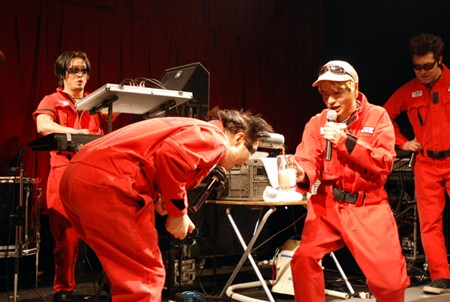

Comedy career
- Members: Torata Nanbu; Sangojugo; Gyuzo; Danna Koyanagi

The Tokyo Shock Boys (東京ショックボーイズ, Tōkyō Shokku Bōizu), or Dengeki Network (電撃ネットワーク, Dengeki Nettowāku), is a Japanese group of four men who perform dangerous and crude stunts.

== History ==
The group was formed in Tokyo in 1990. The Tokyo Shock Boys have a huge cult following in Japan and have appeared in many other countries, such as Australia, New Zealand, Canada, Germany and Scotland.

In 2006, they made appearances in Japanorama, Adam & Joe go Tokyo and the Dirty Sanchez movie. However, their shows are viewed as having more 'magic' stunts rather than painful ones. This was proven in Dirty Sanchez: The Movie as the Tokyo Shock Boys refused to do a show with Dirty Sanchez because they viewed their stunts to be too extreme.

== Members ==
The members of the group are:

- Torata Nanbu; until he died of cerebral apoplexy on January 20, 2024.
- Sangojugo (三五十五, Sangojugo)
- Gyuzo
- Danna Koyanagi

== See also ==
- Dirty Sanchez
- The Dudesons
- Jackass
- CKY
- Too Stupid to Die
- Les 11 commandements
- Jim Rose Circus
