= Jeff Tremaine =

American director and producer (born 1966)

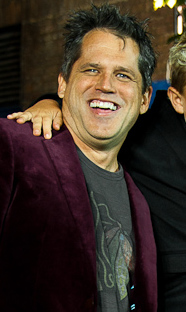
- Tremaine in 2014
- Born: September 4, 1966 (age 60); Durham, North Carolina, U.S.
- Occupations: Director; producer; screenwriter
- Years active: 1996–present
- Known for: Co-creator of Jackass
- Spouse: Laura Tremaine
- Children: 2

Jeff Tremaine (born September 4, 1966) is an American film and television director, producer, and screenwriter. He is best known for co-creating the MTV reality stunt show Jackass with Spike Jonze and Johnny Knoxville and for directing its subsequent movie franchise (2002-2026).

== Career ==
Tremaine was born on September 4, 1966, in Durham, North Carolina. He was born to a military family that moved frequently before finally settling in Rockville, Maryland. He is the former editor of the skating culture magazine Big Brother and a former art director of the influential BMX magazine GO, as well as a former professional BMX rider. He was the executive producer on the MTV reality series Rob and Big and the executive producer of Rob Dyrdek's Fantasy Factory, Ridiculousness, Nitro Circus, and Adult Swim's Loiter Squad. He also briefly sang in the band Milk, whose song "The Knife Song" was popularized in the skate video Video Days.

Tremaine directed and produced all the movies in the Jackass franchise. The third sequel to Jackass, titled Jackass 3D, was filmed in 3D starting in January 2010. The whole cast of the previous films returned. He also directed, produced, and wrote Jackass Presents: Bad Grandpa (2013), the first Jackass movie with a storyline.

In 2014, Tremaine launched his production company, Gorilla Flicks.

After announcing that Tremaine would be directing the Mötley Crüe biopic The Dirt, Tremaine made a public appearance at the band's final tour press conference confirming and also speaking on the film expressing his excitement, stating "The Dirt is a movie I've wanted to make ever since I read the book in 2002." One year later, Focus Features announced that they had picked up the film, keeping Tremaine on to continue with directing.

In 2015, Tremaine directed the WWE Network series WWE Swerved. In 2010, Tremaine directed the 30 for 30 film The Birth of Big Air and, in 2015, directed Angry Sky. In September 2016, Tremaine directed a new safety video for American Airlines.

Tremaine also directed and produced the fourth main Jackass movie titled Jackass Forever, which released theatrically on February 4, 2022.

He hosts the official Jackass podcast, titled Jackass: The Podcast, along with Johnny Knoxville. The first episode released on June 18, 2026.

Tremaine once again returned to direct and produce Jackass: Best and Last, which was theatrically released on June 26, 2026.

== Personal life ==
Tremaine went to high school and was friends with filmmaker Spike Jonze. Tremaine lives in Los Angeles with his wife, podcaster and author Laura Tremaine, and their two children.

== Filmography ==
=== Film ===
Direct-to-video

Year	Title	Director	Producer	Creator	Cinematographer	Himself
1996	Shit	No	No	No	Yes	Yes
1998	Number Two	No	No	Yes	No	No
1999	Jackass: The Lost Tapes	Yes	No	No	No	Yes
1999	boob	Yes	No	Yes	No	No
2001	Crap	No	Yes	No	No	No
2001	CKY 3	No	No	No	No	Yes
2002	Don't Try This at Home: The Steve-O Video: Vol. 2 - The Tour	No	No	No	Yes	No
2002	CKY4: The Latest & Greatest	No	No	No	No	Yes
2004	Steve-O: The Early Years	No	No	No	Yes	Yes
2006	Ultimate Predator	No	Executive	No	No	Yes
2008	Jackass Presents: Mat Hoffman's Tribute to Evel Knievel	No	Executive	No	No	Yes
2023	Steve-O's Bucket List	No	No	No	No	Yes

Feature film

Year	Title	Director	Writer	Producer	Himself
2002	Jackass: The Movie	Yes	Yes	Yes	Yes
2006	Jackass Number Two	Yes	Yes	Yes	Yes
2007	Jackass 2.5	Yes	Yes	Yes	Yes
2010	Jackass 3D	Yes	Yes	Yes	Yes
2011	Jackass 3.5	Yes	Yes	Yes	Yes
2012	Nitro Circus: The Movie	No	No	No	Yes
2013	Jackass Presents: Bad Grandpa	Yes	Yes	Yes	Yes
2014	Jackass Presents: Bad Grandpa .5	Yes	Yes	Yes	Yes
2019	The Dirt	Yes	No	No	No
2021	Bad Trip	No	No	Yes	Yes
2022	Jackass Forever	Yes	Yes	Yes	Yes
2022	Jackass 4.5	Yes	Yes	Yes	Yes
2022	Bad Axe	No	No	Executive	No
2026	Jackass: Best and Last	Yes	Yes	Yes	Yes

Documentary film

Year	Title	Producer	Himself
2007	The Man Who Souled the World	No	Yes
2009	The Wild and Wonderful Whites of West Virginia	Executive	No
2015	Being Evel	Yes	No
2017	Dumb: The Story of Big Brother Magazine	Executive	Yes

=== Television ===
Year	Title	Director	Executive Producer	Creator	Himself	Notes
2000–2001	Jackass	Yes	Yes	Yes	Yes	
2002	Jackass Backyard BBQ	No	Yes	No	Yes	
2003–2006	Wildboyz	Yes	Yes	Yes	Yes	
2006–2008	Rob & Big	No	Yes	Yes	No	
2007	24 Hours with...	No	No	No	Yes	Episode Steve-O
2007	Bam's Unholy Union	No	No	No	Yes	1 episode
2007–2009	Nitro Circus	Yes	Yes	Yes	Yes	
2009	Dancing with the Stars	No	No	No	Yes	1 episode
2009–2015	Rob Dyrdek's Fantasy Factory	No	Yes	Yes	No	
2010	The Dudesons in America	No	Yes	Yes	No	
2010	Up Close with Carrie Keagan	No	No	No	Yes	1 episode
2010	Sidewalks Entertainment	No	No	No	Yes	1 episode
2010	TV total	No	No	No	Yes	1 episode
2010	Last Call with Carson Daly	No	No	No	Yes	1 episode
2010–2015	ESPN's 30 for 30	Yes	No	No	No	2 episodes
2011–present	Ridiculousness	No	Yes	Yes	Yes	
2012–2014	Loiter Squad	Yes	Yes	No	Yes	8 episodes
2013–2016	Tanked	No	No	No	Yes	3 episodes
2014	Good Day L.A.	No	No	No	Yes	1 episode
2015–2016	Swerved	Yes	Yes	Yes	Yes	
2019	Jasper & Errol's First Time	No	Yes	No	No	
2020	The Explosion Show	No	Yes	No	Yes	
2021	WWE SmackDown	No	No	No	Yes	1 episode
2022	UFC 270	No	No	No	Yes	Audience member
2022	WrestleMania 38	No	No	No	Yes	Johnny Knoxville's accomplice
2022	Celebrity Family Feud	No	No	No	Yes	Participant; Episode 9.11
2023	The Eric Andre Show	Yes	No	No	No	Segment director for season 6

TV Documentary

Year	Title	Director	Executive Producer	Himself
2009	Steve-O: Demise and Rise	No	Yes	Yes
2011	A Tribute to Ryan Dunn	No	Yes	Yes
2017	Epicly Later'd: Bam Margera	No	No	Yes
2022	Epicly Later'd: Spike Jonze	No	No	Yes
2024	Nöthin' but a Good Time: The Uncensored Story of '80s Hair Metal	Yes	Yes	No
2026	Let It Kill You: Jeff Tremaine	No	No	Yes

TV special

Year	Title	Director	Executive Producer	Creator	Himself
2003	2003 MTV Movie Awards	No	No	No	Yes
2005	Jackass: Gumball 3000 Rally Special	Yes	Yes	Yes	Yes
2008	Jackassworld.com: 24 Hour Takeover	No	Yes	No	Yes
2010	2010 MTV Europe Music Awards	No	No	No	Yes
2014	CKY: The Greatest Hits	No	No	No	Yes
2021	Jackass Shark Week	No	Yes	No	No
2022	Jackass Shark Week 2.0	No	Yes	No	Yes

=== Video game ===
Year	Title	Notes
2007	Jackass: The Game	Voice; Motion capture

=== Music video ===
Year	Artist	Title	Director	Himself	Notes
1993	X	"Country at War"	No	No	Plays a jogger
2002	Andrew W.K.	"We Want Fun"	Yes	Yes	Also producer and cameraman
2003	Turbonegro	"Sell Your Body (To The Night)"	Yes	No	
2010	Weezer	"Memories"	Yes	Yes	
