= Too Stupid to Die =

- Genre: Reality; Stunt show; Cringe comedy; Physical comedy; Slapstick
- Created by: Jude Harris; Zach Holmes
- Starring: Zach Holmes; Coty Saints; Meggan Wentz; Tommy Anderson; Chadwick Allendorf; Damon Reynolds; Khyler Vick; Chad Tepper
- Music by: The Big News
- Opening theme: "Bad Kids" by Black Lips
- Country of origin: United States
- Original language: English
- No. of seasons: 1
- No. of episodes: 8

Production
- Executive producers: Nadim Amiry; Floris Bauer; Ross Breitenbach; Nina L. Diaz; Jude Harris; Zach Holmes; Van Toffler; Tiffany Lea Williams
- Producer: Ryan Byrne
- Production locations: Indiana, U.S.
- Cinematography: Paul Cannon; Joseph Chiodo; Chris Raab
- Editors: Michael Darrow; Paul Makkos; Ramin Mostazavi; Desireh Sedeghat; Blake West
- Production company: Gunpowder & Sky

Original release
- Network: MTV
- Release: August 21 – December 7, 2018

Too Stupid to Die is an American reality television stunt series similar to Jackass. It premiered on MTV on August 21, 2018, and concluded its run on December 7 of the same year.

== Reception ==
Common Sense Media was very critical of the series and indicated it featured "silly and dangerous stunts", while Deadline described them as "bizarre pranks and outrageous stunts".

== Cast ==
- Zach Holmes
- Coty Saints
- Meggan Wentz
- Tommy Anderson
- Chadwick Allendorf
- Damon Reynolds
- Khyler Vick
- Chad Tepper

== Episodes ==
No.	Title	Original release date	U.S. viewers (millions)
1	"Too Stupid to Quit Being Stupid"	August 21, 2018	0.42
2	"Too Stupid to Drive"	November 2, 2018	0.40
3	"Too Stupid to Love"	November 9, 2018	0.26
4	"Too Stupid to Sweat"	November 16, 2018	0.37
5	"Too Stupid to Work"	November 30, 2018	0.40
6	"Too Stupid to Fail"	November 30, 2018	0.30
7	"Too Stupid for the World"	December 7, 2018	0.28
8	"Too Stupid for Holidays"	December 7, 2018	0.23

== See also ==
- CKY
- The Dudesons
- Dirty Sanchez
- Tokyo Shock Boys
- Nitro Circus
