= 24 Hours with... =

- Genre: Reality television
- Presented by: Jamie Campbell
- Country of origin: United Kingdom
- Original language: English
- No. of series: 1
- No. of episodes: 4 (aired)

Production
- Executive producers: Spencer Austin; Harry Harrold; Paul Ross
- Running time: 30 minutes
- Production companies: Hideous Productions; Twofour

Original release
- Network: ITV
- Release: 11 June 2007 – 2007

Related
- Alison Hammond's Big Weekend

24 Hours with... is a reality TV show created by UK production company Hideous Productions for ITV that was broadcast in 2007.

== Format ==
24 Hours with... is a chat show format, as a celebrity and an interviewer spend an intense 24 hours locked in a room together. Each 30-minute show tells the story of their 24 hours in the hot seat, with a digital clock at the bottom of the screen marking the passing of the day.

The shows executive producers are Spencer Austin and Harry Harrold, along with Paul Ross for co-production partners Twofour.

Bobby Brown, Laurence Llewelyn-Bowen, Lee Ryan, David Gest, Stan Collymore, and Steve-O leave their mobile phones and PR advisers at the door for the first series in the UK. The host, Jamie Campbell, can ask them whatever he likes.

== Broadcast ==
In a bid to make room for poorly rating Tuesday night show Tycoon in its new Monday 10pm slot (from Monday 9 July), 24 Hours with... was removed from its slot before all of its episodes had aired.

In April 2024, rival broadcaster BBC announced that they had commissioned a six-episode half-hour series with a similar premise, Alison Hammond's Big Weekend, in which the host spent 48 hours with a celebrity, and that they intended to broadcast it in 2025.
