= Action Point =

2018 American comedy film by Tim Kirkby

- Theatrical release poster
- Directed by: Tim Kirkby
- Screenplay by: John Altschuler; Dave Krinsky
- Story by: Johnny Knoxville; Derek Freda; John Altschuler; Dave Krinsky; Mike Judge
- Based on: The Most Insane Amusement Park Ever; by Matt Robertson
- Produced by: Johnny Knoxville; Bill Gerber; Derek Freda
- Starring: Johnny Knoxville; Chris Pontius
- Cinematography: Michael Snyman
- Edited by: Matthew Kosinski; Nicholas Monsour
- Music by: Deke Dickerson; Andrew Feltenstein; John Nau
- Production companies: Gerber Pictures; Hello Junior
- Distributed by: Paramount Pictures
- Release date: June 1, 2018 (United States)
- Running time: 85 minutes
- Country: United States
- Language: English
- Budget: $19 million
- Box office: $5.1 million

Action Point is a 2018 American slapstick comedy film directed by Tim Kirkby and starring Johnny Knoxville and Chris Pontius, both of whom had worked together on Jackass. Knoxville was inspired to make the film after seeing Matt Robertson's 2013 short documentary The Most Insane Amusement Park Ever, about Action Park, a theme park in New Jersey which was notorious for its poorly designed, unsafe rides, in addition to employing underaged, undertrained and often intoxicated staff.

Set in the early 1980s, the film follows D.C. Carver, a daredevil who owns a low-rent, out-of-control amusement park Action Point with dangerous rides. D.C. and his crew must save the park from the loan officer Knoblach who plans on selling his land for foreclosure.

As with Bad Grandpa, a previous film by Knoxville, Action Point features traditional Jackass-style stunts connected by a fictional narrative. It was released in the United States on June 1, 2018, by Paramount Pictures. It underperformed at the box office, grossing $5.1 million against its $19 million budget and received mostly negative reviews from critics, who called the film "boring, by-the-numbers and deflated."

== Plot ==
In the early 1980s, D.C. Carver is the owner of Action Point, a low-rent amusement park with numerous safety hazards; regardless, due to being the only amusement park in the area, it is popular with the youth. However, a new amusement park, 7 Parks, opens and begins to draw customers away from Action Point. D.C. is also pressured by his loan officer Knoblach into selling his land due to his failure to pay off a $100,000 loan. Meanwhile, his estranged teenage daughter Boogie comes to visit and helps around the park as a summer job.

One night, D.C. and his staff break into 7 Parks to observe and sabotage the park, but are nearly caught. D.C. realizes that he needs to come up with something big to compete, eventually deciding that they need to start promoting Action Point as a park about what patrons can do, whereas 7 Parks is about what they can't do. He then decides to remove all the safety measures from the rides in an attempt to make the park stand out, causing several people – including himself – to be seriously injured. Boogie also confesses to park lifeguard Benny that the true purpose of her visit is to get D.C. to sign papers that would allow her mother's boyfriend to become her legal guardian.

As a publicity stunt, D.C. and the staff interrupt a local TV broadcast promoting the park which draws in customers, but sends the park into chaos due to the lack of proper rules and regulations. At Boogie's advice, D.C opens up a section for kids, but it is poorly designed, causing her to inform legal authorities who then shut the park down.

D.C. and the staff repair the park and reopen it, but are told that the bank has foreclosed on the park. Furthermore, Boogie becomes upset after D.C. breaks his promise to take her to a concert, and gets drunk with the staff before they are all arrested. After D.C. bails her out, she snaps at him and reveals her intention for him to sign the papers. The next day, he finds her gone and learns that she may have left for Las Vegas on a bus. Desperate, he and Benny chase down the bus with their car but lose it after it collides with them.

D.C. then realizes that she was not on the bus and tracks her to a restaurant where he explains that the park has become his new family after losing his first one, and the reason he obsesses over it was because he did not want to lose it as well. Unable to pay off his loan, D.C. decides to blow up the park and sell off the land to Knoblach. D.C. opens the park gates one last time and gives away free beer as he is no longer liable for any damages that will occur, and the drunk patrons cause massive damage to the park. Later that night, the staff gather one last time and shoot fireworks to commemorate their time in the park.

The next day, as Boogie prepares to leave, D.C. proposes that the two of them instead take a road trip and make a stop in Austin to attend the concert. Boogie is overjoyed and the former park staff offer to come along.

In the present day in the late 2010s, a much older D.C. finishes his story to his granddaughter as Boogie arrives home and before he leaves, he pretends to have a heart attack in the yard, which Boogie calls out as the two of them share a laugh.

== Cast ==
- Johnny Knoxville as Deshawn Chico "D.C." Carver
- Clover Nee as Rudie, D.C.'s granddaughter and Boogie's daughter
- Chris Pontius as Benny, the laidback lifeguard at Action Point
- Eleanor Worthington Cox as Boogie Carver
  - Susan Yeagley as adult Boogie Carver
- Dan Bakkedahl as Gregory Knoblach
- Camilla Wolfson as Mia
- Johnny Pemberton as Ziffel
- Jack Haven (Note: Credited as Brigette Lundy-Paine) as Four Finger Annie
- Eric Manaka as Rodney
- Joshua Hoover as Pete
- Conner McVicker as Stiv
- Matt Schulze as Killer
- Michael Everson as Slappy
- Matthew Peterson as Travis Knoblach
- Leon Clingman as Joel Green

== Production ==
Filming took place in Cape Town, South Africa on a $19 million budget.

Knoxville, in an interview with Vanity Fair, said that during filming, he was injured more times than his past films throughout his entire career: "four concussions, broke my hand, busted my meniscus, whiplash, stitches over my right eye which required stitches, lost a couple teeth." While filming the Alpine Slide sequence, he landed on his face, feet, and shoulder. After filming, he was sent to the emergency room, checked out, and went home. When he blew his nose to get rid of the blood, his left eye popped out of his socket. Freaked out, he immediately called his executive producer and advised him that he needed to return to the hospital. The doctors told him that he could not sneeze or blow his nose for six weeks. In the last days of filming, they filmed only the right side of his face, because he looked like "a Picasso painting."

== Release ==
Originally titled Action Park, the film was released in the United States on June 1, 2018, having previously been slated for March 23 and May 11, 2018, releases.

=== Box office ===
In the United States and Canada, Action Point was released alongside Adrift and Upgrade, and was originally projected to gross around $10 million from 2,032 theaters in its opening weekend. However, after making $790,000 on its first day, estimates were lowered to $2–3 million. It ended up debuting to $2.3 million and finishing ninth, the worst opening of Knoxville's career and 23rd lowest-ever for a wide release. Deadline Hollywood attribute the low figure to the lack of Jackass stars in the film sans Knoxville and Chris Pontius, poor critical reviews and the difficulty of promoting an original R-rated comedy.

=== Critical response ===
On Rotten Tomatoes, the film has an approval rating of 16% based on 50 reviews, and an average rating of 3.7/10. The site's critical consensus simply reads, "Ouch." On Metacritic, the film has a weighted average score of 36 out of 100, based on 19 critics, indicating "generally unfavorable" reviews. Audiences polled by CinemaScore gave the film an average grade of "C+" on an A+ to F scale.
