= Don't Try This at Home: The Steve-O Video =

2001 film by Steve-O

- Directed by: Steve-O
- Written by: Steve-O
- Produced by: Dimitry Elyashkevich; Steve-O
- Starring: Steve-O
- Cinematography: Dimitry Elyashkevich
- Edited by: Nick Dunlap; Dimitry Elyashkevich
- Distributed by: J&N Media
- Release date: 2001
- Running time: 33 minutes
- Country: United States
- Language: English

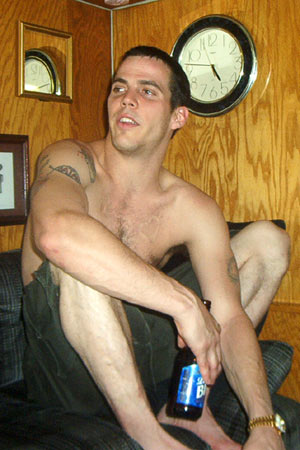
Steve-O in 2003

Don't Try This at Home: The Steve-O Video is the first DVD by television personality and stuntman Steve-O, released in 2001. It mostly contains footage that couldn't be shown on related MTV show Jackass, due to censorship.

Aside from Steve-O, the DVD features Chris Pontius, Jason "Wee Man" Acuña, Preston Lacy, Ryan Dunn, Jeff Tremaine, Dimitry Elyashkevich, Johnny Knoxville, Bam Margera, and Ryan Simonetti. It contains a cast commentary and a bonus making-of video.

== Content ==
Some noteworthy scenes are Steve-O drinking bong water, the fireball face off where Steve-O spits a fireball while doing a backflip, burning his face in the process, ice skating and falling through thin ice on the Cuyahoga River and the vodka IV where Steve-O gets five shots of vodka pumped through his blood stream courtesy of a registered nurse. It also contains the video "The Career Ender", appropriately titled because it was once believed to end Steve-O's career. Highlights of the Career Ender show Steve-O's first attempt at the butterfly, in which he stapleguns his scrotum to his leg.

== Unauthorized re-release ==
After a falling-out with Steve O's old manager, Nick Dunlap, Dunlap re-released the DVD, advertising it as a "Now 100% special edition". It is the same disc sold in 2001, but with a red cover. This was completely unauthorized by Steve-O. Steve-O later sued Dunlap and his attorney Jason Berk.

== Sequels ==
Don't Try This at Home sold 140,000 copies, and was followed by Don't Try This at Home Volume 2: The Tour (2002) and Steve-O: Out on Bail (2003), which show Steve-O on a tour with other Jackass cast members (such as Bam Margera and Ryan Dunn) and their exploits and stunts during that time. A fourth video, Steve-O: The Early Years (2004), records Steve-O engaging in stunts and pranks done primarily for his and his friends' amusement, as opposed to performing for an audience.

=== Releases ===
- Don't Try This at Home – The Steve-O Video Vol. 2: The Tour (2002)
- Steve-O: Out on Bail (2003) (a.k.a. Don't Try This at Home – The Steve-O Video Vol. 3: Out on Bail)
- Steve-O: The Early Years (2004)
