= Memories (Weezer song) =

Single by Weezer (featuring the cast of Jackass)

from the album Hurley and Jackass 3D Soundtrack
- Released: August 10, 2010
- Recorded: 2010
- Genre: Alternative rock; grunge
- Length: 3:16
- Label: Epitaph
- Songwriter: Rivers Cuomo
- Producers: Shawn Everett; Rivers Cuomo

Weezer singles chronology
"I'm Your Daddy" (2010)	"Memories" (2010)	"Hang On" (2011)

Music video
- "Memories" on YouTube

"Memories" is a song by the band Weezer. It is the opening track and first single from their 2010 album Hurley and was first released online on August 10, 2010, to promote the comedy film Jackass 3D. Following the death of Jackass member Ryan Dunn, the video became the most searched for video on YouTube.

== Composition ==
Sean Reid of Alter The Press! said the song "sees the band continuing their hook-filled alt rock, that they have produced in recent years." Michael Hann of The Guardian said that the song "harks back to the days when Weezer seemed like a fresh, slightly puzzled take on grunge".

== Music video ==
The music video for "Memories" debuted on September 9, 2010, on the TV show Jersey Shore. The video was shot on Super 8 cameras and filmed on the locations of the skate video "The Search for Animal Chin". The clip features Weezer playing next to and inside an empty pool while various skateboarders do tricks around them. The video track also features the cast of Jackass on backing vocals, and clips from the movie Jackass 3D.

== Personnel ==
Personnel taken from Hurley CD booklet.

Weezer

- Brian Bell
- Rivers Cuomo
- Scott Shriner
- Patrick Wilson

Additional musicians

- Gang Vocals: Johnny Knoxville, Wee Man, Ryan Dunn, Dave England, Preston Lacy, April Margera, Ehren McGhehey, Steve-O, Chris Pontius
- Additional Guitar: Chris Pontius

== Chart positions ==
Chart (2010)	Peak position
Canada Rock (Billboard)	23
Czech Republic Modern Rock (IFPI)	4
Japan (Japan Hot 100) (Billboard)	20
US Alternative Songs (Billboard)	21
US Rock Songs (Billboard)	29
