= Steve-O =

American stunt performer (born 1974)

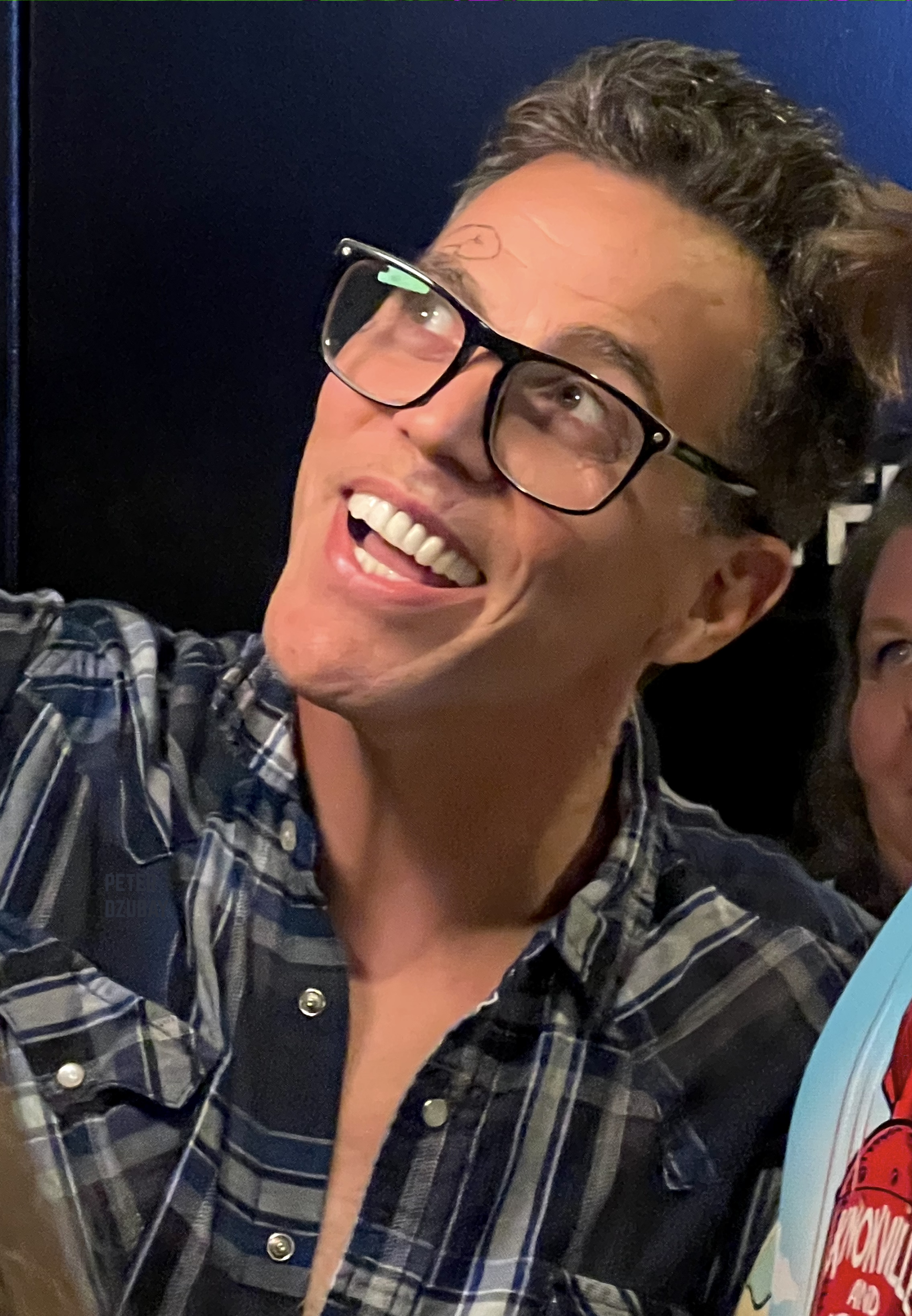
- Steve-O in 2024
- Born: Stephen Gilchrist Glover; June 13, 1974 (age 52); Wimbledon, London, England
- Citizenship: United States; United Kingdom; Canada
- Occupations: Stunt performer; comedian; television personality; podcaster
- Years active: 1998–present
- Notable work: Jackass, Wildboyz, Dr. Steve-O
- Partner(s): Lux Wright (2018–2025); Koral Bickel (2025–2026)
- Steve-O's voice At Neal Brennan's podcast Blocks; Recorded September 2023
- Website: steveo.com

Stephen Gilchrist Glover (born June 13, 1974), known professionally as Steve-O, is an American stunt performer, comedian, Youtuber, television personality, and podcaster. He rose to fame in the early 2000s as a cast member of the MTV reality slapstick comedy series Jackass and subsequent films, which showcased dangerous stunts and pranks and led to a successful film franchise (2002–2026).

Following the success of Jackass, Steve-O appeared in numerous spin-offs, including Wildboyz and Dr. Steve-O, and embarked on comedy tours that mixed stand-up with stunt performances. He released a memoir, Professional Idiot (2011), and later built a following through his YouTube channel and podcast Steve-O's Wild Ride! which he began in 2020. As of 2026, Steve-O has 7.02 million subscribers on his YouTube channel.

Steve-O has been open about his struggles with substance abuse, which led to several legal and health issues in the mid-2000s. After an intervention by his Jackass co-stars in March 2008, he entered treatment and is now an advocate for recovery and animal rights.

Born in Wimbledon, London, to a Canadian mother and American father, Steve-O holds Canadian, British, and American citizenships.

== Early life and education ==
Stephen Gilchrist Glover was born on June 13, 1974 in London to Donna Gay Glover (née Wauthier; 1947–2003), a Canadian; and Richard Edward "Ted" Glover (born 1943), an American business executive. He is of English ancestry on his father's side. He has one older sister, Cindy.

When he was six months old, the family moved to Brazil, where his father worked as president of Pepsi-Cola's South American division. Glover later recalled that his first words were spoken in Portuguese, and that the family's frequent relocations disrupted his early schooling. They subsequently lived in Venezuela, where he learned Spanish.

By age four, the family had returned to the United States, settling in Darien, Connecticut, and later moving to Miami, Florida. At age nine, the family relocated to London, then to Toronto when he was twelve, and back to London again the following year. He attended the American School in London.

At sixteen, Glover began using drugs such as LSD and cannabis, and later said that he "narrowly graduated" with his high school diploma in 1992. He enrolled at the University of Miami's School of Communication, where he began using the stage name "Steve-O", but left during his sophomore year in November 1993.

After leaving Miami, Glover lived without permanent housing and often stayed with friends. During this period, he filmed his own stunts, including a 1995 jump from a balcony that resulted in multiple injuries, among them broken teeth, a fractured cheekbone, and a concussion.

In 1997, after further struggles with substance use and minor arrests, he was accepted into the Ringling Bros. and Barnum & Bailey Clown College in Sarasota, Florida, graduating in 1997.

== Career ==
=== Jackass (2000–2003) ===
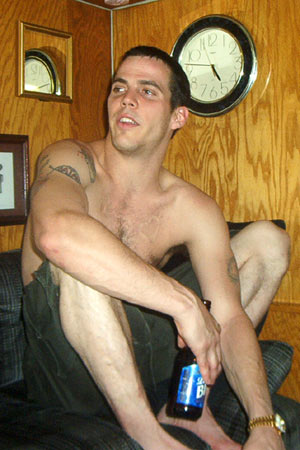
Steve-O in 2003

After completing his training at the Ringling Bros. and Barnum & Bailey Clown College in 1997, Steve-O was not selected to join the circus. He instead worked as a clown at a circus based at the Fort Lauderdale Swap Shop flea market and performed on cruise ships for Royal Caribbean International. During this period, he filmed his own stunts and performances, often distributing VHS tapes of his work to promote himself.

In the late 1990s, recordings reached director Jeff Tremaine, who was developing a stunt-based television project for MTV. Tremaine recruited Steve-O to join the ensemble cast of Jackass, which premiered in 2000. Steve-O was evicted by his sister before then and was still homeless and financially insecure following Season 1. The series, which showcased dangerous stunts and pranks performed by Steve-O and other cast members, quickly became a cultural phenomenon.

Following the show's success, MTV released seven films based on the series: Jackass: The Movie (2002), Jackass Number Two (2006), the direct-to-video Jackass 2.5 (2007), Jackass 3D (2010), the direct-to-video Jackass 3.5 (2011), Jackass Forever (2022), and Jackass 4.5 (2022), and Jackass: Best and Last (2026) The theatrical installments — Jackass: The Movie, Jackass Number Two, Jackass 3D, Jackass Presents: Bad Grandpa (2013), and Jackass Forever — were box-office successes.

In 2001, Steve-O released Don't Try This at Home on DVD, which contained material MTV censored. It went on to sell 140,000 copies. He toured promoting the DVD doing stunts, which was filmed and released as Don't Try This at Home Volume 2: The Tour.

On July 31, 2002, Steve-O was arrested on obscenity and assault charges for stapling his scrotum to his leg, and for being a principal to a second-degree battery, during a performance at a nightclub in Houma, Louisiana on July 11, 2002. After several delays, in March 2003 Steve-O made a deal with Louisiana prosecutors placing him on supervised probation for one year, requiring him to make a charitable donation of $5,000 to a shelter for battered women and children and forbidding him from ever performing in Terrebonne Parish, Louisiana again.

In 2003, Steve-O toured Europe with Bam Margera, a friend and co-star of Jackass. On May 22, 2003, Steve-O was arrested and jailed while in Sweden due to footage of him swallowing a condom containing cannabis to get it past authorities while flying on a plane. He then regurgitated it live on stage, which he showed in his DVD Steve-O: Out on Bail (aka Don't Try This at Home – The Steve-O Video Vol. 3: Out on Bail). Steve-O reached a deal with the Swedish prosecutors and was released on May 27, 2003, after paying a fine of 45,000 kronor (equal to about US$5,800 at the time).

As part of the plea bargain, Steve-O admitted to possessing one ecstasy tablet and five grams of marijuana, although he claimed he had no knowledge of where the ecstasy came from. The Swedish arrest was included in the third installment of the DVD series titled Steve-O: Out on Bail. Two months later on July 19, 2003, Steve-O was arrested on charges of disorderly conduct for urinating on potato chips in public during a Lollapalooza tour concert in Burgettstown, Pennsylvania. Steve-O claimed he was kicked off the tour by Lollapalooza producers because of the incident.

=== After Jackass (2004–2007) ===
After Jackass ended, Steve-O co-starred with Chris Pontius on MTV's Wildboyz, which lasted four seasons from 2003 until 2006. The two performed stunts and acts with animals, often putting themselves in situations for which they were not trained.

In 2005, he became the spokesperson for the Sneaux brand of footwear. Television commercials promoting the shoe company included such acts as Steve-O jumping into garbage, getting his foot bitten by an alligator (simulated) and drinking rotten milk.

On March 27, 2006, he and Jackass co-star Chris Pontius visited The Dean Blundell Show, a morning show on Toronto radio station CFNY (102.1 The Edge), to promote their Don't Try This at Home tour. He urinated on the floor and performed a stunt called "Unwrapping the Mummy" all in front of a live studio audience. Hosts Dean Blundell, Jason Barr, and Todd Shapiro were suspended for the week following the appearance, after many complaints. In April 2006, Steve-O later sued manager Nick Dunlap and attorney Jason Berk, accusing them of lying to him to fund their lavish lifestyles.

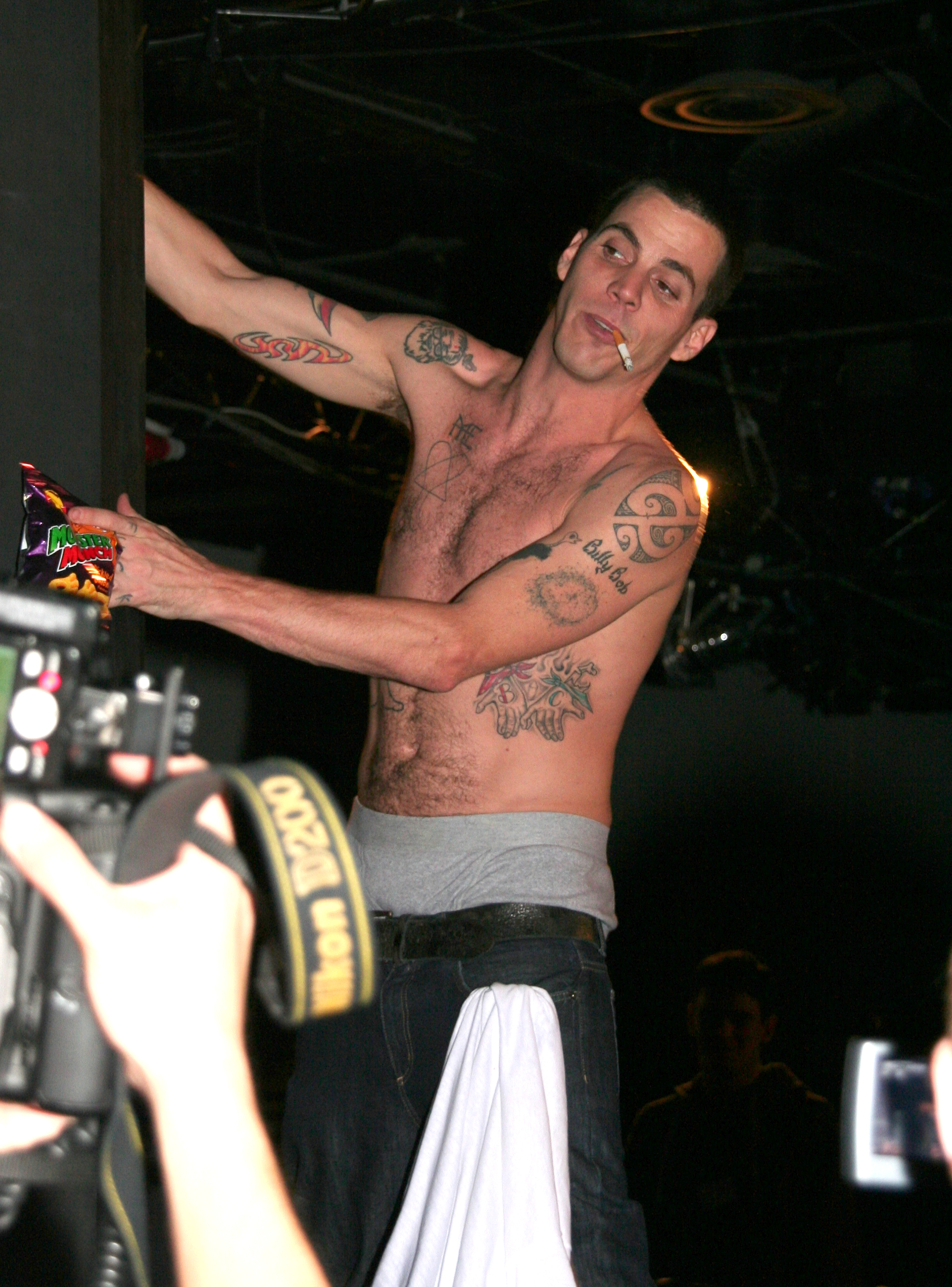
Steve-O at the World Series of Video Games in 2006

On July 18, 2006, Steve-O became a late contestant on the British reality show Love Island broadcast on ITV from Fiji in an effort to boost ratings. Despite stating he had stopped drinking, he asked for beer while on the show. The next day, he abruptly left Love Island because he was not allowed the beer which he had requested.

In November 2006, he went on a drug binge after being misdiagnosed with cardiomyopathy, a serious heart condition. He was later examined by heart specialists who concluded he was in good health.

In 2007, Steve-O starred in his own television show called Dr. Steve-O on the USA Network. In the show, he helped make his guests cool and "de-wussify" them. That same year he appeared in Jackass 2.5, which mainly consisted of material that did not appear in the second Jackass movie. Additionally, he appeared with some Jackass alumni in National Lampoon's TV: The Movie.

Ӏn 2007, Steve-O appeared in episode 5 on Scarred, discussing how he was "accidentally" stabbed in the back by a 3 foot samurai sword by Johnny Knoxville.

On February 25, 2008, he appeared on The Howard Stern Show with Howard Stern, Robin Quivers and Artie Lange on Sirius Satellite Radio to promote his upcoming rap album Hard as a Rock. Another mix-CD released by Steve-O is called The Dumbest Asshole in Hip Hop.

=== Psychiatric problems and rehab (2008) ===
On February 23, 2008, Steve-O joined the rest of the Jackass crew for the Jackass MTV 24 Hour Takeover, which promoted JackassWorld.com. He participated in several stunts, and even debuted his rap music video which was executive produced by recording artist D-Jukes, leading to Mike Judge bringing back the duo of Beavis and Butt-Head for the first time in years to criticize it. During the live broadcast, Steve-O was kicked out of MTV studios on the request of executives for his behavior and intoxication.

Bipolar disorder diagnosis

On March 9, 2008, after receiving an email from Steve-O that suggested his possible suicide, Steve-O's friends, including co-star Johnny Knoxville, became concerned he was a danger to himself and consulted with physician Drew Pinsky, who told them to get Steve-O to a hospital immediately. He was placed on a 72-hour psychiatric hold which was later lengthened to 14 days due to an alleged suicide attempt and he was diagnosed with bipolar disorder.

In a mass e-mail addressed to his friends, Steve-O expressed that he previously had thought of his drug use and bipolarity as a "good thing", but that he now realizes that his drug use was apparently hurting those he loved most. He later stated that his drug use got so bad that he hallucinated an intervention with his friends, humorously stating that he knew he needed help once his hallucinations started urging him to quit drugs.

On June 4, 2008, Steve-O pleaded guilty to felony possession of cocaine. He avoided jail with the successful completion of a treatment program. In July, after 115 days of sobriety, Steve-O announced he was "back in the loony bin". He returned to the mental institution, he said, because "I've had horrible mood swings and severe depression. My brain is fucked up from using so much cocaine, ketamine, PCP, nitrous oxide, and all sorts of other drugs."

=== Post-rehab, Jackass reprised and comedy tours (2009–2012) ===
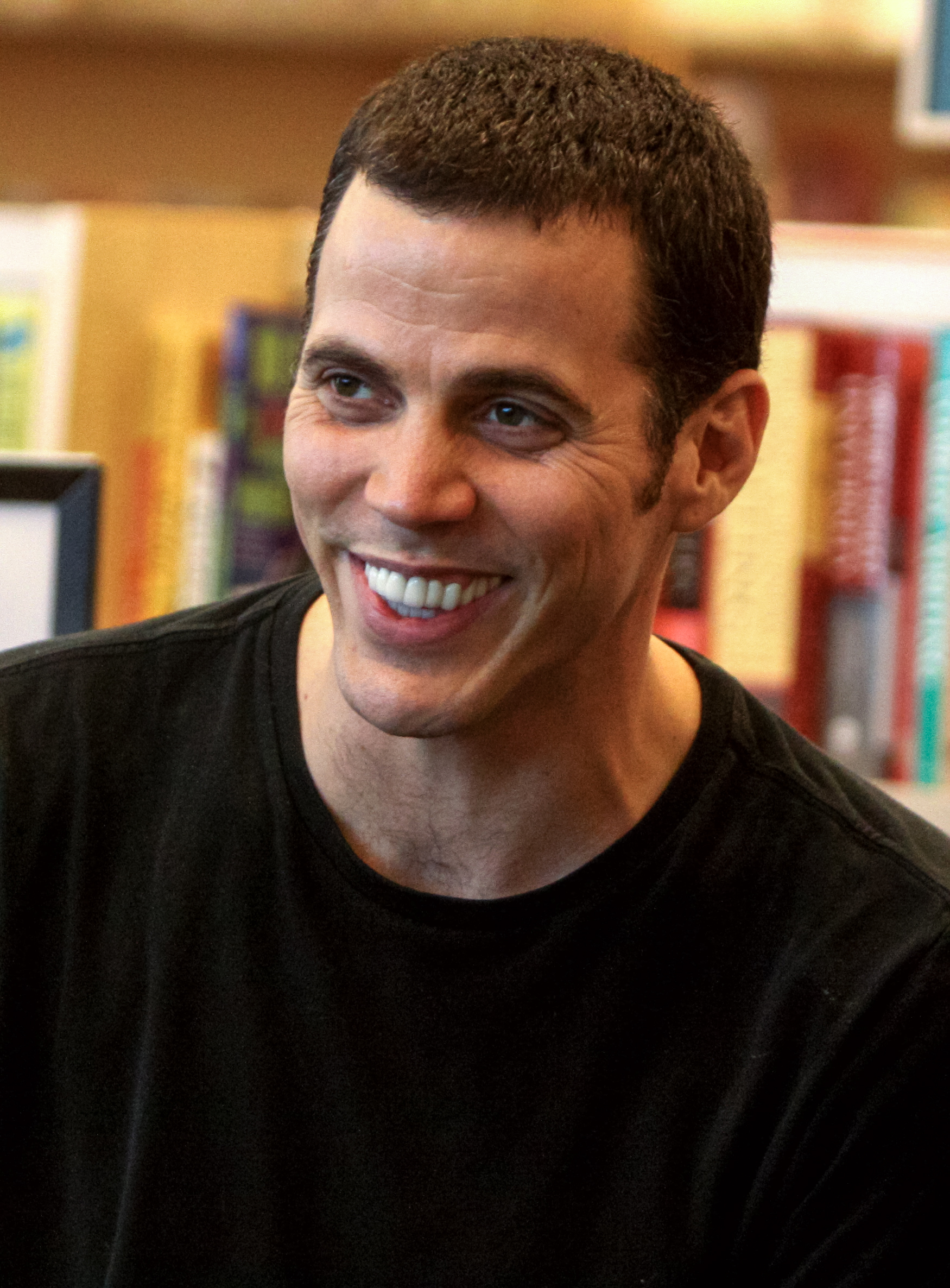
Steve-O in 2011

In March 2009, Steve-O was on the eighth season of Dancing with the Stars, paired with Lacey Schwimmer. After the first week, he complained of pinched nerves and back spasms and did not compete in the second week after injuring his back further by falling on his microphone pack during dress rehearsal. The judges based their scores on his performance at the dress rehearsal. He was eventually eliminated in the sixth week of the competition.

On May 3, 2009, MTV premiered a documentary titled Steve-O: Demise and Rise about how his life was affected by the use of drugs and alcohol. The show featured home-made video footage of Steve-O using drugs and vandalizing his apartment. In an August 2009 interview with Johnny Knoxville for The Times-Picayune, Knoxville on the topic of Steve-O's recovery and rehabilitation said "He's taking to sobriety like he took to drugs and alcohol, I'm very proud of him. I think we'll see him doing some stuff here really soon. As a matter of fact, I know we are." He later stated "Something's coming. We're pretty excited ... I think it'll be a big year next year, but I don't want to talk about it yet."

Steve-O later told Comedy Digital Radio station Barry that he has never seen the MTV documentary. "When I saw the footage of myself doing drugs I felt like I could see them, I could taste them. It made me crave them and as embarrassing as that footage is, that just seemed like another reason to get high. I couldn't watch it; I haven't watched it since then. The producers put it all together and finished it up without any input for me, it's better that way."

Steve-O was part of Jackass 3D, the third installment of the Jackass series, released in October 2010. The movie was in 3D and began production on January 25, 2010. In late May 2010, Knoxville has stated that Steve-O's sobriety is at its best and "There is no beer on set this time around even if some of us wish there was". He also said "And to be honest it's going great. Everyone has had different injuries throughout which is a good sign and Steve-O is probably getting the best footage out of everybody. He is really going for it. He wants to prove to everyone he can do these stunts sober. It's been two years since he had a drink now. Everyone has been real supportive of him.".

When Jackass 3D was released in 2010, the movie broke box office records. In promoting the movie, he appeared on The Howard Stern Show, lighting himself on fire.

In November 2010, Steve-O began touring the United States performing stand-up comedy on what he called "Steve-O's Entirely Too Much Information Tour". In early 2011, he announced a nine-month-long American comedy tour. He appeared in Jackass 3.5, which was released in April 2011.

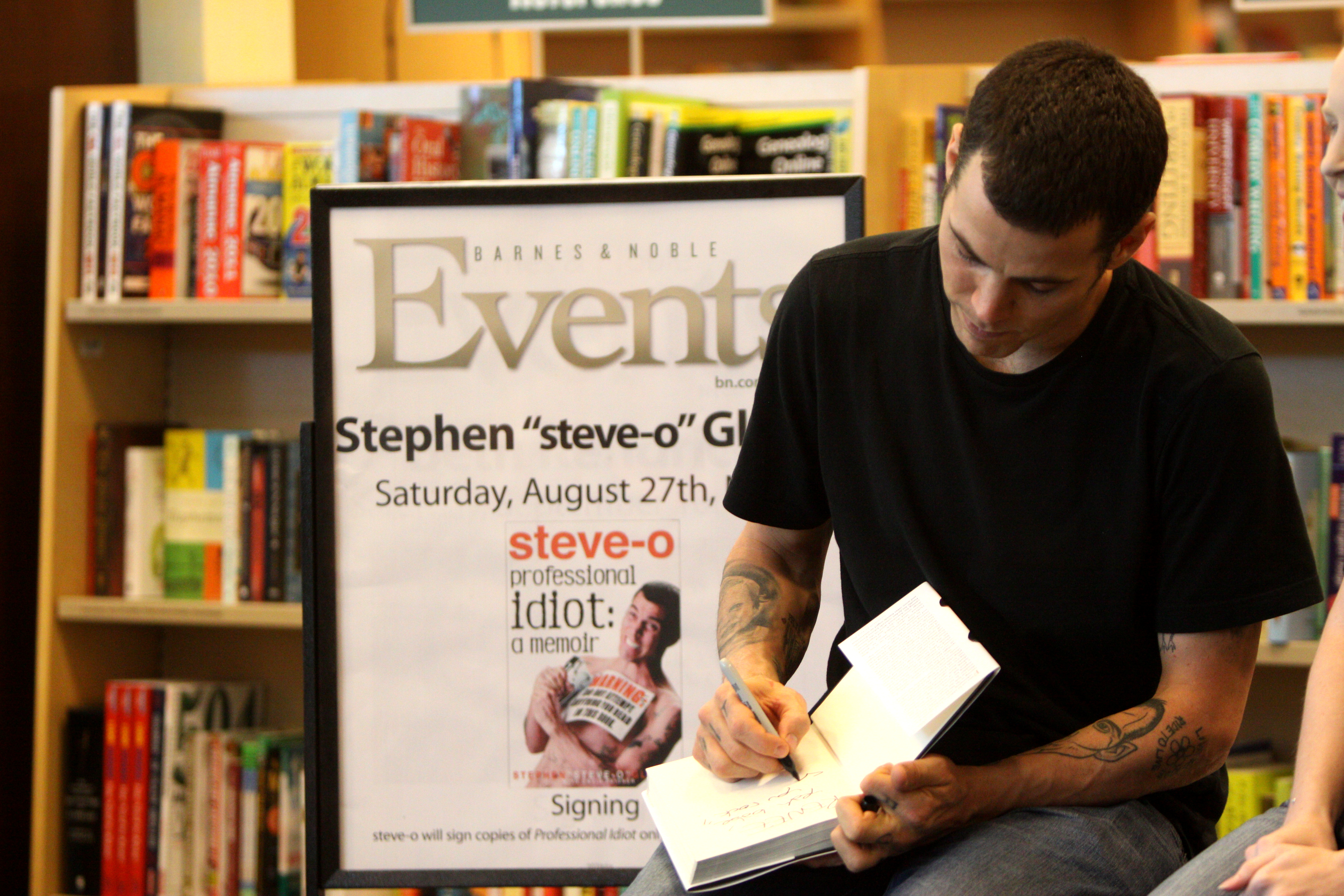
Steve-O at a 2011 book signing

On March 27, 2011, Steve-O was arrested at Calgary International Airport on outstanding charges. He was accused of assault with a weapon after an altercation with an audience member during a 2003 performance. Steve-O was released after paying $10,000 bail.

In May 2011, he took his stand-up show to Australia, playing a show in all the major cities. In an interview with Comedy Digital Radio station Barry, Steve-O explained the genesis of his comedy tour, "Someone invited me to a famous comedy club in Los Angeles and they asked that I get on stage and do something outrageous. When I got to that comedy club I looked around and it occurred to me that the craziest thing I could possibly do by far would be to try stand-up comedy. Like, that was genuinely the most terrifying, outlandish just crazy thing that I could do."

On September 13, 2011, during a taping of the Comedy Central Roast of Charlie Sheen, Steve-O joked, "The last time this many nobodies were at a roast, at least Great White was playing". Steve-O has since apologized for the comment and requested that it be removed from the broadcast of the roast. During the taping of the roast, Steve-O attempted to run into the fist of boxer Mike Tyson, but the first attempt did not work. Later, at the end of the roast, Steve-O made another attempt and this time connected, resulting in Steve-O getting a broken nose. He also claimed to have been sober and clean for three and a half years. Steve-O was also shown to be visibly upset by Amy Schumer's joke about Ryan Dunn's death, but later stated he was not offended by the joke.

It was announced on October 3, 2011, that Steve-O would be hosting truTV's new reality game show Killer Karaoke, the American version of the British competition show Sing If You Can. The show first aired at 9 p.m. EST on November 23, 2012.

He told US Weekly in November 2012 that he credited his two rescue dogs, Walter and Bernie, with helping him to maintain nearly five years of sobriety.

=== YouTube channel and SeaWorld arrest (2013–2018) ===
steveo

YouTube information
- Channels: steveo; Steve-O's Wild Ride! - Podcast
- Years active: 2013–present
- Genres: Entertainment; podcast; comedy
- Subscribers: 8.55 million (combined)
- Views: 979.7 million (combined)

Despite joining in 2005, Steve-O did not regularly upload on his YouTube channel of the same name and other channels until 2013. His main channel SteveO has amassed over 6.05 million subscribers as of February 2022.

In 2014, Steve-O narrated a short video titled "What Came Before, featuring Steve-O: The Truth About Meat and Modern Farms", which was about some of the individual animals rescued by Farm Sanctuary. He also reveals the life of the less fortunate animals that are born into intensive farming in the US.

In December 2014, Steve-O was announced as one of the competitors in the second series of the British TV show The Jump. He was the ninth contestant eliminated.

On August 9, 2015, Steve-O climbed a construction crane in Los Angeles in a protest against SeaWorld. He lit fireworks and inflated a large whale blow-up doll on top of the crane. He broadcast the stunt on his Facebook page, resulting in LAPD and EMS responding with no knowledge of the stunt going on, and later was arrested after climbing down on charges of trespassing. Fans began a GoFundMe campaign for his bail. For the protest, Steve-O was convicted of two misdemeanors and sentenced to 30 days of jail time and 36 months of probation. Steve-O later admitted that the stunt was poorly thought out as he was nowhere near a SeaWorld. He claims he told his attorney to get jail time because it would increase the publicity and make a statement about captivity. He started his jail time on December 9, 2015. He is quoted saying "I mean, if your goal is to make a statement about captivity, you may as well get yourself locked up!" Steve-O was released from jail after serving just eight hours in the Twin Towers Correctional Facility. In 2016, he released his first stand-up comedy special, Guilty as Charged.

On March 9, 2018, Steve-O marked 10 years of sobriety. On the September 2, 2020 episode 261 of the TigerBelly podcast, Steve-O discusses his work in the 12 step program, especially to address a sex addiction.

=== Gnarly and Jackass resurgence (2020–present) ===
On March 19, 2020, Steve-O started his own podcast titled Steve-O's Wild Ride! He hosts this podcast along with Scott Randolph and Paul Brisske. In January 2023, fellow content creator and friend Vinny "Skinny Vinny" Imperati became the fourth co-host.

Gnarly is Steve-O's second stand-up comedy special at the Gothic Theatre in Denver, Colorado. He presented stories, stunts and previously unseen footage to the audience. The special marks the first time the entire cast of Jackass reunited after the death of Ryan Dunn. It was released on July 18, 2020, and is available to watch on Steve-O's website.

In August 2020, he appeared on the VENN Network with host Sasha Grey on her show Grey Area.

Steve-O starred in a supporting role in the film Guest House, released on September 4, 2020.

During the first two days of production for Jackass Forever (2022), both Steve-O and Johnny Knoxville were hospitalized. On December 15, 2020, it was publicly announced that Johnny Knoxville and Steve-O were hospitalized due to on-set injuries. Steve-O also broke his collarbone, but that bit was cut out of the movie. He served as a co-producer on Jackass Forever, and Jackass 4.5 (2022).

On July 11, 2021, during Shark Week, the Discovery Channel aired Jackass Shark Week. It featured Steve-O as well as other Jackass cast members including Knoxville, Chris Pontius, and new cast members Sean "Poopies" McInerney and Jasper Dolphin.

In 2021, Steve-O started going on tour throughout the United States. This tour, titled The Bucket List Tour, features Steve-O telling stories and showing stunts that he wasn't allowed to do for Jackass. He occasionally brought other Jackass members as guests for his live shows. He started going to Australia and New Zealand in February 2023, and to the United Kingdom in June and July 2023. It was released on his website on November 14, 2023.

On April 12, 2022, Steve-O announced the title of his new book as A Hard Kick in the Nuts: What I've Learned from a Lifetime of Terrible Decisions, which was released on September 27, 2022.

On January 7, 2026, Steve-O made an appearance as a contestant on a YouTube video with MrBeast titled "30 Celebrities Fight For $1,000,000," where he competed in a challenge of games to win money for charity (against other celebrities, including Howie Mandel, Josh Peck, and Diplo) and won the competition. In February, he became embroiled in controversy after during a podcast episode with Harland Williams, he appeared to state about immigrants that "the majority of them are murderers". He later publicly apologized for the statement, saying that he "wasn't being serious", and that it was an "absurd, sarcastic comment".

He appeared in Jackass: Best and Last, along with the entire main cast of Jackass Forever. It was theatrically released on June 26, 2026.

== Personal life ==
Steve-O has said he holds citizenship in the United States, Canada, and the United Kingdom. He spoke fluent Spanish and Portuguese by the age of three, but claims to have forgotten most of it since.

He began dating stylist and set designer Lux Wright in 2017, and the pair became engaged in January 2018. In March 2024, Steve-O announced that he and Wright had purchased and relocated to a ranch in Portland, Tennessee, which he named the Radical Ranch. Two months later, he listed his Los Angeles home for $1,799,000. In January 2025, Steve-O stated on his podcast that he and Lux had separated, but remain on good terms, and have started an animal sanctuary together.

Steve-O has been open about addiction and recovery. Following an intervention by his Jackass co-stars, he entered treatment in March 2008 and has stated that he has remained sober since March 10, 2008; he marked 17 years of sobriety in March 2025 In 2023, he discussed struggling with sex addiction and seeking treatment, including outpatient rehab.

He is known for his gravelly speaking voice; after consulting a specialist, he was told that it stems from Stephen using his throat muscles to speak rather than the vocal cords.

Steve-O is pescatarian, and an animal-rights advocate; in October 2015 he received a 30-day jail sentence for a publicity stunt protesting SeaWorld.

In 2018, Steve-O underwent a vasectomy.

=== Family ===
Steve-O spoke about his family life on the September 2, 2020, episode 261 of the podcast TigerBelly with Bobby Lee and Khalyla Kuhn. Steve-O revealed that his mother, who also suffered from alcoholism, suffered an aneurysm on October 10, 1998, which was before he was well known. Steve-O stated that she suffered major cognitive and physical disabilities as a result of the aneurysm and died in November 2003 at the age of 55.

His father, despite being divorced from Steve-O's mother, returned from England when she suffered an aneurysm. On the TigerBelly podcast, Steve-O describes his father taking a moment outside the hospital to express regret for not fully supporting Steve-O's unconventional career path. Up to that point, Steve-O had not yet seen the success that the Jackass series would bring, which contrasted the corporate leadership career his father followed.

=== Animal rights ===
In 2010, it was reported that Steve-O had become a vegan for both health and compassionate reasons. He stated that "being vegan, I can tell you, has benefited every single area of my life". After the Jackass 3D stunt involving a ram (during which he injured his hand), he expressed some concern about doing stunts in the future that "mess with animals."

In June 2011, Steve-O released an autobiography entitled Professional Idiot: A Memoir, co-written with David Peisner. He stated that he follows only a strict vegan diet and is one of the many celebrities that got involved in the NOH8 project. In July, he received PETA's Nanci Alexander award for his "voice against cruelty". In 2013, due to his concern about animal rights, he stated that he was eating a vegan diet and that he did not wear fur or leather.

In December 2018, Steve-O revealed that he was no longer a vegan, as he had become a pescatarian. In 2019, he spoke out against "militant" vegans, stating that they do more harm than good.

In 2023, he founded the 501(c)(3) animal sanctuary Radical Ranch together with his then-fiance Lux Wright in Nashville, Tennessee.

== Filmography ==
=== Films ===
Year	Film	Role	Notes
2002	Jackass: The Movie	Himself	Writer
2003	Stupidity	Himself	Documentary
2003	Blind Horizon	Man with Hat in Final Scene	Credited as Stephen Glover
2006	The Dudesons Movie	Himself	Guest appearance
2006	National Lampoon's TV: The Movie	Various	Writer
2006	Jackass Number Two	Himself	Writer
2007	Jackass 2.5	Himself	Writer
2009	Passenger Side	Bar Patron	Credited as Stephen Glover
2010	Jackass 3D	Himself	Writer
2011	Jackass 3.5	Himself	Writer
2014	Lennon or McCartney	Himself	Short documentary film; interview clip
2015	Barely Lethal	Pedro	
2017	What the Health	Himself	Documentary film; interview clip
2017	Dumb: The Story of Big Brother Magazine	Himself	Documentary film
2018	Game Over, Man!	Himself	Cameo
2020	Guest House	Shred	
2022	Jackass Forever	Himself	Writer; Co-producer
2022	Jackass 4.5	Himself	Writer; Co-producer
2026	Jackass: Best and Last	Himself	Writer; Co-producer

=== Television ===
Year	Title	Role	Notes
2000–2001	Jackass	Himself	20 episodes
2001	Blind Date	Himself	1 episode
2002	Jackass Backyard BBQ	Himself	TV special
2002	MTV Cribs	Himself	1 episode
2002	2002 MTV Video Music Awards	Himself	Presenter
2002–2003	MADtv	Himself	Guest star 2 episodes
2003	2003 MTV Movie Awards	Himself	Guest appearance
2003	MTV Video Music Awards Latinoamérica 2003	Himself	Presenter
2003	The Bronx Bunny Show	Himself	1 episode
2003–2006	Wildboyz	Himself	Host; Co-creator; 32 episodes
2004–2006	Totally Busted	Himself	25 episodes
2005	America's Next Top Model	Himself	1 episode
2006	Love Island	Himself	2 episodes
2006	The Dudesons	Himself	1 episode Guest appearance
2006	The O.C.	First Marine	Episode 4.2 "The Gringos"
2006	24 Hours with...	Himself	1 episode
2006	MTV Cribs	Himself	1 episode
2006	2006 MTV Video Music Awards	Himself	Presenter
2006	WWE Raw	Himself	Episode: "October 16, 2006"
2007	Bam's Unholy Union	Himself	2 episodes
2007	Guys Choice	Himself	Winner Cockiest Award
2007	Dr. Steve-O	Dr. Steve-O	Creator; Presenter; 7 episodes
2008	Jackassworld.com: 24 Hour Takeover	Himself	TV special
2009	Dancing with the Stars	Himself	Finished 8th
2009	Nitro Circus	Himself	1 episode
2009	Steve-O: Demise and Rise	Himself	TV movie documentary Executive producer
2009	Glenn Martin DDS	Steve-O from Jackass	Episode 1.10; Voice-over
2010	2010 MTV Video Music Awards	Himself	Presenter
2010	Up Close with Carrie Keagan	Himself	1 episode
2010	Late Night with Jimmy Fallon	Himself	1 episode
2011	Germany's Next Topmodel	Himself	Episode 6.12
2011	Minute to Win It	Himself	
2011	The Comedy Central Roast of Charlie Sheen	Himself	TV special
2011	A Tribute to Ryan Dunn	Himself	TV movie documentary
2012–2013	Killer Karaoke	Himself	Host, on slice
2013	The Eric Andre Show	Himself	Guest; Episode 2.05
2013	The Soup	Himself	Guest Episode 10.2
2013	Ridiculousness	Himself	Guest host Episode 3.03
2014	Tom Green Live	Himself	Guest; Episode 3.10
2015	Celebrity Juice	Himself	1 episode
2015	The Jump	Himself	1 episode
2016	Steve-O: Guilty as Charged	Himself	TV special Writer; Executive producer
2016	Comedy Bang! Bang!	Himself	Episode 5.07
2016	Mr. Pickles	Pizza Guy	1 episode; voice only
2017	Billy Dilley's Super-Duper Subterranean Summer	Tommy X	1 episode; voice only
2018	Sky1's Revolution	Himself	
2018	Happy Together	S10CIL	1 episode
2018	Ridiculousness	Himself	Episode 11.15
2019	The Epic Tales of Captain Underpants	Lane Junkston	1 episode; voice only
2020	AEW Dynamite	Himself	1 episode
2020	The Eric André Show	Himself	1 episode
2021	Straight Up Steve Austin	Himself	1 episode
2021	Jackass Shark Week	Himself	TV special
2021	Josh Gates Tonight	Himself	1 episode
2022	Ridiculousness	Himself	1 episode
2022	Dish Nation	Himself	1 episode
2022	Entertainment Tonight	Himself	1 episode
2022	2022 MTV Movie & TV Awards	Himself	TV special
2022	UFC on ESPN: Vera vs. Cruz	Himself	Audience member
2022	CBS Saturday Morning	Himself	1 episode
2022	Good Morning America	Himself	1 episode
2022	Tamron Hall	Himself	1 episode
2022	Late Night with Seth Meyers	Himself	1 episode
2022	GMA3: What You Need to Know	Himself	1 episode
2022	Big Mouth	Himself	1 episode
2023	Today	Himself	1 episode
2023	HouseBroken	Banshee	Voice; 1 episode
2023	Sunday Brunch	Himself	1 episode
2023	UFC on ESPN: Sandhagen vs. Font	Himself	Audience member
2023	Name That Tune	Himself	Contestant; 1 episode
2023	The Drew Barrymore Show	Himself	1 episode
2023	Full Gear	Himself	Audience member
2024	Nöthin' but a Good Time: The Uncensored Story of '80s Hair Metal	Himself	1 episode Documentary series
2026	Nation's Dumbest	Himself	Season 1 participant

=== DVDs ===
Year	Title	Role	Notes
1999	Big Brother	Himself	
2001	Don't Try This at Home – The Steve-O Video Vol. 1	Himself	Executive producer Writer
2002	Don't Try This at Home – The Steve-O Video Vol. 2: The Tour	Himself	Writer
2003	Steve-O: Out on Bail	Himself	Writer
2004	Steve-O: The Early Years	Himself	Director; Writer; Documentary
2005	XYZ: Decade of Destruction	Himself	
2005	Steve-O: Gross Misconduct	Himself	Producer; Writer
2006	Ultimate Predator	Himself	Guest appearances
2007	Pinnernation	Himself	
2009	Pounding Out Randoms	Himself	
2009	Jackass: The Lost Tapes	Himself	Writer; Archived footage
2020	Steve-O: Gnarly	Himself	Writer; Executive producer
2023	Steve-O's Bucket List	Himself	Writer; Director; Executive producer

=== Video games ===
Year	Title	Role	Notes
2004	ESPN NFL 2K5	Himself	
2004	Tony Hawk's Underground 2	Himself	Guest appearance/Playable character
2007	Jackass: The Game	Himself	Voice and motion capture

=== Music videos ===
Year	Artist	Track	Role	Notes
2001	Shaquille O'Neal	"Psycho"	Himself	Unreleased
2002	CKY	"Flesh into Gear"	Himself	Archived footage
2002	Andrew W.K.	"We Want Fun"	Himself	
2006	Wolfmother	"Joker & the Thief"	Himself	
2006	Chris Pontius	"Karazy"	Himself	
2010	Weezer	"Memories"	Himself	
2012	Machine Gun Kelly	"Wild Boy (remix)"	Himself	
2013	Steel Panther	"Party Like Tomorrow Is the End of the World"	Himself	
2018	Hank von Hell	"Bum to Bum"	Himself	
2020	Blink-182	"Happy Days"	Himself	Cameo
2022	Starcrawler	"Roadkill"	Himself	
2023	Steve-O	"I Love My Girl... But"	Himself	Writer and performer

=== Web series ===
Year	Title	Role	Notes
2008	Hardly Working	Himself	1 episode: "Jackass"
2015	Jackass Reunion: 15 Years Later	Himself	Rolling Stone special
2015	The Slow Mo Guys	Himself	1 episode
2016	Game Grumps	Himself	1 episode
2016	DoubleToasted.com	Himself	1 episode Podcast
2016	Shane and Friends	Himself	1 episode
2017	H3h3Productions	Himself	2 episodes Podcast
2017	Hot Ones	Himself	1 episode
2018	Ultimate Expedition	Himself	10 episodes
2018	David Dobrik	Himself	1 episode
2018	The Sidemen Show	Himself	1 episode Guest appearance
2019	ImPaulsive Podcast	Himself	1 episode
2019	Bathroom Break Podcast	Himself	1 episode Podcast
2019	Wikipedia: Fact or Fiction?	Himself	1 episode
2020	The Nine Club	Himself	1 episode Podcast
2020	Scrambled	Himself	1 episode
2020	No Pain In Vain: The Shocking Life of Steve-O	Himself	Documentary
2021	Hot Ones	Himself	1 episode
2021	Do A Kickflip!	Himself	1 episode
2021	Sneaker Shopping	Himself	1 episode
2021	Howie Mandel Does Stuff	Himself	2 episodes Podcast
2021	Truth or Dab	Himself	1 episode
2021	Tales From the Trip	Himself	1 episode
2022	Snacked	Himself	1 episode
2022	What the Fudge?	Himself	1 episode Podcast; Guest appearance
2022	The Shittiest Podcast	Himself	1 episode
2022	Autocomplete Interview	Himself	1 episode
2022	Good Mythical Morning	Himself	1 episode
2023	The Pontius Show	Himself	1 episode Podcast
2023	The Adam Friedland Show	Himself	1 episode Podcast
2023	Hot Ones	Himself	1 episode
2023	Mythical Kitchen Last Meals	Himself	1 episode
2026	Hot Ones: Wing Pong	Himself	1 episode
2026	Jackass: The Podcast	Himself	2 episodes
2026	Let It Kill You: Jeff Tremaine	Himself	Documentary

== Discography ==
2008 – The Dumbest Asshole in Hip Hop (hosted by Whoo Kid)

The Dumbest Asshole in Hip Hop

Mixtape by Steve-O
- Released: April 29, 2008
- Recorded: 2005–2008
- Genres: Comedy hip-hop; dirty rap
- Length: 22:33
- Labels: West Coast Madness; Universal
- Producers: Red Spyda; DJ Whoo Kid

No.	Title	Length
1.	"Steve.O's Goofy Intro"	1:24
2.	"Hard as a Rock"	1:18
3.	"People Giggled" (interlude)	1:01
4.	"Crack Cocaine (Feels So Good)"	1:39
5.	"Discussions Begin" (interlude)	1:45
6.	"Poppin' Off"	1:22
7.	"Whoo Kid" (interlude)	3:17
8.	"Down with STD's"	4:21
9.	"I Wasn't Supposed To" (interlude)	0:48
10.	"Poke the Puss" (featuring Kool G Rap)	4:05
11.	"Steve.O's Stupid Outro"	1:40
Total length:		22:33

- Includes a bonus DVD (51:30)

== Bibliography ==
- Glover, Stephen (2011). Professional Idiot: A Memoir. Hyperion. ISBN 978-1401324339.
- Glover, Stephen (2022). A Hard Kick in the Nuts: What I've Learned from a Lifetime of Terrible Decisions. Grand Central Publishing. ISBN 9780306826757.
