= Carrie Keagan =

American TV personality, actress, and writer

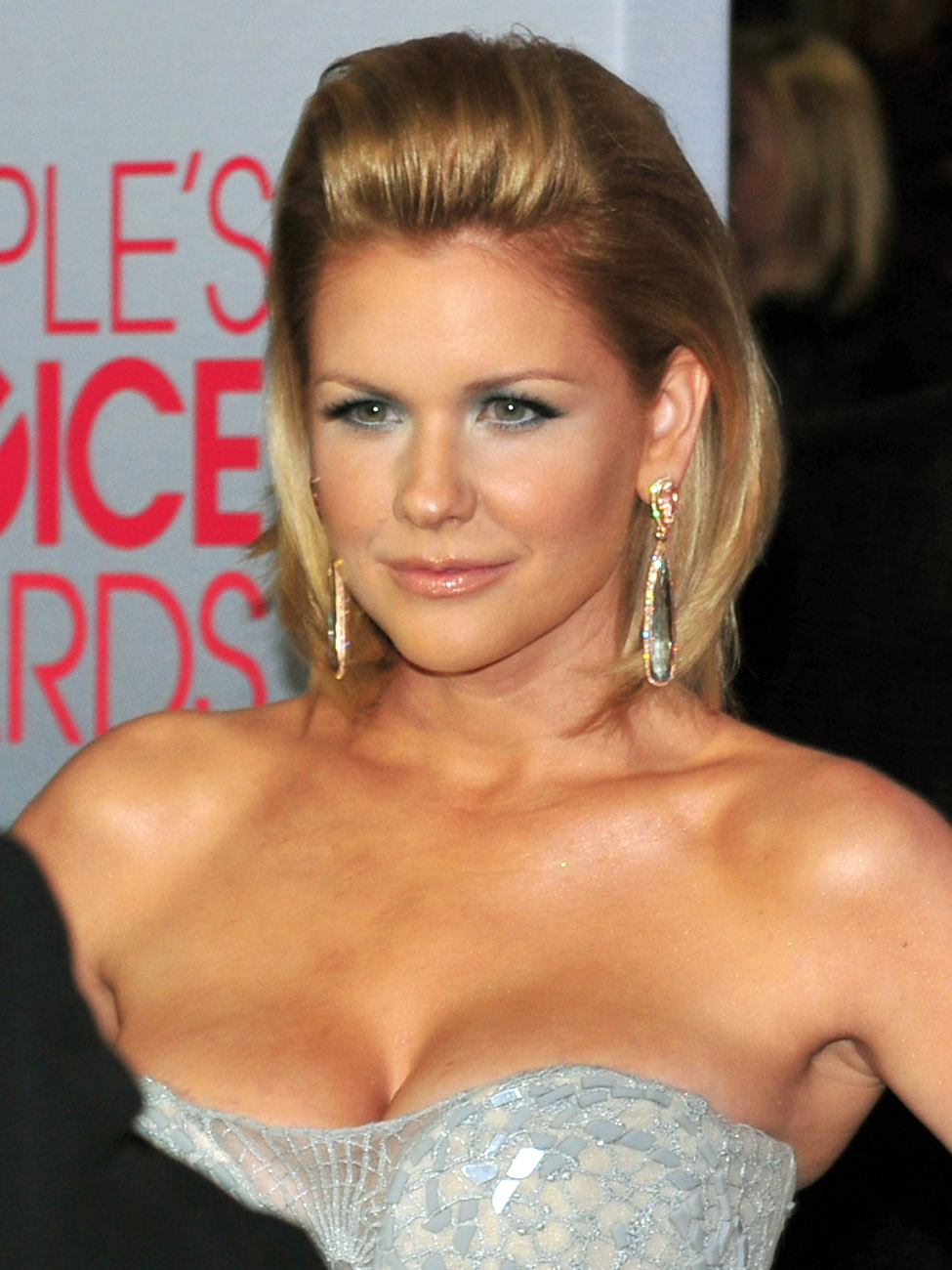
- Keagan at the 38th People's Choice Awards in 2012
- Born: July 4, 1980 (age 46)
- Occupations: Television personality, actress, writer, producer
- Years active: 2004-present
- Website: carriekeagan.com

Carrie Keagan (born July 4, 1980) is an American television personality, actress, writer, and producer, known as the host of Up Close with Carrie Keagan, Big Morning Buzz Live on VH1 and for her appearances as a panelist on Fox News Channel's Red Eye w/ Greg Gutfeld, the E! talk show Chelsea Lately, Vh1 Classic's Rock 'n' Roll Fantasy Camp and her numerous hosting duties for E!, VH1 and G4's Attack of the Show!.

== Early life ==
Carrie Keagan was born on July 4, 1980, in Buffalo, New York, US, as Carrie Nile, the niece of singer-songwriter Willie Nile. She grew up in Amherst, New York, and attended Buffalo State College. She changed her name c. 2002.

== Career ==
=== Hosting and reality television ===
Keagan hosts No Good TV's original programming, including series Up Close with Carrie Keagan and In Bed with Carrie. She guest co-hosted E!'s The Daily 10; co-anchored Emmy, Oscar and Golden Globe red-carpet coverage for TV Guide Network; and conducted backstage coverage on the Teen Choice Awards on Fox.

She has appeared on numerous Mark Burnett productions, including VH1 Classic's Rock'n’Roll Fantasy Camp and MTV's Rock Band Battle and P. Diddy's Starmaker. She has co-hosted many events for VH1, including the red carpet show broadcast for the Critics' Choice Awards in 2008 and 2009, and the 3rd annual VH1 Rock Honors: The Who. She produced and hosted two seasons of VH1 Classic's One Hit Wonders and Now: That's What I Call Dance Music. In 2010, she appeared as a guest host on episodes of G4's Attack of the Show!, including several installments in which she appears as a parody version of the DC Comics superhero Power Girl. In 2011 she began hosting her own show Big Morning Buzz Live on VH1. Keagan left the show in 2013 and was replaced by Nick Lachey. In August 2014, Keagan helped raise awareness of the disease ALS by participating in the Ice Bucket Challenge. On January 28, 2016, she was announced as one of the contestants on The New Celebrity Apprentice, also known as Celebrity Apprentice 8. On January 2, 2017, she was the first contestant fired, finishing in 16th place and earning no money for her charity, The Humane Society of the United States. On November 18, 2018, she co-hosted the first ever Gamer’s Choice Awards.

=== Acting and modeling ===
Keagan had a recurring role in the Comedy Central series Reno 911! and several roles and cameos in movies, including Superbad, The Hangover, Miss March, American Pie: Book of Love, Smokin' Aces 2: Assassins' Ball and V/H/S: Viral. Keagan was featured as a "Babe of the Month" in Playboy magazine in July 2008, was photographed by television producer Brannon Braga for Femme Fatales Magazine and has been featured on the cover of Garage magazine.
