= Rhonda Britten =

American life coach

- Born: Rhonda Wiitanen; Two Harbors, Minnesota
- Education: BS from University of Minnesota & MFA Vermont College of Fine Arts
- Occupations: Author; Life coaching Television/actress
- Years active: 1995 Founded the Fearless Living Institute
- Spouse: Divorced (Carl Mikulecky 1990-1998)
- Website: https://FearlessLiving.org

Rhonda Britten (born Rhonda Wiitanen in Two Harbors, Minnesota) is an American life coach. She has appeared in over 600 episodes of reality television, authored four bestsellers including her seminal work "Fearless Living" (translated into 16 languages), and founded the Fearless Living Institute, home of Fearless Living Life Coach Certification Program.

She has been a Life Coach on television and appeared for three seasons as the head Life Coach on the NBC show, "Starting Over." Named its "Most Valuable Player" by The New York Times and heralded as "America's Favorite Life Coach," she brings the neuroscience of fear down to earth giving you a path out of "not being good enough" using the "Wheels" methodology she developed that saved her own life.

== Early life ==
She was the middle child of three girls, and was the target of her divorced father's physical and emotional abuse. At the age of 14, she was the only witness to her father shooting and killing her mother and then shooting himself, which was one of the primary reasons she does counseling and life coaching.

In her twenties, she appeared in Married... with Children episode Do Ya Think I'm Sexy (1990) as sexy Donna; and as a student in the 22 February 1991 TV episode of Perfect Strangers.

== Career ==
In 1995, she started the Fearless Living Institute after trying to commit suicide three times and realizing that fear was at her problems' core. In an interview with Terra Wellington about the basis of the Institute, Rhonda said "No one can be fearless alone. But, you have to be willing to change your life." That same year she was the "life doctor" on a British reality show called "Help Me, Rhonda," which ran until 2003.

She is perhaps best known as being the lead life coach on the reality TV series Starting Over from 2003-2006. During her run on the show, she, along with her co-hosts, Iyanla Vanzant, Dr. Stan Katz, and the crew won a Daytime Emmy; a first for any reality show.

In 2010, she starred as the life coach on VH1's Celebrity Fit Club's Season 7.

=== Author ===
She is the author of four best-selling books: "Fearless Living: Live Without Excuses and Love Without Regret" (2001)."Fearless Loving" (2004), "Change Your Life in 30 Days" (2005), "Do I Look Fat In This?: Get Over Your Body and On With Your Life" (2007), and 10th Anniversary Issue: Fearless Living: Live Without Excuses and Love Without Regret" (2011).
