= El Mundo Real =

- Genre: Reality
- Created by: Mary-Ellis Bunim; Jonathan Murray
- Based on: The Real World
- Country of origin: Mexico
- Original language: Spanish
- No. of seasons: 1
- No. of episodes: 12

Production
- Executive producers: Gil Goldschein; Julie Pizzi; Paola Pérez de la Garza; Jonathan Singer; Jonathan Murray
- Running time: 23-25 minutes
- Production companies: Bunim/Murray Productions; MTV Studios

Original release
- Network: Facebook Watch
- Release: June 13 – August 29, 2019

El Mundo Real (Spanish for The Real World) is the Mexican/Latin American version of MTV's reality television series The Real World. The series is produced by Bunim/Murray Productions and MTV Studios, being part of the new distribution deal for the franchise with Facebook Watch, which includes the revival of the American series, together with the Thailand-based season. The series was announced on October 8, 2018, and the series debuted on June 13, 2019. The series was primarily filmed in Mexico City, Mexico.

It's not the first time the franchise (not including spin-off The Challenge) has filmed in Mexico, as the American version's twenty-second season took place in the country just ten years prior to this version's debut.

Set primarily in Mexico City, the show features 7 strangers living together in a house located in a centric neighborhood of the city where their lives were taped between March and May 2019, with the show debuting weeks later. Casting calls for this season were opened in late 2018.

== Episode distribution ==
Similar to both Atlanta & Bangkok seasons, under the new distribution, daily drops are uploaded Monday through Wednesday on the official Facebook Watch pages for each of the three franchises, with these daily bits being uploaded at around noon (UTC-5).

The weekly episodes premiered on Thursdays at 9PM (UTC-5). This season is composed of 12 episodes.

== Cast ==
Cast Member	Age^{1}	Hometown	Biography
Sofia Rivera Torres	26	Mexico City	Sofía was born and raised in San Diego, California but moved to Mexico when she turned 16 because she wanted to find her roots. She currently works in media as a TV host, and also works as a model. She feels grateful when she impacts people's lives in a positive way and finds that her mission in life is to communicate something. She also aspires to be on Forbes' 30 Under 30 ranking.
María Fernanda "Mafer" Valdés	22	Martínez de la Torre, Veracruz	An aspiring fashion blogger and journalist, Mafer won the online vote held by MTV Latin America for the show's 7th roommate spot. She defines herself as loud, caring and a good person. She loves to live life and likes having her friends going out well-dressed. Mafer has had bad experiences when it comes to relationships.
Diego Garciasela	19	Cuernavaca, Morelos	Hailing from an affluent family, Diego's biggest fear is failure, and his life goal is to be a successful and wealthy businessman. He's usually not around people who are not from the same socioeconomic status as his. For Diego, this will be the first time he's ever been far away from home. His favorite type of girls are usually blondes, but in the end, he ends up falling for brunettes. He also believes that money can take you far in life, even with women. In 2021 he joined the cast of Acapulco Shore.
Emilio Betancourt	21	Guadalajara, Jalisco	Emilio has been a fighter since he was young. Lost a limb due to an accident at age 13, as revealed to his roommates on Episode 1. He says that this experience for him will be giving a platform for those who do not have a voice. For him, exercising is not only a getaway but also a way to find stability in life.
Daniela (Hannya torres)(negraconda)	25	Guadalajara, Jalisco	She's a male-to-female transgender and is currently on her transition process. Dany is very straight forward and expects people to be the same way to her. She also advocates for those who are marginalized in society. She does drag and her character is named "NegraConda".
Melissa "Mel" Gómez	22	Tijuana, Baja California	Besides playing soccer professionally, Melissa also likes playing the guitar. She knew she was gay at around age 14–15, and for years she "dated" guys in order to disguise her true self to her family. For her, the show will be the way to come out as a lesbian to her family and to give herself a chance of living as her authentic self.
Israel "El Chikitin" Nonthe	24	Cardonal, Hidalgo	He comes from a small village in the state of Hidalgo, and his background is of indigenous origin. Israel has always been surrounded by family. His life philosophy is about embracing the world we live in and take care of it. An aspiring rapper, he raps in Hñähñu', an aboriginal language from the region he's from. On the show, he expects to share more about his upbringing and aboriginal culture with his fellow housemates.

== Episodes ==
No.	Title	Original release date
1	"Week 1: The Real World is in Mexico City!"	June 13, 2019
Seven Mexicans that have nothing in common and that would not pick each other to live under the same roof, will share house, food and other amenities, while trying to get to understand each other and live besides their differences.
2	"Week 2: The House Breaks Up"	June 20, 2019
The first world and the third world collide, all because of dirty dishes left behind in the kitchen. Diego wants to hook up with Sofía and starts to make some moves. Melissa gives her roommates a tough call on reality.
3	"Week 3: Roommate Misunderstandings"	June 27, 2019
Dany breaks down after being misgendered while exiting the gym. The roommates tell all of their dirty business from their individual confessionals, and this leaves Israel very surprised, as he is the center of the meanest comments. Mafer has a tough time in a phone conversation with her mother, and leaves her in a breakdown, as she struggles to stop being so dependent on her mother.
4	"Week 4: Welcome to my World!"	July 4, 2019
Sofía gets passes for Mercedes Benz Fashion Week México, and although the spots she gets are limited she sees a positive reaction from her roommates. Emilio has trouble with a girl he met back home and how their relationship will work. Dany feels that Israel has lost his identity by spending too much time with Diego.
5	"Week 5: It's All About Love"	July 11, 2019
Diego's ego suffers a big hit when an Argentinian model flirts with Sofía, and begins setting her up to give her a taste of her own medicine. Surprising her roommates, Dany, feeling homesick and missing her partner, confesses she is ready to give it all up and go back to Guadalajara.
6	"Week 6: The Truth Comes to Light"	July 18, 2019
Melissa invites her mother to Mexico City, with the main purpose of coming out to her as a lesbian. Even though Diego and Sofía take a step to deepen their relationship, the way they treat Israel gets called out by the rest of the house.
7	"Week 7: Out of the Comfort Zone"	July 25, 2019
The roommates plant a seed in Diego's head, where theory says that Sofía is using him for camera time. Meanwhile, Israel prepares for a performance of his rap duo Membda, meanwhile Dany's alter ego, Negraconda, comes out to shine.
8	"Week 8: First Loves"	August 1, 2019
Melissa's partner visits Mexico City, but this visit leaves her at odd between either staying and live the experience or go back home. Diego gets in trouble with his roommies after bothering all of them while asleep as he returns from partying with Mafer and Sofía, after this issue, Emilio confronts him and shares his thoughts on the matter. Mafer lands her first gig in the fashion world, while Emilio leads his first conference in Mexico City, what makes it even more special is that it was a special talk for children currently being treated with cancer.
9	"Week 9: All About What Really Matters"	August 8, 2019
Diego's mouth causes trouble in the house, by making inappropriate comments to Melissa when asked about her relationship, which ends up bothering Sofía a lot. At a charity event, Diego gets extremely jealous and leaves, his indecision about their relationship leads Sofía to make a final decision. Israel's mother visits the house, and this scares him since he has had awkward moments with his roommates. Emilio lets it loose during a boy's night out.
10	"Week 10: Vacation Time!"	August 15, 2019
The roommate's learn that it is time for a well deserved vacation to San Luis Potosí, however, besides their baggage, other stuff will come with them. Emiliano and Israel will face their biggest fears, while Sofía understands that beauty is completely subjective.
11	"Week 11: I'm Not Running, I'm Not Screaming, I'm Not Pushing"	August 22, 2019
Diego gets a harsh reality check when it comes to money, and lands his first job waitressing. Melissa receives stressing news from home, as her mom lets her know that her father has learned that she is gay. After visiting two music producers, Israel's fears land him into trouble, on what was looking like a promising visit.
12	"Week 12: Every Beginning, Has an End"	August 29, 2019
The roommates become aware that the end is closer than what they think, and to take advantage of their final days together, they embark themselves in creating memories that will remain tattooed forever. The end of this experience hits Israel very hard, as he seems not ready to go back home.
