= The Will (TV series) =

- Genre: Reality
- Created by: Mike Fleiss
- Presented by: Tony Noakes
- Country of origin: United States
- Original language: English
- No. of seasons: 1
- No. of episodes: 6 (5 unaired)

Production
- Executive producer: Mike Fleiss
- Producers: Martin Hilton; Adam Reed; Tony Noakes
- Running time: 60 minutes

Original release
- Network: CBS
- Release: January 8, 2005

The Will is an American reality television series on CBS that lasted only one episode, shown on January 8, 2005. It centers on the "Benefactor", a multi-millionaire from Arizona named Bill Long. Ten of his friends and relatives compete in a series of challenges to win the right to inherit his "prized possession", a large Kansas ranch.

The show was created by Mike Fleiss, who produced The Bachelor for ABC. The Will is one of only a handful of series in American history to be pulled after one episode. In the case of The Will, cancellation was due to very low ratings. Despite receiving a heavy promotional push from CBS, the program averaged only 4.2 million viewers during its 8:00 – 9:30 p.m. ET/PT time slot, which made it CBS's lowest-ranked show of the week. The following Saturday, the network replaced it with a re-run of Cold Case, a crime drama. The cancellation defied expectations published in some media that the show would be a hit, and would become a topic of conversation among viewers.

The quick cancellation of The Will was lampooned on an episode of the ABC late night talk show Jimmy Kimmel Live! with a montage of clips from the show, and the message "Will Miss You — ‌January 8, 2005 – January 8, 2005."

Although it was initially reported that the five remaining episodes could appear on an American cable network, they eventually did air on the Fox Reality Channel not long afterwards, and all six episodes aired in New Zealand beginning in December 2005. In the final episode, Long's fourth wife Penny (widely seen as the show's villain) became the overall winner.

In 2005, The Will was one of several television programs cited in a class-action lawsuit filed by the Writers Guild of America concerning labor law violations.

== Episodes ==
	Protected Heir	Cut from the Will
Episode 1:	Josh	Mickey (Bill's Best Friend)
Episode 1:	Billy	Kristin (Ashley's Ex-Girlfriend)
Episode 2:	Penny	Danielle (Trusted Employee)
Episode 3:	Bette	Crystal - Withdrew (Close Family Friend)
Episode 4:	Billy, Josh	Ashley (Penny's Son)
Episode 5:	Bette	Josh (Bill's Adoptive Son)
Episode 6:	Penny; Sole Heir (Bill's Wife)	Scott (Penny's Brother)
Episode 6:	Penny; Sole Heir (Bill's Wife)	Bette (Penny's Mother)
Episode 6:	Penny; Sole Heir (Bill's Wife)	Billy (Bill's Son)

== See also ==
- List of television series canceled after one episode
