= After Happily Ever After =

2022 reality television series

- Genre: Reality competition
- Presented by: Bow Wow
- Country of origin: United States
- Original language: English
- No. of series: 1
- No. of episodes: 8

Production
- Executive producers: Julie Pizzi; Erica Ross; Andrea Richter; Tiffany Lea Williams; Angela Aguilera
- Production company: Bunim/Murray Productions

Original release
- Network: BET
- Release: October 19 – December 14, 2022

After Happily Ever After is an American reality competition series that premiered on October 19, 2022 on BET. The series is hosted by Bow Wow.

== Episodes ==
No.	Title	Original release date	U.S. viewers (millions)
1	"Can Your Ex Find Your Next Love?"	October 19, 2022	0.43
2	"New Connections Jealous Exes"	October 26, 2022	0.38
3	"Can One Woman's Ex Be Another's Next?"	November 2, 2022	0.44
4	"A 'Suite' Encounter"	November 9, 2022	0.42
Guest: Iyanla Vanzant
5	"Iyanla Vanzant to the Rescue"	November 16, 2022	0.41
Guest: Iyanla Vanzant
6	"Major Ex-plosions"	November 23, 2022	0.45
7	"Daters Have All the Power"	November 30, 2022	0.44
8	"And They Lived After, Happily Ever After"	December 14, 2022	0.48
