= The Quest (2003 film) =

- Directed by: Jason A. Carbone; Mike Fleiss
- Produced by: Mike Fleiss
- Starring: see below
- Edited by: Bob Brooks; Julius Ramsay; Hudson Smith
- Production company: Next Entertainment
- Distributed by: Universal Pictures
- Release date: 2003
- Running time: 80 minutes
- Country: United States
- Language: English

The Quest, also known as The Quest- Drunken Jackass in some international markets, is a 2003 American reality film directed by Jason A. Carbone and Mike Fleiss, the latter better known for producing The Bachelor and The Bachelorette.

== Cast ==
- Eddie Macsalka (as Edward Macsalka)
- Hans Swolfs
- Alexander Loyless
- Josh Morris
- Johnny Milord (as Johnny 'Kansas' Milord)
- Matt Huntington
- Bryan Codi
- Andrew Ghertner
- Kyle Beard

== Production ==
The Quest was shot over the course of 9 days in Cabo San Lucas during the 2003 Spring break following six University of Colorado students on their trip to help their friend lose his virginity.

== Release ==
After New Line Cinema moved up the release of their similarly themed reality film The Real Cancun, Universal Pictures pulled its original planned release in order to release it later in the year. After The Real Cancun bombed at the box office, Universal was reportedly weighed their options on how to best handle the release for The Quest in order to avoid a repeat of the failure of The Real Cancun. Prior to being pulled from the release schedule, the film had been intended for release on May 9, 2003.
