= Sofia Rivera Torres =

American TV presenter and radio host

Sofía Rivera Torres
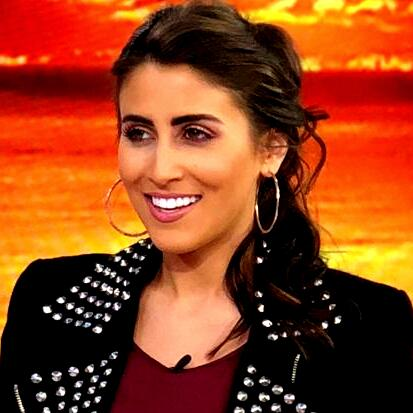
- Rivera Torres at a TV Set, 2018
- Born: Sofía Rivera Torres Martín del Campo; 18 September 1992 (age 33); San Diego, California
- Occupations: Actress,TV Presenter,Model, Internet Celebrity
- Known for: El Mundo Real
- Spouse: Eduardo Videgaray (m. 2020)
- Website: https://www.sofiariveratorres.com/

Sofía Rivera Torres (born Sofía Rivera Torres Martin del Campo, San Diego, California, September 18, 1992) is an American actress, TV presenter, radio host, model, internet celebrity and reality television personality.

Rivera Torres married TV Presenter Eduardo Videgaray in a small ceremony in Mexico City in October 2020.

== Career ==
Rivera Torres began her television career in 2014, as the host for All Access, an EDM TV Show which aired through E! Entertainment Television Latin America. The following year, she hosted The Release, also an EDM TV Show, produced by Vice Media and broadcast through Canal Sony. In 2016 she joined Imagen Noticias as entertainment news presenter, aired through Imagen Televisión. and started in the reality television show El Mundo Real through Facebook Watch.

Rivera Torres regularly contributes as a writer for Excélsior Mexican newspaper and has performed in two feature films: Café Con Leche Directed by Ray Gallardo and El Vestido directed by Roque Falabella.

Currently, she co-hosts Imagen Televisión's late night talkshow ¡Qué Importa! and most recently, Rivera Torres joined the cast of Si nos dejan a Spanish-language telenovela that premiered on Univision on 1 June 2021 portraying Mabel Rangel .

== Filmography ==
Film
Year	Title	Roles	Notes
2020	At the Frontera	Culebra	
2022	El vestido de la novia	Fernanda	

Television
Year	Title	Roles	Notes
2021	Si nos dejan	Mabel Rangel	Series regular
2022	La noche del Diablito	Herself	Episode: "Con uno o con varios"
2022-23	Cabo	Karen Escalante	Series regular
2023	Volver a caer	Saleswoman	Episode: "Lo que está por venir"
2023	La casa de los famosos México	Herself	Houseguest
2024	Tu vida es mi vida	Natalia	Series regular
