= Starting Over (TV series) =

- Genre: Reality television
- Created by: Mary-Ellis Bunim; Jonathan Murray
- Starring: Rhonda Britten; Stan Katz; Iyanla Vanzant; Rana Walker
- Country of origin: United States
- Original language: English
- No. of seasons: 3

Production
- Executive producers: Jonathan Murray; Millee Taggart-Ratcliffe
- Camera setup: Multi-camera
- Production companies: Bunim/Murray Productions; NBC Enterprises; NBCUniversal Television Distribution

Original release
- Network: Syndication
- Release: September 8, 2003 – May 24, 2006

Starting Over is an American daytime reality television series that follows the lives of women who are experiencing difficulty in their lives and want to make changes, with the help of life coaches. Six women at a time work to overcome obstacles and meet personal goals. When it is determined that a woman has met all her goals, she "graduates" from the house and is replaced by a new roommate. On the other hand, if it is determined that she has not met her goals, she could be put on probation, or asked to leave.

== History ==
The first season of Starting Over, in 2003-2004, was set in Chicago. The show used the voice-over narration of Sylvia Villagran. It featured life coaches Rhonda Britten and Rana Walker with a relocation to California and introduction of a consulting psychologist.

The second season saw the show moved to the Hollywood Hills of Los Angeles. Rana Walker was replaced by Iyanla Vanzant as the second life coach. Stan Katz joined the cast as the psychologist. During the second season, it was notable that in addition to the six women, for the first few months, there was also a baby in the mix. Josie, the holdover from the Chicago house, had given birth to a girl, Chloe, at season's end; and in that time in the Los Angeles house, she was included and doted on by the women, the life coaches and Dr. Katz. Josie was also unique, in that she was the only woman in the three-year history of Starting Over to have changed life coaches. Since Rana, her original primary life coach, had been replaced by Iyanla and she already had three clients, she gained Rhonda, who had been her support life coach in the first season, as her primary life coach.

The third season was filmed in the Reseda district of Los Angeles. For the first three weeks of the third season, which aired from 2005 until 2006, couples worked together with the life coaches. Although men have been guests of the women on the show, this was the first time that men appeared on the show specifically to work on their issues.

Starting Over was cancelled after three seasons, with the show airing its final rerun on September 8, 2006. Many of the stations airing Starting Over were offered a variety talk show hosted by former Will & Grace star Megan Mullally as a replacement by NBC Universal Television Distribution, which distributed both series. However, Mullally's show was a ratings flop and NBC Universal announced its immediate cancellation on January 4, 2007, with the final episode airing on January 9 after fourteen weeks on the air. NBCU quickly put together a package of Starting Over reruns, which were offered to stations to fill the gap left by the cancellation of The Megan Mullally Show, and launched them on January 26, 2007 to fill out the remainder of the season. Since 2013, Canadian Network One started airing the series.

== Cast ==
=== Life coaches ===
- Rhonda Britten (Seasons 1-3)
- Rana Walker (Season 1)
- Iyanla Vanzant (Seasons 2-3)

=== Consulting psychologist ===
- Stan Katz (Seasons 2-3)

=== Narrator ===
- Sylvia Villagran (Seasons 1-3)

=== Roommates ===
==== Season 1 ====
- Maureen Goodman (deceased): 1st graduate, and roommate during season 2, Roommate: Nyanza Davis, Esq.
- Nyanza L. Moore, Esq. (Nyanza Davis, Esq. at the time of the show), 1st African American roommate, 2nd graduate. Roommate: Maureen Goodman.
- Christine Carroll
- Andy Paige: Season 1 graduate, Stylist
- Cassandra "Cassie" Romanelli
- Lori
- Kimberlyn
- Candy Oxnam
- Audrey Tucker
- Greg (from Provo)
- Teresa Crone
- Brenda Starr Wilson
- Hannah Buchanan
- Karen Knoxcox
- Christine H.
- PJ Anbey: Season 1 and special appearances season 2
- Erika Jackson
- Rain Adams
- Amy Harkin Goodrich: daughter of Iowa Senator Tom Harkin, and wife of NBA basketball player Steve Goodrich
- Susan Santa Cruz
- Hailey Murray: niece of Starting Over co-creator/executive producer Jonathan Murray, and daughter of Starting Over graduate Lynnell
- Lynnell Stage: mother of Starting Over graduate Hailey
- Josie Harris: Seasons 1-2
- Leah

==== Season 2 ====
- Sinae VanHaastert (Season 2)
- Deborah (Season 2)
- Kim Bookout (Season 2)
- Josie Harris (Seasons 1-2. Her goal was not completed when season 1 wrapped production.)
- Chloe Harris (Josie's infant daughter. Seasons 1-2)
- Jennifer Bernhardt (Season 2)
- Towanda Braxton Hall (Season 2. Towanda Braxton Carter at the time of filming. Sister of R&B singer Toni Braxton.)
- Maureen Jacobs Goodman (Season 1 Graduate. Temporary Season 2 housemate. Deceased)
- Vanessa Atler (Season 2)
- Bethany Marshall Holden (Season 2 and appearances on Season 3. Bethany Marshall at the time of the show's filming)
- Megg Berry (Season 2)
- Denise Lamberti
- Katrinda "Candy" Oxnam
- Cassie Mizer (Seasons 2-3) Season 2 graduate, and roommate during season 3
- Sommer White (Seasons 2-3. Sommer was asked to leave during season 2 but was given a second chance to complete what she started during season 3.)
- Allison Stanley (Seasons 2-3. Allison returned during season 3 with a second goal.)
- Renee Panis
- Rachael West
- Tess
- Layne
- Karen

==== Season 3: Couples Bootcamp ====
- Jaclyn Johnsen Romero
- Michael Romero
- Kacie Fann
- Simon David
- Cheryl Kohagen
- Troy Kohagen
- Jenn Marini
- Lou Marini

==== Season 3 Housemates ====
- Jessica Holland
- T.J.
- Jill Tracy
- Christina Bounds
- Allison Stanley (Season 2 graduate with a second goal to achieve during season 3.)
- Lisa Noonan
- Christie Duran
- Sommer White (She was asked to leave during season 2 but was given a second chance during season 3)
- Kim Gildart Blodgett (deceased)
- Lisa Castaneda Markano
- Lisa A.
- Niambi Janae Dennis
- Jodi Isaacs
- Antonia Andullerro

=== Guest coaches ===
- Steve Rhode - Money, credit and debt coach (Season 1)
- Sean Albrecht - Corporate telemarketing coach (Season 1)
- Janae Whittaker - Life Coach- specializing in transition out of sport (Season 2)
- Lisa Popeil - Singing voice coach (Season 2)
