= Mary-Ellis Bunim =

American television producer

- Born: July 9, 1946; Northampton, Massachusetts, U.S.
- Died: January 29, 2004 (aged 57); Burbank, California, U.S.
- Occupations: Television producer, TV series co-creator
- Children: 1

Mary-Ellis Bunim (July 9, 1946 – January 29, 2004) was an American television producer and co-creator of MTV's The Real World and Road Rules.

== Biography ==
A native of Massachusetts, Bunim began her career in daytime dramas. She oversaw more than 2,500 hours of programming as executive producer of Search for Tomorrow (1974–1981), As the World Turns (1981–1984), Santa Barbara (1984–1987) and Loving (1989–1990). She subsequently developed numerous shows in her job as VP of tape programs for New World Entertainment.

Bunim founded Bunim-Murray with business partner Jonathan Murray. Agent Mark Itkin of the William Morris Agency put the two together to develop a scripted soap opera for MTV. When that was too expensive, they decided to try an unscripted soap and The Real World was born. "We knew within 20 minutes of shooting that we had a show," Bunim said.

Her company, Bunim/Murray Productions, spearheaded the reality show genre. Among the numerous other reality programs and reality game show programs that Bunim co-created over the years, include: Road Rules; Love Cruise; Making the Band; The Challenge (formerly known as Real World/Road Rules Challenge and spun off from The Real World and Road Rules); the reality feature film, The Real Cancun; the real-life daily syndication, Starting Over; as well as Fox's The Simple Life.

== Death ==
Bunim died in Los Angeles at 57, after a lengthy battle with breast cancer.

She is interred at Forest Lawn Memorial Park (Hollywood Hills).

Bunim and Murray were inducted into the Television Academy Hall of Fame in 2012.
