= The Cougar (TV series) =

2009 reality television series

- Genre: Reality television
- Presented by: Vivica A. Fox
- Country of origin: United States
- Original language: English
- No. of seasons: 1
- No. of episodes: 8

Production
- Executive producer: Mike Fleiss
- Production locations: Los Angeles, California
- Running time: 45–48 minutes
- Production companies: Next Entertainment; Warner Horizon Television; TV Land Prime Original Production

Original release
- Network: TV Land
- Release: April 15 – June 3, 2009

The Cougar is an American reality television series broadcast by TV Land. The series premiered on April 15, 2009, for an eight-episode run, and it concluded on June 3, 2009. Filmed in Los Angeles, California, the series followed Stacey Anderson, a 40-year-old cougar, in search for a partner among a group of 20 men, all of whom were in their 20s. The men were required to participate in a series of romantic challenges; Anderson assessed the men's performances and subjected the men to weekly elimination ceremonies. Whichever man remained at the end of the competition had the option of pursuing a long-term relationship with Anderson. The series was hosted by American actor Vivica A. Fox.

== Overview ==
Over eight weekly hour-long episodes, the young men (all in their 20s) compete for a chance to have a long term relationship with Stacey Anderson, a 40-year-old real estate agent and divorced mother of four from Arizona. The show is very similar in format to The Bachelorette, except that instead of using roses to determine who stays and who goes, the Cougar uses the "Kiss Off". During the Kiss Off, each contestant gives the Cougar a kiss and if she kisses on the lips, the contestant stays, but if she gives her cheek, the contestant is out.

== The "Cubs" ==
Contestant	Age	Occupation	Episode Eliminated
Jimmy Heck	23	fitness model and personal trainer	Winner
Colt Straub	25	musician	Episode 8
Travis	21		Episode 7
Adam Mills	25	event manager	Episode 6
Joe	25	bartender	Episode 5
Jon	23	customer engineer	Episode 5
David	25	advertising consultant	Episode 4
Austin	24	bartender	Episode 4
Ryan	29	bartender	Episode 4
Nick	27	police officer	Episode 3
Kai	28	supervisor	Episode 3
Johnny	23	martial arts trainer	Episode 3
J.D.	24	account manager	Episode 2
Jim	22	caterer	Episode 2
Tom	26	mobile company manager	Episode 2
Kevin	23	UPS driver	Episode 1
Bodie	23	Cabana boy	Episode 1
Brad	24	bartender	Episode 1
Rich	29	bartender	Episode 1
Grant Mills	25		Episode 1 (withdrew)

Adam and Grant are twin brothers.
Travis, the youngest contestant, had his first legal adult beverage with the cougar.

== The Kiss-Off ==
Stacey's Call-out Order
Order	Name	Episodes							
Order	Name	1	2	3	4	5	6	7	8
1	Adam	Travis^{1}	Jon^{1}	Joe^{1}	Colt^{1}	Travis^{3}	Jimmy	Colt	Jimmy
2	Austin	Colt	Adam^{2}	Jon	Joe	Colt	Colt	Jimmy	Colt
3	Bodie	Adam	David	Colt	Travis	Jimmy^{2}	Travis	Travis	
4	Brad	Jon	Colt^{2}	Travis	Jon^{2}	Adam^{3}	Adam		
5	Colt	David	Travis^{2}	Ryan	Adam	Joe			
6	David	Jimmy	Austin	Austin^{2}	Jimmy	Jon^{2}			
7	Kai	Joe	Nick	David^{2}	David				
8	Grant	Jim	Joe	Jimmy	Austin				
9	J.D.	Nick	Ryan^{2}	Adam^{2}	Ryan^{2}				
10	Jim	Kai	Kai	Kai					
11	Jimmy	Johnny	Johnny	Johnny^{2}					
12	Joe	Austin	Jimmy	Nick					
13	Johnny	J.D.	Jim						
14	Jon	Tom	J.D.						
15	Kevin	Ryan	Tom^{2}						
16	Nick	Kevin							
17	Rich	Bodie							
18	Ryan	Brad							
19	Tom	Rich							
20	Travis	Grant							

The contestant won The Cougar.
The contestant was eliminated during the regular Kiss-Off.
The contestant was eliminated during his group date.
The contestant withdrew from the competition.

- ^{1} The contestant won the Solo Date Challenge and went on a solo date with Stacey.
- ^{2} The contestant won the Group Date Challenge and went on a group date with Stacey.
- ^{3} In Episode 5, Stacey picked Adam and Travis for a date because she felt she was losing them. Adam and Travis did not win the challenge.
- In Episode 7, Stacey had a solo date with all the remaining contestants.

== Statistics ==
Place	Name	Episodes							
Place	Name	1	2	3	4	5	6	7	8
1	Jimmy	SAFE	BTM2	SAFE	BTM2	WIN	SAFE	BTM2	WINNER
2	Colt	SAFE	WIN	SAFE	WIN	SAFE	SAFE	SAFE	OUT
3	Travis	WIN	WIN	SAFE	SAFE	SAFE^{3}	BTM2	OUT	
4	Adam	SAFE	WIN	WIN	SAFE	BTM2^{3}	OUT		
5	Joe	SAFE	SAFE	WIN	SAFE	OUT			
6	Jon	SAFE	WIN	SAFE	WIN	OUT			
7	David	SAFE	SAFE	WIN	OUT				
8	Austin	SAFE	SAFE	WIN	OUT				
9	Ryan	BTM2	WIN	SAFE	OUT				
10	Nick	SAFE	SAFE	OUT					
11	Kai	SAFE	SAFE	OUT					
12	Johnny	SAFE	SAFE	OUT					
13	J.D.	SAFE	OUT						
14	Jim	SAFE	OUT						
15	Tom	SAFE	OUT						
16	Kevin	OUT							
17	Bodie	OUT							
18	Brad	OUT							
19	Rich	OUT							
20	Grant	QUIT							

The contestant won The Cougar.
The contestant won the challenge and went on group date
The contestant won the challenge and went on solo date
The contestant was eliminated.
The contestant won the challenge and was in the Bottom 2
The contestant was in the Bottom 2
The contestant won a group date but was eliminated.
The contestant was eliminated during his group date.
The contestant withdrew from the competition.

- ^{3} In Episode 5, Stacey picked Adam and Travis for a date because she felt she was losing them. Adam and Travis did not win the challenge.
- In Episode 7, Stacey had a solo date with all the remaining contestants.

== Episodes ==
Episode	First Airing
Meet the Cougar	April 15, 2009
40 Years Young	April 22, 2009
Men vs. Boys	April 29, 2009
Truth and Consequences	May 6, 2009
The Claws Comes Out	May 13, 2009
Meet the Families	May 20, 2009
Vegas Nights	May 27, 2009
The Last Kiss? (Season Finale)	June 3, 2009

=== Meet the Cougar ===
- Solo Date Challenge: First Impressions
- Challenge Winner: Travis
- Eliminated: Kevin, Bodie, Brad, Rich
- Quit: Grant

=== 40 Years Young ===
- Group Date Challenge: Designing Custom Workout Regimens
- Challenge Winners: Adam, Colt, Ryan, Tom, Travis
- Call-Out Order: Adam, Colt, Travis, Ryan
- Eliminated: Tom
- Solo Date Challenge: Giving Stacey a Birthday Gift
- Challenge Winner: Jon
- Eliminated: J.D., Jim

=== Men Vs Boys ===
- Group Date Challenge: Talent Show
- Winners: Adam, Johnny, Austin, David
- Solo Date Challenge: Picking a Dress for Stacey
- Winner: Joe
- Eliminated: Johnny, Kai, and Nick

=== Truth and Consequences ===
- Group Date Challenge: Revealing Secrets
- Winners: Jon, Ryan
- Eliminated: Ryan
- Solo Date Challenge: Composing and Singing a song to Stacey
- Winner: Colt
- Eliminated: Austin, David

=== The Claws Come Out ===
- Group Date Challenge: Kissing Stacey
- Winners: Jimmy
- Eliminated: Jon, Joe

Episode Notes

- ^{3} In Episode 5, Stacey picked Adam and Travis for a date because she felt she was losing them. Adam and Travis did not win the challenge.

=== Meet the Families ===
- Travis' Family: Sister, Mother, Brother
- Jimmy's Family: Mother, Father
- Colt's Family: Brothers
- Adam's Family: Twin Brother (Grant)
- Eliminated: Adam

=== Vegas Nights ===
- Jimmy's Date: Racecar Driving, Dinner, Overnight Stay
- Travis' Date: Massage, Steam Shower, Dinner, Overnight Stay
- Colt's Date: Helicopter Ride, Dinner, Overnight Stay
- Eliminated: Travis

=== The Last Kiss? ===
- Runner Up: Colt
- Winner: Jimmy
