= Jonathan Murray =

American television producer (born 1955)

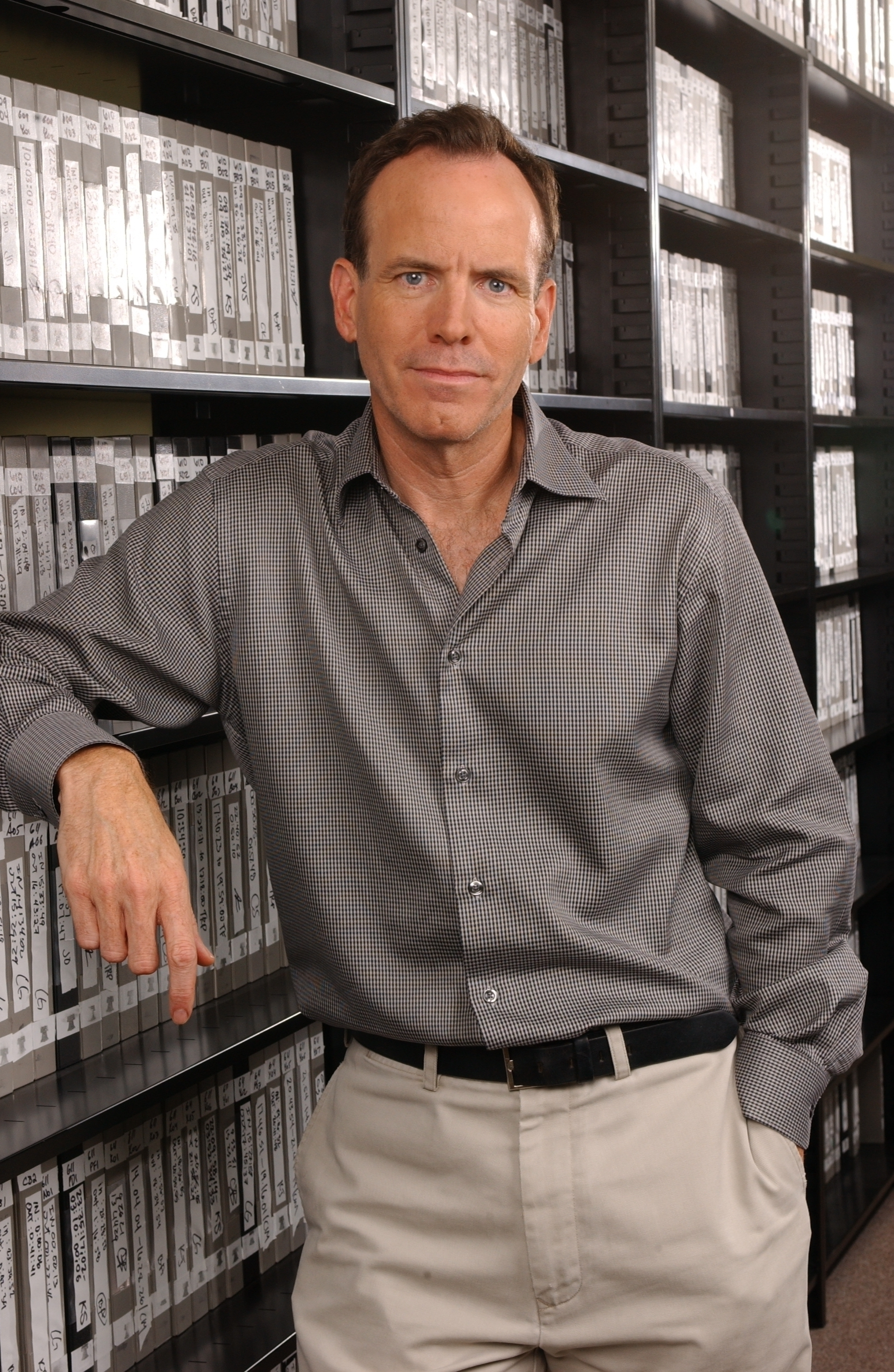
- Jonathan Murray, c. 2000s
- Born: October 26, 1954 (age 72); Gulfport, Mississippi, U.S.
- Other name: Jon Murray
- Occupation: Television producer
- Partner: Harvey Reese
- Children: 1

Jonathan Murray (born October 26, 1955) is an American television producer and co-creator of MTV's The Real World, Road Rules and The Challenge, and the Oxygen Network's Bad Girls Club.

== Early life ==
Murray was born in Gulfport, Mississippi. He grew up in Syracuse, New York, and attended Fayetteville-Manlius High School and is currently in their Hall of Distinction. He attended State University of New York at Geneseo for two years before receiving his bachelor's degree in journalism from the Missouri School of Journalism at the University of Missouri in Columbia, Missouri, in 1977.

== Career ==
In 1987, Murray founded Bunim-Murray with partner Mary-Ellis Bunim. Agent Mark Itkin of the William Morris Agency put the two together to develop a scripted soap opera for MTV. When that was too expensive, they decided to try an unscripted soap and The Real World was born. "We knew within 20 minutes of shooting that we had a show," Bunim said.

Murray and Bunim's company, Bunim/Murray Productions, spearheaded the reality television genre. Among the numerous other reality programs that Murray and Bunim co-created over the years were Road Rules, Love Cruise, Making the Band, The Challenge, the reality feature film The Real Cancun, the real-life daily syndicated Starting Over, as well as Fox's The Simple Life. Bunim/Murray Productions are also executive producers on Project Runway for Lifetime and for Total Divas, Keeping Up with the Kardashians, Kourtney and Khloé Take Miami, Kourtney and Kim Take New York, and Khloé & Lamar, all on E!.

Murray and Bunim were inducted into the Television Academy Hall of Fame in 2012.

== Personal life ==
Murray is openly gay and has been together with his partner, Harvey Reese, since 1992. They adopted a son. Jonathan Murray's son DYLLAN VILLAIN is a photographer.

Murray's niece, Hailey Murray, appeared on the daytime reality series, Starting Over, another show he helped create, during the show's first season, with her mother, Lynnell.
