= The Megan Mullally Show =

- Genre: Talk show
- Presented by: Megan Mullally
- Country of origin: United States
- Original language: English
- No. of episodes: 71

Production
- Running time: 45–48 minutes
- Production companies: Curly One Productions; NBCUniversal Television Distribution

Original release
- Network: Syndication
- Release: September 18, 2006 – January 9, 2007

The Megan Mullally Show is an American talk show hosted by Megan Mullally that debuted in syndication on September 18, 2006, and was canceled in January 2007 due to its low ratings. Early promotions for the program featured Mullally as herself and as her Will & Grace character, Karen Walker. The talk show also aired nationally on TBS and was distributed by NBCUniversal Television Distribution.

Promotional television advertisements featured Mullally standing in front of the title card attempting to correct the voice-over announcer who throughout the commercial mispronounces her name as "Minnie Minnie Moo Moo" and "Monkey McMonkey" among other names.

The first episode featured actor Will Ferrell (who came out to the set wearing nothing but his briefs) and Jenny McCarthy.

== Cancellation ==
On January 4, 2007, NBC Universal, the show's production company, announced that production would cease immediately, and the show aired its final episode six days later. The show, along with Dr. Keith Ablow and The Greg Behrendt Show, were canceled within the first two months of 2007 for low ratings. These shows were three of the four syndicated talk shows to debut in 2006 (Rachael Ray's self-titled talk show was the other). However, unlike what Sony Pictures Television and Warner Bros. did with Behrendt and Ablow's shows, which continued in first run until the end of February and then in reruns until September 2007, NBCUniversal opted to pull The Megan Mullally Show from its stations after January 23, 2007 and offer, in its place, reruns of their lifestyle reality program Starting Over, which had been cancelled at the end of the previous season and replaced in many markets by Mullally's show. Fox News called it "a bit dull and ordinary, and at times seemed very forced" and said viewers were disappointed to find out that Megan is not anything like Karen in real life, a reference to Karen Walker, the character Mullally played on the television sitcom Will & Grace.
