= Mike Fleiss =

American film producer

- Born: April 14, 1964 (age 62)
- Occupations: Producer, writer
- Spouses: Alexandra Vorbeck (m. 1988; div. 2012) Laura Kaeppeler (m. 2014)
- Children: 1

Mike L. Fleiss (born April 14, 1964) is an American television producer and writer.

== Early life ==
Fleiss was raised in Fullerton, California. He attended the University of California, Berkeley.

== Career ==
He was the creator, producer, and writer of The Bachelor, The WB's Superstar USA, The Bachelorette, The Will, and High School Reunion. His first reality TV romance show was Who Wants to Marry a Multi-Millionaire? He was also the producer of the 2003 remake The Texas Chainsaw Massacre and its 2006 prequel The Texas Chainsaw Massacre: The Beginning and the films Hostel (2005), Hostel: Part II (2007), and Hostel: Part III (2011). In 2008, his Next Entertainment production company signed a deal with Warner.

== Personal life ==
His 24-year marriage to his high school sweetheart, Alexandra Vorbeck, ended in 2012.

He married former Miss America, Laura Kaeppeler, in April 2014. The couple's son, Benjamin, was born in May 2015.

In November 2014, Fleiss was criminally charged for harassing Baywatch star David Charvet and Charvet's wife, actress Brooke Burke; the case was eventually dismissed. In July 2019, amidst divorce proceedings, Fleiss' wife Laura Kaeppeler alleged that he assaulted her and "demanded she get an abortion", prompting the Kauai Police Department to begin a criminal investigation. Two weeks later, Kaeppeler dropped the charges and received a settlement. Kaeppeler and Fleiss reconciled several months later and remained married.

== Selected filmography ==
=== Film ===
- The Quest (2003)
- The Texas Chainsaw Massacre (2003)
- Hostel (2005)
- Poseidon (2006)
- The Texas Chainsaw Massacre: The Beginning (2006)
- Hostel: Part II (2007)
- Hostel: Part III (2011)

=== Television ===
- Hollywood Stuntmakers (3 episodes, 1992–99)
- Who Wants to Marry a Multi-Millionaire? (2000)
- The Bachelor (2002–2023)
- The Bachelorette (2003–2023)
- High School Reunion (2003–2005, 2008–2010)
- The WB's Superstar USA (2004)
- The Will (2005)
- The Starlet (2005)
- The Two-Timer (2005)
- Hitched or Ditched (2009)
- The Cougar (2009)
- More to Love (2009)
- There Goes the Neighborhood (2009)
- Bachelor Pad (2010–2012)
- Bachelor in Paradise (2014–2023)
- Love at First Kiss (2016)
- The Proposal (2018)
- The Bachelor Winter Games (2018)
