= Bunim/Murray =

American entertainment production company

Bunim/Murray Productions
- Logo used since 2021
- Type: Subsidiary
- Industry: Entertainment
- Founded: 1987; 39 years ago
- Founders: Mary-Ellis Bunim; Jonathan Murray
- Headquarters: Glendale, California, United States
- Area served: Worldwide
- Key people: Julie Pizzi (president and CEO); Jonathan Murray (founder and executive consultant)
- Owner: Banijay Entertainment (2010–2026; 2026–present)
- Parent: Banijay Americas
- Website: bmp51.com

Bunim/Murray Productions is an American entertainment production company based out of Glendale, California and owned by Banijay Entertainment since 25 March 2010. Considered as a pioneer in the reality television genre with local hit programs like The Real World, Road Rules and Bad Girls Club, it was founded in 1987 by Mary-Ellis Bunim and Jonathan Murray after an agent named Mark Itkin of the William Morris Agency put the two together to develop a scripted soap opera for MTV. When that was too expensive, they decided to try an unscripted soap and The Real World was born. "We knew within 20 minutes of shooting that we had a show," Bunim said. The company has expanded into music management, managing the pop punk/emo band A Cursive Memory.

The company's initial success was on the creation of The Real World. Attempts at scripted series, including Jam Bay, a show that would have co-produced with Universal Television for ABC, never went past the pilot stage. On June 28, 1999, the company attempted to enter into the syndication business, by planning on to partner with Columbia TriStar Television Distribution to launch a reality strip Love Hurts. In 2001, Bunim/Murray partnered with Artists Television Group, on the unaired WB television show Lost in the USA, but it was cancelled and it was hit with a $1 million lawsuit. On December 16, 2002, the company announced that they would partner with film studio New Line Cinema on the company's only theatrical project, The Real Cancun.

== Current television shows ==
- The Challenge
- The Challenge: All Stars
- Don't Forget the Lyrics!
- Family or Fiance
- Lizzo's Watch Out for the Big Grrrls
- The Never Ever Mets
- Project Runway
- Vanderpump Villa

== Past television shows ==
- #SOS stylist on set
- After Happily Ever After
- Allure Incubator
- American Families
- America's Psychic Challenge
- Bad Girls Club
- Bad Girls All-Star Battle
- Bad Girls Road Trip
- Ball in the Family
- Best Ink
- Born for Business
- Born This Way
- Born to Diva
- BRKDWN
- Buddy Games
- Chachi's World
- The Challenge Argentina: El Desafío
- The Challenge: Australia
- The Challenge: Champs vs. Pros
- The Challenge: Champs vs. Stars
- The Challenge UK
- The Challenge: USA
- The Challenge: World Championship
- Citizen Rose
- Collab Crib
- The Crystal Maze
- Dash Dolls
- Deaf Out Loud
- Disney TRYathlon
- Dr. Steve-O
- Earth Live
- El Mundo Real
- Emily's Wonder Lab
- Endless Summer
- The Family Stallone
- For Real: The Story of Reality TV
- The Gary Owen Show
- Girl Next Door
- GloBugz!
- Growing up is a Drag
- Happy Wheels: The Series
- The Healer
- House of Creators
- Howard Stern
- I Am Cait
- I Survived Bear Grylls
- Iyanla: Fix My Life
- Keeping Up with the Kardashians
- Khloé & Lamar
- Kourtney and Kim Take Miami
- Kourtney and Kim Take New York
- Kourtney and Khloé Take The Hamptons
- L'Oreal Paris Academy
- Life of a Fitness Pop Star
- Life of Kylie
- Like Mother, Like Daughter?
- Lindsay Lohan's Beach Club
- Living Lohan
- Lookbook
- Love Cruise
- Love Games: Bad Girls Need Love Too
- Love Thy Sister
- Making the Band
- Mariah's World
- Married to Rock
- Match Made in Heaven
- Models of the Runway
- Motor City Masters
- Miz & Mrs.
- Mrs. Eastwood & Company
- Murder
- Old Skool with Terry and Gita
- On Edge
- One Ocean View
- Project Runway All Stars
- The Real World
- The Real World Homecoming
- The Rebel Billionaire
- Reunited: The Real World Las Vegas
- Road Rules
- Road Trippin'
- Rob & Chyna
- Saddle Ranch
- The Scholar
- The Selection
- The Simple Life
- Ski Patrol
- So Cosmo
- The Spin Crowd
- Starting Over
- Stewarts & Hamiltons
- Stranded with Sam and Colby
- Styl'd
- Supreme Court of Comedy
- Surviving R. Kelly
- Sway Life
- Total Bellas
- Total Divas
- Twinning Out
- Under the Gunn
- Undressed
- Valerie's Home Cooking
- Wildlife Rescue Rangers
- WWE Evil
- WWE Legends' House

== Films and documentaries ==
- Autism: The Musical
- Camp Steve-O
- Kim Kardashian West: The Justice Project
- The Life and Murder of Nicole Brown Simpson
- Pedro
- Personally Yours
- The Real Cancun
- The Real World Movie: The Lost Season
- The Real World Presents: Return to Duty
- Shadow Billionaire
- They Call Us Monsters
- Transhood
- Valentine Road
- Wealth Hunters

== Sexual assault controversy ==
In October 2011, two years after Real World/Road Rules Challenge: The Ruins aired, contestant Tonya Cooley filed a lawsuit against fellow contestants Kenny Santucci and Evan Starkman, MTV, and Bunim/Murray Productions, claiming that she was sexually assaulted during filming. Cooley claimed in the lawsuit that Santucci and Starkman inserted a toothbrush into her vaginal canal while she was passed out from heavy drinking, and stated that she was subjected to an environment in which degrading and harassing behavior was directed at female contestants, including bathing suits stripped off their bodies. A representative for Bunim/Murray said that "after a thorough investigation, we have found Tonya Cooley’s claims to be completely baseless." Cooley also alleged that the show's producers encouraged and rewarded such behavior, and that when she raised concerns she was told to "just deal with it." A representative for Viacom blamed Cooley for the alleged assault against her, stating in court that "in addition to failing to avail herself of VMN's policies and complaint procedures, Plaintiff failed to avoid the injuries of which she complains. For example, while she was a contestant on The Ruins, Plaintiff was frequently intoxicated (to an extent far greater than other contestants), rowdy, combative, flirtatious and on multiple occasions intentionally exposed her bare breasts and genitalia to other contestants." The lawsuit was settled out of court one year later.
