= The Real Cancun =

- Theatrical release poster
- Directed by: Rick de Oliveira
- Written by: Brian Caldirola
- Produced by: Mary-Ellis Bunim; Jonathan Murray
- Starring: see below
- Edited by: James Gavin Bedford; Joe Shugart; Eric Spagnoletti; Dave Stanke; Dan Zimmerman
- Music by: Michael Suby
- Production companies: FilmEngine; Bunim/Murray Productions
- Distributed by: New Line Cinema
- Release date: April 25, 2003
- Running time: 96 minutes
- Country: United States
- Language: English
- Budget: $7.5 million
- Box office: $5.3 million

The Real Cancun is a 2003 American reality film directed by Rick de Oliveira and written by Brian Caldirola. Inspired by the reality television genre, this film followed the lives of sixteen Americans from March 13 to 23, 2003 as they celebrated spring break in Cancún, Mexico's Hotel Zone and experienced romantic relationships, emotional strife, or just had a good time.

The film received negative critical reviews and was a box office flop, earning a little over $5 million in the United States from a $7.5 million budget. It was the film debut of Laura Ramsey.

== Cast ==
- Benjamin "Fletch" Fletcher
- Nicole Frilot
- Roxanne Frilot
- David Ingber
- Jeremy Jazwinski
- Amber Madison
- Paul Malbry
- Marquita "Skye" Marshall aka Skye P Marshall
- Laura Ramsey
- Matthew Slenske
- Alan Taylor
- Heidi Vance
- Casey Weeks
- Sarah Wilkins
- Jorell Washington
- Adam Miller
- Grant George as Miscellaneous voices
- Hot Action Cop
- Simple Plan
- Snoop Dogg

== Production ==
In December 2002, it was reported New Line Cinema had greenlit reality film The Real Spring Break from producers Mary-Ellis Bunim and Jonathan Murray who'd created The Real World New Line Executive VP, Richard Brener, cited the success of Jackass: The Movie as a key motivation for pursuing the project believing that the built-in audience from The Real World would be interested in seeing a similar format free of TV censorship. Filming was set to take place in March 2003 in Cancún, Mexico for a release during Summer 2003 with the intention of beating out a similar reality themed project at Universal Pictures utilizing the same location. In order to fill out the 12 cast members, Washington State University, University of Arizona, and University of Oklahoma were among the college campuses scouted for potential cast members.

== Release ==
The Real Cancun was released theatrically only a month after filming was completed, and was released on DVD and home video only a couple of months after that.

=== Box office ===
The film earned $2,108,796 in its opening weekend from 2,261 venues, ranking tenth in the North American box office and fourth among the week's new releases. It closed a month later, having grossed $3,825,421 domestically and $1,519,662 overseas for a worldwide total of $5,345,083, coming well short of its $7.5 million production cost.

=== Critical response ===
The Real Cancun received generally negative reviews from critics (with Variety's Scott Foundas causing to remark in his review that The Real Cancun billed itself as "the first reality feature film" is "apparently ignoring last year's Jackass: The Movie"). On review aggregator website Rotten Tomatoes, the film holds a 34% score based on 91 reviews, with an average rating of 4.2/10. The site's consensus states: "The footage is predictable and rather tame, and most of the people are uninteresting." Metacritic reports a 34 out of 100 rating based on 24 critics, indicating "generally unfavorable reviews". Audiences polled by CinemaScore gave the film an average grade of "C−" on an A+ to F scale.

=== Awards and nominations ===
The film was nominated for Worst Picture and Worst Excuse for an Actual Movie (All Concept/No Content) at the 24th Golden Raspberry Awards. It lost both awards to Gigli for the former and The Cat in the Hat for the latter.

== Thematic analysis ==
Carol Siegel, a professor of English and American Studies at Washington State University Vancouver, interpreted The Real Cancun as about society's expectations of juveniles' sexual behaviors; despite visuals such as near nudity and simulations of the act, the characters try to present themselves as being abstinent and not "slut"-ty, and only two couples make love by the end.

== Aftermath ==
A reality movie based upon the Girls Gone Wild video series that MGM bought the rights to was never put into production, while the Universal Pictures effort Drunken Jackasses: The Quest was delayed after the flop of Cancun and ultimately went straight to video.
