= Brian McFayden =

American television personality (born 1976)

- Born: October 1, 1976 (age 48); Omaha, Nebraska, U.S.
- Occupation: Television personality
- Years active: 2000–present

Brian McFayden (born October 1, 1976) is an American television personality. He has worked as an MTV News anchor and an MTV VJ. He worked at KGW, the NBC affiliate station in Portland, Oregon, from December 2016 to October 2017.

== Biography ==
McFayden was born in Omaha, Nebraska. He first became known as an MTV News anchor, before transitioning into a MTV VJ, and occasional host for TRL and other shows. McFayden hosted Cupid on CBS and the host of the first season of The CW's Beauty and the Geek (when it was on The WB). He also worked with popular radio disc jockey, Cane for several years on KEGE 93.7 The Edge in Minneapolis and for 92.3 K-Rock Radio in New York City.

McFayden hosted and produced for Al Gore's Current TV. In May 2011, McFayden began hosting 7 Wonders of the Wall on MSN.

In August 2012, McFayden was signed by Silver Chalice Ventures, based out of Chicago, Illinois, to host "Campus Insiders", an online, digital NCAA college football and basketball show.

As of March 2014, he was a reporter/anchor for HLN Morning Express Bleacher Report.

In December 2016, he began working as a morning news anchor and co-host of Portland Today for KGW in Portland, Oregon.

In January 2017, McFayden was removed from the morning programs and placed on KGW's Live At 7 evening news program as the host. In October 2017, he left KGW, or at least its news division, for unknown reasons.

In December 2020, McFayden began working at KYGO FM 98.5 in Denver, CO. In March 2021 he left the station

== Filmography ==
=== Film ===
- Die Trying (2010) – Himself

=== Television ===
- KGW Live At 7 (January 2017 – October 2017) – Host
- KGW Sunrise (December 2016 – January 2017) – Morning Anchor
- Portland Today (December 2016 – January 2017) – Co-host
- Headline News Bleacher Report (2014–2015) – Sports Reporter/Anchor
- 7 Wonders of the Wall (2011–present) – Host MSN
- KTLA Morning Show (2010) – Anchor CW
- It's a Knockout! (2009 pilot) – Host NBC
- Fake or Real (2009–present) – Host E!
- Current TV (2007–2009) – Host/Producer Current TV
- Campus Ladies (2006) – Oxygen
- Beauty and the Geek (2005) – Host WB
- Grounded for Life (2005) – Greg WB
- The WB's Superstar USA (2004) – Host WB
- Cupid (2003) – Host CBS
- The Real World: Chicago – Stop Being Polite: Reunion (2002) – Host MTV
- Dawson's Creek (2002) – Male VJ WB
- TRL Presents: VJ for a Day (2001) – Host
- MADtv (2001) – Himself FOX
- Miss Teen USA (2000–2001) – Host CBS
- Sabrina, the Teenage Witch (2001) – Destiny
- Total Request Live (2000–2003) – VJ MTV
