= Reality film =

Genre of documentary film

Reality film or reality movie describes a genre of films that have resulted from reality television.

== Criteria ==
Titles such as The Real Cancun, MTV's film version of The Real World (which was originally titled Spring Break: The Reality Movie), are examples of the genre. In an article in Time Magazine, Joel Stein wrote, "Like reality TV, a reality film is supercheap, and as Jackass proved, there's an audience willing to pay $9 for what it gets free on television." Typically, a pre-determined situation is staged or created, often with the use of non-professional actors, and then the "reality" of what happens is filmed. In an article on reality movies, Variety pointed out the low budget of reality films in an era of skyrocketing marketing and production costs for traditional films has made them an attractive option for studios, with the selling point being "Tits and ass. Teenage tits and ass, that is."

== History of reality film ==
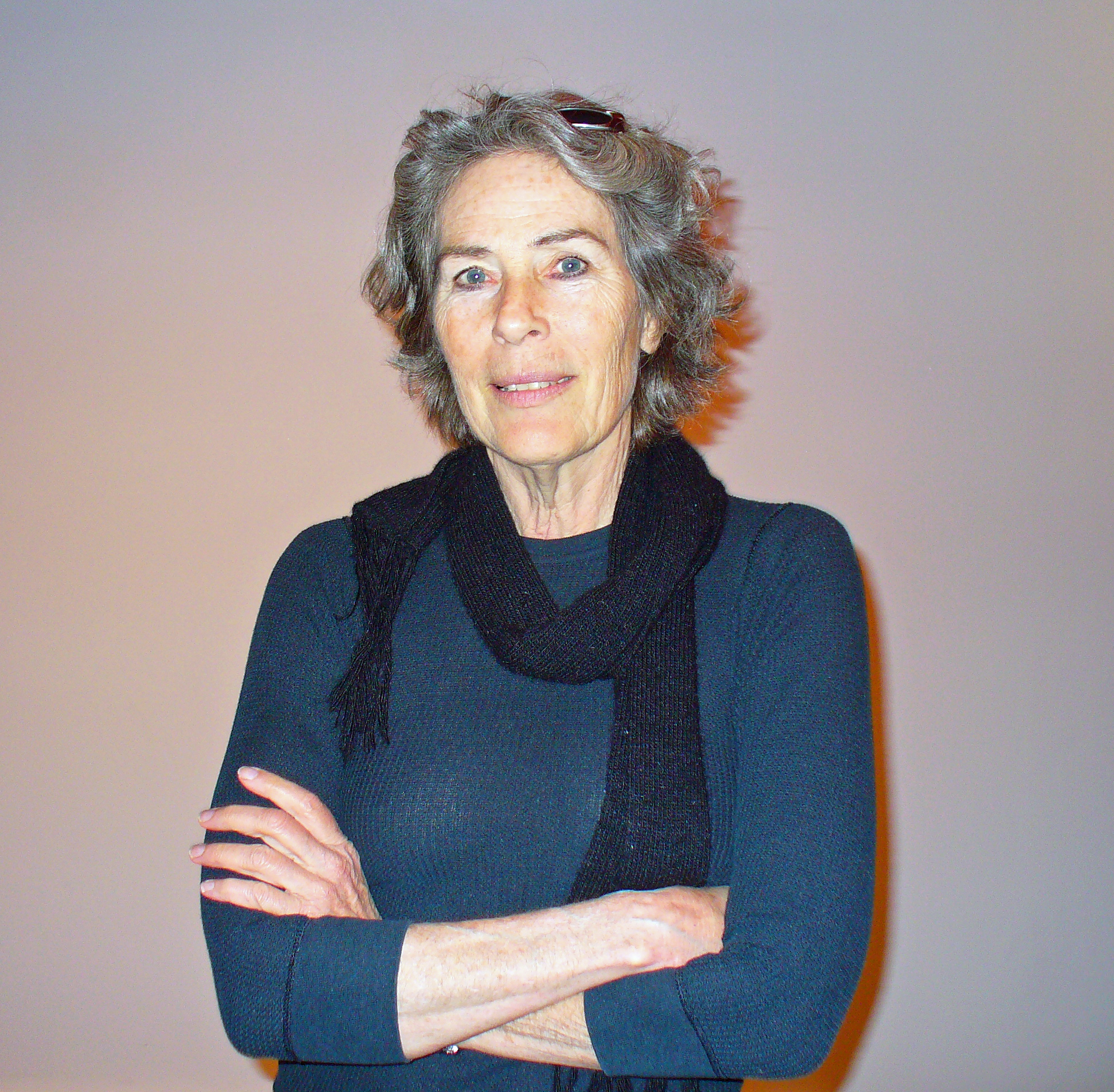
Mary Woronov, star of Chelsea Girls: "I was the only one who memorised my lines, and no one even noticed."

"The thinking behind these pics is not new," wrote Gabriel Snyder in Variety about the techniques employed by recent reality movies. In the 1950s, Samuel Arkoff tapped into teen auds with quickies like Rock All Night and Reform School Girl and beach films such as Bikini Beach ("It's where every torso is more so, and bare-as-you-dare is the rule!"). London's Evening Standard called Andy Warhol's 1966 film Chelsea Girls a reality film and noted that the Radio Times Guide to Film 2007 stated it was "to blame for reality television." The film consists of drugged-out conversations between Warhol Superstars Nico, Ondine, Brigid Berlin, Mary Woronov, and Gerard Malanga. "I was the only one who memorised my lines," said Woronov, "and no one even noticed." In 1970, Candid Camera creator Allen Funt made the film What Do You Say to a Naked Lady?, where he secretly filmed people's reactions to unexpected encounters with nudity in unusual situations. However, it was with the advent of reality television, which presents purportedly unscripted dramatic or humorous situations, documents actual events, and features ordinary people instead of professional actors, combined with the smash box-office success of Jackass: The Movie in 2002, that made reality film a genre studios began to consider seriously. The Real Cancun billed itself as "the first reality feature film", causing Scott Foundas to remark in his review in Variety that such a claim is "apparently ignoring last year's Jackass The Movie". In 2003, Comedy Central aired its feature length reality movie Windy City Heat, starring Tony Barbieri and Bobcat Goldthwaite (who also directed). In the movie, friends of real life aspiring actor Perry Caravello convince him he is playing the lead (as a "sports memorabilia private eye") of an action movie titled "Windy City Heat," itself faux-directed by Bobcat Goldthwait; everyone is in on the elaborate joke except Caravello.

== Reality films as documentaries ==
Some reality films, such as those based upon the Jackass television series, have been called documentaries. Jan Krawitz, director of Stanford University's prestigious master of arts program in documentary film and video, teaches not to make a reality film if you want your documentary to be real. In his article in Time, Stein raises the point that "If the movie is shot like a documentary, we're willing to pretend it's a documentary no matter how staged it is.... And unlike documentarians, the [Real Cancun] producers, who have to work with MTV in their day jobs, felt it prudent to edit out the more controversial scenes, such as the one in which the twins have an angry, cursing fight with rapper Snoop Dogg in his post-concert trailer after, they say, he tried to get amorous with them." Correy Herrick raises a similar point about Cancun in Hybrid Magazine:

This is by no means a documentary. Everything that happens is real, but you are only seeing what the producers want you to see, in the order they want you to see it, with the music they want you to hear. And they go even further here by splicing in non-reality cuts from time to time to accentuate the plot a little further. They need to turn these normal people into characters in order to achieve an entertaining experience and they are very crafty in the ways they do this.

James Ronald Whitney, whose films have won multiple "Best Documentary" awards, distinguishes between documentary and reality film. In an interview about his reality film Games People Play: New York, he said the difference was filming a staged scenario versus filming actual events that would have happened regardless of the camera's presence:

"A documentary is reality, but is its own animal. It's when you go back in time and you do a film about an election, an Olympics, a war, or something in the future that would organically happen anyway. Even Real Cancun, spring break was going to happen. Spellbound's spelling bee was still going to happen. Those are not events that were created by a writer who then decided, "I'm going to make a movie about this event that I have created." That's how this is different to me than a documentary.

== Issues facing reality film ==
The viability of reality films has been called into question. The Real Cancun was considered a flop at the box office, taking in $5,345,083 worldwide on a budget of $7.5 million. A reality movie based upon the Girls Gone Wild video series that MGM bought the rights to was never put into production and the Universal Pictures effort Drunken Jackasses: The Quest was delayed after the flop of Cancun and went straight to video. In an interview with the Christian Science Monitor, Robert Thompson, founding director of the Bleier Center for Television and Popular Culture at Syracuse University, acknowledged the potential "for an entirely new form of filmmaking." However, noted Thompson, "people aren't watching Survivor just to see people in bikinis," and added that standard reality television techniques such as serialized suspense, "voting off" segments, and general goofiness should not be included in the films. One of the criticisms was that reality television allows viewers to get to know new people over time. With a reality film such as Cancun, "They transposed the format from television but none of the original characters," writes Sean Macauly in The Times. "With a film, viewers have 90 minutes to get up to speed with a cast of 16 partygoers. Rather than structuring their exploits like a soap opera and following them for a summer, The Real Cancun follows them for eight days." Paramount Pictures President Gail Berman stated that Jackass is "a great centerpiece for reality going to film" when asked about reality movies, but stated the question going forward is, "How do you get the exhibition experience of a movie to feel immediate and interactive with the audience?"

== Other uses of the phrase 'reality film' ==
The phrase "reality film" has been used in the titles of articles that discuss the popularity of documentaries after the advent of "reality TV."

== See also ==
- Cinema verite
- Actuality film
- Dirty Sanchez
- Realism (arts)
- Direct Cinema
