= Stan Katz (psychologist) =

American psychologist

Dr Stan J Katz is an American clinical and forensic psychologist. A critic of the codependency movement, Katz co-authored The Codependency Conspiracy: How to Break the Recovery Habit and Take Charge of Your Life (New York: Warner Books, Inc., 1991). Katz proposes that many pop-psychology movements (especially codependency) are rooted in marketing campaigns and not valid science or psychology. He is also the co-author of "False Love and Other Romantic Illusions (New York: Ticknor and Fields, 1988) and "Success Trap" (New York: Ticknor and Fields, 1990). As a Forensic Psychologist he has been appointed over one thousand times by the Los Angeles Superior Court to conduct expert examinations in Family Law, Dependency and Criminal Courts. He was involved in the Michael Jackson Child Molestation case in Santa Barbara County, California.

Dr. Katz has appeared on numerous television and radio programs including The Today Show, Larry King, Oprah, 20/20, Bad Girls Club and was featured in People Magazine. He was also the consulting psychologist on the reality TV series Starting Over for which he won an Emmy for his work as Co-host.

== See also ==
- Michael Jackson
