= Reality television =

Genre of television programming

Reality television is a genre of television programming that documents purportedly unscripted real-life situations, often starring ordinary people instead of professional actors. Reality television emerged as a distinct genre in the early 1990s with shows such as The Real World, then achieved prominence in the early 2000s with the success of the series Survivor, Idol, and Big Brother, all of which became global franchises. Reality television shows tend to be interspersed with "confessionals", short interview segments in which cast members reflect on or provide context for the events being depicted on-screen; this is most commonly seen in American reality television. Competition-based reality shows typically feature the gradual elimination of participants, either by a panel of judges, by the viewership of the show, or by the contestants themselves.

Documentaries, factual television, television news, sports television, talk shows, and traditional game shows are generally not classified as reality television. Some genres of television programming that predate the reality television boom have been retroactively classified as reality television, including hidden camera shows, talent-search shows, documentary series about ordinary people, high-concept game shows, home improvement shows, and court shows featuring real-life cases.

Reality television has faced significant criticism since its rise in popularity. Critics argue that by placing the participants in artificial situations, coaching them on behavior, generating storylines ahead of time, staging the scenes and editing footage in misleading ways, reality television shows do not accurately reflect reality. Some shows have been accused of rigging the favorite or underdog to win. Other criticisms of reality television shows include that they humiliate or exploit participants; that they make stars out of either untalented people or infamous figures or both; and that they glamorize vulgarity. This has been a recurring pattern in the reality TV world, especially when it comes to normalizing cruelty and violence. Reality TV has been known to favor disruptive behavior because it enhances the drama and entertainment factor of the show. This pattern often leaves cast members with many mental health issues, and personal self-esteem problems.

== History ==
Television formats portraying ordinary people in unscripted situations are almost as old as the television medium itself. Producer-host Allen Funt's Candid Camera, in which unsuspecting people were confronted with funny, unusual situations and filmed with hidden cameras, first aired in 1948. In the 21st century, the series is often considered a prototype of reality television programming.

=== 1940s–1950s ===
In the early 1940s the German television station Fernsehsender Paul Nipkow had staged a show in which a young couple acted as model Aryans and presented their everyday lives without a script to the camera (Familienchroniken – Ein Abend mit Hans und Gelli). Even though it was clearly Nazi propaganda and the episodes were certainly affected by censorship, in recent years the show has been presented more frequently as the oldest reality TV show in the world.

Precedents for television that portrayed people in unscripted situations began in the late 1940s. Queen for a Day (1945–1964) was an early example of reality-based television. The 1946 television game show Cash and Carry sometimes featured contestants performing stunts. Debuting in 1948, Allen Funt's hidden camera show Candid Camera (based on his previous 1947 radio show, The Candid Microphone) broadcast unsuspecting ordinary people reacting to pranks. In 1948, talent search shows, such as Ted Mack's Original Amateur Hour and Arthur Godfrey's Talent Scouts, featured amateur competitors and audience voting. In the 1950s, game shows Beat the Clock and Truth or Consequences involved contestants in wacky competitions, stunts, and practical jokes. Confession was a crime and police show that aired from June 1958 to January 1959, with interviewer Jack Wyatt questioning criminals from assorted backgrounds. The radio series Nightwatch (1951–1955) tape-recorded the daily activities of Culver City, California police officers. The series You Asked for It (1950–1959) incorporated audience involvement by basing episodes around requests sent in by postcard from viewers.

=== 1960s–1970s ===
First broadcast in the United Kingdom in 1964, the Granada Television documentary Seven Up! broadcast interviews with 14 ordinary 7-year-olds from a broad cross-section of society and inquired about their reactions to everyday life. Every seven years, the filmmaker Michael Apted created a new film documenting the lives of the same individuals during the intervening period. Titled the Up Series, episodes included "7 Plus Seven", "21 Up", etc.; it is still ongoing. Structured as a series of candid interviews with no scripted plot, the films chronicle how the participants navigated personal milestones such as education, career, marriage, and family. Over time, by virtue of the sustained public attention, the participants became notable figures in British culture, effectively turning ordinary people into a type of celebrity.

The series The American Sportsman, which ran from 1965 to 1986 on ABC in the United States, would typically feature one or more celebrities, and sometimes their family members, being accompanied by a camera crew on an outdoor adventure, such as hunting, fishing, hiking, scuba diving, rock climbing, wildlife photography, horseback riding, race car driving, and the like, with most of the resulting action and dialogue being unscripted, except for the narration.

In the 1966 Direct Cinema film Chelsea Girls, Andy Warhol filmed various acquaintances with no direction given. The Radio Times Guide to Film 2007 said that the film was "to blame for reality television".

In 1969, the British rock group the Beatles were filmed for a month during the recording sessions which would become their album Let It Be and released the homonymous film the following year. In 2021, director Peter Jackson created an eight-hour, three-episode television series entitled The Beatles: Get Back.

In 1970

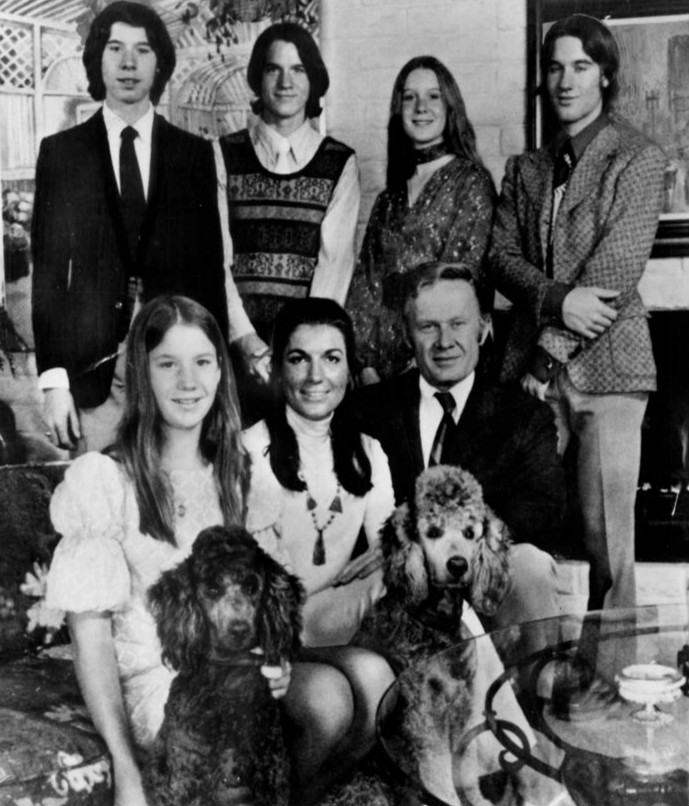
The Loud family, subjects of the pioneering PBS series An American Family. During filming, the parents decided to divorce and son Lance (top right) came out as gay.

The 12-part 1973 PBS series An American Family showed a nuclear family (filmed in 1971) going through a divorce; unlike many later reality shows, it was more or less documentary in purpose and style. In 1974 a counterpart program, The Family, was made in the UK, following the working-class Wilkins family of Reading. Other forerunners of modern reality television were the 1970s productions of Chuck Barris: The Dating Game, The Newlywed Game, and The Gong Show, all of which featured participants who were eager to sacrifice some of their privacy and dignity in a televised competition.

The German television documentary TV series, Filmbriefe ("Film Letters",) directed by Pierre Hoffmann, was filmed over a one-year span from October 1976 to September 1977, and was aired in Germany in January 13, 1976. The show tracked the daily routines and experiences of 13 children and teenagers living in three distinct cities in the world: Munich (Germany), Rio de Janeiro (Brazil), and Shiraz (Iran). The central premise involved the young participants creating and exchanging "video letters" to give one another a glimpse into their personal everyday lives. While the creators originally planned to feature teenagers from China as well, the Chinese government rejected the proposal at the time, explaining that the nation's political environment was not yet appropriate for the project.

The 1976–1980 BBC series The Big Time featured a different amateur in some field (cooking, comedy, football, etc.) trying to succeed professionally in that field, with help from notable experts. The 15-episode series is credited with starting the career of Sheena Easton, who was selected to appear in the episode showing an aspiring pop singer trying to enter the music business.

In 1978, Living in the Past had amateurs participating in a re-enactment of life in an Iron Age English village.

=== 1980s–1990s ===
Producer George Schlatter capitalized on the advent of videotape to create Real People, a surprise hit for NBC, and it ran from 1979 to 1984. The success of Real People was quickly copied by the television company ABC with That's Incredible, a stunt show produced by Alan Landsburg and co-hosted by Fran Tarkenton; CBS's entry into the genre was That's My Line, a series hosted by Bob Barker. The Canadian series Thrill of a Lifetime, a fantasies-fulfilled reality show, originally ran from 1982 to 1988. It was revived from 2001 to 2003. In 1985, underwater cinematographer Al Giddings teamed with former Miss Universe Shawn Weatherly on the NBC series Oceanquest, which chronicled Weatherly's adventures scuba diving in various exotic locales. Weatherly was nominated for an Emmy Award for Outstanding Achievement in informational programming. COPS, which first aired in the spring of 1989 on Fox and was developed due to the need for new programming during the 1988 Writers Guild of America strike, showed police officers on duty apprehending criminals. It introduced the camcorder look and cinéma vérité feel of much of later reality television. The 1991 television documentary on "typical American high schoolers", Yearbook, focused on seniors attending Glenbard West High School, in Glen Ellyn, Illinois and broadcast prime-time on Fox.

The series Nummer 28, which aired on Dutch television in 1991, originated the concept of putting strangers together in a limited environment for an extended period of time and recording the drama that ensued. Nummer 28 also pioneered many of the stylistic conventions that have since become standard in reality television shows, including extensive use of soundtrack music and the interspersing of events on screen with after-the-fact "confessionals" recorded by cast members, which serve as narration. Nummer 28 became the model for many later series of Big Brother and its clones, and Peter Weir's full-length film The Truman Show. One year later, the same concept was used by MTV in its new series The Real World. Nummer 28 creator Erik Latour has long claimed that The Real World was directly inspired by his show. But the producers of The Real World have said that their direct inspiration was An American Family. According to television commentator Charlie Brooker, this type of reality television was enabled by the advent of computer-based non-linear editing systems for video (such as produced by Avid Technology) in 1989. These systems made it easy to quickly edit hours of video footage into a usable form, something that had been very difficult to do before (film, which was easy to edit, was too expensive to use in shooting enough hours on a regular basis).

Sylvania Waters (1992) was an Australian show that depicted a family, similar in concept to An American Family.

The 1994–95 O. J. Simpson murder case, during which live network television followed suspect Simpson for 90 minutes being chased by police, has been described as a seminal moment in reality television. Networks interrupted their regular television programming for months for coverage of the trial and related events. Because of Simpson's status as a top athlete and celebrity, the brutal nature of the murders, and issues of race and class in Los Angeles celebrity culture, the sensational case dominated ratings and the public conversation.

Many reality television stars of the 2000s and 2010s have direct or indirect connections to people involved in the case, most notably Kim Kardashian, daughter of defense attorney Robert Kardashian, and several of her relatives and associates.

The series Expedition Robinson, created by television producer Charlie Parsons, which first aired in 1997 in Sweden (and was later produced in a large number of other countries as Survivor), added to the Nummer 28/Real World template the idea of competition and elimination. Cast members or contestants battled against each other and were removed from the show until only one winner remained (these shows are now sometimes called elimination shows). Changing Rooms, a program that began in the UK in 1996, showed couples redecorating each other's houses, and was the first reality show with a self-improvement or makeover theme. The dating reality show Streetmate premiered in the UK in 1998. Originally created by Gabe Sachs as Street Match, it was a flop in the United States. But the show was revamped in the UK by Tiger Aspect Productions and became a cult hit. The production team from the original series later created the popular reality shows Strictly Come Dancing, Location, Location, Location, and the revamped MasterChef, among others. The 1980s and 1990s were also a time when tabloid talk shows became more popular. Many of these featured the same types of unusual or dysfunctional guests who would later become popular as cast members of reality shows.

=== 2000s ===
Reality television became globally popular at the turn of the century. Survivor/Expedition Robinson debuted in Sweden in 1997, while Big Brother debuted in the Netherlands in 1999. The American version of Survivor began airing in 2000 becoming a major success. The Big Brother franchise especially became a major success and is credited for "changing" television and celebrity status. The franchise expanded from the Netherlands to many other countries in the year 2000, and that same year Endemol (the Dutch TV company behind Big Brother) was purchased by Spanish corporation Telefónica for what was considered a large sum.

In the United States, reality television programs suffered a temporary decline in viewership, especially following the September 11 terrorist attacks, leading some entertainment industry columnists to speculate that the genre was a temporary fad that had run its course. Reality shows that suffered from low ratings included The Amazing Race (although the show has since recovered and is in its 37th edition), Lost (unrelated to the better-known serial drama of the same name) and The Mole (which was successful in other countries). But stronghold show Survivor remained resilient, leading the ratings in 2001–02. On the other hand, American Idol, which debuted in 2002, would go on to top the U.S. season-average television ratings in the 2000s. Idol has the longest hold on the No. 1 rank in the American television ratings, dominating over all other primetime programs and other television series in the overall viewership tallies for eight consecutive years, from the 2003–2004 to the 2010–2011 television seasons.

Another trend was to combine reality TV with a social history angle usually by having contestants taken back to various time periods primarily to see how millennials would cope without modern technology. Examples included The 1900 House, Bad Lads' Army and That'll Teach 'Em. In addition to those was a series consisting of archeologists and historians running a farm though various historical periods, most notably Victorian Farm.

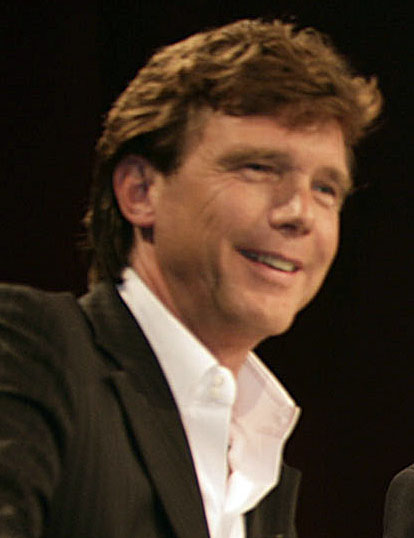
Dutch media tycoon John de Mol Jr., who created the reality television franchises Big Brother, Fear Factor and The Voice, among others

Internationally, a number of shows created in the late 1990s and 2000s have had massive global success. Reality-television franchises created during that time that have had more than 30 international adaptations each include the singing competition franchises Idols, Star Academy and The X Factor, other competition franchises Survivor/Expedition Robinson, Big Brother, The Biggest Loser, Come Dine with Me, Got Talent, Top Model, MasterChef, Project Runway and Dancing with the Stars, and the investment franchise Dragons' Den. Several "reality game shows" from the same period have had even greater success, including Deal or No Deal, Who Wants to Be a Millionaire?, and Weakest Link, with over 50 international adaptions each. (All but four of these franchises, Top Model, Project Runway, The Biggest Loser and Dragons' Den, were created by either British producers or the Dutch production company Endemol. Although Dragons' Den originated in Japan, most of its adaptations are based on the British version.) In India, the competition show Indian Idol was the most popular television program for its first six seasons.

During the 2000s, several cable networks, including Bravo, A&E, E!, TLC, History, VH1, and MTV, changed their programming to feature mostly reality television series. The Osbournes is considered to be a pioneering reality television show which ushered in an era of series focusing on celebrity family life. In addition, three cable channels were started around that time that were devoted exclusively to reality television: Fox Reality in the United States, which operated from 2005 to 2010; Global Reality Channel in Canada, which lasted two years from 2010 to 2012; and CBS Reality (formerly known as Reality TV and then Zone Reality) in Europe, the Middle East and Africa, which has run from 1999 to the present.

During the early part of the 2000s, network executives expressed concern that reality-television programming was limited in its appeal for DVD reissue and syndication. But DVDs for reality shows sold briskly; Laguna Beach: The Real Orange County, The Amazing Race, Project Runway, and America's Next Top Model all ranked in the top DVDs sold on Amazon.com. In the mid-2000s, DVDs of The Simple Life outranked scripted shows such as The O.C. and Desperate Housewives. Syndication, however, has been problematic; shows such as Fear Factor, COPS, and Wife Swap, in which each episode is self-contained, can be rerun fairly easily, but usually only on cable television or during the daytime (COPS and America's Funniest Home Videos being exceptions). Season-long competitions, such as The Amazing Race, Survivor, and America's Next Top Model generally perform more poorly and usually must be rerun in marathons to draw the necessary viewers to make it worthwhile. (Even in these cases, it is not always successful: the first ten seasons of Dancing with the Stars were picked up by GSN in 2012 and was run in marathon format, but attracted low viewership and had very poor ratings). Another option is to create documentaries around series, including extended interviews with the participants and outtakes not seen in the original airings; the syndicated series American Idol Rewind is an example of this strategy.

COPS has had huge success in syndication, direct response sales, and DVD. A Fox staple since 1989, COPS has, as of 2013 (when it moved to cable channel Spike), outlasted all competing scripted police shows. Another series that had wide success is Cheaters, which has been running since 2000 in the U.S. and is syndicated in over 100 countries worldwide. In 2001, the Academy of Television Arts and Sciences added the reality genre to the Emmy Awards in the category of Outstanding Reality Program. In 2003, to better differentiate between competition and informational reality programs, a second category, Outstanding Reality Competition Program, was added. In 2008, a third category, Outstanding Host for a Reality or Reality-Competition Program, was added. In 2007, the web series The Next Internet Millionaire appeared; it was a competition show based in part on The Apprentice and was billed as the world's first Internet reality show.

=== 2010s ===
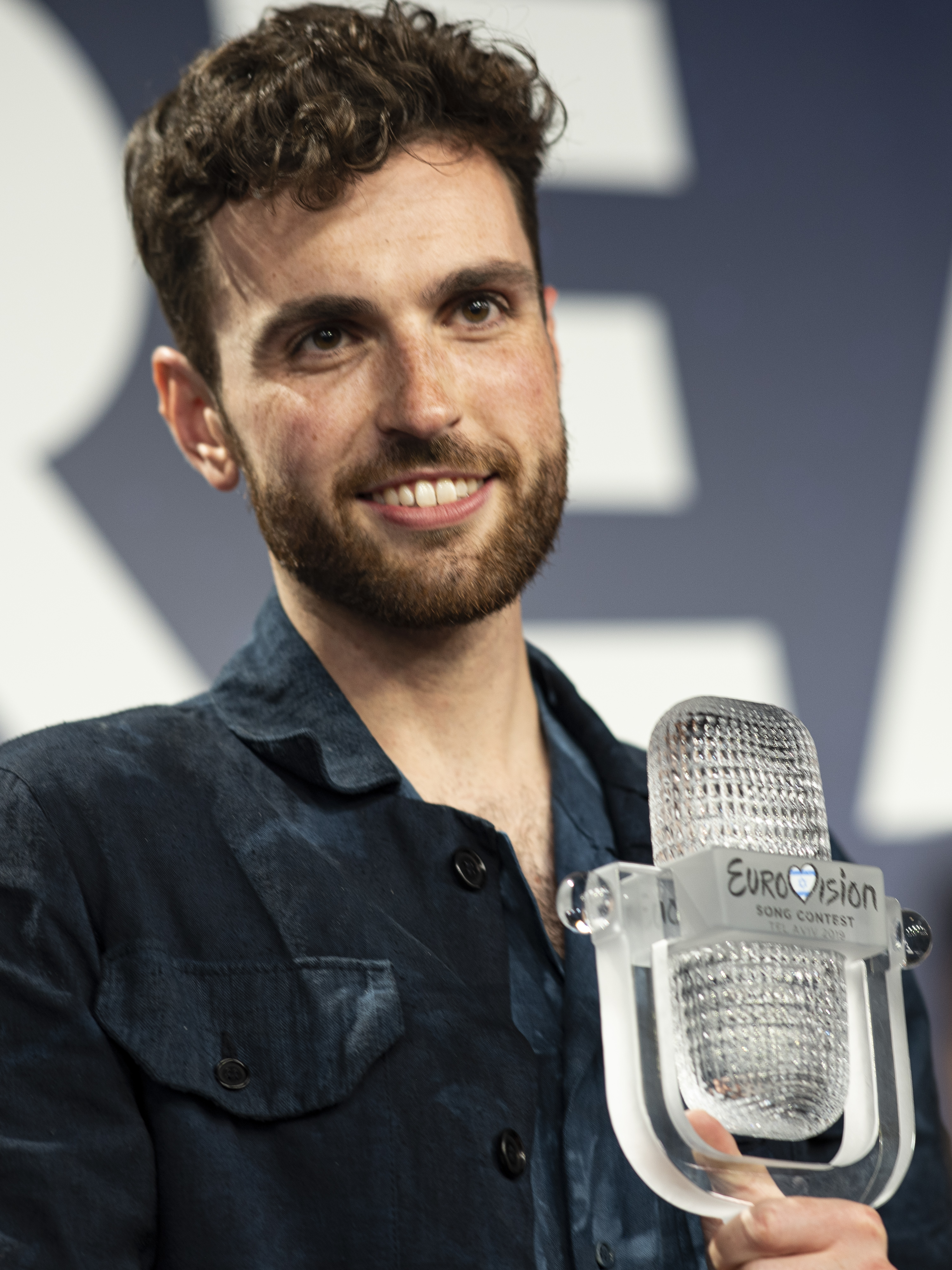
Duncan Laurence, who competed on the fifth season of singing competition show The Voice of Holland in 2014, with the trophy for winning the Eurovision Song Contest 2019

In 2010, Dutch network RTL 4 premiered The Voice of Holland, a new singing competition devised by former Endemol director John de Mol Jr. The format was differentiated primarily by its "blind audition" process, an opening round in which the judges ("coaches") are initially seated with their backs to the performers in rotating chairs, and must appraise them solely by their vocal performances. The judge can then press a button to signify they are interested in adding the singer to their team, which causes the chair to spin around and reveal the performer.

The Tester (2010–2012)—a reality series following contestants competing for a chance to become a game tester at Sony Computer Entertainment, was the first original live-action television program to be distributed exclusively via video game consoles, with its episodes being streamed via PlayStation Network.

By 2012, many of the long-running reality television show franchises in the United States, such as American Idol, Dancing with the Stars and The Bachelor, had begun to see declining ratings. However, reality television as a whole remained durable in the U.S., with hundreds of shows across many channels. In 2012, New York Magazine's Vulture blog published a humorous Venn diagram showing popular themes across American reality shows then running, including shows set in the U.S. states of Alaska, Louisiana and Texas, shows about cakes, weddings and pawnbrokers, and shows, usually competition-based, whose title includes the word "Wars".

Duck Dynasty (2012–2017), which focused on the Robertson family that founded Duck Commander, in 2013 became the most popular reality series in American cable television history. Its fourth-season premiere was viewed by nearly 12 million viewers in the United States, most of which were in rural markets. Its rural audience share ranked in the 30s, an extremely high number for any series, broadcast or cable.

Following from the 1900 House format, the BBC produced a series called Back in Time for Tea in which a family would experience tea time for various decades.

In 2014, Entertainment Weekly and Variety again noted a stagnation in reality television programs' ratings in the U.S., which they attributed to "The diminishing returns of cable TV's sea of reality sameness". They noted that a number of networks that featured reality programming, including Bravo and E!, were launching their first scripted shows, and others, including AMC, were abandoning plans to launch further reality programs; though they clarified that the genre as a whole "isn't going anywhere." Ratings and profits from reality TV continued to decline in the late 2010s.

In the mid-2010s, South Korean variety formats began to see increased international attention within the reality television market; the reality travelogue Grandpas Over Flowers was adapted by American network NBC as Better Late Than Never, becoming the first Korean variety format to ever be adapted by an American broadcaster. The Korean music competition series King of Mask Singer (2015)—which features celebrity contestants concealed by elaborate costume masks, and only revealing their identity once eliminated—was initially imported to other Asian territories such as Thailand. Its American adaptation by Fox was the third highest-rated series overall of both the 2018–19 and 2019–20 television seasons.

=== 2020s ===
Television development across all genres was impacted in 2020 by the COVID-19 pandemic, which forced many reality competition series to suspend production (and in some cases curtail a competition already in progress, such as Canadian and Malayalam versions of Big Brother), until such time that production could recommence with appropriate health and safety protocols approved by local authorities. Due to their quicker turnaround times, the American networks used reality series and other unscripted content (including those delayed from their summer lineups) to fill gaps in their schedules while the production of scripted programming resumed.

The popularity of The Masked Singer led to Fox greenlighting other guesswork-based game and reality shows in the early-2020s, such as the spin-off The Masked Dancer, fellow South Korean series I Can See Your Voice (where participants guess who among a group of contestants are good singers without ever hearing them sing), Game of Talents (where contestants guessed the talent of a variety act via clues), We Are Family (where contestants identified performers who are relatives of celebrities), and Crime Scene Kitchen (where contestants must identify the dessert that was prepared in a kitchen based on clues, and then attempt to recreate the dish themselves).

At the same time, reality television continued to evolve in response to broader platform shifts and changing audience behaviors. The rise of streaming services such as Netflix, Amazon Prime Video, and HBO Max led to a new wave of reality formats, including dating shows like Love Is Blind (2020–present) and Too Hot to Handle (2020–present), competitive series like The Circle (2020–present), and docu-soaps such as Dubai Bling (2022–present). Reality competitions centered around specialized skills, such as Is It Cake? (2022–present), gained popularity for offering cozy, niche viewing experiences that appealed to audiences seeking lighter, feel-good content. The demand for escapism and creativity during a period of global uncertainty led networks and streaming platforms alike to invest in more experimental and genre-blending formats.

Internationally, there was also a surge in non-Western reality content gaining global traction, particularly from South Korea, Japan, and India. Shows like Single's Inferno (South Korea, 2021–present), Physical: 100 (South Korea, 2023–present), Indian Matchmaking (India/USA, 2020–present showcased a blend of competition, romance, and cultural elements that resonated with worldwide audiences through platforms like Netflix.

== Subgenres ==
There have been various attempts to classify reality television shows into different subgenres:

- A 2006 study proposed six subgenres: romance, crime, informational, reality-drama, competition or game, and talent.
- A 2007 study proposed five subgenres: infotainment, docusoap, lifestyle, reality game shows, and lifestyle experiment programs.
- A 2009 study proposed eight subgenres: "gamedocs", dating programs, makeover programs, docusoaps, talent contests, court programs, reality sitcoms, and celebrity variations of other programs.

Another categorization divides reality television into two types: shows that purport to document real life, and shows that place participants in new circumstances. In a 2003 paper, theorists Elisabeth Klaus and Stephanie Lücke referred to the former category as "docusoaps", which consist of "narrative reality", and the latter category as "reality soaps", which consist of "performative reality". Since 2014, the Primetime Emmy Awards have used a similar classification, with separate awards for "unstructured reality" and "structured reality" programs, as well as a third award for "reality-competition" programs.

=== Documentary-style ===
In many reality television programs, camera shooting and footage editing give the viewer the impression that they are passive observers following people going about their daily personal and professional activities; this style of filming is sometimes referred to as fly on the wall, observational documentary or factual television. Story "plots" are often constructed via editing or planned situations, with the results resembling soap operas – hence the terms docusoap and docudrama. Documentary-style programs give viewers a private look into the lives of the subjects.

Within documentary-style reality television are several subcategories or variants:

==== First responder reality style ====
Please see list of programs: First responder reality shows

==== Food reality television ====
Please see main article: Food reality television

==== Soap-opera style ====
Although the term "docusoap" has been used for many documentary-style reality television shows, there have been shows that have deliberately tried to mimic the appearance and structure of soap operas. Such shows often focus on a close-knit group of people and their shifting friendships and romantic relationships. One highly influential such series was the American 2004–2006 series Laguna Beach: The Real Orange County, which attempted to specifically mimic the primetime soap opera The O.C., which had begun airing in 2003. Laguna Beach had a more drama-like feel than any previous reality television show, through the use of higher-quality lighting and cameras, voice-over narration instead of on-screen "confessionals", and slower pacing. Laguna Beach led to several spinoff series, most notably the 2006–2010 series The Hills. It also inspired various other series, including the highly successful British series The Only Way Is Essex and Made in Chelsea, and the Australian series Freshwater Blue.

Due to their dramatized feel, many of these shows have been accused of being pre-scripted, more so than other reality television shows have. The producers of The Only Way Is Essex and Made in Chelsea have admitted to coaching cast members on what to say in order to draw more emotion from each scene, although they insist that the underlying stories are real.

Another highly successful group of soap-opera-style shows is the Real Housewives franchise, which began with The Real Housewives of Orange County in 2006 and has since spawned nearly twenty other series, in the U.S. and internationally. The franchise has an older cast and different personal dynamics than that of Laguna Beach and its imitators, as well as lower production values, but similarly is meant to resemble scripted soap operas – in this case, the television series Desperate Housewives and Peyton Place.

A notable subset of such series focus on a group of women who are romantically connected to male celebrities; these include Basketball Wives (2010), Love & Hip Hop (2011), Hollywood Exes (2012), Ex-Wives of Rock (2012) and WAGS (2015). Most of these shows have had spin-offs in multiple locations.

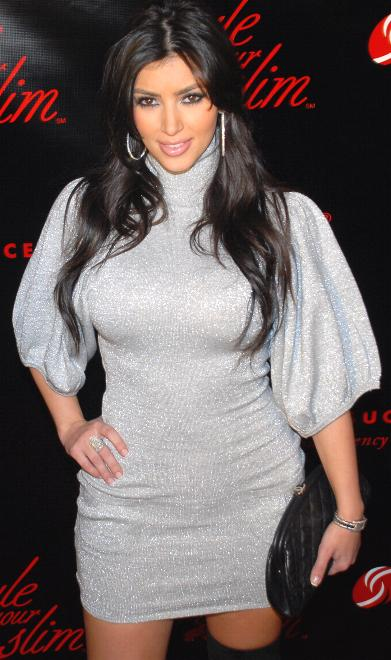
Reality TV personality Kim Kardashian

There are also fly-on-the-wall-style shows directly involving celebrities. Often these show a celebrity going about their everyday life: notable examples include The Anna Nicole Show, The Osbournes, Gene Simmons Family Jewels, Newlyweds: Nick and Jessica, Keeping Up with the Kardashians and Hogan Knows Best. VH1 in the mid-2000s had an entire block of such shows, known as "Celebreality". Shows such as these are often created with the idea of promoting a celebrity product or upcoming project.

==== Subcultures ====
Some documentary-style shows shed light on rarely seen cultures and lifestyles. One example is shows about people with disabilities or people who have unusual physical circumstances, such as the American series Push Girls and Little People, Big World, and the British programmes Beyond Boundaries, Britain's Missing Top Model, The Undateables and Seven Dwarves.

Another example is shows that portray the lives of ethnic or religious minorities. Examples include All-American Muslim (Lebanese-American Muslims), Shahs of Sunset (affluent Persian-Americans), Sister Wives (polygamists from a Mormon splinter group), Breaking Amish and Amish Mafia (the Amish), and Big Fat Gypsy Weddings and its spin-offs (Romani people).

The Real Housewives franchise offers a window into the lives of social-striving urban and suburban housewives. Many shows focus on wealth and conspicuous consumption, including Platinum Weddings, and My Super Sweet 16, which documented huge coming of age celebrations thrown by wealthy parents. Conversely, the highly successful Here Comes Honey Boo Boo and Duck Dynasty are set in poorer rural areas of the Southern United States.

==== Professional activities ====
Some documentary-style shows portray professionals either going about day-to-day business or performing an entire project over the course of a series. One early example (and the longest running reality show of any genre) is Cops, which debuted in 1989. Other such shows specifically relating to law enforcement include The First 48, Dog the Bounty Hunter, Police Stop!, Traffic Cops, Border Security and Motorway Patrol.

Shows set at a specific place of business include American Chopper, Miami Ink and its spin-offs, Bikini Barbershop and Lizard Lick Towing.

Shows that show people working in the same non-business location include Airport and Bondi Rescue.

Shows that portray a set of people in the same line of work, occasionally competing with each other, include Deadliest Catch, Ice Road Truckers and Million Dollar Listing Los Angeles and its spinoffs.

==== Financial transactions and appraisals ====
One notable subset of shows about professional activities is those in which the professionals haggle and engage in financial transactions, often over unique or rare items whose value must first be appraised. Two such shows, both of which have led to multiple spinoff shows, are Pawn Stars (about pawn shops) and American Pickers. Other shows, while based around such financial transactions, also show elements of its main cast members' personal and professional lives; these shows include Hardcore Pawn and Comic Book Men. Such shows have some antecedent in the British series Antiques Roadshow, which began airing in 1979 and has since spawned numerous international versions, although that show includes only appraisals and does not include bargaining or other dramatic elements.

==== Special living environment ====
Some documentary-style programs place cast members, who in most cases previously did not know each other, in staged living environments; The Real World was the originator of this format. In almost every other such type of programming, cast members are given specific challenges or obstacles to overcome. Road Rules, which first aired in 1995 as a spin-off of The Real World, created a show structure where the cast would travel to various countries performing challenges for prizes.

Big Brother is probably the best-known program of this type in the world, with around 50 international versions having been produced. Other shows in this category, such as The 1900 House and Lads' Army, involve historical re-enactment, with cast members living and working as people of a specific time and place. 2001's Temptation Island achieved some notoriety by placing several couples on an island surrounded by single people in order to test the couples' commitment to each other. The Challenge has contestants living together in an overseas residence, and has been around for over 30 seasons. The format of each season changes, however the main premise of the series involves a daily challenge, nomination process and elimination round. U8TV: The Lofters combined the "special living environment" format with the "professional activity" format noted earlier; in addition to living together in a loft, each member of the show's cast was hired to host a television program for a Canadian cable channel.

The Simple Life, Tommy Lee Goes to College and The Surreal Life are all shows in which celebrities are put into an unnatural environment.

==== Court shows ====
Originally, court shows were all dramatized and staged programs, with actors playing the litigants, witnesses and lawyers. The cases were either re-enactments of real-life cases or cases that were fictionalized altogether. Among examples of staged courtroom dramas are Famous Jury Trials, Your Witness, and the first two eras of Divorce Court. The People's Court revolutionized the genre by introducing the arbitration-based "reality" format in 1981, later adopted by the vast majority of court shows. The genre experienced a lull in programming after The People's Court was canceled in 1993, but then soared after the emergence of Judge Judy in 1996. This led to a slew of other reality court shows, such as Judge Mathis, Judge Joe Brown, Judge Alex, Judge Mills Lane and Judge Hatchett.

Though the litigants are legitimate, the "judges" in such shows are actually arbitrators, as these pseudo-judges are not actually presiding in a court of law. Typically, however, they are retired judges or at least individuals who have had some legal experience.

Courtroom programs are typically daytime television shows that air on weekdays.

==== Investments ====
The globally syndicated format Dragons' Den shows a group of wealthy investors choosing whether or not to invest in a series of pitched startup companies and entrepreneurial ventures. The series Restaurant Startup similarly involves investors, but involves more of a game show element in which restaurant owners compete to prove their worth. The British series Show Me the Monet offers a twist in which artworks' artistic value, rather than their financial value, is appraised by a panel of judges, who determine whether each one will be featured at an exhibition.

==== Outdoor survival ====
Another subgenre places people in wild and challenging natural settings. This includes such shows as Survivorman, Man vs. Wild, Marooned with Ed Stafford, Naked and Afraid and Alaskan Bush People. The shows Survivor and Get Out Alive with Bear Grylls combine outdoor survival with a competition format, although in Survivor the competition also involves social dynamics.

==== Self-improvement or makeover ====
Some reality television shows cover a person or group of people improving their lives. Sometimes the same group of people are covered over an entire season (as in The Swan and Celebrity Fit Club), but usually there is a new target for improvement in each episode. Despite differences in the content, the format is usually the same: first the show introduces the subjects in their current, less-than-ideal environment. Then the subjects meet with a group of experts, who give the subjects instructions on how to improve things; they offer aid and encouragement along the way. Finally, the subjects are placed back in their environment and they, along with their friends and family and the experts, appraise the changes that have occurred. Other self-improvement or makeover shows include The Biggest Loser, Extreme Weight Loss and Fat March (which cover weight loss), Extreme Makeover (entire physical appearance), Queer Eye, What Not to Wear, How Do I Look?, Trinny & Susannah Undress… and Snog Marry Avoid? (style and grooming), Supernanny (child-rearing), Made (life transformation), Tool Academy (relationship building) and Charm School and From G's to Gents (self-improvement and manners).

The concept of self-improvement was taken to its extreme with the British show Life Laundry, in which people who had become hoarders, even living in squalor, were given professional assistance. The American television series Hoarders and Hoarding: Buried Alive follow similar premises, presenting interventions in the lives of people who suffer from compulsive hoarding. The British series Sort Your Life Out, presented by Stacey Solomon, is similar, but it also redesigns the participants' houses.

In one study, participants who admitted to watching more reality television were more likely to proceed with a desired plastic surgery than those who watched less.

==== Renovation ====
Some shows makeover part or all of a person's living space, workspace, or vehicle. The American series This Old House, which debuted in 1979, features the start-to-finish renovation of different houses through a season; media critic Jeff Jarvis has speculated that it is "the original reality TV show." The British show Changing Rooms, beginning in 1996 (later remade in the U.S. as Trading Spaces) was the first such renovation show that added a game show feel with different weekly contestants.

House renovation shows are a mainstay on the American and Canadian cable channel HGTV, whose renovation shows include the successful franchises Flip or Flop, Love It or List It and Property Brothers, as well as shows such as Debbie Travis' Facelift, Designed to Sell and Holmes on Homes. Non-HGTV shows in this category include Extreme Makeover: Home Edition and While You Were Out.

Pimp My Ride and Overhaulin' show vehicles being rebuilt in a customized way.

==== Business improvement ====
In some shows, one or more experts try to improve a failing small business over the course of each episode. Examples that cover many types of business include We Mean Business and The Profit. Shows geared for a specific type of business include Ramsay's Kitchen Nightmares and Restaurant: Impossible (for restaurants), Bar Rescue (for bars) and Hotel Hell (for hotels).

==== Social experiment ====
Another type of reality program is the social experiment which produces drama, conflict, and sometimes transformation. British TV series Wife Swap, which began in 2003, and had many spin-offs in the UK and other countries, is a notable example. In the show, people with different values agree to live by each other's social rules for a period of time. Other shows in this category include Trading Spouses, Bad Girls Club and Holiday Showdown. Faking It was a series where people had to learn a new skill and pass themselves off as experts. Shattered was a controversial 2004 UK series in which contestants competed to see how long they could go without sleep. Solitary was a controversial 2006-2010 Fox Reality series which isolated contestants for weeks in solitary confinement pods with limited sleep, food and information while competing in elimination challenges which could be ended by pressing a 'quit' button, causing winners to go on for much longer than needed in a blind gamble to win.

The Dutch series De Verraders, adapted internationally as The Traitors, features contestants divided into two factions—the "traitors" and the "faithful"—and competing in challenges to build a cash jackpot awarded in the finale; three contestants designated as "traitors" (who are known to the viewers) have the ability to secretly eliminate ("murder") other contestants each night, while the remaining contestants are tasked with figuring out the identities of the traitors so they can attempt to "banish" them in elimination votes. The jackpot is split among the faithful if they eliminate all of the traitors, but is split among the traitors if they fail.

==== Hidden cameras ====
Another type of reality programming features hidden cameras rolling when random passers-by encounter a staged situation. Candid Camera, which first aired on television in 1948, pioneered the format. Modern variants of this type of production include Punk'd, Trigger Happy TV, Primetime: What Would You Do?, The Jamie Kennedy Experiment and Just for Laughs Gags. The series Scare Tactics and Room 401 are hidden-camera programs in which the goal is to frighten contestants rather than just befuddle or amuse them. The Belgian hidden camera series Sorry voor alles subjects a contestant to various staged situations over a month-long period, designed to analyze their personality and how they respond. After the contestant is taken to a studio and let off the hook, they then answer observation questions related to the events for a chance to win prizes.

Not all hidden camera shows use strictly staged situations. For example, the syndicated program Cheaters purports to use hidden cameras to record suspected cheating partners, although the authenticity of the show has been questioned, and even refuted by some who have been featured on the series. Once the evidence has been gathered, the accuser confronts the cheating partner with the assistance of the host. In many special-living documentary programs, hidden cameras are set up all over the residence in order to capture moments missed by the regular camera crew, or intimate bedroom footage.

==== Supernatural and paranormal ====
Supernatural and paranormal reality shows such as MTV's Fear, place participants into frightening situations which ostensibly involve paranormal phenomena such as ghosts, telekinesis or haunted houses. In series such as Celebrity Paranormal Project, the stated aim is investigation, and some series like Scariest Places on Earth challenge participants to survive the investigation; whereas others such as Paranormal State and Ghost Hunters use a recurring crew of paranormal researchers. In general, the shows follow similar stylized patterns of night vision, surveillance, and hand held camera footage; odd angles; subtitles establishing place and time; desaturated imagery; and non-melodic soundtracks. Noting the trend in reality shows that take the paranormal at face value, New York Times culture editor Mike Hale characterized ghost hunting shows as "pure theater" and compared the genre to professional wrestling or softcore pornography for its formulaic, teasing approach.

=== Reality competition or game shows ===
Another subgenre of reality television is "reality competition", "reality playoffs", or so-called "reality game shows", which follow the format of non-tournament elimination contests. Typically, participants are filmed competing to win a prize, often while living together in a confined environment. In many cases, participants are removed until only one person or team remains, who is then declared the winner. Usually this is done by eliminating participants one at a time (or sometimes two at a time, as an episodic twist due to the number of contestants involved and the length of a given season), through either disapproval voting or by voting for the most popular to win. Voting is done by the viewing audience, the show's own participants, a panel of judges, or some combination of the three.

A well-known example of a reality-competition show is the globally syndicated Big Brother, in which cast members live together in the same house, with participants removed at regular intervals by either the viewing audience or, in the American version, by the participants themselves. There remains disagreement over whether talent-search shows such as the Idol series, the Got Talent series and the Dancing with the Stars series are truly reality television or just newer incarnations of shows such as Star Search. Although the shows involve a traditional talent search, the shows follow the reality-competition conventions of removing one or more contestants in every episode, allowing the public to vote on who is removed, and interspersing performances with video clips showing the contestants' "back stories", their thoughts about the competition, their rehearsals and unguarded behind-the-scenes moments. Additionally, there is a good deal of unscripted interaction shown between contestants and judges. The American Primetime Emmy Awards have nominated both American Idol and Dancing with the Stars for the Outstanding Reality-Competition Program Emmy.

Game shows like Weakest Link, Who Wants to Be a Millionaire?, American Gladiators and Deal or No Deal, which were popular in the 2000s, also lie in a gray area: like traditional game shows (e.g., The Price Is Right, Jeopardy!), the action takes place in an enclosed television studio over a short period of time; however, they have higher production values, more dramatic background music, and higher stakes than traditional shows (done either through putting contestants into physical danger or offering large cash prizes). In addition, there is more interaction between contestants and hosts, and in some cases, they feature reality-style contestant competition or elimination as well. These factors, as well as these shows' rise in global popularity at the same time as the arrival of the reality craze, have led to such shows often being grouped under both the reality television and game show umbrellas.

There have been various hybrid reality-competition shows, like the worldwide-syndicated Star Academy, which combines the Big Brother and Idol formats, The Biggest Loser, which combines competition with the self-improvement format, and American Inventor, which uses the Idol format for products instead of people. Some reality shows that aired mostly during the early 2000s, such as Popstars, Making the Band and Project Greenlight, devoted the first part of the season to selecting a winner, and the second part to showing that person or group of people working on a project.

Popular variants of the competition-based format include the following:

==== Dating-based competition ====
Dating-based competition shows follow a contestant choosing one out of a group of suitors. Over the course of either a single episode or an entire season, suitors are eliminated until only the contestant and the final suitor remains. In the early 2000s, this type of reality show dominated the other genres on the major American networks. Examples include The Bachelor, its spin-off The Bachelorette, Temptation Island, Average Joe, Flavor of Love (a dating show featuring rapper Flavor Flav that led directly and indirectly to over 10 spin-offs), The Cougar and Love in the Wild. In Married by America, contestants were chosen by viewer voting. This is one of the older variants of the format; shows such as The Dating Game that date to the 1960s had similar premises (though each episode was self-contained, and not the serial format of more modern shows). One of the more recent hits was Farmer Wants a Wife.

==== Job search ====
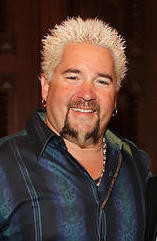
Chef and restaurateur Guy Fieri won the second season of Food Network's Food Network Star in 2006, and by 2010 had become "the face of the network".

In this category, the competition revolves around a skill that contestants were pre-screened for. Competitors perform a variety of tasks based on that skill, are judged, and are then kept or removed by a single expert or a panel of experts. The show is usually presented as a job search of some kind, in which the prize for the winner includes a contract to perform that kind of work and an undisclosed salary, although the award can simply be a sum of money and ancillary prizes, like a cover article in a magazine. The show also features judges who act as counselors, mediators and sometimes mentors to help contestants develop their skills further or perhaps decide their future position in the competition. Popstars, which debuted in 1999, may have been the first such show, while the Idol series has been the longest-running and, for most of its run, the most popular such franchise. The first job-search show which showed dramatic, unscripted situations may have been America's Next Top Model, which premiered in May 2003. Other examples include The Apprentice (which judges business skills); Hell's Kitchen, MasterChef and Top Chef (for chefs), The Great British Bake Off (for bakers), Shear Genius (for hair styling), Project Runway (for clothing design), Top Design and The Great Interior Design Challenge (for interior design), American Dream Builders (for home builders), Stylista (for fashion editors), Last Comic Standing (for comedians), I Know My Kid's a Star (for child performers), On the Lot (for filmmakers), RuPaul's Drag Race (for drag queens), The Shot (for fashion photographers), So You Think You Can Dance (for dancers), MuchMusic VJ Search and Food Network Star (for television hosts), Dream Job (for sportscasters), American Candidate (for aspiring politicians), Work of Art (for artists), Face Off (for prosthetic makeup artists), Ink Master and Best Ink (for tattoo artists), Platinum Hit (for songwriters), Top Shot (for marksmen) and The Tester (for game testers).

One notable subset, popular from approximately 2005 to 2012, consisted of shows in which the winner gets a specific part in a known film, television show, musical or performing group. Examples include Scream Queens (where the prize was a role in the Saw film series), The Glee Project (for a role on the television show Glee) and How Do You Solve a Problem like Maria? (the lead role in a revival of the musical The Sound of Music). The most extreme prize for such a show may have been for one of the first such shows, 2005's Rock Star: INXS, where the winner became the lead singer of the rock band INXS. J.D. Fortune, who won the show, went on to be INXS's lead singer until 2011.

Some shows use the same format with celebrities: in this case, there is no expectation that the winner will continue this line of work, and prize winnings often go to charity. The most popular such shows have been the Dancing with the Stars and Dancing on Ice franchises. Other examples of celebrity competition programs include Deadline, Celebracadabra and Celebrity Apprentice.

==== Different contestants per episode ====
Some job-related competition shows have a different set of contestants competing on every episode, and thus more closely resemble game shows, although the "confessional" commentary provided by contestants gives them a reality TV aspect. The 1993-1999 Japanese cooking competition Iron Chef could be considered an early example, although it does not include commentary by the participants, only by announcers and judges.

Cooking competition shows with different contestants per episode that are considered reality shows include the Chopped, Come Dine with Me and Nailed It! franchises, along with Cupcake Wars, Cutthroat Kitchen, and Guy's Grocery Games. Non-cooking competition shows with a similar format include Forged in Fire (whose producer cited Food Network's competition programs as a direct inspiration), and The Butcher.

==== Immunity ====
One concept pioneered by, and unique to, reality competition shows is the idea of immunity, in which a contestant can win the right to be exempt the next time contestants are eliminated from the show. Possibly the first instance of immunity in reality TV was on Survivor, which premiered in 1997 in Sweden as Expedition Robinson, before gaining international prominence after the American edition (titled Survivor) premiered in 2000. On that show, there are complex rules around immunity: a player can achieve it by winning challenges (either as a team in the tribal phase or individually in the merged phase), or, in more recent seasons, through finding a hidden totem. They can also pass on their immunity to someone else and in the latter case, they can keep their immunity secret from other players.

On most shows, immunity is quite a bit simpler: it is usually achieved by winning a task, often a relatively minor task during the first half of the episode; the announcement of immunity is made publicly and immunity is usually non-transferable. At some point in the season, immunity ceases to be available, and all contestants are susceptible to elimination. Competition shows that have featured immunity include the Apprentice, Big Brother, Biggest Loser, Top Model, Project Runway, Lego Masters, and Top Chef franchises. Immunity may come with additional power as well, such as in the American version of Big Brother where the winning contestant usually has influence over deciding who faces an elimination vote later in the week. In one Apprentice episode, a participant chose to waive his earned immunity and was immediately "fired" for giving up this "powerful asset".

=== Sports ===
Sport-related reality shows can fall within the aforementioned sub-genres, either using it as the basis of competition, or by following sport as a profession:

- Competition-based programs, featuring groups of athletes competing against each other in challenges and events within a specific sport, such as athletics (Ninja Warrior, Exatlon), golf (The Big Break), auto racing (Crash Course, Hyperdrive, Pinks), and combat sports (The Contender, The Ultimate Fighter) for example. In the case of combat sports examples, the UFC-produced mixed martial arts competition series The Ultimate Fighter, and WWE's professional wrestling talent searches Tough Enough, Diva Search, NXT (before it was reformatted as a traditional wrestling show with developmental talent) and LFG, a contract with the respective organization was the grand prize.
  - Some series may follow non-sportspeople (usually celebrities, or in some cases athletes known for their participation in a different sport) training and participating in a sporting event, such as The Games, Irish series Celebrity Bainisteoir (where celebrities are tasked to become the managers of mid-level Gaelic football teams), and Dancing on Ice and Battle of the Blades (figure skating competitions with similarities to Dancing with the Stars).
- Documentary-style series following specific competitions, teams, or athletes, such as Knight School (Texas Tech Raiders men's basketball) Hard Knocks (NFL), All or Nothing, and Drive to Survive (Formula One).
- Docusoaps following the lives of athletes and/or their families, such as Total Divas (women in WWE) and WAGS (wives and girlfriends of sportspeople).

=== Parodies and hoaxes ===
Some reality shows aim to satirize and deconstruct the conventions and cliches of the genre, usually for comedic effect, but occasionally to bring attention to other social issues. In such cases, a fictitious premise is presented to the audience and/or participants, with the rest of the cast consisting of actors and other figures that are in on the hoax.

- The Joe Schmo Show, a series in which one or more civilians are set up as contestants on a fictitious reality competition, with the remaining "contestants" being actors playing characters representing stereotypical archetypes of reality television contestants. The first season portrayed a Big Brother–like show entitled Lap of Luxury, with subsequent seasons featuring the dating show Last Chance for Love (which featured both a man and woman as the targets) and a job hunt competition in the field of bounty hunting (Full Bounty; its broadcaster Spike concealed the third season by announcing Full Bounty within a slate of new reality series in production for the channel, without immediately revealing it was actually a Joe Schmo Show revival).
- My Big Fat Obnoxious Boss, a parody of The Apprentice in which the contestants were given challenges with inane objectives by businessman Mr. N. Paul Todd (an anagram of Apprentice host Donald Trump). The final decision on eliminations in each episode was always given to Todd's "real boss"—revealed in the series finale to have been a chimpanzee spinning a wheel with the contestants' names on it.
- Superstar USA, a parody of American Idol attempting to find the worst singer. The judges criticized good singers and eliminated them, but bad singers were praised and allowed to progress further through the competition.
- De Grote Donorshow, a 2007 Dutch special intended to raise awareness of the Netherlands' low organ donation rates. The special featured three patients competing to receive a kidney donation from a terminally-ill woman, who was able to receive advice from viewer text messages. At the end of the show, the competition was revealed to be a hoax: the ill woman was played by an actor, but the three competitors were actual kidney patients. In the month following the program's airing, the Netherlands' organ donation registry registered over 7,300 new donors.
- Space Cadets, a series in which a group of contestants were set up on the purported reality competition series Thrill Seekers, where they would allegedly receive astronaut training in Russia and compete to become Britain's first space tourists.
- I Wanna Marry "Harry", a hoax dating competition where single women were manipulated into believing they were competing for the affection of Prince Harry, but in reality "Harry" was actually a lookalike.
- Nathan for You, a reality mockumentary in which Nathan Fielder (as an exaggerated and socially awkward version of himself) attempts to help struggling businesses, but employs unusual and outlandish strategies to do so—such as rebranding a coffee shop as a parody of the Starbucks chain in which everything is prepended with the word "dumb", and trying to make the lifting of boxes into an exercise fad so the owner of a moving company could receive free labor under the guise of marketing himself as a personal trainer. Although aware they were on a reality program, the employees of the businesses featured were unaware of the show's comedic nature, and reacted genuinely to Fielder's antics. On multiple occasions, the show received media attention related to its stunts prior to broadcast.
  - In 2022, Fielder premiered a spiritual successor to the series for HBO, The Rehearsal, which follows him (once again, as an exaggerated version of himself) helping individuals "rehearse" for difficult social interactions and life events. Parts of these efforts often involve Fielder manipulating subjects into increasingly outlandish scenarios.
- Jury Duty, a mockumentary series portraying a fictional jury trial in which one member of the jury is not aware that the entire trial and its events are planned and acted out.
- The Underdog: Josh Must Win, a 2024 British series in which a cast of contestants are set up on a Big Brother-like show entitled The Favourite. However, a group of celebrities (themselves alumni of other reality shows) are tasked with manipulating the show from behind the scenes to ensure that Josh—a contestant who is portrayed as a contrasting underdog to the rest of the cast—wins the competition. If successful, all ten contestants would get to split the final prize money.
- Bradley Walsh's Million Pound Shot, a 2026 Channel 4 special, was presented as if it were a game show "event", where contestants would be required to wager their own money. The "show" was actually a hoax intended to deconstruct predatory practices within the gambling industry.

== Criticism and analysis ==
=== "Reality" as misnomer ===
The authenticity of reality television is often called into question by its detractors. The genre's title of "reality" is often criticized as being inaccurate because of claims that the genre frequently includes elements such as premeditated scripting (including a practice called "soft-scripting"), acting, urgings from behind-the-scenes crew to create specified situations of adversity and drama, and misleading editing. It has often been described as "scripting without paper".

In many cases, the entire premise of the show is contrived, based around a competition or another unusual situation. Some shows have been accused of using fakery in order to create more compelling television, such as having premeditated storylines and in some cases feeding participants lines of dialogue, focusing only on participants' most outlandish behavior, and altering events through editing and re-shoots.

Shows such as Survivor and Amazing Race that offer a monetary prize are regulated in the United States by federal "game show" law, 47 U.S.C. § 509, and are monitored during the filming by the legal staff and standards and practice staff of the parent network. These shows cannot be manipulated in any way that affects the outcome of the game. However, misleading editing does not fall into altering the fairness of the competition.

Beyond concerns about authenticity, media critics have argued that reality television may have broader societal consequences. In 2022, Time magazine TV critic Judy Berman wrote that "to the extent that the U.S. has become a harsher, shallower, angrier, more divided place in the 21st century, reality TV, which has helped normalize cruelty, belligerence, superficiality, and disloyalty, and rewarded people who weaponize those traits, bears a share of the blame."

Reality television shows that have been accused of, or admitted to, deception include The Real World, the American version of Survivor, Joe Millionaire, The Hills, A Shot at Love with Tila Tequila, Hogan Knows Best, Extreme Makeover: Home Edition, The Bachelor and The Bachelorette, Pawn Stars, Storage Wars, Squid Game: The Challenge and Keeping Up with the Kardashians.

In contrast, critic Matt Zoller Seitz praised Deadliest Catch as having "brought old-school documentary sobriety to a genre more often known for shamelessness."

=== Political and cultural impact ===
Reality television's global success has become, in the view of some analysts, an important political phenomenon. In some authoritarian countries, reality-television voting has provided the first opportunity for many citizens to vote in any free and fair wide-scale "elections". In addition, the frankness of the settings on some reality shows presents situations that are often taboo in certain conservative cultures, like Star Academy Arab World, which began airing in 2003, and which shows male and female contestants living together. A Pan-Arab version of Big Brother was cancelled in 2004 after less than two weeks on the air after a public outcry and street protests. In 2004 journalist Matt Labash, noting both of these issues, wrote that "the best hope of little Americas developing in the Middle East could be Arab-produced reality TV".

In 2007, Abu Dhabi TV began airing Million's Poet, a show featuring Pop Idol-style voting and elimination, but for the writing and oration of Arabic poetry. The show became popular in Arab countries, with around 18 million viewers, partly because it was able to combine the excitement of reality television with a traditional, culturally relevant topic. In April 2010, however, the show also became a subject of political controversy, when Hissa Hilal, a 43-year-old female Saudi competitor, read out a poem criticizing her country's Muslim clerics. Both critics and the public reacted favorably to Hilal's poetry; she received the highest scores from the judges throughout the competition and came in third place overall.

In India, in the summer of 2007, coverage of the third season of Indian Idol focused on the breaking down of cultural and socioeconomic barriers as the public rallied around the show's top two contestants.

The Chinese singing competition Super Girl (a local imitation of Pop Idol) has similarly been cited for its political and cultural impact. After the finale of the show's 2005 season drew an audience of around 400 million people, and eight million text-message votes, the state-run English-language newspaper Beijing Today ran the front-page headline: "Is Super Girl a Force for Democracy?" The Chinese government criticized the show, citing both its democratic nature and its excessive vulgarity, or "worldliness", and in 2006 banned it outright. It was later reintroduced in 2009, before being banned again in 2011. Super Girl has also been criticized by non-government commentators for creating seemingly impossible ideals that may be harmful to Chinese youth.

In Indonesia, reality television shows have surpassed soap operas as the most-watched broadcast programs. One popular program, Jika Aku Menjadi ("If I Were"), follows young, middle-class people as they are temporarily placed into lower-class life, where they learn to appreciate their circumstances back home by experiencing daily life for the less fortunate. Critics have claimed that this and similar programs in Indonesia reinforce traditionally Western ideals of materialism and consumerism. However, Eko Nugroho, reality-show producer and president of Dreamlight World Media, insists that these reality shows are not promoting American lifestyles but rather reaching people through their universal desires.

Reality television has also received criticism in Britain and the United States for its ideological relationship with surveillance societies and consumerism. Writing in The New York Times in 2012, author Mark Andrejevic characterised the role of reality television in a post-9/11 society as the normalisation of surveillance in participatory monitoring, the "logic of the emerging surveillance economy", and in the promise of a societal self-image that is contrived. An LSE paper by Nick Couldry associates reality television with neoliberalism, condemning the ritualised enactment and consumption of what must be legitimised for the society it serves.

=== As a substitute for scripted drama ===
Reality television generally costs less to produce than scripted series.

VH1 executive vice president Michael Hirschorn wrote in 2007 that the plots and subject matters on reality television are more authentic and more engaging than in scripted dramas, writing that scripted network television "remains dominated by variants on the police procedural… in which a stock group of characters (ethnically, sexually, and generationally diverse) grapples with endless versions of the same dilemma. The episodes have all the ritual predictability of Japanese Noh theater, " while reality television is "the liveliest genre on the set right now. It has engaged hot-button cultural issues – class, sex, race – that respectable television… rarely touches."

Television critic James Poniewozik wrote in 2008 that reality shows like Deadliest Catch and Ice Road Truckers showcase working-class people of the kind that "used to be routine" on scripted network television, but that became a rarity in the 2000s: "The better to woo upscale viewers, TV has evicted its mechanics and dockworkers to collect higher rents from yuppies in coffeehouses."

In a 2021 interview, filmmaker Mike White (who had previously competed on The Amazing Race and Survivor) said that reality competition shows like Survivor accurately conveyed how, in real life, "so much of self is situational", so that, as circumstances change, "the oppressed becomes the oppressor, the bully becomes the bullied." In contrast, he felt that in scripted drama "there's a lot of religiosity around humanity."

=== Instant celebrity ===
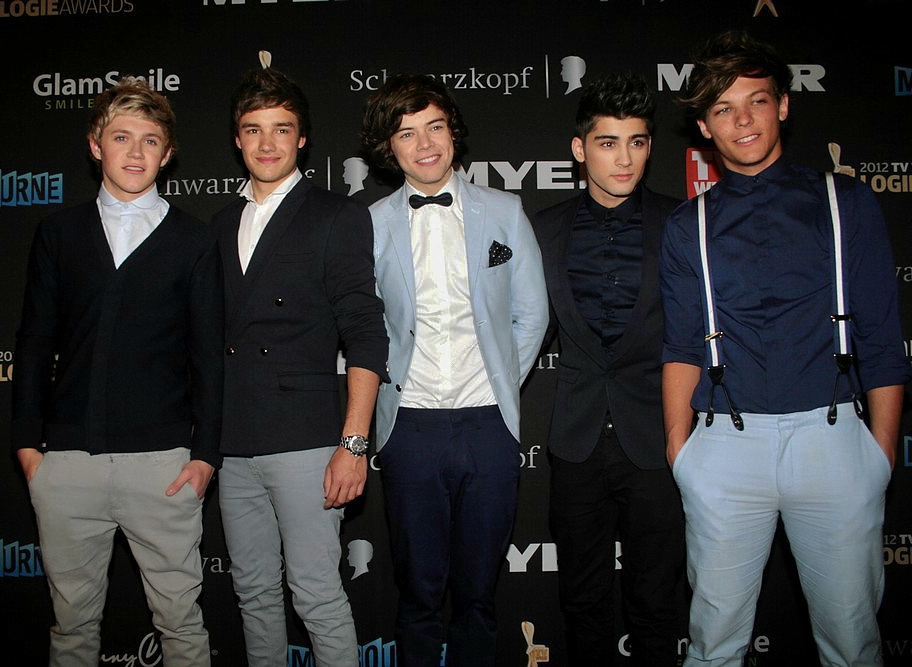
The English-Irish boy band One Direction formed during the seventh series of the British singing competition The X Factor in 2010, and later became one of the best-selling boy bands of all time.

Reality television has the potential to turn its participants into national celebrities, at least for a short period. This is most notable in talent-search programs such as Idol and The X Factor, which have spawned music stars in many of the countries in which they have aired. Many other shows, however, have made mostly temporary celebrities out of their participants; some participants have then been able to parlay this fame into media and merchandising careers. Participants of non-talent-search programs who have had subsequent acting careers include Lilian Afegbai, Jacinda Barrett, Jamie Chung, Stephen Colletti, David Giuntoli, Vishal Karwal, NeNe Leakes and Angela Trimbur; though Barrett and Trimbur were already aspiring actresses when they appeared on reality television. Reality TV participants who have become television hosts and personalities include Nabilla Benattia, Rachel Campos-Duffy, Kristin Cavallari, Colby Donaldson, Raffaella Fico, Elisabeth Hasselbeck, Katie Hopkins, Rebecca Jarvis, Jodie Marsh, Heidi Montag, Tiffany Pollard and Whitney Port; some of them have had acting careers as well. Reality TV participants who have become television personalities as well as successful entrepreneurs include Gemma Collins, Lauren Conrad, Jade Goody, Bethenny Frankel and Spencer Matthews. Several cast members of MTV's Jersey Shore have had lucrative endorsement deals, and in some cases their own product lines. Wrestlers Mike "The Miz" Mizanin and David Otunga got their start on non-athletic reality shows.

In Australia, various reality TV personalities have later served as radio hosts, including Fitzy and Rachel Corbett from Big Brother, Mick Newell from My Kitchen Rules, Heather Maltman from The Bachelor, and Sam Frost from The Bachelorette.

Some reality-television alumni have parlayed their fame into paid public appearances.

Several socialites, or children of famous parents, who were somewhat well known before they appeared on reality television shows have become much more famous as a result, including Paris Hilton, Nicole Richie, Kelly Osbourne, Kim Kardashian, and many of the rest of the Kardashian family.

Reality television personalities often get derided as "Z-list celebrities". Some have been lampooned for exploiting an undeserved "15 minutes of fame". The Kardashian family is one such group of reality television personalities who were subject to this criticism in the 2010s, Kim Kardashian in particular.

=== Springboard for political success ===
Two international franchises, The Apprentice and Dragons' Den, are notable for having some of the business people who appeared there as judges and investors go on to win political office. The prime example is President of the United States Donald Trump: his stint as host of the original The Apprentice from 2004 to 2015 has been credited by some commentators as a factor in his political success, since it greatly increased his fame, and showcased him as a tough and experienced authority figure. Lado Gurgenidze, who hosted the Georgian version of The Apprentice in 2005, was appointed Prime Minister of Georgia from 2007, and served until 2008. Harry Harkimo, who hosted the Finnish version of The Apprentice from 2009 to 2013, has been a member of the Parliament of Finland since 2015. João Doria, who hosted seasons 7-8 of the Brazilian version of The Apprentice, O Aprendiz, from 2010 to 2011, served as Mayor of São Paulo from 2017 to 2018, and as Governor of São Paulo from 2018 to 2022. Bruno Bonnell, who hosted the short-lived French version of The Apprentice in 2015, was a member of France's National Assembly from 2017 to 2022.

Dragons' Den investors who have gone on to hold political office after appearing on their country's version of the program include Tommy Ahlers of Denmark, Nir Barkat of Israel, Anne Berner of Finland, Tomio Okamura of the Czech Republic, and Lencke Wischhusen of Germany.

In a rare case of a previously unknown reality television alumnus succeeding in the political arena, The Real World: Boston cast member Sean Duffy was a U.S. representative from Wisconsin from 2010 to 2019.

=== Youth audience ===
In 2006, four of the ten most popular programs among viewers under 17 were reality shows. Studies have shown that young people emulate the behavior displayed on these programs, gathering much of their knowledge of the social world, particularly about consumer practices, from television. Some critics have decried the positive representation of sexually objectified women in shows like The Girls Next Door.

In 2007, according to the Learning and Skills Council, one in seven UK teenagers hoped to gain fame by appearing on reality television.

=== Appeal ===
A number of studies have tried to pinpoint the appeal of reality television. Factors that have been cited in its appeal include personal identification with the onscreen participants; pure entertainment; diversion from scripted TV; vicarious participation; a feeling of self-importance compared to onscreen participants; enjoyment of competition; and an appeal to voyeurism, especially given "scenes which take place in private settings, contain nudity, or include gossip".

A 2012 survey by Today.com found that Americans who watch reality television regularly are more extroverted, more neurotic, and have lower self-esteem than those who do not.

== Similar works in popular culture ==
A number of fictional works since the 1940s have contained elements similar to elements of reality television. They tended to be set in a dystopian future, with subjects being recorded against their will and often involved violence.

- "The Seventh Victim" (1953) is a short story by science fiction author Robert Sheckley that depicted a futuristic game in which one player gets to hunt down another player and kill him. The first player who can score ten kills wins the grand prize. This story was the basis for the Italian film The 10th Victim (1965).
- You're Another, a 1955 short story by Damon Knight, is about a man who discovers that he is an actor in a "livie", a live-action show that is viewed by billions of people in the future.
- A King in New York, a 1957 film written and directed by Charlie Chaplin has the main character, a fictional European monarch portrayed by Chaplin, secretly filmed while talking to people at a New York cocktail party. The footage is later turned into a television show within the film.
- "The Prize of Peril" (1958), another Robert Sheckley story, is about a television show in which a contestant volunteers to be hunted for a week by trained killers, with a large cash prize if he survives. It was adapted in 1970 as the TV movie Das Millionenspiel, and again in 1983 as the movie Le Prix du Danger.
- Richard G. Stern's novel Golk (1960) is about a hidden-camera show similar to Candid Camera.
- "It Could Be You" (1964), a short story by Australian Frank Roberts, features a day-in-day-out televised blood sport.
- "Survivor" (1965), a science fiction novelette by Walter F. Moudy, depicted the 2050 "Olympic War Games" between Russia and the United States. The games are fought to show the world the futility of war and thus deter further conflict. Each side has one hundred soldiers who fight in a large natural arena. The goal is for one side to wipe out the other; the few who survive the battle become heroes. The games are televised, complete with color commentary discussing tactics, soldiers' personal backgrounds, and slow-motion replays of their deaths.
- "Bread and Circuses" (1968) is an episode of the science fiction television series Star Trek in which the crew visits a planet resembling the Roman Empire, but with 20th-century technology. The planet's "Empire TV" features regular gladiatorial games, with the announcer urging viewers at home to vote for their favorites, stating, "This is your program. You pick the winner."
- The Year of the Sex Olympics (1968) is a BBC television play in which a dissident in a dictatorship is forced onto a secluded island and taped for a reality show in order to keep the masses entertained.
- The Unsleeping Eye (1973), a novel by D.G. Compton (also published as The Continuous Katherine Mortenhoe), is about a woman dying of cancer whose last days are recorded without her knowledge for a television show. It was later adapted as the 1980 movie Death Watch.
- "Ladies and Gentlemen, This Is Your Crisis" (1976) is a short story by science fiction author Kate Wilhelm about a television show in which contestants (including a B-list actress who is hoping to revitalize her career) attempt to make their way to a checkpoint after being dropped off in the Alaskan wilderness, while being filmed and broadcast around the clock through an entire weekend. The story focuses primarily on the show's effect on a couple whose domestic tensions and eventual reconciliation parallel the dangers faced by the contestants.
- The film Network (1976) includes a subplot in which network executives negotiate with an urban terrorist group for the production of a weekly series, each episode of which was to feature an act of terrorism. The climax of the film has the terrorist group being turned against the network's own unstable star, news commentator Howard Beale.
- The Running Man (1982) is a book by Stephen King depicting a game show in which a contestant flees around the world from "hunters" trying to chase him down and kill him; it has been speculated that the book was inspired by "The Prize of Peril". The book was loosely adapted as a 1987 movie of the same name. The movie removed most of the reality-TV element of the book: its competition now took place entirely within a large television studio, and more closely resembled an athletic competition (though a deadly one).
- The film 20 Minutes into the Future (1985), and the spin-off television series Max Headroom, revolved around television mainly based on live, often candid, broadcasts. In one episode of Max Headroom, "Academy", the character Blank Reg fights for his life on a courtroom game show, with the audience deciding his fate.
- Vengeance on Varos (1985) is a serial of the television show Doctor Who in which the population of a planet watches live television broadcasts of the torture and executions of those who oppose the government. The planet's political system is based on the leaders themselves facing disintegration if the population votes 'no' to their propositions.

== Pop culture references ==
Some scripted and written works have used reality television as a plot device:

=== Films ===
- Real Life (1979) is a comedic film about the creation of a show similar to An American Family gone horribly wrong.
- Louis the 19th, King of the Airwaves (1994) is a Québécois film about a man who signs up to star in a 24-hour-a-day reality television show.
- The Truman Show (1998) is a film about a man (Jim Carrey) who discovers that his entire life is being staged and filmed for a 24-hour-a-day reality television show.
- EDtv (1999) was a remake of Louis the 19th, King of the Airwaves.
- Series 7: The Contenders (2001) is a film about a reality show in which contestants have to kill each other to win.
- Halloween: Resurrection (2002) is a horror slasher film that takes place in a wired house full of surveillance cameras. Each "contestant" is recorded as they attempt to survive and solve the mystery of the murders.
- American Dreamz (2006) is a film set partially on an American Idol-like show.
- Slumdog Millionaire (2008) is a film in which a contestant on the Indian version of Who Wants to Be a Millionaire? is interrogated because he knows all the answers.

=== Television ===
- The Comeback (2005) satirizes the indignity of reality television by presenting itself as "raw footage" of a new reality show documenting the attempted comeback of has-been star Valerie Cherish.
- The Doctor Who episode "Bad Wolf" (2005) is set in a space station, Satellite Five, where residents of Earth are randomly abducted and forced to participate in lethal incarnations of reality and quiz shows, such as Big Brother and The Weakest Link (the latter hosted by a robot modeled after the real show's then-host Anne Robinson).
- In the season 5 episode "Damien Sands" of American TV show Nip/Tuck (2007), Christian Troy, jealous over Sean McNamara's newfound fame, convinces Sean to tape a reality show based on their careers as plastic surgeons, with disastrous results.
- Dead Set (2008) is a British television program featuring a zombie apocalypse affecting the Big Brother house. Part of the film was shot during an actual eviction with host Davina McCall making a cameo appearance.
- Britain's Got the Pop Factor… and Possibly a New Celebrity Jesus Christ Soapstar Superstar Strictly on Ice (2008) is a British comedy special that satirized the conventions of reality talent competitions (including, in particular, their reliance on emotional "sob stories" intended to promote empathy from viewers), depicting the series finale of the in-universe reality competition Britain's Got the Pop Factor (an amalgamation of Britain's Got Talent, Pop Idol, and The X Factor).
- Rock Rivals (2008) is a British television show about two judges on a televised singing contest whose marriage is falling apart.
- "Fifteen Million Merits" (2011) is an episode in the first season of British television anthology series Black Mirror, set in a dystopian future in which appearing on reality television is the only way in which people can escape their miserable, jail-like conditions.
- Unreal (2015) is an American television show that depicts the behind-the-scenes drama on a show similar to The Bachelor

=== Literature ===
- Chart Throb (2006) is a comic novel by Ben Elton that parodies The X Factor and The Osbournes, among other reality shows.
- Dead Famous (2001) is a comedic whodunit novel, also by Ben Elton, in which a contestant is murdered while on a Big Brother-like show.
- Oryx and Crake (2003), a speculative fiction novel by Margaret Atwood, occasionally makes mentions of the protagonist and his friend entertaining themselves by watching reality television shows of live executions, Noodie News, frog squashing, graphic surgery, and child pornography.
- L.A. Candy (2009) is a young adult novel series by Lauren Conrad, which is based on her experiences on Laguna Beach: The Real Orange County and The Hills.

== Other influences on popular culture ==
A number of scripted television comedy and satire shows have adopted the format of the documentary-type reality television show, in "mockumentary" style. The first such show was the BBC series Operation Good Guys, which premiered in 1997. Arguably the best-known and most influential such show is the BBC's The Office (2001), which spawned numerous international remakes, including a successful American version. Other examples include People Like Us (BBC UK, 1998), The Games (ABC Australia, 1999), Trailer Park Boys (2001), Reno 911! (2003), The Naked Brothers Band (2006), Summer Heights High (2007), Parks and Recreation (2009), Modern Family (2009), Come Fly with Me (2010), Real Husbands of Hollywood (2013), Trial & Error (2017), Cut (2017) and Abbott Elementary (2021). The genre has even encompassed cartoons (Drawn Together (2004) and Total Drama (2007)) and a show about puppets (The Muppets, 2015).

Not all reality-television-style mockumentary series are comedic: the 2013 American series Siberia has a science fiction-horror bent, while the 2014 Dutch series The First Years is a drama.

The 2013–2015 American sketch comedy series Kroll Show set most of its sketches as excerpts from various fictional reality television shows, which one critic wrote "aren't far off from the lineups at E!, Bravo, and VH1", and parodied those shows' participants' "lack of self-awareness". The show also satirized the often incestuous nature of reality television, in which some series lead to a cascade of spinoffs. Kroll Show executive producer John Levenstein said in an interview that reality TV "has so many tools for telling stories in terms of text and flashbacks and ways to show things to the audience that it's incredibly convenient for comedy and storytelling if you use the full reality show toolkit."

Some feature films have been produced that use some of the conventions of reality television; such films are sometimes referred to as reality films, and sometimes simply as documentaries. Allen Funt's 1970 hidden camera movie What Do You Say to a Naked Lady? was based on his reality-television show Candid Camera. The series Jackass spawned five feature films, starting with Jackass: The Movie in 2002. A similar Finnish show, The Dudesons, was adapted for the film The Dudesons Movie, and a similar British show, Dirty Sanchez, was adapted for Dirty Sanchez: The Movie, both in 2006. The producers of The Real World created The Real Cancun in 2003. The Chinese reality show Keep Running was adapted for the 2015 film Running Man.

The 2003 BBC film The Other Boleyn Girl incorporated reality TV-style confessionals in which the two main characters talked directly to the camera.

In 2007, broadcaster Krishnan Guru-Murthy stated that reality television is "a firm and embedded part of television's vocabulary, used in every genre from game-shows and drama to news and current affairs."

The mumblecore film genre, which began in the mid-2000s, and uses video cameras and relies heavily on improvisation and non-professional actors, has been described as influenced in part by what one critic called "the spring-break psychodrama of MTV's The Real World". Mumblecore director Joe Swanberg has said, "As annoying as reality TV is, it's been really good for filmmakers because it got mainstream audiences used to watching shaky camerawork and different kinds of situations."

== See also ==
- Broadcasting
- Bunim/Murray Productions
- Great Reality TV Swindle
- List of reality television programs
- List of television show franchises
- Low culture
- Scripted reality
- TV consumption
