= List of programs broadcast by MTV2 =

MTV2 is an American pay television channel and the sister channel to MTV. It was launched in 1996 as a music video channel before starting to produce original television series and special events in the 2000s; though since the mid-2010s, it has mostly aired reruns of black sitcoms from the 1990s and MTV's original programming.

All series and special events listed on this page either originally aired on MTV2 or regularly aired in repeats on the channel. MTV2 has also aired other MTV shows in an irregular pattern. For these shows, see List of programs broadcast by MTV.

== Current programming ==
=== Programming from various Paramount Media Networks ===
==== MTV ====
- Ridiculousness
- The Challenge

==== Paramount Network ====
- Ink Master (2023–Present)
- Auction Hunters (2025–Present)

=== Other acquired series repeats ===
- The Fresh Prince of Bel-Air (2017–present)
- The Jamie Foxx Show (2016–present)
- The Wayans Bros. (2011–present)

=== Award show simulcasts ===
- BET Awards (2016–present)
- MTV Movie & TV Awards (2016–present)
- MTV Video Music Awards (2006–present)
- NAACP Image Awards (2021–present)

== Former programming ==
=== Original programming ===
==== Music ====
- Videography/Timeslide (1997–2001)
- Playback (1998–2001)
- Amp (2000–2002)
- Artist Collection (2000–2004)
- 120 Minutes (2001–2003, 2011–2013, moved from MTV)
- Control Freak (2001–2005)
- Latest and Greatest (2001–2004, 2007)
- MTV2 Hip-Hop (2001–2003)
- MTV2 Request (2001)
- MTV2 Rock (2001–2004, 2005)
- MTV2 Soul (2001–2003)
- Back in Play (2002–2003)
- Chart2Chart (2002–2003)
- The Definitive (2002–2004)
- Hip-Hop Countdown (2002–2005)
- MTV2 $2 Bill Concert Series (2002–2006)
- MTV2 Dance (2002)
- Retro Videos (2002)
- Riffs & Rhymes (2002)
- Rock Countdown (2002–2006)
- Spankin' New (2002–2003)
- Greatest Hits (2003–2005)
- Headbangers Ball (2003–2012)
- Hip-Hop Show (2003–2005)
- Hits Countdown (2003–2005)
- Makes A Video (2003–2006)
- New Faces of Hip-Hop (2003–2005)
- New Faces of Rock (2003–2005)
- Spoke N'Heard (2003–2004)
- Subterranean (2003–2011)
- Subterranean UK (2003–2004)
- Track 2 (2003–2004)
- Discover & Download (2004–2010)
- Hip Hop's Toughest Rhymes (2004–2008)
- New Faces of MTV2 (2004–2005)
- Playlistism (2004–2005)
- Video Mods (2004–05)
- Your Friend, Andrew W.K. (2004)
- Hip-Hop Throwback (2005–2006)
- Rhythm and Reggaeton (2005–2006)
- Sucker Free (2005–2012)
- T-Minus Hip-Hop (2005–2006)
- T-Minus Hits (2005–2006)
- T-Minus Rock (2005–2006)
- Elite 8 (2006–2009)
- Sucker Free Countdown (2006–2012)
- The Hottest MCs in the Game (2007–2012)
- Saturday Rock the Deuce (2007–2010)
- You Rock the Deuce (2007–2017)
- MTV2 Jams (2010–2017)
- Rock n' Jock (2010)
- numbNuts (2012)
- The Week in Jams (2012–2013)
- Yo! MTV Raps Classic Cuts (2012)

==== Live-action ====
- The Wrap (2002–2003)
- America or Busted (2004)
- Dew Circuit Breakout (2004–2007)
- From Wack to Mack (2004–2007)
- Stankervision (2005–2006)
- Team Sanchez (2005–2006)
- Wildboyz (2005–2006, moved from MTV)
- The Andy Milonakis Show (2006–2007, moved from MTV)
- Final Fu (2006)
- Sportsblender (2006)
- Crank Yankers (2007 season)
- Anton & Crapbag (2008)
- Invincible (2008)
- Magical Realm (2008)
- MTV2 Legit (2009)
- School of Surf (2009)
- Ultimate Parkour Challenge (2009–2010)
- The VBS Show (2009)
- The Atom Show (2010)
- The Dudesons in America (2010, moved from MTV)
- Funk Flex Full Throttle (2010–2011)
- Fur TV (2010)
- The Ride (2010)
- Burnout: The Ultimate Drag Race Challenge (2011)
- Converse Band of Ballers (2011)
- The Dub Magazine Project (2011)
- Guy Code (2011–2015)
- Hip Hop Squares (2012)
- Nitro Circus Live (2012–2014)
- Ain't That America (2013–2014)
- Charlamagne and Friends (2013)
- Guy Court (2013)
- Mac Miller and the Most Dope Family (2013–2014)
- Wild 'n Out (2013–2016, moved to MTV)
- Jobs That Don't Suck (2014)
- Off the Bat (2014)
- Joking Off (2015–2016)
- Not Exactly News (2015)
- Binge Thinking (2016)
- 90's House (2017)
- Shinesty (2017)
- Winter Break: Hunter Mountain (2018)

==== Animated ====
- Wonder Showzen (2005–2006)
- The Adventures of Chico and Guapo (2006)
- Celebrity Deathmatch (2006–2007, moved from MTV)
- Where My Dogs At? (2006)
- Friday: The Animated Series (2007)

=== Programming from other Paramount Media Networks ===
==== CMT ====
- Trick My Truck

==== Comedy Central ====
- Awkwafina Is Nora from Queens (2020–21)
- Broad City (2021)
- Chappelle's Show (2021)
- Crank Yankers (2007, 2020–21)
- The Daily Show with Trevor Noah
- Drunk History (2020–22)
- Key & Peele
- Legends of Chamberlain Heights (2016)
- Reno 911!
- South Park (2017–22)
- Tosh.0
- Workaholics

==== Nickelodeon ====
- Drake & Josh (2016)
- Invader Zim (2006)
- Just Jordan (2016)
- Kappa Mikey (2006)
- Kenan & Kel (2016)
- The Ren & Stimpy Show (2006, 2009–2010)
- Romeo!
- SpongeBob SquarePants (2006–2007, 2021)
- Zoey 101

==== MTV ====
- 3-South (2004–2006)
- 16 & Recovering
- Advance Warning
- Æon Flux (2004)
- All Eyes On
- All-Time Top 10
- Are You the One?
- The Assignment with Iann Robinson
- Battle for Ozzfest
- Beavis and Butt-Head (2004–2006, 2009–2012, 2023)
- BIOrhythm
- Boiling Points
- Broke Ass Game Show
- Bully Beatdown
- The Busch Family Brewed
- Celebrity Deathmatch (2005–06)
- Clone High
- Damage Control
- Daria
- Deliciousness (2021)
- Diary
- Disaster Date
- Doggy Fizzle Televizzle
- Double Shot at Love
- DJ & the Fro
- Ex on the Beach
- Families of the Mafia
- Ghosted: Love Gone Missing
- Greatest Party Story Ever
- Hard Rock Live
- The Hard Times of RJ Berger
- The Head
- High School Stories
- Homewrecker
- How Far Is Tattoo Far? (2020–21)
- Jackass
- Jammed
- Jersey Shore
- Life of Ryan
- Live at the Rock and Roll Hall of Fame
- Made
- Making the Band
- Making the Game
- Making the Movie
- Making the Video
- Meet the Barkers
- The Maxx
- Movie House
- MTV News Now
- MTV Unplugged (2021)
- Next
- Nitro Circus
- One Bad Trip
- Pimp My Ride
- Popzilla (2009)
- Pranked
- The Real World
- Real World/Road Rules Challenge
- Revenge Prank
- Ridiculousness
- Rob & Big
- Rob Dyrdek's Fantasy Factory (2015)
- Run's House
- Scarred
- Senseless Acts of Video
- Sex 2K
- Siesta Key
- The Sifl and Olly Show
- Silent Library
- Spider-Man: The New Animated Series
- Teen Mom 2 (2019–21)
- Teen Mom OG (2021)
- The Osbournes
- True Life (2017–19, 2021)
- Ultrasound
- Undergrads
- Viva La Bam (2004, 2010)
- Warren the Ape
- Wildboyz
- Yo Momma

==== Paramount Network ====
- 1000 Ways to Die (2012)

==== VH1 ====
- Martha & Snoop's Potluck Dinner Party

=== Syndicated programming ===
- American Ninja Warrior
- America's Funniest Home Videos
- AST Dew Tour
- The Bernie Mac Show
- BoJack Horseman (2021)
- Boy Meets World (2012)
- Cheaters
- Cops Reloaded
- Entourage
- Everybody Hates Chris
- Family Matters
- Girlfriends
- Heat Guy J (anime series licensed from Geneon)
- In Living Color
- It's Always Sunny in Philadelphia (2016)
- Living Single
- Love and Listings
- Love Island
- Lucha Libre USA
- Malcolm & Eddie
- Malcolm in the Middle
- Martin (2011)
- Marvel Anime
- My Wife and Kids
- New Girl
- North Palm Wrestling
- The Parkers
- The PJs (2012)
- Sabrina, the Teenage Witch
- Saved by the Bell (2012)
- Scrubs
- Sister, Sister
- Smart Guy

== Special Events ==
- 24 Hours of Foo (2005)
- 24 Hours of Love (2002)
- A-Z video marathon (2000)
- Balls Out Comedy Friday (2010–present)
- Bellator Fighting Championships (2011–2013)
- Box Set Weekend (2002)
- Increase The Beat (2002)
- Jackassworld.com: 24 Hour Takeover (2008)
- Lingerie Football League (2011–2012)
- Madonna Weekend (2003)
- Most Controversial Videos (2002)
- MTV Europe Music Awards (2010–present)
- Premios MTV Latinoamérica (2002–2005)
- MTV2OONS (2004)
- Sic 'Em Friday (2005–2006)
- Sic 'Emation (2006)
- Sucker Free Summit (2010–present)
- VMA Winners (2002–2005)
