= List of festivals in North Carolina =

This is an incomplete list of festivals that take place in the state of North Carolina, and have an article on Wikipedia.

== Food ==
- Lexington Barbecue Festival
- North Carolina Potato Festival
- North Carolina Watermelon Festival
- Roanoke-Chowan Pork-Fest

== Beverage ==
- North Carolina Wine Festival
- Yadkin Valley Wine Festival

== Music ==
- Brevard Music Center
- The End of Summer Weenie Roast
- MerleFest
- Moogfest (music, art and technology, see Moog synthesizer)
- Mount Airy Fiddlers Convention
- Shakori Hills Grassroots Festival (music and dance)
- Sparkcon
- Hopscotch Music Festival

== Film ==
- 100 Words Film Festival
- ActionFest
- Full Frame Documentary Film Festival
- North Carolina Gay & Lesbian Film Festival
- National Black Theatre Festival
- North Carolina Black Film Festival
- North Carolina School of the Arts Summer Performance Festival (drama, music, dance and, film as well)
- Real to Reel International Film Festival
- RiverRun International Film Festival

== Dance ==
- American Dance Festival
- Wake Forest Dance Festival

== Art ==
- Artsplosure
- Bele Chere (defunct, music and street arts)
- Brushy Mountain Apple Festival (arts and crafts)
- Transformus (regional "Burning Man" art festival)

== Other ==
- Animazement (anime)
- Aniwave (anime)
- Apple Chill
- Carolina Renaissance Festival
- Fayetteville Dogwood Festival (musics, arts and crafts, art, educational)
- Halloween on Franklin Street
- John Canoe (influenced by the Fancy Dress Festival)
- Lake Eden Arts Festival (instructive, performing arts)
- North Carolina Azalea Festival
- North Carolina Comedy Arts Festival
- North Carolina Science Festival
- Wild Goose Festival (focuses on justice, spirituality, music and the arts)
- Woolly Worm Festival (celebrating the supposed weather-predicting abilities of the woolly worm)

== See also ==
- List of festivals in the United States
- Barbecue in North Carolina
