= Jackassworld.com: 24 Hour Takeover =

American TV special

- Genre: Comedy; Reality Television; Cringe comedy; Physical comedy; Slapstick
- Directed by: Dave Diomedi; Liz Patrick
- Starring: Johnny Knoxville; Bam Margera; Steve-O; Chris Pontius; Dave England; Wee Man; Preston Lacy; Danger Ehren
- Composer: Jeff McDonough
- Country of origin: United States
- Original language: English

Production
- Executive producers: Jeff Tremaine; Trip Taylor; Johnny Knoxville; David George
- Producer: Shanna Zablow Newton
- Production locations: New York City, U.S.
- Cinematography: Dimitry Elyashkevich
- Editor: Gregory Corwin
- Running time: 24 hours

Original release
- Network: MTV
- Release: February 23 – February 24, 2008

Related
- Jackass; Wildboyz; Viva La Bam

Jackassworld.com: 24 Hour Takeover is a 24-hour live TV special from February 23 to 24, 2008, featuring many stars of the MTV show and film franchise Jackass.

Like its predecessors, 2002's 24 Hours of Love, 2005's 24 Hours of Foo, and 2007's 24 Hours of Human Giant, the group took over the MTV studios for a 24-hour period on MTV. The takeover coincided with the launch of Jackassworld.com.

== About the broadcast ==
Beginning at noon ET on Saturday, February 23, 2008, Johnny Knoxville, Bam Margera, Wee Man, Chris Pontius, Steve-O, Dave England, Preston Lacy, and Ehren McGhehey "ran" MTV for 24 hours, broadcasting their favorite stunts, taking questions, performing new skits and stunts along with other banter and pranks. Jackass cast member Ryan Dunn did not participate, as he was suffering from depression at the time. However, archival footage of Dunn is shown. Also appearing were Mick Page and Sam Macaroni as "The Preston Lacy players", with Macaroni going on to rap with Steve-O live for Yo! MTV Raps, with a Beavis and Butt-Head clip showing the duo making fun of Steve-O's newest rap single beforehand. Also shown was a one-hour tribute to stunt man Evel Knievel, who died three months before. This event was re-broadcast on MTV2 in its entirety on March 1 and 2.

Halfway through the broadcast, Steve-O was kicked out of the MTV studios on the request of executives for his behavior and intoxication. He was allowed back in the studio a few hours later.

== Starring ==
=== Main cast ===
- Johnny Knoxville
- Bam Margera
- Steve-O
- Chris Pontius
- Wee Man
- Dave England
- Preston Lacy
- Ehren McGhehey

=== Guest appearances ===
- Loomis Fall
- April Margera, Phil Margera, and Jess Margera
- Missy Rothstein
- Manny Puig
- Dave Carnie
- Mat Hoffman
- Mike Carroll
- Rick Howard
- Zach Galifianakis
- Sam Macaroni

=== Film crew members who appear on screen ===
- Director, producer, and co-creator Jeff Tremaine
- Co-producer and cinematographer Dimitry Elyashkevich
- Co-producer and main photographer Sean Cliver
- Cameramen Rick Kosick, Lance Bangs, and Joe Frantz
- Photographer Ben "Benzo" Kaller
- Art directors J.P. Blackmon, and Scott Manning
- Editor Frank Hansen

== International broadcast ==
MTV Asia aired the highlights of Jackassworld.com: 24 Hour Takeover on May 21, 2014.

== See also ==
- 24 Hours of Foo
- 24 Hours of Love
- 24 Hour of Human Giant
