= Ahanchian v. Xenon Pictures, Inc. =

2010 American court case

Ahanchian vs. Xenon Pictures, Inc.
- Court: United States Court of Appeals for the Ninth Circuit
- Full case name: Amir Cyrus Ahanchian v. Xenon Pictures, Inc.
- Decided: November 3, 2010
- Citation: 403 F. App'x 166 (2010)

Court membership
- Judges sitting: Andrew Kleinfeld, Kim McLane Wardlaw, Consuelo Callahan

Case opinions
- Copyright may be infringed when total concept and feel is the same
- Decision by: Kleinfeld
- Dissent: Wardlaw

Keywords
- Copyright infringement

Ahanchian v. Xenon Pictures, Inc., 403 F. App'x 166 (9th Cir. 2010), was a United States Court of Appeals for the Ninth Circuit case involving the disputed authorship of a number of skits which appeared in the movie National Lampoon's TV: The Movie, released in November 2006 in the United States, which starred Steve-O, Preston Lacy, Jason "Wee Man" Acuña, Chris Pontius, Clifton Collins Jr., Danny Trejo, Jacob Vargas, Judd Nelson, Jason Mewes, Tony Cox, and Eugenio Derbez. The movie was directed by Sam Maccarone, and written by Cyrus Ahanchian, Steve-O, Preston Lacey, and Sam Macarone. In 2010, by reversing the original decision, the Ninth Circuit Court of Appeals used filmmaker Ahanchian's legal victory to enjoin lawyers everywhere in the United States with the right to take vacation time before a trial ends as a professional civility. Afterwards, in December 2010, LexisNexis ranked Ahanchian's copyright legal win as both the #2 and the #3 Copyright Cases of 2010. As of June 29, 2022, Ahanchian V Xenon has been cited in over 537 federal cases in the USA or an average of four times per month.

== Background ==
In September 2007, after working as a screenwriter on the feature film National Lampoon's TV: The Movie, Amir Cyrus Ahanchian filed a case for breach of an implied contract, copyright infringement, and unfair competition in violation of the Lanham Act against distributor Xenon Pictures, Inc., producer CKrush, Inc., director and writer Sam Maccarone, and Preston Lacy, a writer and actor in the film.

== District court decision ==
The district court abused its judicial discretion in denying request for a one-week extension requested by Ahanchian's side to file his opposition and failed in denying Ahanchian's motion to allow a three-day late-filed opposition it construed as a Rule 60(b) motion. The district judge also applied an incorrect standard in reviewing the late-filed request under FRCP 60(b), all the more so given that the late filing was only three days after the very short seven day deadline under United States District Court for the Central District of California local rules. Accordingly, 9th Circuit Court of Appeals reversed the district court's grant of summary judgment, vacated the district court's award of attorneys' fees, and remanded the case for further proceedings. The district court also stated that the denial was, in the alternative, based on a lack of Good cause. This conclusion was also an abuse of discretion, per court's decision.

== Results ==
As a result of his legal victory in the 9th Circuit Court of Appeals, LexisNexis ranked Ahanchian's copyright victory as both the #2 and #3 Copyright Laws of November 2010, when two new Case Laws were established in the American legal system:

1. Because the author clearly demonstrated the "good cause" required by Fed. R. Civ. P. 6, and because there was no reason to believe that the author was acting in bad faith or was misrepresenting his reasons for asking for the extension, the district court abused its discretion in denying the author's timely motion for an extension.

2. As a collection of independent skits, a movie was a collective work under 17 U.S.C.S. § 101, with distinct copyrights for each skit under 17 U.S.C.S. § 201(c), and since an author testified producers stated only yes, no, or go back to it when he read them his skits, joint authorship was not shown; summary judgment to the producers was reversed.

— Copyright & Trademark Law Community Staff, "Intellectual Property - Top Cases", LexisNexis (3 December 2010)

The Good Cause Law of Civility ensures that Cases are tried upon their merits. There is a four-factor equitable test to determine excusable neglect. Under Federal Rule of Civil Procedure - Title VI, when an "act may or must be done within a specified time, the court may, for good cause, extend the time on motion made after the time has expired if the party failed to act because of excusable neglect".

To determine whether a party's failure to meet a deadline constitutes "excusable neglect", the Court "must apply a four-factor equitable test, examining:

1. The danger of prejudice to the opposing party;
2. The length of the delay and its potential impact on the proceedings;
3. The reason for the delay; and
4. Whether the movant acted in good faith.

== See also ==
- Joint authorship
