= The Robot Johnson Show =

The Robot Johnson Show is a weekly sketch comedy show put together by the members of Robot Johnson, based out of Charlotte, North Carolina. The show format consists of sketches, commercial and song parodies and original comedy songs, and lasts roughly an hour and ten minutes. Founded by Sean Keenan and A. Blaine Miller, two original members of Charlotte stalwart comedy group The Perch, Robot Johnson is made up of Perch alumni along with local actors and comedians. Relying on local humor and pushing the envelope on racial, sexual and political issues, Robot Johnson claims to provide "good humor by bad people."

== History ==
The initial concept for The Robot Johnson Show came out of a series of conversations Keenan had with Douglas Young, Director of Theatrical Programming of the North Carolina Blumenthal Performing Arts Center, of which Spirit Square is a part. Given the previous success of The Perch (which had folded in 2006 after eleven years of performing in Charlotte) and Keenan's national notoriety as the voice and puppeteer of MTV2 character The Talking Baby, Young thought that the time was right to start a new sketch comedy troupe in the city. Although initially reluctant to get involved, Keenan eventually agreed, calling Miller to gauge interest in the foundation of a new group. The Robot Johnson Show debuted in the Charlotte Comedy Theatre on December 7, 2007, with its first show including favorites like "Quay Rogers: Surrogate Black Guy," "Of Maple Leaves and Human Suffering," and "The Incredibly Sad Indian."

== Present ==
Currently, Robot Johnson is performing at Wine Up in Charlotte, NC and is a touring company across both North and South Carolina.

== Cast ==
The current cast and writing staff of The Robot Johnson Show is as follows:

- Sean Keenan, producer and co-founder
- Candice Cortinas, associate producer
- Tiffany Apple, performer
- David Golden, writer/performer
- Graham Odom, writer/performer
- Noah Lemmons, writer/performer
- Zaq Rogers, performer
- Meghan Lowther, writer/performer
- Brandon Ballard, writer/performer
- Luci Wilson, performer
- Drew Aronica, performer/writer
- Field Canty, performer
- Ryan Stamey, performer
- Tania Kelly, writer/performer
- Josh Lanier, writer
- Andy Rogers, writer

== Recurring characters ==
- Gordon, the Marginalized Redneck (Sean Keenan)
- Becca Norwood, Channel 5 reporter (Tiffany Apple)
- Paula and Skalene, the "Double Wide" girls (Tiffany Apple and Luci Wilson)
- Gene Shalit (Brandon Ballard)
- The Talking Baby (Sean Keenan)
- Disembodied Voice (Graham Odom)
- Gene and Monty, two '40s-era movie execs (David Golden and Zaq Rogers)
- The Guardian Pancake (Sean Keenan)
- Kelly Hornsby (Luci Wilson)
- Dr. A**hole (Zaq Rogers)
- Drs. Howell, Utley, Cornwallis, and Patricks, the redneck NASA rocket scientists (Luci Wilson, David Golden, Tiffany Apple, and Graham Odom)
- Shelby Gerkin (Meghan Lowther)

== The Talking Baby ==
The Talking Baby is described by creator Sean Keenan as an "R-rated puppet show," though the baby in question is not actually a puppet but rather an anatomically correct baby doll. During the Talking Baby segments, audience members are able to see Keenan's hand as he operates the baby, changing its hand positions and turning its head. The ostensible function of Talking Baby is to review movies, but the character often goes off on tangents about characters, actors, directors or concepts involved in the movie and quite often has not seen the movies he reviews. The Talking Baby segment is the raunchiest and most profanity-laden of each show, with the Baby promising to "clean it up" for children and the elderly before descending into a tirade of obscenity. One of the most popular sketches in the show, Talking Baby was eventually made the spokesman for MTV2 in the early 2000s. The sketch typically starts out with Disembodied Voice paraphrasing a pop song to introduce the baby (one segment featured Disembodied Voice singing the entire first verse to "More Than Words" by Extreme) before introducing the first film to be reviewed.

== Partnerships and media appearances ==
At their July 26 shows, Robot Johnson filmed a national 30-minute pilot. As of February 2009, the pilot is in post-production and there are plans to shop it to two major networks as well as smaller cable stations. Robot Johnson recently launched its own YouTube channel and plans are in the works for a national tour as well as a comedy album.

In September 2008, the troupe partnered with Collaborative Arts Theatre to produce SITCOMS LIVE, which featured three weeks of three separate sitcoms from the latter half of the twentieth century, including episodes of "Three's Company," "The Facts of Life," and "Married... With Children." Robot Johnson performed the commercial breaks for each sitcom, along with a new hour-long sketch comedy show after each performance. The following year, The Robot Johnson Show received the Metrolina Theatre Award (MTA) for "Other Exemplary Performance/Element - Comedy" for its contribution to SITCOMS LIVE.

On September 21, 2008, Robot Johnson announced that they would move back into The Charlotte Comedy Theatre in October of that year to begin workshopping shows for 2009.

In February 2009, Robot Johnson partnered with Charlotte photography museum The Light Factory to promote "American Zombie," a citywide festival devoted to the work of director George A. Romero. Cast members Sean Keenan, Zaq Rogers and Tiffany Apple appeared on "Wilson's World" segments of local news program "Fox News Rising" on opposite sides of the zombie-rights argument in order to promote the event.

September 2009 saw Robot Johnson's first musical releases. The troupe released free promotional CDs at performances at the Carolina Actors Studio Theatre in Charlotte, NC and at The Gathering Spot in Greenville, SC. The promo CD singles featured members of the troupe performing parodies of "Here Comes the Sun" by The Beatles, "The Times They Are a-Changin'" by Bob Dylan, "Islands in the Stream" by Dolly Parton and Kenny Rogers, and "Disarm" by The Smashing Pumpkins. Also in September 2009, troupe member David Golden released his debut album, "Here's What I Really Think of You," featuring songs he had written for the troupe.

In January 2010, Robot Johnson began a year-long run of monthly shows at the CAST Theatre.

On February 4, 2010, Robot Johnson performed at the North Carolina Comedy Arts Festival.
