= Joint authorship =

Co-creation of a copyrighted work

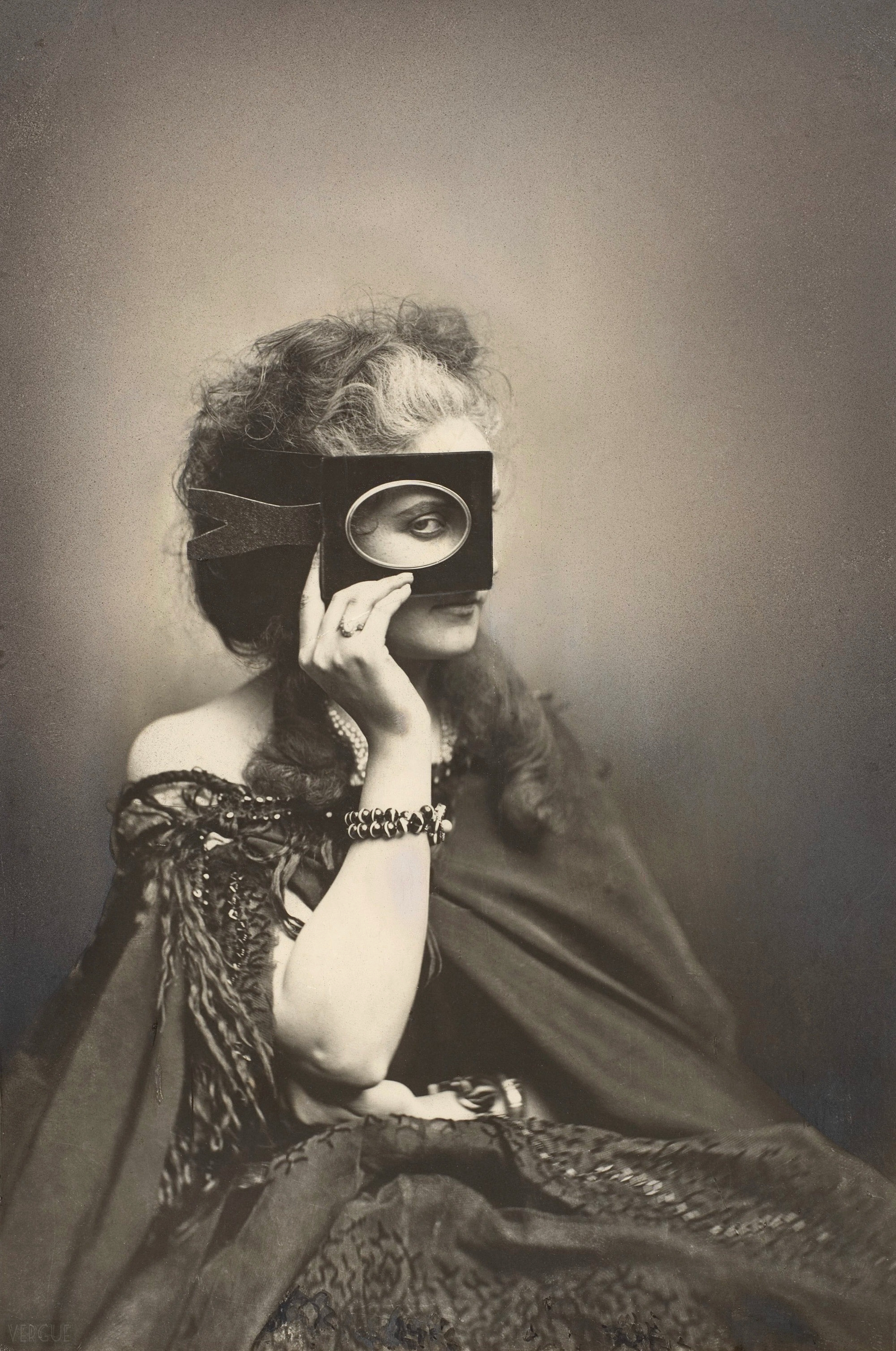
The Countess of Castiglione collaborating on her portrait shoot, photographed by Pierre-Louis Pierson, in the 1860s

Joint authorship of a copyrightable work is when two or more persons contribute enough to the work to be the author of that work. In the case of joint authorship, the authors share the copyright in the work with each other.

== International conventions ==
Article 7bis of the Berne Convention states the term of protection for works of joint authorship and extends the general terms of protection provided under Article 7 to works of joint authorship, under the condition that the term of copyright protection must be measured from the death of the last surviving author. But the Berne Convention doesn't define what works of joint authorship are, because various national legislations have a lot of variations while defining the same, and have a different approach to the topic.

This problem relating to joint authorship is not specifically dealt with by other international agreements as well, like the UCC, TRIPS, and the WIPO Copyright Treaty 1996.

== Law in the United States ==
A joint work is defined in Section 101 of the U.S. Copyright Act as "a work prepared by two or more authors with the intention that their contributions be merged into inseparable or interdependent parts of a unitary whole". Section 201(a) gives the status of co-ownership in the copyrighted work to such authors of a joint work.

=== Elements ===
Under the US copyright law, individuals must prove the following two things for claiming joint authorship in a work:

1. First, they must show that they have made a copyrightable contribution to the final work at issue.
2. Second, they must show that all of these contributors intended that their various contributions be merged into a unitary whole.

==== Copyrightable contribution ====
The individual contributions made by authors to a joint work need not necessarily be equal in quality or quantity. Nevertheless, the author has to show that his contribution to the joint work is copyrightable by itself. A contribution of mere ideas is not sufficient. To be a joint author, one must contribute expression. For the expression to be copyrightable it has to be original – that is independently created and possess at least a minimal degree of creativity.

However, in Gaiman v. McFarlane, where the issue of joint authorship was on the creation of new characters for an existing comic series, the court held that there will be joint-authorship even though the author's contribution was not independently copyrightable. The reasoning given behind this was that if more than one person laboured to create a single copyrightable work, then it would be paradoxical if no one was able to claim copyright because the individual contributions were not themselves copyrightable. While in this case, recent decisions holding that individual contribution must be independently copyrightable were not explicitly overruled, they were distinguished on facts. It was also observed that the lower standard for joint authorship only applies to mixed media works.

==== Intention to be merged into a unitary whole ====
The core of joint authorship is joint labouring by two or more persons to complete a pre-concerted common design. In the absence of a pre-concerted common design, the completed work will not be regarded as a joint work. However, it is not required of the several authors that they must necessarily work in physical propinquity or in concert. In Edward B. Marks Music Corp. v. Jerry Vogel Music Co, the court held that while producing a musical composition jointly, two men will be coauthors and owners of the copyright even if they labour at different times, without consulting each other, and remain strangers to each other. It is a work of joint authorship if a person creates lyrics or music with the intention that his work shall be combined with the work of another person who shall create the music or write the lyrics, as the case may be, so as to make the composition complete.

The touchstone here is the intention, at the time the writing is done, that the parts be absorbed or combined into an integrated unit, although the parts themselves may be either "inseparable" (as the case of a novel or painting) or "interdependent" (as in the case of a motion picture, opera, or the words and music of a song). Hence, joint authors must have the intention of combining their respective works at the time of creating the work, and not at some later date.

However, they are not required to have an express collaboration agreement creating a joint-author relationship.

There have also been situations wherein the parties shared a pre-concerted intent that their works be merged into one, and yet the court did not grant joint authorship. This was since all the participants in a work did not consider themselves or others to be joint authors.

=== Relevant cases ===
==== Ahanchian vs. Xenon Pictures, Inc. ====
After working as a screenwriter on the feature film, National Lampoon's TV: The Movie, Amir Cyrus Ahanchian filed a case for breach of an implied contract, copyright infringement, and unfair competition in violation of the Lanham Act against distributor Xenon Pictures, Inc., producer CKrush, Inc., director and writer Sam Maccarone, and Preston Lacy, a writer and actor in the film. As a result of his legal victory in the 9th Circuit Court of Appeals, LexisNexis ranked Ahanchian's copyright victory as both the No. 2 and No. 3 Copyright Laws of November 2010, when two new Case Laws were established in the American legal system:

1. Because the author clearly demonstrated the "good cause" required by Fed. R. Civ. P. 6, and because there was no reason to believe that the author was acting in bad faith or was misrepresenting his reasons for asking for the extension, the district court abused its discretion in denying the author's timely motion for an extension.

2. As a collection of independent skits, a movie was a collective work under 17 U.S.C.S. § 101, with distinct copyrights for each skit under 17 U.S.C.S. § 201(c), and since an author testified producers stated only yes, no, or go back to it when he read them his skits, joint authorship was not shown; summary judgment to the producers was reversed.

— Copyright & Trademark Law Community Staff, "Intellectual Property – Top Cases", LexisNexis (3 December 2010)

==== Childress v. Taylor ====
In Childress v. Taylor, actress Clarice Taylor asked playwright Alice Childress to write a play about legendary comedienne Jackie "Moms" Mabley. While writing, Childress accepted Taylor's assistance. Taylor mainly contributed ideas regarding the portrayal of characters in the play and also provided research on the life of "Moms" Mabley. On finalization of the draft, Childress rejected that it was owned equally by her and Taylor and registered the same in her name. Later, Taylor took a copy of the play and produced it at another theatre without Childress' permission. As a response to a suit for infringement by Childress, Taylor claimed that she was a joint author of the script and hence had equal rights in it. The Court while determining this issue, looked at whether the two participants intended to combine their works into a unitary whole. Additionally, the court checked whether the parties 'intended to be joint authors' in the work. The court held that Taylor was not a joint author of the script due to lack of contribution of sufficient expression. It observed that no evidence was shown to establish Taylor's role as anything more than giving advice and ideas.

==== Thomson v. Larson ====
In another case wherein both the participants had contributed expression, the court denied joint authorship status due to lack of requisite intent. Thomson v. Larson revolved around the claims to co-authorship of the musical Rent made by a dramaturge. In this particular case, Jonathan Larson, the author, had written the original play and was having it produced by the New York Theatre Workshop ("NYTW"). Lynn Thomson, who was a literature professor at New York University, was hired to help shape and form the plot. The NYTW and Thomson entered into an agreement the terms of which stated that Thomson was to be listed as 'dramaturge' for billing purposes as an independent contractor.

However, not long after the dress rehearsal, Larson died and Thomson filled in his shoes and concluded the book to be used for the musical. At this stage, Thomson was yet to sign a waiver which would entail her handing over any copyright interest in the concluded work. Notwithstanding the fact that Thomson had a significant contribution in portions that could be copyrighted to the result, the court held that Rent was not the product of joint work and as such Thomson could not claim the status of co-author. The argument furthered in this regard was that there was a lack of expression of an indication on behalf of Larson which would indicate that it was ever his intention for Thomson to be a joint author. Instead, his intention as expressed characterized her capacity as an editor of his original work. The court reiterated the precedent established by Childress, rejecting Thomson's argument that the requirement of intention needs to be met with only in a situation where an author's contributions are minimal.

The court held that to be characterized as a joint author, an individual must show two things: first, that he or she produced independent copyright material within the context of the creative process and second, that both individual authors exhibited mutual intent to create the joint work. However, the court argued that, despite Thomson's significant contribution to the development of Rent, Thomson's claim was without a clear demonstration that Larson knowingly intended to share the playwright credit with her and hence Thomson would not qualify as a joint author.

=== Difference from collective work ===
In the case of a collective work, defined in Section 101, separate and independent works are assembled into a collection, and while the independent works may have a copyright protection, the nature of copyright protection of the collection is different from that of the independent works. The collective work exists as a distinct entity, other than the individual works that form the collection. Therefore, the key characteristics are assemblage or collection of "separate and independent works into a collective whole".

Unlike a work of joint authorship, a collective work such as periodicals lacks the elements of unity and merger.

=== Difference from derivative work ===
The definition of "joint works" has led to some concern that when a previously written work such as a play, novel or music is incorporated in a future work such as a motion picture, the authors of such previous works could claim to be the coauthors of the motion picture. It is usually true that a motion picture would be a joint work and not a collective work with respect to the authors actually working on the film, but the usual status of "employees for hire" given to them would not let the question of co-ownership come up. Although an author such as a songwriter or novelist may write a work hoping and expecting that his work will be used in a motion picture, it will still be a work of independent authorship because the author did not write the work with the intention of it being used in the motion picture. In such a case, the motion picture will be a derivative work, and Section 103 makes it amply clear that copyright in a derivative work is independent of, and does not affect the extent of any rights in any pre-existing works incorporated in the said derivative work.

=== Economic effect ===
In the case of joint authorship, each author is the owner of not only the part he or she created but of the whole work. Every author can freely use the work and license it out for others to use it. A co-owner of a work of joint authorship does not require other authors' permission to use the work himself, and the other authors can not object to such a use.

If the license has been granted by one of the joint authors unilaterally, then the license fee collected, if any, must be shared appropriately with other joint authors. In the absence of an agreement determining how the license fee is to be shared, every joint author must receive an equal share irrespective of the amount of their individual contribution to the joint work. A joint author can sign a written statement in compliance with Section 204(a) to alter his ownership shares he is initially vested with.

A joint author may also sue any third party for copyright infringement without asking other co-owners to join the litigation.

Moreover, a joint author does not require other joint authors' consent to transfer his exclusive proportional interest in the work. However, a joint author cannot transfer all interest in the work without obtaining authorization from other co-owners, since that would result in "an involuntary transfer of the other joint owners' undivided interest in the whole".

The interest of a joint author in a work of joint authorship is passed on to his heirs after his death, and not the other joint authors. Hence, in this regard, joint authorship in copyright law is similar to tenancy in common in property law and not a joint tenancy.

== Law in India ==
Indian copyright law defines 'work of joint authorship' in Section 2(z) of the Indian Copyright Act, 1957 as "a work produced by the collaboration of two or more authors in which the contribution of one author is not distinct from the contribution of the other author or authors". The term of copyright protection in case of joint authorship is calculated from the death of the last author, which is sixty years post the death of the last author.

=== Relevant case ===
The leading case of joint authorship in India is Najma Heptulla v. Orient Longman Ltd. and Ors. In this case, the plaintiff is the legal heir of the author of the book India Wins Freedom. The defendant is the publisher of said book. The defendant entered into an agreement with one Prof. Humayun Kabir to make contents of the book known to the public. The plaintiff obtained an injunction restraining defendants from breaking seals of covers of the complete book India Wins Freedom and from making its contents known to the public. According to the preface to the said book written by Kabir, Maulana Azad used to describe his experiences in Urdu, on the basis of which a draft in English would be prepared by Kabir. The court held that active and close intellectual collaboration and cooperation between Maulana Azad implied that Kabir is a joint author of the book with Maulana Azad. Hence, the defendants were allowed to break the seals of the covers of the complete book India Wins Freedom and make its contents known to the public.

== See also ==
- Author
- Collaborative writing
- Copyright
- Copyright law of India
- Copyright law of the United States
