= Ryan Simonetti =

American skateboarder

Personal information
- Born: January 26, 1976 (age 50) Great Falls, Montana, US
- Years active: 1994–present

Sport
- Country: United States
- Sport: Skateboarding

Ryan Andrew Simonetti is an American professional skateboarder who has appeared in several television programs. He has appeared in National Lampoon's TV: The Movie, Wildboyz, Dr. Steve-O, and Don't Try This At Home: The Steve-O Video. He has appeared on MTV Cribs in their Jackass episode special. On May 15, 2008, he appeared on the Late Show with David Letterman, where he jumped onto and off a moving U-Haul truck.

== Early life ==
Ryan Andrew Simonetti was born January 26, 1976 at the Deconis Hospital and raised in Great Falls, Montana. He was conceived in Fairfield, California to parents natives of California, with the pair moving to Montana shortly before his birth.

The first four years of Simonetti's childhood were spent living with his family on their farm north of Great Falls, before moving back to Great Falls when he was five years old. He graduated from Great Falls High School in 1994.

== TV, film, and DVD releases ==
TV

- Jackass (MTV, 2000–2002)
- MTV Cribs (2002)
- Wildboyz (MTV, 1 episode, 2006)
- 2006 Teen Choice Awards (TV special, 2006)
- Dr. Steve-O (USA Network, 2007)
- Late Show with David Letterman (1 episode, 2008)
- Steve-O: Demise and Rise (MTV special, 2009)
- Steve-O: Guilty As Charged (comedy special, 2016)

Movies

- The Dudesons Movie (Cameo, 2005)
- National Lampoon's TV: The Movie (2007)
- Pinneration the Movie (2008)

DVDs

- Don't Try This At Home – The Steve-O Video Vol. 1 (2001)
- Don't Try This At Home – The Steve-O Video Vol. 2: The Tour (2002)
- Steve-O: Out on Bail (2003) (aka Don't Try This At Home – The Steve-O Video Vol. 3: Out on Bail)
