= Cockeyed =

Cockeyed may refer to:

- Crooked or askew; not level
- An eye alignment disorder, Strabismus
- A website, Cockeyed.com
- Louis Fratto (1907-1967), American labor racketeer and organized crime figure nicknamed "Cock-eyed"
