= April Richardson =

American comedian (b. 1979)

- Born: April Marie Richardson; May 1, 1979 (age 47); Savannah, Georgia, U.S.

Comedy career
- Years active: 2013-2021
- Medium: Stand-up
- Website: http://www.aprilrichardson.com

April Richardson (born May 1, 1979) is an American stand-up comedian. She was a round table regular on the television show Chelsea Lately and a frequent contestant on @midnight. She is from Atlanta, Georgia.

== Early life ==
Richardson was born in Savannah, Georgia. She spent several years in Manchester, England. She graduated from Lassiter High School in Marietta, Georgia in 1997. She is an alumna of Georgia State University.

== Stand-up comedy ==
Richardson has performed at the Bridgetown Comedy Festival, SF Sketchfest, Aspen Laff Festival, Bumbershoot Music & Arts Festival, North Carolina Comedy Arts Festival, Boston's Women In Comedy Festival, and performs regularly in Los Angeles. She has toured with Chris Hardwick, Rob Delaney, Jimmy Pardo, Dana Gould, and Matt Braunger.

== Television ==
Richardson co-hosted TruTV's Almost Genius with Chris Fairbanks. She appeared regularly on Chelsea Lately, and on Fuel TV's The Daily Habit.

== Podcasts ==
Richardson created and hosts a podcast called Go Bayside—a Saved by the Bell podcast in which she invites a friend (usually a fellow comedian) over to her apartment to watch an episode and critically deconstruct it. As of September 15, 2015, there have been 85 episodes. The final 2 episodes were of her and her friend, Millie De Chirico, talking about the TV movie Saved by the Bell: Hawaiian Style and her and comedian Paul F. Tompkins talking about Saved by the Bell: Wedding in Las Vegas.

In November 2013, April joined Pat Francis's Rock Solid Podcast as a rotating co-host. Richardson appeared on the show until 2018 logging in over 30 appearances as co-host.

In October 2017, April and best friend Millie De Chirico started the podcast Sordid Details, where they "get to the heart of matters of least importance," including the black market, fast food favorites, mom clothes, and Huey Lewis. The podcast concluded when Richardson moved to England.
