= Converse Band of Ballers =

- Country of origin: United States

Original release
- Network: MTV2
- Release: August 22, 2011

Converse Band of Ballers is a celebrity 3-on-3 basketball tournament on MTV2. The tournament features some of the biggest names in hip-hop and music. Teams compete for a chance to win the "Golden Speaker Trophy". The 2011 Converse Band of Ballers was hosted by MTV News correspondent Sway, with play-by-play commentary by Bobbito Garcia, and music provided by DJ D-Nice. Challengers for the 2011 title were teams assembled by YMCMB, Matt & Kim, Wiz Khalifa, Chiddy Bang and 2-time defending champion Jim Jones.
