= Almost Genius =

- Genre: Comedy; Satire; Reality
- Presented by: April Richardson & Chris Fairbanks
- Country of origin: United States
- Original language: English
- No. of seasons: 1
- No. of episodes: 24

Production
- Running time: 30 minutes (including commercials)

Original release
- Network: truTV
- Release: December 29, 2015 – July 18, 2016

Related
- truTV Presents: World's Dumbest...

Almost Genius is an American cable television series that premiered December 29, 2015 and ended July 18, 2016 on truTV.

== About ==
Almost Genius is a half-hour viral video clip show, hosted by comedians April Richardson and Chris Fairbanks. Like the network's previous longtime staple World's Dumbest, the show also involves a cast of comedians (some of them also from World's Dumbest) giving humorous commentary on videos of people, places, and things that try hard to succeed, but fall just a little short. However, unlike World's Dumbest, instead of mocking the subjects, the commentators congratulate them for their bravery and ingenuity. The show is produced by Meetinghouse Productions, the same company that also produced World's Dumbest.

== Episodes ==
=== Season 1 (2015–2016) ===
| No. | Title | Original release date | Viewers (millions) |
|---|---|---|---|
| 1 | "Pilot" | December 29, 2015 | 0.40 |
| 2 | "Missed it by that Much" | January 5, 2016 | 0.42 |
| 3 | "A Day Late & a Dollar Short" | January 12, 2016 | 0.38 |
| 4 | "Desperately Seeking Super" | January 19, 2016 | 0.28 |
| 5 | "'A' for Effort" | January 26, 2016 | 0.31 |
| 6 | "Daring the Universe" | February 2, 2016 | N/A |
| 7 | "Flying too Close to the Sun" | February 9, 2016 | 0.23 |
| 8 | "Standing Ovation" | February 16, 2016 | 0.36 |
| 9 | "Yes You Can!" | February 23, 2016 | 0.28 |
| 10 | "We're #2" | March 1, 2016 | 0.31 |
| 11 | "Close, but No Cigar" | March 8, 2016 | 0.29 |
| 12 | "Sports Edition" | March 22, 2016 | 0.30 |
| 13 | "Digging Deep" | May 16, 2016 | 0.30 |
| 14 | "Hardly Working" | May 23, 2016 | 0.25 |
| 15 | "Falling Short" | May 30, 2016 | 0.26 |
| 16 | "There it Isn't" | June 6, 2016 | 0.32 |
| 17 | "No Cigar" | June 13, 2016 | 0.23 |
| 18 | "Flying Low" | June 20, 2016 | 0.26 |
| 19 | "So Close Yet So Far" | June 27, 2016 | 0.28 |
| 20 | "If at First You Don't Succeed" | July 4, 2016 | 0.24 |
| 21 | "Half Baked" | July 11, 2016 | 0.26 |
| 22 | "Spectacular Defeat" | July 11, 2016 | 0.20 |
| 23 | "Go for the Gold" | July 18, 2016 | 0.30 |
| 24 | "Down but Not Out" | July 18, 2016 | 0.26 |
