= Fayetteville Dogwood Festival =

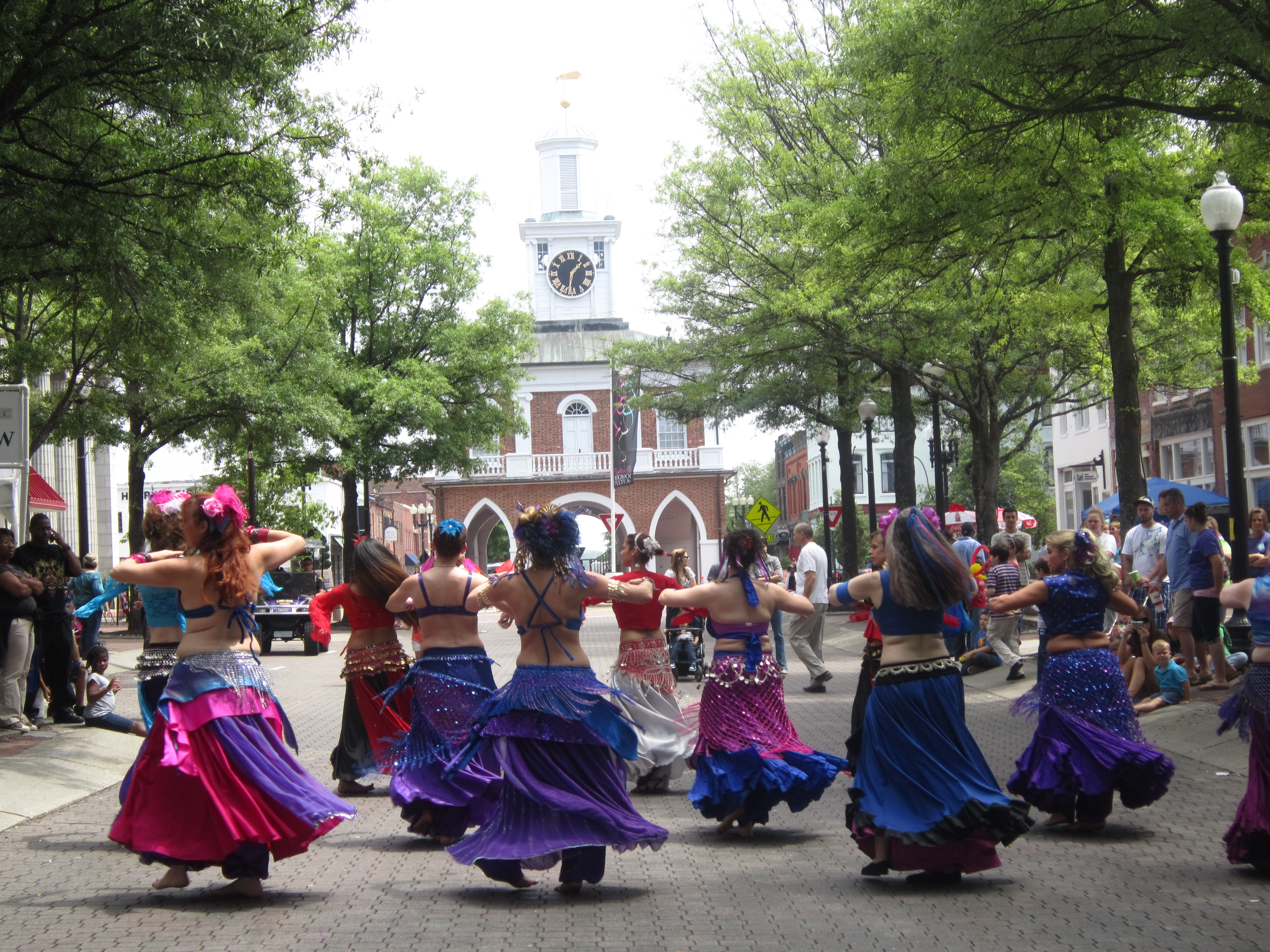
Dancers at Fayetteville Dogwood Festival

The Fayetteville Dogwood Festival in an annual three day festival in Fayetteville, North Carolina, celebrated on the 4th weekend in April. Events including music from both national and local musicians, arts and crafts, various artists and educational resources for children. The Festival began in 1982 due to the efforts of then mayor Bill Hurley, John Malzone, and others. 2017 was the largest festival to date, bringing in over 250,000 visitors.

2020 saw the festival go on hiatus, after trying to reschedule to October caused by COVID-19 pandemic.

== Activities ==
The event itself is free to the public and covers much of Historic Downtown Fayetteville and Festival Park. The festival has expanded over the years to include nearby streets. Both beer and wine are served within the festival footprint.

== See also ==
- List of festivals in North Carolina
