= Dr. Steve-O =

- Genre: Reality
- Created by: Steve-O
- Directed by: Kara Udell; Danielle Gauffre; Joe Guidry
- Presented by: Steve-O
- Starring: Trishelle Cannatella; Jessica Landon; Norma Jean Riddick; Reggie Pace
- Country of origin: United States
- Original language: English
- No. of seasons: 1
- No. of episodes: 7

Production
- Executive producers: Steve-O; Jonathan Murray; Jeff Jenkins; Gil Goldschein
- Producers: Angelo Liao; Scott Paskoff; Diana Gonzales-Johnson; Nick Cavazos; Thea Regan; Tim Hedberg
- Editor: Damien Michael Belliveau
- Running time: 18–22 minutes
- Production company: Bunim/Murray Productions

Original release
- Network: USA Network
- Release: October 1 – November 12, 2007

Related
- Jackass

Dr. Steve-O is an American reality television series starring Steve-O, Trishelle Cannatella, and Reggie Pace. The show premiered on October 1, 2007; it aired Monday nights at 11:05 pm Eastern/10:05 pm Central, immediately after WWE Raw, on the USA Network. The show ended on November 12, 2007.

== Plot ==
Dr. Steve-O was a reality TV show where Steve-O acts as a doctor, to help males overcome their fears, thus the headline created by Steve-O, "Turning wussies into men." In every episode, Dr. Steve-O helps three different men, and makes them complete three challenges to overcome their fears.

== Format ==
The show begins with Dr. Steve-O riding in a customized ambulance along with his driver (Reggie) and nurse (Trishelle), showing the viewers videos sent in by men who want to overcome their fear. They then go to the subject's home and complete the first challenge, then they pick them up and go to another location for another challenge. Dr. Steve-O follows a checklist for the overcoming of a wussy's fears.

If someone decides that a challenge is too embarrassing for them, they can simply walk away and risk being called a "wuss". People who complete the process are awarded clean bills of health by Steve-O, who usually staples them onto the recipients.

== List of episodes ==
- Note: In the scores column, the results are listed as "task:status".
  - 1 = Initiation Treatment
  - 2 = Personal Procedure
  - 3 = Group Therapy
  - P = Passed
  - F = Failed

=== Episode 1 ===
- Aired: October 1, 2007
- Group Therapy: Butt Glide on Ice in Briefs with Sneaux Shoes While Hanging from a Zamboni.
- Special Guest(s): Ryan Simonetti, pro skateboarder

Patient, Age	Hometown	Diagnosis	Initiation Treatment	Personal Procedure	Scores	Final Status
Jace Hidalgo, 22	Lake Charles, Louisiana	Fear of Bees; No Confidence	Eyebrow Wax	Bee Suit	1:P / 2:P / 3:P	Cured
Michael Garcia, 22	Carson, California	Fear of Speaking in Public	Talk to Crowd	Stand-Up Comedy	1:P / 2:P / 3:P	Cured
Jordan Lee, 26	Unknown	Fear of Meat on the Bone	Bite Chicken Head	Turkey Boxing	1:P / 2:P / 3:F	Terminal

=== Episode 2 ===
- Aired: October 8, 2007
- Group Therapy: Walk on Broken Glass and Swallow Goldfish.
- Special Guest(s): None

Patient, Age	Hometown	Diagnosis	Initiation Treatment	Personal Procedure	Scores	Final Status
Kris Huelgas, 21	Glendale, California	Overweight	Get Rid of Hair	IV Skating	1:P / 2:P / 3:P	Cured
Pedro Noriega, 24	Pachuca, Hidalgo, Mexico	Afraid of Heights	Throw Off Crane	Rappel Off Building	1:P / 2:P / 3:P	Cured
David Markham, 32	East Hampton, Connecticut	Uptight & Lonely	Get Butt Whipped	Bar Tricks for Lesbians	1:P / 2:P / 3:P	Cured

=== Episode 3 ===
- Aired: October 15, 2007
- Group Therapy: "Fart Art"
- Special Guest(s): None

Patient, Age	Hometown	Diagnosis	Initiation Treatment	Personal Procedure	Scores	Final Status
Jesse Harley, 27	N/A	Lacks Confidence	Naked Aerobics	Get a Tough-Guy Tattoo	1:P / 2:P / 3:P	Cured
Devin Bryant, 19 (a.k.a. D-nice)	N/A	Perceived as a Boy	Remove Braces	Fall Down & Get Back Up	1:P / 2:P / 3:F	Terminal
Baldwin Yen, 28 (a.k.a. Bobby)	West Hollywood, California	Fear of Strangers	Get Help from Strangers	Stagedive Into Crowd	1:P / 2:P / 3:P	Cured

=== Episode 4 ===
- Aired: October 22, 2007
- Group Therapy: Make Tea Cups out of Testicle Molds.
- Special Guest(s): Marcelle*, 61, Claudia*, 63 and Samantha**, virgin stripper

Patient, Age	Hometown	Diagnosis	Initiation Treatment	Personal Procedure	Scores	Final Status
Josh Rosenthal, 26	N/A	Never Been Kissed	*Granny Makeout	**Virgin Strip	1:P / 2:P / 3:P	Cured
Michael Schamber, 21	N/A	Social Recluse	Ding Dong Diarrhea	Hamburgling	1:P / 2:P / 3:P	Cured
Brian Sinclair, 27	N/A	Lacks Machismo	Burn Scar	Fire Blowing	1:P / 2:P / 3:P	Cured

=== Episode 5 ===
- Aired: October 29, 2007
- Group Therapy: Walk the Streets Naked.
- Special Guest(s): Ryan Simonetti, pro skateboarder and Kim Kardashian*, socialite, model and actress

Patient, Age	Hometown	Diagnosis	Initiation Treatment	Personal Procedure	Scores	Final Status
Chris Arnold, 19	N/A	Momma's Boy	Blood Letting	The Ol' Towel Whip	1:P / 2:P / 3:P	Cured
John Yaw, 22	N/A	Anger Management	The Black Eye Game	Unleash Anger	1:P / 2:P / 3:P	Cured
Dallan Loomis, 20	N/A	Weak	Dog Run	*Celebrity Bodyguard	1:P / 2:P / 3:F	Terminal

=== Episode 6 ===
- Aired: November 5, 2007
- Group Therapy: Push the "Skatemobile", designed by Dr. Steve-O and by Ryan Simonetti.
- Special Guest(s): Ryan Simonetti, pro skateboarder

Patient, Age	Hometown	Diagnosis	Initiation Treatment	Personal Procedure	Scores	Final Status
Maxwell Lewin, 19 (a.k.a. Max)	Somewhere in the Eastern U.S.	Un-Worldly	Exotic Dining	Acupuncture	1:P / 2:P / 3:P	Cured
Harold Hauck, 21	N/A	Trapped in Cyberspace	Hitchhike in Drag	Direct a Video	1:P / 2:P / 3:P	Cured
Michael Papero, 23	N/A	Acts like an Old Man	Dance Lessons	Party Limo	1:P / 2:P / 3:P	Cured

=== Episode 7 ===
- Aired: November 12, 2007
- Note: Originally the pilot episode.
- Group Therapy: None
- Special Guest(s): Brian*, bully

Patient, Age	Hometown	Diagnosis	Initiation Treatment	Personal Procedure	Scores	Final Status
Todd, 22	Riverside, California	Can't Make Decisions	Destroy Nerdy Possessions	Walk on Glass	1:P / 2:P	Cured
Kenny, 23	N/A	Hydrophobic	Bobbing for Guts	High Dive	1:P / 2:P	Cured
Jason	Ontario, California	Bully Target	Toughen Up Appearances	*Bully Nut Whack	1:P / 2:P	Cured
