= Manny Puig =

American wildlife entertainer (born 1954)

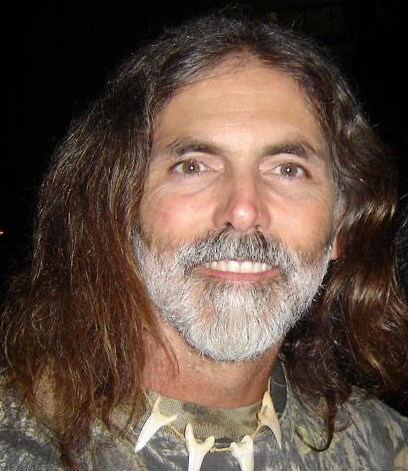
- Puig in 2005
- Born: 1954 or 1955 (age 71–72); Cuba
- Occupation: Wildlife entertainer
- Years active: 1999–present
- Website: mannypuig.com

Manny Puig (born 1954 or 1955) is an American wildlife entertainer who is known for his encounters with dangerous animals, such as sharks, black bears and American alligators. He has made frequent appearances on the television shows Jackass and Wildboyz, and also on the Animal Planet show Gator Boys. He is also known for hosting Outdoor Channel's "Savage Wild".

Puig has appeared in numerous documentaries as an animal expert. He has also appeared on Late Night with Conan O'Brien and on Shark Week.

== Early life ==
Puig was born in Cuba. At a young age, he and his mother immigrated to Florida, where he learned about wildlife, traveling through the Everglades, and hunting deer and catching small alligators.

== Career ==
In the late 1990s, Puig worked with Mehgan Heaney-Grier and Mark Rackley, both in training Grier as a free diver and in filming underwater encounters with animals such as alligators and sharks. Rackley worked as a spear fisherman and underwater videographer. Puig had experience as an animal handler on movie sets and learned how to ride and handle alligators in their environment. The trio formed a company called Extreme Encounters, and the footage they produced led to the Animal Planet series titled Extreme Contact.

Puig has appeared on the television program Jackass, in Jackass: The Movie, Jackass Number Two, Jackass 2.5, Jackass 3D, and Jackass 3.5. In these projects, he is credited as an expert on predatory animals. One of Puig's stunts is featured in the second film, where he dives with Steve-O around hammerhead and other sharks. Steve-O recalled the segment in his autobiography:

The following day, Chris Pontius and I were scheduled to swim with great hammerhead sharks, accompanied by Manny....with the butt piercing wound still fresh, swimming with sharks might not have been very smart, but Manny wasn't worried about it....In retrospect, the fact that Manny was the arbiter of what was safe and reasonable is hilarious. He hatched and okayed plenty of ideas that were clearly not okay. So you knew if he said no to something, that meant "FUCK NO!" As it happened, Manny had no problem sending us swimming with great hammerheads.

Puig is also featured on the MTV program Wildboyz, where he resumes the role of a predatory-animal expert. In one segment of Wildboyz, Puig allowed a snapping turtle to bite his hand.

After finishing the second Jackass movie and with the final season of Wildboyz having completed, Puig produced his own film entitled Ultimate Predator. The film shows him interacting with sharks and other animals. The film also features adventures with Johnny Knoxville, Steve-O, Chris Pontius, and Jeff Tremaine. Towards the end of filming, Puig left the set due to a confrontation with fellow wildlife expert David Weathers.

During Discovery Channel's Shark Week in 2003, Puig was profiled for an episode entitled "Diary of a Shark Man".

Puig's left middle finger was amputated after a rattlesnake bite.

== Filmography ==
=== Films ===
Year	Title	Role	Notes
2002	Jackass: The Movie	Himself	Guest appearances
2006	Ultimate Predator	Himself	Direct-to-video; Producer
2006	National Lampoon's TV: The Movie	Manny the Gator Guy	Direct-to-video
2006	Jackass Number Two	Himself	Guest appearances
2007	Jackass 2.5	Himself	Guest appearances
2009	Jackass: The Lost Tapes	Himself	Direct-to-video; Archive footage Guest appearances
2010	Jackass 3D	Himself	Guest appearances
2011	Jackass 3.5	Himself	Guest appearances
2026	Jackass: Best and Last	Himself	Archive footage

=== Television ===
Year	Title	Role	Notes
1999	The Unexplained	Himself	1 episode
1999	Run for Cover	Himself	TV special
2000-2001	Extreme Contact	Himself	20 episodes
2000–2001	Jackass	Himself	4 episodes Guest appearances
2001	Deep Diver	Himself	
2003–2006	Wildboyz	Himself	12 episodes Guest appearances
2003–2007	Shark Week	Himself	2 episodes
2003	MTV Video Music Awards Latinoamérica 2003	Himself	Presenter
2006	Late Night with Conan O'Brien	Himself	1 episode
2008	Jackassworld.com: 24 Hour Takeover	Himself	TV special Guest appearances
2009	Savage Wild	Himself	Host; Writer
2012	Gator Boys	Himself	1 episode
