= Cockeyed.com =

Website covering various subjects projects

- Website type: Various
- Available in: English
- Owner: Rob Cockerham
- Website: cockeyed.com
- Commercial: Yes
- Registration: No
- Launched: 1998; 28 years ago
- Current status: Active

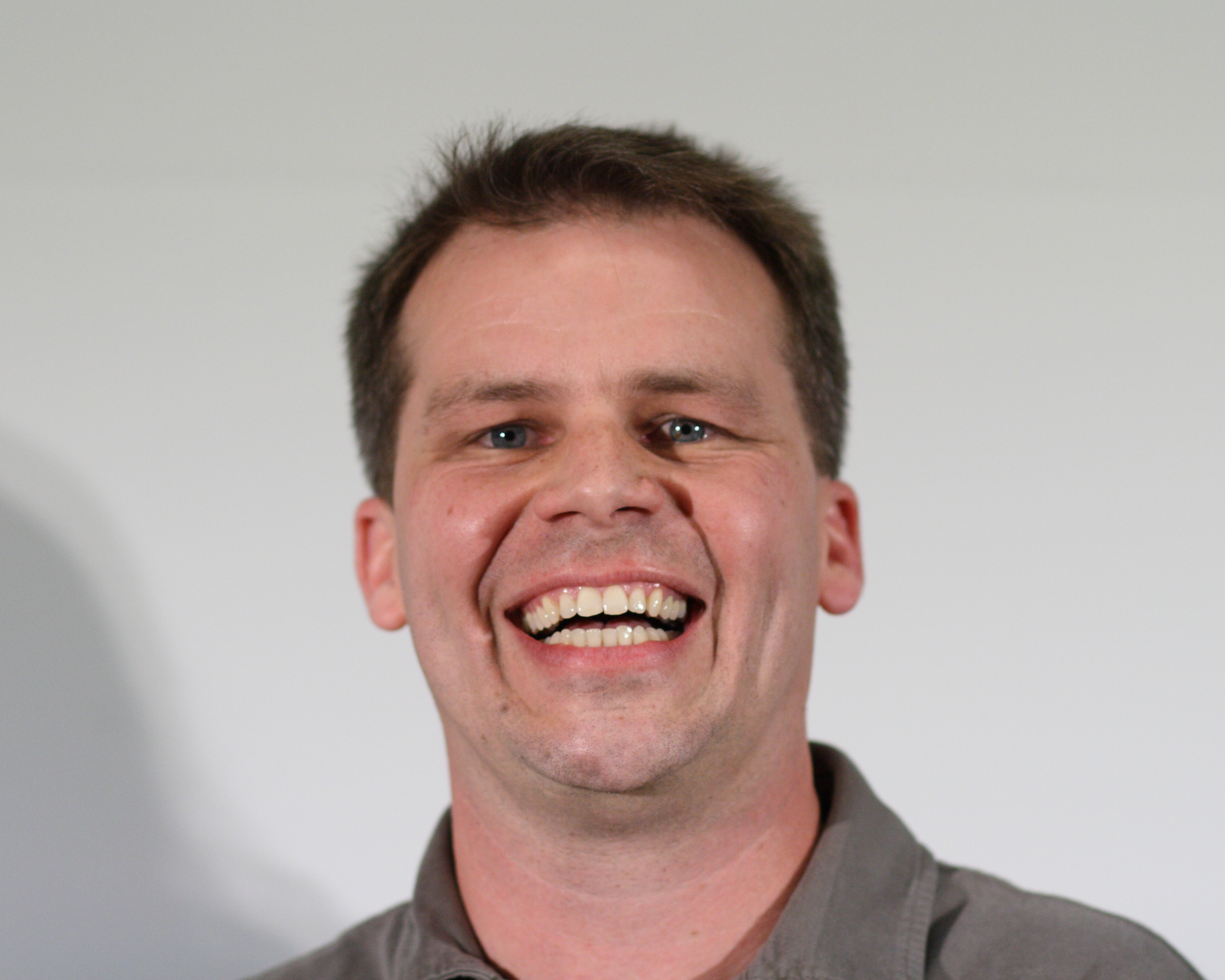
Cockeyed.com proprietor Rob Cockerham at ROFLCon II in 2010

Cockeyed.com is a website that covers a variety of subjects, most of which are projects undertaken by the site's creator, Rob Cockerham. Since the creator lives in Sacramento, California, many of his projects take place in notable Sacramento landmarks.

One of the most popular articles is called "How Much is Inside", which has been part of the website since its establishment in 1998. There are more than 40 episodes online.

Other sections are the Pranks, the educational Science Club and Cockerham's Incredible Creations, all of which are presented with pictures detailing the steps of the project.

Cockerham has also used the site as a platform to locate and harass people who engage in spamming.

A particular focus of the website is the multi-level marketing business opportunity from Herbalife. Rob has dedicated many pages to criticizing its independent distributors' use of signs in public spaces as well as the Herbalife business model.

The website has been featured on NPR, 20/20 and in a segment during the 24 Hours of Foo event on MTV2.

== How Much is Inside? Adventures ==
This largest section of Cockeyed.com contains documentation of projects in which Cockerham and his friends measure the usefulness of products, including:

- How much gold is inside Goldschläger?
- An estimate to the ratio of various nuts inside mixed nuts
- Measuring the average length of ramen noodles
- Counting the distribution of color and phrasing in a bag of conversation hearts
- Counting how many chips can be dipped in one can of salsa
- Other "How Much is Inside?" projects measure the utility of:
  Paper towels, Sharpie pens, a Christmas tree, bacon bits, Dial Complete soap, a Pumpkin, an acre, a keg of beer, spaghetti, popcorn bag, Vegemite spread, a Chevy Trailblazer, a million dollars, Dust-Off can, handrolling tobacco, Oreo cookies, a pound of ground coffee beans, Coca-Cola bottle, french fries, ketchup, print cartridge, chewing gum, 40-foot shipping container, Magic Shell, batteries, Doritos, Cheerios, newspaper, lipstick, Silly String, "blood", aluminum foil, expanding foam, whipped cream, EZ Cheese, toothpaste and one fake measurement of shaving cream.

Rather than using statistical methods to estimate the contents, the group favors measuring the amounts. For example, to figure out how much is inside of a keg, they (and an invited group of "fellow scientists") poured and consumed 141 individual cups of beer. Another way to determine the amount would have been to simply calculate the volume of the keg and divide by the volume of each cup.
