= Wildboyz =

American television series

- Title card from episode 3 of Season 1
- Genre: Reality; Comedy; Black comedy Toilet humor Cringe comedy Physical comedy Slapstick; Pranks
- Created by: Jeff Tremaine; Chris Pontius; Steve-O; Dimitry Elyashkevich; Sean Cliver
- Directed by: Jeff Tremaine
- Starring: Chris Pontius; Steve-O
- Narrated by: John Rhys-Davies; Manny Puig (warning only)
- Music by: Dave Roen
- Opening theme: "The Age of Pamparius" by Turbonegro
- Country of origin: United States
- Original language: English
- No. of seasons: 4
- No. of episodes: 32

Production
- Executive producers: Jeff Tremaine; Trip Taylor (seasons 1–2); Dimitry Elyashkevich; Sean Cliver; Derek Freda (season 4)
- Producers: Alex Dimitrijevic; Tabrez Noorani
- Production locations: South Africa; Alaska, U.S. Florida, U.S. Australia; New Zealand; Belize; India; Brazil; Kenya; Costa Rica; Rwanda; Indonesia; Louisiana, U.S. Gulf of Mexico; Deep South, U.S. Mexico; Argentina; Thailand; Russia; California, U.S.
- Cinematography: Dimitry Elyashkevich
- Editors: Scott Simmons; Seth Casriel; Kristine Young Gaffney
- Running time: 18–22 minutes
- Production company: Dickhouse Productions

Original release
- Network: MTV
- Release: October 26, 2003 – June 13, 2004
- Network: MTV2
- Release: March 11, 2005 – February 24, 2006

Related
- Jackass

Wildboyz is an American television series which debuted in 2003 on MTV and moved to MTV2 in its third season. It is a spin-off and follow-up to Jackass. The show stars Steve-O and Chris Pontius, who perform stunts and acts with animals, often putting themselves in situations for which they are not trained.

== Format ==
Wildboyz follows the antics of Chris Pontius and Steve-O as they travel around the globe. Over the course of 4 seasons, Pontius and Steve-O traveled to 19 different locations. At each location, the pair would interact with the wild and learn the culture of the natives. Some of their antics include dressing up and running with the animals they encounter, subjecting themselves to the defense mechanisms of the animals, and eating the food of the local people.

The dangerous nature of the stunts go beyond that of either Jackass or another similar spin-off, Viva La Bam. In the course of the show, Steve-O purposely subjected himself to the relatively mild sting of the emperor scorpion on more than one occasion, and Pontius was nearly attacked by a jaguar and was bitten by an American black bear. One of their most dangerous stunts showed the boys attracting a great white shark while disguised as seals, then jumping into the open water just 10 meters away. Another stunt included dangling meat attached to a hammock to attract lions. In yet another dangerous stunt, the pair dressed up as fake zebras to try to lure lions. The supposed sport of "hyena football" also made its debut, which in its earliest form was nothing more than a game of keep-away with a pack of spotted hyenas, using smoked ham as a ball. The "sport", according to its founders, "deserves Olympic status".

Some of the scenes were intentionally mislabeled for dramatization, as many of the animals used were from a company called Hollywood Animals.

Several members of the Jackass cast and crew contributed assistance to the show. The co-creator, director, and producer of Jackass, Jeff Tremaine, served as director and executive producer of Wildboyz. Cameramen Dimitry Elyashkevich and Rick Kosick, and photographer Sean Cliver also continued to work alongside Tremaine on Wildboyz. Manny Puig, a wild animal expert who appeared on Jackass several times, occasionally joined the Wildboyz on their adventures. Fellow Jackass cast members Johnny Knoxville, Wee Man and Loomis Fall also made guest appearances on the show throughout all four seasons.

=== End ===
The show ended in 2006, after four seasons. Steve-O later wrote in his memoir that "Wildboyz probably could've kept going after Season 4. It just didn't seem like there was a point. Over time, it had essentially evolved back into Jackass. During our final trip to Russia there were no stunts that wouldn't have fit in just as easily on Jackass. Johnny Knoxville came along on that trip too, which contributed even more to that vibe." Though no proper series finale was created, the concept of Wildboyz was somewhat revisited during Jackass Number Two (2006), which was filmed after Wildboyz had ended. Director Jeff Tremaine says, "We shot some of the most amazing stuff [for Wildboyz] we've ever made. And so one of the ideas with Number Two was to recreate some of the best things we ever shot for Wildboyz. Unfortunately, it didn't always work out."

- "The Fish Hook" sketch in Jackass Number Two featured Wildboyz stars Pontius, Steve-O and frequent collaborator Manny Puig, fishing for sharks in the Gulf of Mexico. The sketch involved Pontius fishing with Steve-O as his bait, and in order to attach himself to Pontius' fishing line, Steve-O put a fish hook through his cheek. The sketch ended after Steve-O kicked a mako shark in the head. During the commentary for Jackass Number Two, cameraman Dimitry Elyashkevich jokingly called the sketch "Wildboyz: The Movie!".
- The "How to Milk a Horse" sketch was in fact originally filmed for Wildboyz, according to Tremaine in the director's commentary for the DVD release, but due to its explicit content (Steve-O, Pontius, and Knoxville obtained a sperm sample from a studded horse, which Pontius proceeded to drink), Tremaine said that it would never have aired on MTV, and was shown in Jackass Number Two instead
- The "Prostate Exam" sketch was also originally filmed for Wildboyz, where Knoxville gets a prostate exam in Saint Petersburg, Russia. It was shown in Jackass 2.5 (2007).
- Also in Jackass 2.5, the Wildboyz, along with Dave England, returned to India to once again film with the Aghori tribe. This did not go as planned and Tremaine called it the "ultimate failed bit". After that, he said they would not film any more Wildboyz stuff for Jackass.

A bit called "The Donkey Ride" was filmed for Jackass 3D (2010), where Knoxville and Steve-O got in a donkey costume together, with Knoxville in front, and Steve-O in the back, in an attempt to get humped by a donkey. It did not work out and can be seen in the deleted scenes of Jackass 3.5 (2011). This was already successfully done and shown in an episode of Wildboyz, but with an elk instead of a donkey.

A bit similar to the "Sarcophilus Satanicus" bit from Wildboyz was shown in Jackass Forever (2022), where Wee Man is tied to the ground, and Pontius and Steve-O put pieces of meat Wee Man. A vulture is then released, and eats the meat off of Wee Man, while Pontius and Steve-O are worshiping the vulture.

== Cast and crew ==
=== Starring ===
- Chris Pontius
- Steve-O

=== Recurring ===
- Manny Puig
- David Weathers

=== Guest stars ===
- Johnny Knoxville
- Wee Man
- Loomis Fall
- Roger Alan Wade
- Mat Hoffman
- Tony Hawk
- Bob Burnquist
- Ryan Simonetti
- David Hasselhoff
- Method Man
- Juvenile
- Three 6 Mafia
- John Seasock

== Episodes ==
Season	Episodes	Originally released	
Season	Episodes	First released	Last released
1	8	October 26, 2003	December 14, 2003
2	8	April 25, 2004	June 13, 2004
3	8	March 11, 2005	April 29, 2005
4	8	January 6, 2006	February 24, 2006

=== Season 1 (2003) ===
No. overall	No. in season	Title	Original release date
1	1	"South Africa"	October 26, 2003
2	2	"Alaska"	November 2, 2003
3	3	"Florida"	November 9, 2003
4	4	"Australia"	November 16, 2003
5	5	"South Africa 2"	November 23, 2003
6	6	"Alaska 2"	November 30, 2003
7	7	"New Zealand"	December 7, 2003
8	8	"Belize"	December 14, 2003

=== Season 2 (2004) ===
No. overall	No. in season	Title	Original release date
9	1	"India"	April 25, 2004
10	2	"Brazil"	May 2, 2004
11	3	"Kenya"	May 9, 2004
12	4	"Costa Rica"	May 16, 2004
13	5	"Australia 2"	May 23, 2004
14	6	"Florida 2"	May 30, 2004
15	7	"East Africa"	June 6, 2004
16	8	"Indonesia"	June 13, 2004

=== Season 3 (2005) ===
No. overall	No. in season	Title	Original release date
17	1	"Louisiana"	March 11, 2005
18	2	"India 2"	March 18, 2005
19	3	"Indonesia 2"	March 25, 2005
20	4	"Brazil 2"	April 1, 2005
21	5	"Kenya 2"	April 8, 2005
22	6	"India 3"	April 15, 2005
23	7	"The Deep South"	April 22, 2005
24	8	"Mexico"	April 29, 2005

=== Season 4 (2006) ===
No. overall	No. in season	Title	Original release date
25	1	"Argentina"	January 6, 2006
26	2	"Thailand"	January 13, 2006
27	3	"Russia"	January 27, 2006
28	4	"California"	February 3, 2006
29	5	"Mexico 2"	February 3, 2006
30	6	"Argentina 2"	February 10, 2006
31	7	"Thailand 2"	February 17, 2006
32	8	"Russia 2"	February 24, 2006

== Special ==
Title	Original release date
"Wildboyz: Over & Out"	2006
The cast reflect on their wildest experiences when filming the show.

== Home media ==
=== Season releases ===
DVD name	Ep #	Release date	Additional information
The Complete First Season	8	October 26, 2004	Commentary by Chris Pontius, Steve-O and creators Jeff Tremaine and Dimitry Elyashkevich, Deleted scenes, "Making of Wildboyz" featurette, a "bite list", a "Wildboyz encyclopedia", Music videos, Bios, Interviews, Photo gallery.
The Complete 2nd Season - Uncensored	8	April 26, 2005	Commentary featuring Steve-O, Chris Pontius, Johnny Knoxville, Wee-Man and co-creators Dimitry Elyashkevich and Jeff Tremaine, Never-before-seen bonus segments, Outtakes, Bloopers, Behind-the-scenes featurette: "Wildboyz Unclothed", "Bite list", Photo gallery, Wildboyz encyclopedia & trivia game, Easter Eggs.
Complete Seasons 3 & 4 - Unrated	16	September 12, 2006	Commentary featuring Johnny Knoxville, Chris Pontius, Steve-O, Wee-Man, and More!, Outtakes, Unaired Segments, Top 10 Wildboyz Moments, Wildboyz featurette "Over & Out", Photo Gallery.

All 4 seasons became available for streaming on Paramount+ on June 1, 2022.
