= Artsplosure =

Arts and cultural event production studio in Raleigh, North Carolina, U.S.

Coordinates: 35.7775°N 78.6358°W

Artsplosure is a nonprofit arts & cultural event production studio based in Raleigh, North Carolina. Artsplosure's mission is to "give all people in the Raleigh community meaningful opportunities to experience the arts and enhance their cultural perspective". Artsplosure hosts Artsplosure - The Raleigh Arts Festival held each May in downtown Raleigh as well as WRAL First Night Raleigh, held annually on New Year's Eve in downtown Raleigh. Artsplosure is funded in part by the city of Raleigh based on the recommendations of the Raleigh Arts Commission and is supported by the North Carolina Arts Council, a division of the Department of Natural and Cultural Resources.

Moore Square Historic District, Raleigh, NC during the Artsplosure

== About the Artsplosure - The Raleigh Arts Festival ==
The two-day event is held annually on the third weekend in May and includes over 170 visual artists showing and selling their work on the Fayetteville Street in downtown Raleigh, North Carolina. Artsplosure also features live music performances on the main stage local artists. The event is free to the public.

== History ==
Artsplosure was conceived in 1978 by subcommittees of the newly formed City of Raleigh Arts Commission who were planning a citywide arts festival. The following year, Artsplosure was incorporated to produce high quality and accessible arts festivals and to identify, nurture, and showcase artists seeking to reach wider audiences.

The first city-wide multi-disciplinary arts festival took place in April 1980 in conjunction with the American Institute of Architects conference.
