= Apple Chill =

Festival in North Carolina, United States

Apple Chill is a festival in North Carolina. The event takes place in late April. Food vendors, crafters, and a kids zone attract more than 30,000 people to the host city. The festival began in 1972 in Chapel Hill, where the name is a spoonerism. It ran for over 30 years until 2006 when shootings forced the town to formally disband it, then later began hosting the event again a couple years later. The nickname "After Chill" was used to describe the drinking and cruising that continued late into the night after the festival was over.

From 2007 until 2010 the festival was held at the Roxboro Motorsports Dragway in Roxboro. From 2011 to 2014 the festival was held at the Fayetteville Motor Sports Park in Fayetteville, North Carolina. In 2015, the Apple Chill was held at Roxboro Motorsports, and in 2016 it was held at Fayetteville Motor Sports Park. Normally the event is held on the first Sunday in May. The 2016 event took place on Sunday, May 8, after being rescheduled due to the anticipation of rain on May 1. The most recent Apple Chill festival was held in June 2023.

== Media and influence ==
Radio stations such as KISS FM often begin advertising this festival in late November. However, in November 2020, the event had to be canceled due to the COVID breakout.

== Attractions ==
Drag racing and painted motorcycles are carried out during this Apple Chill. There are also pop culture stars that attend and sing their hits. A lot of people usually make it for those.
