= Transformus =

Regional Burning Man art festival in West Virginia, USA

- Locations: Stokes County, North Carolina, United States
- Inaugurated: July 30-August 1, 2004
- Most recent: July 18–22, 2024
- Participants: 1,950 (2019 ticket sales)
- Website: www.transformus.com

Transformus is a regional Burning Man art festival in Stokes County, North Carolina, held on the third weekend of July and previously hosted on Marvin's Mountaintop in Masontown, West Virginia. The community forms a temporary city called Mysteria during the third weekend in July which includes art installations, neighborhoods, lively nightlife and camps which offer services to the community. Since 2006 Transformus has distributed over $207,747 in art grants to the community. It remains one of the most art-centric Burner events in the U.S. Transformus celebrates Burning Man's 10 principles of radical inclusion, radical gifting, radical decommodification, radical self-reliance, radical self-expression, communal effort, civic responsibility, leaving no trace, participation and immediacy. Transformus also focuses on consent as its 11th principle.

== History ==
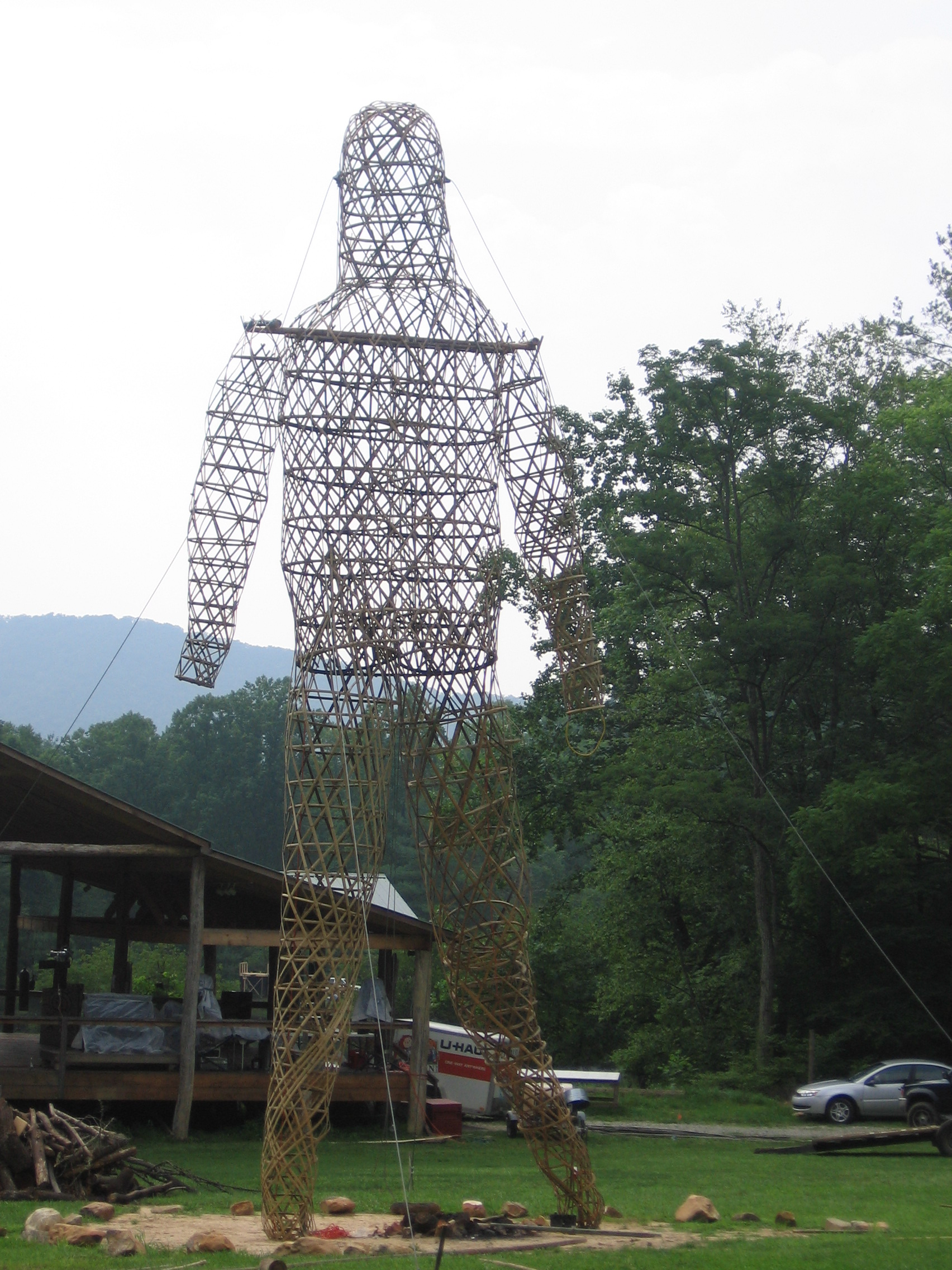
The Bamboozler on the day before the burn - photo by FeyDreva

The first Transformus was held in 2004. The event remains 100% community driven to this day. Begun with no firm infrastructure, it quickly became apparent that a leadership group was necessary to give direction and protection to the event. Founded by seven individuals (Debra, Wordplay, Chw, Rhythm, Uncle Jonah, Diesel and Theory), Transformus now has an LLC board of directors, event planning committee and team leads – all volunteers – who collaboratively drive the event through minimal policy and responsible safety teams. The event has grown quickly: in 2004 350 tickets were purchased and participants came from 10 U.S. states. In 2012, 2,059 tickets were purchased and participants came from over 33 U.S. states and several foreign countries.

== Event ==
Transformus was previously held in one of the only Temperate Rainforests in North America. Large amounts of rainfall are common, and on more than one occasion have made ignition of the effigy slow and difficult. Attendees were not allowed to take their vehicle to their campsite, and instead are expected to unload their gear and either haul it by foot to their campsite, or wait for a volunteer to help them haul their gear on a golf-cart.

Transformus is built around two central events: an effigy burn on Saturday night and a temple/art burn on Sunday night. These "burns" mean various things to various people and remain completely undefined by leadership. All are invited to personalize the temple before it is burned. Each structure is designed and built by volunteer teams. Artistic expression is a very important part of Transformus and many participants create interactive art installations specifically for the event. The LLC seeds this artistic expression through the fair distribution of Creativity Grants with over $207,747 distributed to the community since 2006. Grants are not allocated by the leadership but by the community through an open jury of volunteers. To avoid nepotism, members of the LLC are not eligible for art funding. Together, attendees of Transformus build a temporary city called Mysteria and then remove every trace before the event ends.

== Theme Camps ==
Apart from the participant themself, the most common social unit in Mysteria is called a theme camp. These theme camps frequently offer services to the community such as food, drink, music, interactive art, and other novel or surprising experiences.

Popular past theme camps include:

- Gypsy Bar
- Camp SCIENCE!
- Bacon Camp
- Camp Chocolypse Now!
- The Pallet Bar
- The Intergalactic House of Pancakes (IHoP)
- The Dirty Southern Burners,
- Cape Sphere
- Litt Valhalla
- Garden of Hedons
- The Philosopherz Stone
- Radical Faeries
- The Visible Trash Society
- The Philadelphia Experiment (PEX),
- Baron Samedi's VIP Lounge and Ball Pit
- Willy Wonka's
- Big Puffy Yellow,
- Camp Crayola
- Kasa de la Kozee
- Temple of Boom
- Dogs on Papasans
- Elders Camp
- Green Man Camp
- Local Fauna
- Flag Camp
- Pretty Titty Bang Bang
- Queer Ass Folk
- Bubble Camp
- Party Liberation Front (PLF)
- Camp Contact.
- Mustacheville
- The Fire Triangle
- Arcana
- Percussion Junction
- D.A.M.M. Camp
- You Are Beautiful

== Ethics ==
Several themes and/or ethics are encouraged during the event, based on the ten principles of Burning Man. These include:

- Leave No Trace (or LNT) - everyone is expected to be responsible for any matter that they bring to the event. There are no public trash cans.
- Gift Economy - no sale or barter is allowed at the event. Participants are asked to bring what they can and gift as they are able.
- Radical Inclusion - everyone is welcome to be a part of the event.
- Radical Self-Reliance - do what needs to be done and do not be a burden to others. Ensure that you bring enough to sustain yourself throughout the event.
- Radical Self-Expression - be yourself, however you wish. Allow others to do the same.
- Communal Effort - work together to make the best possible.
- Civic Responsibility - every citizen bears a responsibility to contribute to the community as a whole.
- Participation - no one attending is an observer; no spectators.
- Immediacy - participants are to become part of the event and explore their inner selves in relation to the event and surroundings
- Decommodification - rejection of corporate advertising, branding and sales of any kind.

== Transformus' status as an Official Burning Man Regional Event ==
Transformus was founded in 2004 as an art, music and spiritually-focused counterculture festival, independent from Burning Man. In 2005, prior to the second event, Transformus became The Southeast Regional Burn, an official Burning Man regional. In June 2008, Burning Man's regional committee revoked Transformus' status as an official Burning Man event. In a letter to the Transformus community, Burning Man cited lack of civic responsibility and transparency as the reasons. In 2009 Transformus was invited by Burning Man to reapply for official event status but initially chose to remain independent. In early 2010, Transformus was reinstated as an official Burning Man regional event and is a sanctioned regional burn regularly participating in the global Burning Man community.
