= National Lampoon's TV: The Movie =

- Official DVD cover
- Directed by: Sam Maccarone
- Written by: Amir Cyrius Ahanchian; Sam Maccarone; Preston Lacy; Steve-O
- Produced by: Adam Vetri; Preston Lacy
- Starring: Steve-O; Preston Lacy; Jason "Wee Man" Acuña; Chris Pontius; Tony Cox; Jason Mewes
- Cinematography: Edward A. Gutentag
- Edited by: Jon Greenhalgh; Charles Kaplan; Sam Maccarone; J.R. Morrison
- Music by: Tim Montijo
- Production company: National Lampoon Productions
- Distributed by: Mojoflo Productions
- Release dates: September 8, 2006 (Los Angeles); February 6, 2007 (DVD release)
- Running time: 86 minutes
- Country: United States
- Language: English

National Lampoon's TV: The Movie is a 2006 American parody film that features several cast members from the Jackass franchise, including Steve-O, Preston Lacy, Jason "Wee Man" Acuña and Chris Pontius. The film is a channel-surfing adventure through television programs and commercials. It features parodies of many television shows, such as Fear Factor, Cops, MTV Cribs, The Six Million Dollar Man and Miami Vice. A series of over fifty sketches makes up the movie: cartoons, reality shows, fake movie trailers, fake TV show trailers, and computer animation.

== Cast ==
- Steve-O as Himself / Satan / Stingray / Steve-O Doll
- Preston Lacy as Big Fat Party Guy / XXXL / Before / Michael Moore / Preston Lacy Doll / Ogre / Mrs. Smith
- Jason "Wee Man" Acuña as My Little Buddy / Wee-Man Doll / Cricket / Mobutu
- Chris Pontius as Jesus
- Ehren McGhehey as Jimmy Gonzalas
- Manny Puig as Manny, The Gator Guy
- Clifton Collins Jr. as Tijuana Cop #1 / Minion / Miranda
- Jacob Vargas as Tijuana Cop #2 / Announcer / Charlotte
- Dian Bachar as Gregg / Luigi / Cathy Ave / Joshua Benson / Other Fly / Stranger
- Lee Majors as Dr. Lakin / Announcer / Lieutenant / Six Million Year-Old Man / Cowboy
- Sam Maccarone as Chad / Kid / Dick Weston Fernandez / Jeffry Sutton / Dealer / T-Rex
- Jason Mewes as Carrie
- Judd Nelson as Fear Factor Host / Judd
- Danny Trejo as "Crow"
- Dimitry Elyashkevich as "Ace" Glover / Jackoff Smirnoff
- Tony Cox as Stubbs
- J.J. Darshaw as Gringo
- Ahmet Zappa as Army Host
- Pete Yorn as Bobby Peacock
- Ryan Simonetti as Himself
- Dave Buckner as Himself
- Elisa Donovan as Suzy Gottlieb
- Ian Somerhalder as Guy
- Eugenio Derbez as Derbez / Eugenio

== Production ==
The film stars Lee Majors, Jason Mewes, Sam Maccarone, Steve-O, Chris Pontius, Preston Lacy, Judd Nelson, Jason Acuña, Dian Bachar and Jacob Vargas. It was written by Sam Maccarone, Preston Lacy and Cyrus Ahanchian. The film was shot in 35mm, HD and miniDV.

The MTV Cribs parody with Steve-O and director Sam Maccarone was shot at 5am by Maccarone, with just the two of them and no crew.

Writer Amir Cyrus Ahanchian sued the film's producers in Ahanchian v. Xenon Pictures, Inc. for copyright infringement.

== Reception ==
National Lampoon's TV: The Movie received overwhelmingly negative reviews.
