= 24 Hours of Love =

24 Hours of Love is a special programming stunt that aired live on MTV2 starting on September 21, 2002. The official premise of the show was that rock star Courtney Love would do a live broadcast for 24 hours in a row, and that she would be in full control of the programming on MTV2 for those hours.

== Background ==
By 2002, longtime viewers of MTV2 were complaining that the channel was no longer airing obscure and lost music videos as it had done when it was still M2, the name given to the channel from 1996 to 1999. Instead, they noticed the channel began airing videos that had current pop success or were well-known retro videos from the 1980s and 1990s.

Around this time, MTV2 had a number of hour-long specials, in which celebrity guests were interviewed by a VJ and were able to pick what was described as their favorite videos. However, many of the videos chosen were all in that month's current video rotation, leading some viewers to suspect that the guests were only given a short list of videos they could choose from as opposed to any video in MTV's library.

The 24 Hours of Love special added to the suspicion among these viewers. This time, it was promoted that a celebrity was to be given full control of the channel for a 24-hour period to air anything she wanted. However, in reality, Love would discover it was difficult to air music videos that were not already in rotation on MTV2. In addition, the show was broadcast live, and Love was an over-the-top personality who was unafraid to speak her mind and complain about the actions of the channel.

== Promotion ==
In the days leading up to the event, MTV2 insisted that Love would have full programming control. The official Viacom press release to the Associated Press read as follows:

NEW YORK (AP) -- You've really gotta love Courtney Love if you tune into MTV2 this weekend. For 24 straight hours, the rock diva will be in control of the music network. She'll play the videos she likes, invite her friends over for an on-camera jab fest and do whatever else she pleases, the network said Monday.

"MTV2 has always been home to a variety of artists," said David Cohn, MTV2 general manager. "So much so, we wanted to let them move in, and we are thrilled to give Courtney the first set of keys."

This is the first time the network has relinquished control to an artist for a day, representatives said. Love won't even need to stay awake the entire 24 hours; an MTV spokesman says when she sleeps, the network will probably show snippets of her dozing. The former lead singer of Hole will take over the MTV studios in Times Square for "24 Hours of Love" at 8 p.m. (EDT) Saturday.

During the week before the broadcast, Love heavily promoted the show. While appearing on the Howard Stern radio show, she stated that she would be airing any video she wanted and that she was interested in videos by female rock artists. In an interview for USA Today, she claimed that she would also be airing the movies Performance and Times Square, and she had also mentioned bringing in clips from other movies.

== Event ==
On Saturday, September 21, 2002, at 8 p.m. ET, 24 Hours of Love went on the air live with Courtney Love and a friend named Ursula. At this time, Love again explained that she would have full control of the programming. However, the movies and movie clips were no longer mentioned. An unconfirmed account claims that Love was not told until immediately before the broadcast that MTV2 did not have the rights to air those movies. Additionally, the film Performance had an X rating, which meant since MTV2 had low power television broadcast affiliates, it would have been unable to air that film without risking punishment with the FCC, and the condemnation of the network's advertisers.

Between the guests during the whole 24 hours, there were Albert Hammond, Jr. and Fabrizio Moretti from The Strokes, Ryan Adams and Eve, besides phone conversations with artists like Cameron Crowe and Michael Stipe.

=== Problems with airing videos ===
As the evening progressed, viewers at home saw Love introduce videos that faded out after a few seconds, replaced by regular rotation videos. While very few of the women rocker videos she said would dominate the show actually aired, U2's "Electrical Storm" aired twice in a two-hour period. At the time, "Electrical Storm" was in heavy rotation on the channel.

About two hours into the broadcast, Love took a live phone call from friend and musician Moby, who informed her that the videos she was introducing were either not airing or were being cut off after a few seconds. Annoyed, Love demanded they re-air the videos that were cut off.

Less than an hour later, Love began apologizing, claiming that she was told MTV did not have most of the videos she wanted to air, and that it had just been explained to her that the record labels had erased those videos, not realizing they would have any value years later. However, around that time, sister channel VH1 Classic regularly aired some of the videos that Love said MTV2 no longer had in their possession. Sometimes when Love introduced a video, the wrong version would air, and Love herself would cut it off and again apologize to the viewers.

A third of the way through the broadcast, Love was irritated that very few of the videos she had asked for were available, and she began screaming that she wanted to see a video by the group Heart. After MTV2 told her hours earlier that they did not have any Heart videos, suddenly a 1980s Heart video was found and aired. From that moment forward, videos that Love wanted to see finally started airing, such as Traci Lords' "Fallen Angel".

=== Apathy rules the airwaves ===
By dawn on Sunday, September 22, 2002, Love was apparently too fatigued to check to see that the videos she chose were airing. After Love introduced a Samantha Fox video and it aired for a few seconds, Love interrupted it to apologize for airing it, and subsequently asked MTV2 to air something else instead. Some viewers who taped the show claimed that Love interrupting the video was not live at all, but actually taped hours earlier, and was a clip of her interrupting a different video.

From that point forward, only videos in MTV2's current rotation aired. Early Sunday morning, Love had to take a nap. Instead of continuing to air the special live as promised, MTV2 re-aired an MTV Unplugged episode with Nirvana, followed by edited highlights from moments earlier in the broadcast, mixed with current rotation videos that were edited into the show. By the afternoon, Love was awake again, but was in no mood to continue the special. She spent the last few hours nearly in tears on the couch. She was nearly unable to interview scheduled guests and no longer challenged what videos aired.

== See also ==
- 24 Hours of Foo
