= 24 Hours of Foo =

US television program

24 Hours of Foo is a live special on MTV2 hosted by the rock band Foo Fighters, which aired on June 11 and 12, 2005. It was very similar in concept to 24 Hours of Love, a live special hosted by Courtney Love that the channel tried to air in 2002.

== About the broadcast ==
Beginning at noon ET on Saturday, June 11, 2005, the Foo Fighters' Dave Grohl, Chris Shiflett, Nate Mendel, and Taylor Hawkins took over the MTV2 airwaves for an entire day to host a selection of music videos and live events.

The original press release from MTV Networks stated, "Together, the band will not only host MTV2, but also program and direct the channel in any way that they please with special guests, live performances, and a roster of activities that only the Foo Fighters could dream up." The release went on to claim, "Whether it is an impromptu wedding, a celebrity ping pong tournament, or simply following the guys as they venture into Times Square, MTV2 cameras will capture every moment live." IGN Music reported Dave Grohl as saying, "24 hours of Foo? Live on MTV2? It's gonna be awesome. The Foo is expecting you!"

=== Live performances ===
The highlight of the broadcast was a one-hour, full-band live performance from the Foo Fighters, which took place at midnight. Earlier that evening, the Foo Fighters played a 30-minute acoustic Unplugged performance. A live episode of Headbangers Ball was also part of the broadcast that night, hosted by Dave Grohl as he interviewed special guests SuicideGirls.

=== Special guests and events ===
The 24-hour live broadcast also included other special events, including a drum circle in Times Square (which also featured Stewart Copeland), science experiments with Cockeyed.com's Rob Cockerham, an on-air wedding, a trivia game featuring comedian David Cross, and other appearances from MTV personalities and friends, including MTV News reporter Gideon Yago, comedian and actress Janeane Garofalo, Saturday Night Live's Amy Poehler and Fred Armisen, and comedian Robert Smigel as Triumph the Insult Comic Dog.

MTV2 VJ Jim Shearer was master of ceremonies for the event, launching the broadcast and staying with the Foo Fighters throughout all 24 hours until the end of the show. While some viewers noted that there was not a wide selection of music played during the broadcast, others believed that 24 Hours of Foo demonstrated MTV2 could still put together and air an unusually spectacular live special. Since 24 Hours of Foo, there were no other large-scale live broadcasts on MTV2 until 2007 when Human Giant 24 Aired on MTV2.

== See also ==
- 24 Hours of Love
