= Sam Macaroni =

American actor (1975–2025)

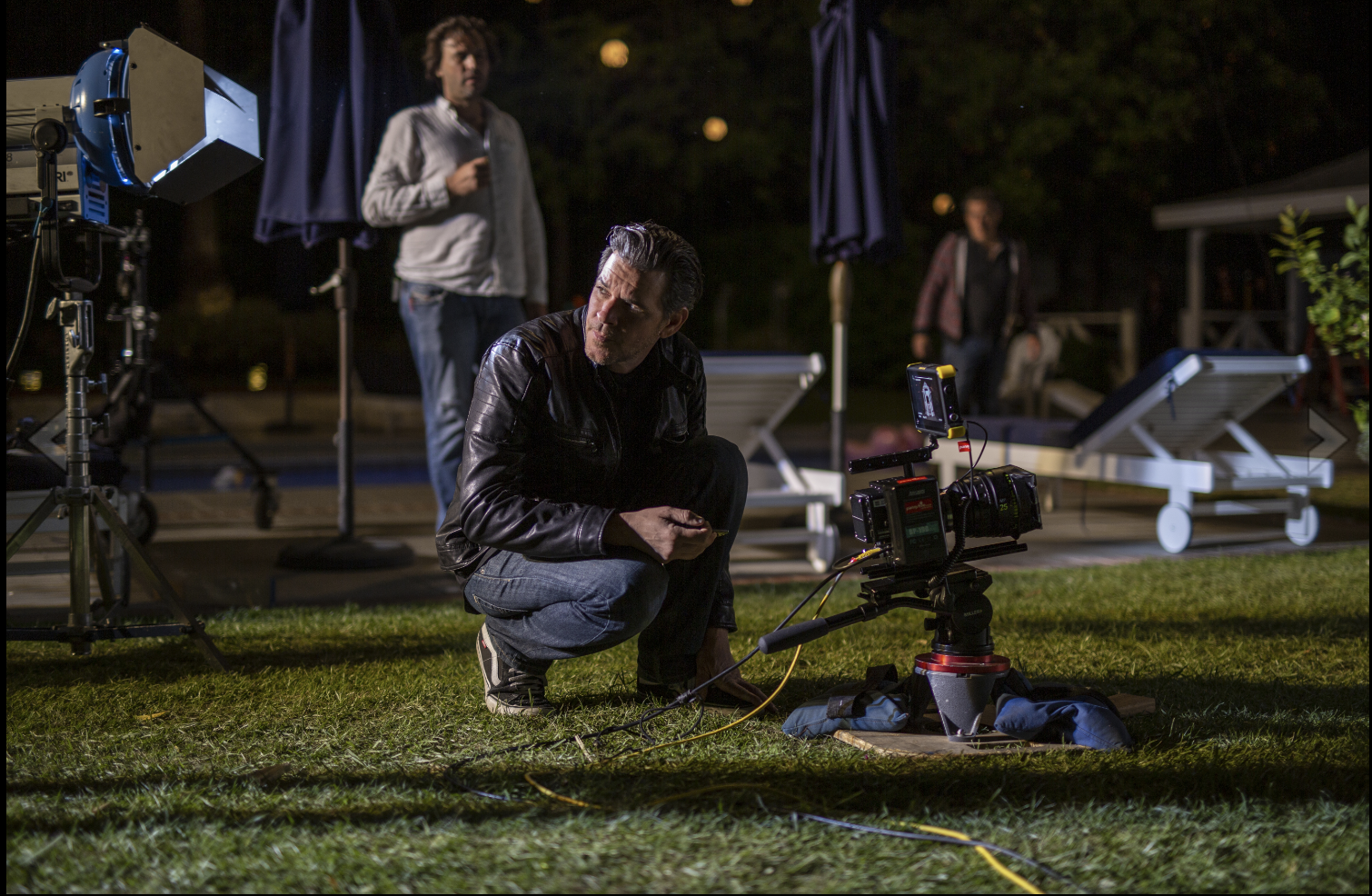
- Born: March 14, 1975; San Jose, California, U.S.
- Died: March 13, 2025 (aged 49)
- Education: Stella Adler Studio of Acting
- Occupations: Actor; Film director; Writer
- Notable work: Blackout (2022), Guest House (2020)

Samuel Maccarone (March 14, 1975 – March 13, 2025), better known as Sam Macaroni, was an American actor, film director and writer who wrote, directed and stars in National Lampoon's TV: The Movie. In the film, he plays Jeffrey Sutton, Dick Weston Fernandez and Chad (in You're in the Army Now).

== Background ==
Samuel Maccarone was born in San Jose, California on March 14, 1975. He grew up in Yosemite Valley, California. Macaroni began his filming career at the age of eleven when he earned his first video camera doing odd jobs. He attended Mariposa County High School class of 1993. During that time he made a film series called Hobi Chow that was very popular with his classmates. He went on to study at the Stella Adler Studio of Acting in Los Angeles.

Macaroni lived in Hollywood, Los Angeles from 1994, and had no children. He died from a brain aneurysm on March 13, 2025, one day before his 50th birthday.

== Career ==
=== Acting ===
He starred in ThinkFilm's Gangsta Rap: The Glockumentary along with Clifton Powell and rapper Too Short.

He played Billy in Les Claypool's directorial debut Electric Apricot: Quest for Festeroo.

In 2007, he was a guest on The Howard Stern Show.

In 2009, he starred in a Starbucks Via national television commercial as Roger the airline pilot.

On November 17, 2009, he appeared in an episode of The Forgotten on ABC.

=== Writing and directing ===
Macaroni was a writer for the 2006 Billboard Music Awards as well as a music video director for MCA/Universal Records. At age 24, Macaroni sold a show to MTV called "Disco Masters" which starred Sam as a disco dancing, beer drinking superhero.

Macaroni directed the music video for "Puppet Breakup" by Your Favorite Martian in September of 2011 featuring Lonnie Moore, Sylvain Bitton, Geisha House and pornstar Amia Miley.

Macaroni wrote and directed Guest House in 2020, and directed Blackout in 2022.
