= MTV2 =

American pay television channel

- Type: Sequel channel Music channel (formerly); Entertainment
- Country: United States
- Broadcast area: United States

Programming
- Languages: English; Spanish (via SAP audio track)
- Picture format: 1080i HDTV (downscaled to letterboxed 480i for the SDTV feed)

Ownership
- Owner: Skydance Global Cable Media (Skydance)
- Parent: MTV Entertainment Group
- Sister channels: list of assets owned by Skydance

History
- Launched: August 1, 1996; 30 years ago
- Replaced: The Box (1985–2001)
- Former names: M2 (1996–1999)

Links
- Website: mtv.com/mtv2

Availability

Streaming media
- Affiliated Streaming Service: Paramount+
- Service(s): DirecTV Stream, FuboTV, Hulu + Live TV, Philo, Sling TV, YouTube TV

MTV2 (formerly M2) is an American pay television channel owned by the Skydance Global Cable Media a division of Skydance, through STV's MTV Entertainment Group subdivision.

The channel launched initially as an all-music video service, once the original MTV had started to shift its programming. As with its parent network, MTV2's focus on music programming would gradually be downplayed during the 2000s. By 2011, MTV2 would primarily target young adult men with original and acquired lifestyle and reality programming, reruns of male-targeting shows from MTV, acquired sitcoms and movies, and a daily block of hip hop and rock genre videos in the early mornings.

Due to Viacom's 2017 restructuring plan, MTV2's original programs were eventually moved over to the flagship MTV network, while the former network would drop its music video blocks in November of that year.

As of November 2023, MTV2 is available to approximately 50 million pay television households in the United States-down from its 2013 peak of 82 million households.

In recent years, MTV2 has lost carriage with the growth of streaming alternatives including its parent company's Paramount+, and has generally been depreciated by Skydance in current retransmission consent negotiations with cable and streaming providers.

== History ==
=== 1996–1999: Early history as M2 ===
MTV2 began broadcasting as simply M2 on August 1, 1996 – MTV's 15th anniversary – with Beck's "Where It's At" being the first video to air. A near "flip side" of MTV, the original format focused mostly on music and aimed at a slightly older audience (23-year-olds than MTV's 21-year-olds), especially people who do not watch a lot of MTV.

In its first few years on the air, M2 was restricted to satellite television plus the few, small markets where digital cable was then available, limiting its audience reach to around 12 million homes by 2000. M2 also broadcast live over the internet during its early years, which meant it was similarly ahead of its time in a period when few people had broadband internet connections.

M2's early years was known for its playful or ironic programming decisions that underscored the channel's free-wheeling, subversive attitude; on January 1, 1999, M2 played the music video "1999" by Prince for 24 hours straight. M2 quickly gained favor with music insiders, and as its popularity and reputation grew within the music industry, it became common for musicians and record labels to request that their new videos premiere exclusively on M2 rather than MTV. Record companies often asked to have new artists appear on the channel in taped segments with the VJs. The Spice Girls made their first U.S. television appearance on M2, as did their video for "Wannabe". At the time of their appearance on M2, the girl group was a huge success in the United Kingdom, but they were relatively unknown to U.S. audiences.

Starting on January 1, 2000, in honor of the millennium, MTV2 attempted to play every music video in the MTV library in alphabetical order. While a majority of videos were played, many were skipped over. The special ended in mid-April 2000.

=== 1999–2005: Relaunch as MTV2 ===
MTV2's logo used from 1997 to 1999.

Due in part to the unexpectedly slow roll-out of the fledgling channel, MTV Networks decided to rebrand M2 in the first quarter of 1999, changing the name to MTV2. The name was previously used for VH1 as a working title when the channel was first announced back in 1984, before landing the name Video Hits One. In 1997, MTV's owner Viacom had bought out the rival music channel The Box. Starting on January 1, 2001, all households that had received The Box began to receive MTV2 in its place, putting the channel into millions of additional households. MTV2 also began adding television commercials to its broadcasts; beforehand, subscription providers interrupted MTV2's feed to insert their own ads.

A new show hosted by Jancee Dunn called MTV2 Request aired every weekday between 11 a.m. and 12 p.m. and again between 11 p.m. and midnight. All of the videos played on MTV2 Request were selected by online viewer requests. Another new show called Control Freak began in 2001, airing weekdays from 8 to 9 p.m. It used real-time viewer voting to select the next video to be played on the channel (out of three choices), while the current video was playing. The majority of the daytime schedule still featured a mix of rap, rock, and pop genre videos. By 2003, the network had 50 million subscribers in the United States.

During the Memorial Day weekend of 2002, MTV2 played a special called Increase The Beat. DJ Paul Oakenfold hosted the special and played videos from such artists as Fatboy Slim, Beastie Boys, and Jay-Z. The videos were arranged in order from slowest to fastest, based on the number of beats per minute of the song.

In 2003, Jesse Snider, son of Twisted Sister's Dee Snider was selected as the new host of MTV2 Rock, replacing Abby Gennet. Another new program included Track 2, a series going "behind the scenes" of music videos, and Nose Dive, profiling past popular artists.

In May of that year, MTV2 relaunched the old MTV program Headbangers Ball, which featured a wide array of heavy metal and hard rock music videos. Metallica hosted the first episode, followed by Rob Zombie for the next few weeks.

In June, MTV2 began an eight-hour block of hip-hop programming on Sundays called Sucker Free Sunday. Each week, a different guest host served up Artist Collections, countdowns, and other hip-hop music specials. In July of that year, the channel also introduced a new advertising campaign – aimed at differentiating itself from its parent network, MTV – featuring The Talking Baby, a foul-mouthed baby doll operated by Charlotte-based comedian Sean Keenan.

Around this time, MTV2 sponsored two albums in the MTV2 Album Covers series, in which a band covers another band's songs. The first was Dashboard Confessional/R.E.M., and the second was Guster/Violent Femmes.

In early February 2004, MTV2 started to air Beavis and Butt-Head as a part of its regular programming and its MTV2OONS block, marking the first time the series had aired on TV in the US since around August 1999 on MTV.

=== 2005–2011: The two-headed dog ===
Early version of the current logo, used from 2005 to 2013. It was used by the Canadian version until the closure on March 29, 2024.

In 2005, MTV2 rebranded with a new logo: a two-headed Rottweiler dog. Billboard reported that the double heads of the dog were made to represent rock and hip-hop, the two sides of music on MTV2.

From February 2007, MTV2 began scaling down music programming as a result of its production staff being reduced. MTV2 would later devote Saturday evenings to rock music, usually during the primetime hours on Saturdays, but currently the block is shown on late Saturday evenings starting at 10:00 p.m. Other formats included a 30-minute block of videos that aired in the early mornings and late nights, as well as the No Break Video Hour, a music video block that excluded commercials, Tuesdays through Thursdays at 10:00 a.m.

MTV2 gave the cast of Human Giant free rein of the channel in May for an event called Human Giant: 24, allowing them to program the channel and host from MTV's Times Square studios as they see fit for 24 hours, from 12 p.m. on May 18 to 12 p.m. on May 19. Notable guests included Fred Armisen and Bill Hader from Saturday Night Live, Will Arnett, Michael Cera, Bob Odenkirk, Michael Showalter, Todd Barry, Zach Galifianakis, Tapes 'n Tapes, and Tegan and Sara. The live event was the successor to 24 Hours of Love in 2002, 24 Hours of Foo in 2005, and a subsequent Jackass special on MTV in early 2008.

Music programming was briefly expanded in June. From 4:30 p.m. on June 29 to 1:00 a.m. on July 1, 2007, MTV2 played strictly music videos, whether a general block of videos or a specific genre-based block such as Headbangers Ball (heavy metal) or Sucker Free (hip-hop), for 33 hours and 30 minutes. Throughout the month of July 2007, MTV2 broadcast music video programs during primetime Mondays through Thursdays in its efforts to play more music. In February 2008, MTV2 replaced the 10 p.m. Eastern rebroadcast of Elite 8 with a standard block of music videos.

2008 saw decreased availability for MTV2, as both Comcast and Cox Communications moved the channel from their widely received analog cable services to digital cable.

=== 2011–2017: Further success with original programming ===
In 2011, MTV debuted a new original series called Guy Code on November 15. The series closed out its first season as the highest-rated program in network history, amassing significant time period increases among MTV2's core male demographic with a 55% increase among men 12–34 and massive 188% increase in viewership among male teens, as well as a 44% increase among 12- to 34-year-olds overall. The second season of Guy Code closed out its sophomore run on September 25, 2012, as MTV2's highest-rated and most-watched original series ever.

Music programming was seen during the AMTV2 block, which aired Monday-Fridays from 4 to 9 a.m. AMTV2 was blocked in as "MTV2 Jams", which runs from 4AM-8AM Eastern, and "MTV2 Music Mix" (known on-air as Morning Music Buzz), which runs from 8AM-9AM Eastern. "Jams" primarily features hip-hop music videos, while "Music Mix" features a mixture of hip-hop, rock, and alternative videos.

On October 28, 2012, MTV2 relaunched its Sucker Free series as The Week in Jams, followed by additional airings on MTV Jams. Where Sucker Free Countdown focused primarily on music, the expanded focus of The Week in Jams includes interviews, fashion trends, music, sports and hip-hop lifestyle. MTV recruited a stable of hip hop contributors to serve as the hosts of The Week in Jams and to provide expert commentary across MTV's channels including: mixtape legend, radio personality and television host DJ Envy; industry insider, radio personality and cast member of MTV2's Guy Code Charlamagne Tha God; Motown Records recording artist and songwriter Sofi Green; insider Maestro; and radio personality and nationally syndicated nighttime radio host Nessa, to join MTV hip hop expert and MTV News correspondent, Sway Calloway. The show hasn't been seen on MTV2's schedule since late 2013.

MTV Clubland, an EDM block on the flagship network, premiered on March 30, 2013; it continued to be seen on AMTV.

MTV2 next debuted Nitro Circus Live, an original series featuring 17-time X Games medalist Travis Pastrana and his sports-adventure troupe bridging the gap between extreme sports and unabashed daredevil antics, on March 27, 2012 . The first season of Nitro Circus Live became MTV2's highest-rated original series among the network's core demographic of men 12–34 since 2006, delivering an average rating of .42 and a 50% time period increase versus the year prior. In addition, the first season improved its prior year time period by 27%.

On May 22, 2012, MTV2 premiered the comedic game show Hip Hop Squares, a revitalization of the iconic game show Hollywood Squares that featured an original style and personality tailor-made for the network's audience. The show stayed true to the tic-tac-toe format of the original game show, while infusing it with well-known personalities in hip-hop culture. A reboot of the series would premiere on VH1 in 2016. In addition, MTV2 brought back The Dub Magazine Project for a second season on October 28, 2012, to give viewers a unique and rarely seen glimpse into the lives and deepest obsessions of entertainment and sports personalities.

2013 saw MTV2 expand its original programming slate further with the premieres of Mac Miller and the Most Dope Family, the Guy Code spinoff, Guy Court; Ain't that America and Charlamagne and Friends. After a six-year hiatus, a revival of Wild 'n Out premiered on July 9, 2013. The premiere episode of season five had 1.1 million total viewers, the highest-rated telecast in the network's history. During this time, MTV2 introduced a new version of the "Two-Headed Dog" logo, with the channel's name rendered in a new font.

In 2014, MTV2 debuted Jobs That Don't Suck, a show spotlighting young entrepreneurs, and the weekly series Off the Bat from the MLB Fan Cave, created from MTV's partnership with Major League Baseball. On November 11, 2014, MTV2 renewed Wild n' Out & Guy Code and greenlit two new series: a comedic game show, MTV2's Joking Off, and a news satire series under the working title Number 2 News. Weeks after the announcement that the NBCUniversal-owned cable network, G4, will be shutting down, MTV2 began syndicating the Marvel Anime anthology, which previously aired on the former network.

Because of the popularity of MTV2's original programming, the network was listed as one of Comedy Hype's 20 Game Changers of Comedy of 2015. Joking Off premiered on April 1, 2015, and Number 2 News, renamed Not Exactly News, premiered on June 17, 2015. In the Summer of 2015, MTV2 debuted the reality series, Kingin' with Tyga, and panel show, Uncommon Sense with Charlamagne.

=== 2017–present: Viacom restructuring ===
Because of Viacom's 2017 restructuring, in which most of the company's resources were directed towards the flagship MTV network, MTV2 currently has no original programming. In the previous year, several of MTV2's remaining original programs moved to MTV.

As promotion for the 2025 MTV Video Music Awards, MTV2 scheduled a full week of only music video programming from September 1 to the night of the event on September 7, alongside MTV Classic, MTV Live, and MTV Biggest Pop on Pluto TV. It was the first time MTV2 had played music videos since 2017. The week was produced by Van Toffler and his studio Gunpowder & Sky.

== Programming ==
As of 2026, MTV2 primarily airs movies, acquired sitcoms and reality shows, as well as reruns of MTV programming and other shows from its sibling owned networks.

== Broadcast affiliates ==
From 2001 until 2015, MTV2 had a small network of terrestrial television affiliates that carried the network for free as a result of MTV's purchase of The Box in 2001. The broadcast network branch slowly thinned out as other parties purchased stations, with some leaving the air as a result of the digital transition dislocating those stations from their channel positions, and in most cases, the retransmission consent contracts for Viacom's networks, including MTV2, precluded these stations from having any cable or satellite carriage on their own, notwithstanding existing complications involving low-power stations and cable carriage. The over-the-air stations also created a side effect of requiring MTV2's programming to meet the FCC's broadcast safe harbor and in some cases, educational and informational programming requirements. Eventually, Viacom let their affiliation agreements lapse with their broadcast affiliates, and those other stations have become affiliates of other networks, or ceased all operations.

=== Former affiliates ===
City	Station	Station	Channel
Anchorage	Alaska	K56HV	56
Birmingham	Alabama	WBXA-CD	2.1
Sacramento	California	KEZT-CD	23
Denver	Colorado	K55IO	55
Gainesville	Florida	WBXG-LD	33
Jacksonville	Florida	WBXJ-CD	43.1
Orlando	Florida	WZXZ-CD	36
Tallahassee	Florida	WBXT-LD	43
Tampa–St. Petersburg	Florida	WARP-CD	20
Atlanta	Georgia	WIRE-CD	40
Savannah	Georgia	WXSX-LD	13
Boise	Idaho	KIWB-LD	43
Champaign	Illinois	WBXC-CD	46
Chicago	Illinois	WOCH-CD	28
Chicago	Illinois	WOCK-CD	4
Fort Wayne	Indiana	WFWC-CD	45
Indianapolis	Indiana	WBXI-CD	47
Louisville	Kentucky	WBXV-LD	13
Alexandria	Louisiana	K02QB	2
Baton Rouge	Louisiana	WBXH-CD	39
Baton Rouge	Louisiana	WCBZ-LP	7
Shreveport	Louisiana	KBXS-CD	20
Baltimore	Maryland	WMJF-CD	16
Boston	Massachusetts	WFXZ-CD	24
Detroit	Michigan	WUDT-LD	8
Minneapolis–Saint Paul	Minnesota	WUMN-LD	13
Jackson	Mississippi	WBXK-CA	8
Albuquerque	New Mexico	KRTN-LD	39
Buffalo	New York	WBXZ-LD	56
New York City	New York	WMBQ-CD	46
Syracuse	New York	WWLF-LD	35
Cleveland	Ohio	WRAP-LD	32
Steubenville	Ohio	WSSS-LP	29
Toledo	Ohio	WDMY-LD	38
Oklahoma City	Oklahoma	KOCY-LD	48
Oklahoma City	Oklahoma	KUOT-CD	19
Pittsburgh	Pennsylvania	WIIC-LD	29
Charleston	South Carolina	WCHD-CA	49
Nashville	Tennessee	WIIW-LD	14
Abilene	Texas	KLMH-LP	31
Amarillo	Texas	K24NR	45
Lubbock	Texas	KYLU-LP	49
Midland	Texas	K21GU	21
San Angelo	Texas	KZSA-LD	43
Victoria	Texas	KQZY-LD	38
Chesapeake	Virginia	WVAD-LD	25
Hampton	Virginia	WPEN-LP	68
Richmond	Virginia	WXOB-LP	17
Milwaukee	Wisconsin	WMKE-CD	21

== International versions ==
In addition to the original MTV2 channel in the United States, there have been a number of other MTV Networks channels around the world known as MTV2.

- Europe:
  - MTV Two in Europe initially was more focused on Indie and alternative music, playing music from Bjork, Unkle, Beastie Boys, Aphex Twin and many others. It was initially advertising free. It was launched alongside MTV Extra, MTV Dance, MTV Base, and MTV Rocks, which focused solely on alternative rock and indie, broadcast from Camden Studios, London.
- Canada: MTV2 in Canada was very similar to its American counterpart; however, it had VJs who host shows such as MTV2 Videos (music videos). The original incarnation of MTV2 featured a non-stop freeform mix of music videos as well as a select number of concert performances. It was replaced by PunchMuch (now known as Juicebox) in June 2005. It was closed on March 29, 2024.
- Germany: A version of MTV2 was replaced by Nick in September 2005. Unlike the original, MTV2 Pop was a mainstream channel. However, MTV Rocks is being offered by several pay-TV services.

== See also ==
- List of MTV channels
- List of programs broadcast by MTV2
- MTV
- MTV Classic
- MTVX
- mtvU
