= North Carolina Comedy Arts Festival =

American comedy festival (2001–2017)

Coordinates: 36.0780°N 79.7913°W

The North Carolina Comedy Arts Festival was an annual comedy festival in Carrboro, North Carolina, United States.

The festival was started in 2001 by Zach Ward (of Dirty South Improv Comedy Theater, better known locally as DSI) as an improv showcase and series of improv seminars for aspiring comedians. The festival grew larger each year until 2017. In 2009, it added stand-up comedy. In 2010, it expanded to include sketch comedy and film as well as extending into a month-long festival in Chapel Hill and adjacent Carrboro, North Carolina. The annual festival, and DSI Comedy Theater, closed in 2017 after Zach Ward was accused of sexual harassment, wage discrimination, and other discriminatory practices.
