= America's Best Dance Crew season 8 =

America's Best Dance Crew
- Season 8
- Hosted by: Jason Dundas
- Judges: T-Pain; Teyana Taylor; Frankie Grande
- Winner: Quest Crew

Release
- Original network: MTV
- Original release: July 29 – August 29, 2015

Season chronology
- ← Previous; Season 7

America's Best Dance Crew All-Stars: Road to the VMAs was the eighth season of the competitive dance reality television series America's Best Dance Crew. The revival of the series was announced by MTV on January 10, 2015, following the show's cancellation in 2012. The season, which premiered on July 29, 2015, was hosted by television presenter Jason Dundas. The season consisted of six MTV Video Music Award–themed episodes; the winner was crowned in a live episode finale airing before the 2015 MTV Video Music Awards. Hip hop artist T-Pain, recording artist Teyana Taylor, and Broadway performer Frankie Grande formed the new judging panel.

== Cast ==
The eighth season of America's Best Dance Crew features six dance crews, including five previous winners. The past champions are joined by one new dance crew, which includes members from Season 1 winner JabbaWockeeZ and fellow competitors Kaba Modern.

Dance Crew	Hometown	Season
Kinjaz	Los Angeles, California	-
Super CR3W	Las Vegas, Nevada	2
Quest Crew	Artesia, California	3
We Are Heroes	Los Angeles, California	4
I.aM.mE	Houston, Texas	6
Elektrolytes	Gilbert, Arizona	7

== Results ==
Rank	Dance Crew	Episode					
Rank	Dance Crew	1	2	3	4	5^{2}	6
1	Quest Crew	IN	IN	RISK	RISK	IN	WINNER
2	Kinjaz	IN	IN	IN	IN	IN	RUNNER-UP
3	Super CR3W	IN	IN	IN	IN	IN	OUT
4	I.aM.mE	IN	IN	IN	OUT		
5	Elektrolytes	IN	RISK^{1}	OUT			
6	We Are Heroes	RISK^{1}	OUT^{1}				

^Note 1: The bottom crew from the first episode battled the bottom crew from the second episode to determine the first elimination of the season.
^Note 2: All three crews advanced to the final episode.

Key
(WINNER) The dance crew won the competition and was crowned "America's Best Dance Crew All-Star Champion".
(RUNNER-UP) The dance crew was the runner-up in the competition.
(IN) The dance crew was safe from elimination.
(RISK) The dance crew was at risk for elimination.
(OUT) The dance crew was eliminated from the competition.

== Episodes ==
=== Episode 1: All-Star Showdown ===
- Original Airdate: July 29, 2015

The season kicked off with all six crews dancing alongside American R&B singer, Ne-Yo, to a medley of his own songs including '"She Knows", "Coming with You", and "Time of Our Lives". Then, the crews incorporated hits from VMA-nominated artists into their routines. All six crews advanced to the next round, but We Are Heroes were put at risk and set to face elimination against another crew in the next episode.

Dance Crew	Song
Super CR3W	"Latch" by Disclosure feat. Sam Smith
I.aM.mE	"Work" Jayden vonnonnlly Iggy Azalea
Elektrolytes	"Big Bad Wolf" by Duck Sauce
Kinjaz	"Fine China" by Chris Brown
We Are Heroes	"Diamonds" by Rihanna
Quest Crew	"Runaway Baby" by Bruno Mars

- Safe: Super CR3W, I.aM.mE, Elektrolytes, Kinjaz, Quest Crew
- Bottom: We Are Heroes

=== Episode 2: VMA Icons Challenge ===
- Original Airdate: August 5, 2015

The episode started off with all six crews dancing to a master mix of "Started from the Bottom" by Canadian rapper Drake. Then, each crew was assigned a VMA Icon and chose a track from their legendary catalog.

Dance Crew	Song
I.aM.mE	"Birthday" by Katy Perry
Kinjaz	"OMG" by Usher feat. will.i.am
Super CR3W	"Uptown Funk" by Mark Ronson feat. Bruno Mars
Quest Crew	"Turn Up the Music" by Chris Brown
We Are Heroes	"Get Ur Freak On" by Missy Elliott
Elektrolytes	"Want To Want Me" by Jason Derulo

- Safe: I.aM.mE, Super CR3W, Kinjaz, Quest Crew
- Bottom 2: We Are Heroes, Elektrolytes
- Eliminated: We Are Heroes

=== Episode 3: VMA Fashion Challenge ===
- Original Airdate: August 12, 2015

The episode started off with the remaining crews performing a martial arts-inspired dance to a master mix of "Bad Blood" by Taylor Swift featuring Kendrick Lamar. The crews were then given a challenge to incorporate fashion and wardrobe into their routines.

Dance Crew	Song
Super CR3W	"Baby Baby" by Tropkillaz
Kinjaz	"Turn Down for What" by DJ Snake and Lil Jon
I.aM.mE	"Dance of the Sugar Plum Fairy" by Pentatonix
Elektrolytes	"Feel Right" by Mark Ronson feat. Mystikal
Quest Crew	"Bang Bang" by Jessie J, Ariana Grande and Nicki Minaj

- Safe: Super CR3W, Kinjaz, I.aM.mE
- Bottom 2: Elektrolytes, Quest Crew
- Eliminated: Elektrolytes

=== Episode 4: Crews' Control Challenge ===
- Original Airdate: August 19, 2015

The four remaining crews competed against each other in two challenges: the VMA Megacrew Challenge, in which each crew was split into teams of two and given the task of creating a routine that would keep them from the bottom two, and the Crews' Control Challenge, where the remaining crews were given artistic freedom to create a routine that would save them from elimination.

At the end of the episode, Di "Moon" Zhang of I.aM.mE proposed to his girlfriend on stage, to which she accepted and the couple became engaged.

==== Challenge #1 ====
The remaining four crews were split into two teams of two crews and each team was given the task to create a unique dance number together. The crews in the team chosen by the judges would be safe, while the other team would make up the bottom two for the next challenge.

Dance Crews	Song
Super CR3W & Kinjaz	"Lean On" by Major Lazer feat. DJ Snake and MØ
I.aM.mE & Quest Crew	"The Saints" by Andy Mineo feat. KB and Trip Lee

==== Challenge #2 ====
The four remaining crews were given full freedom to use lighting, camera work, stage layout, etc. to create a unique performance of their very own.

Dance Crew	Song
Kinjaz	"Dance Box" by KRNFX
Super CR3W	"i" by Kendrick Lamar
I.aM.mE	"Fire Power" by Wolfgang Gartner
Quest Crew	"Take Ü There" by Jack Ü feat. Kiesza

- Safe: Kinjaz, Super CR3W
- Bottom 2: I.aM.mE, Quest Crew
- Eliminated: I.aM.mE

=== Episode 5: Semi Finals ===
- Original Airdate: August 26, 2015

The three remaining crews competed against each other in two challenges: the VMA Nominee Challenge, where they chose a VMA-nominated song to perform to in order to stay safe from elimination this week, and the Final Statement Challenge, where, like previous seasons' Last Chance Challenge, the crews chose a song to perform to in a bid to win the competition.

In a surprise twist, it was revealed the judges made the decision of sending all three remaining crews straight to the finale.

==== Challenge #1 ====
The remaining three crews chose a VMA-nominated song to perform a routine to in order to advance to the finals.

Dance Crew	Song
Quest Crew	"Shut Up & Dance" by Walk the Moon
Kinjaz	"Earned It" by The Weeknd
Super CR3W	"Where Are U Now" by Jack Ü feat. Justin Bieber

==== Challenge #2 ====
Similar to previous seasons, the remaining three crews were given one last chance to perform before voting lines opened up for the finale.

Dance Crew	Song
Quest Crew	"Febreze" by Jack Ü feat. 2 Chainz
Kinjaz	"OG" by Troyboi
Super CR3W	"Block Rockin' Beats" by The Chemical Brothers

=== Episode 6: Finale ===
- Original Airdate: August 29, 2015

The episode started off with the remaining three finalists dancing alongside the eliminated crews to a master mix of "All That" by Dillon Francis featuring Twista and The Rej3ctz. The three finalists then performed one last routine before the winner was officially announced.

Dance Crew	Song
Quest Crew	"SummerThing!" by Afrojack feat. Mike Taylor
Super CR3W	"Judgement Day" by Method Man
Kinjaz	"I See Fire" by Ed Sheeran
Elektrolytes, We Are Heroes, and I.aM.mE	"Manolo" by Trip Lee feat. Lecrae > "Bitch Better Have My Money" by Rihanna > "Hey Mama" by David Guetta feat. Nicki Minaj

- Eliminated: Super CR3W
- Runner-Up: Kinjaz
- Winner: Quest Crew
