= America's Best Dance Crew season 4 =

America's Best Dance Crew
- Season 4
- Hosted by: Mario Lopez
- Judges: JC Chasez; Lil Mama; Shane Sparks
- Winner: We Are Heroes

Release
- Original network: MTV
- Original release: August 9 – September 27, 2009

Season chronology
- ← Previous; Season 3 Next → Season 5

The fourth season of America's Best Dance Crew premiered on August 9, 2009. All three regular judges, host Mario Lopez, and backstage correspondent Layla Kayleigh returned. This was the last season to feature Shane Sparks as a judge. In the live finale, which aired on September 27, 2009, We Are Heroes was declared the winner.

== Cast ==
Dance Crew	Hometown	Region
AfroBoriké	Las Vegas, Nevada	West
Artistry in Motion	North Hollywood, California	West
Beat Ya Feet Kings	Washington, D.C.	East
Fr3sh	Matawan, New Jersey	East
Massive Monkees	Seattle, Washington	West
Rhythm City	Bronx, New York	East
Southern Movement	Nashville, Tennessee	South
Vogue Evolution	New York, New York	East
We Are Heroes	Los Angeles, California	West

== Results ==
Rank	Dance Crew	Episode							
Rank	Dance Crew	1	2	3	4	5	6	7	8
1	We Are Heroes	IN	IN	IN	RISK	RISK	IN	RISK	WINNER
2	AfroBoriké	IN	RISK	IN	IN	IN	IN	IN	RUNNER-UP
3	Massive Monkees	IN	IN	IN	IN	IN	RISK	OUT	
4	Rhythm City	IN	IN	RISK	IN	IN	OUT		
5	Vogue Evolution	IN	IN	IN	IN	OUT			
6	Beat Ya Feet Kings	RISK	IN	IN	OUT				
7	Southern Movement	RISK	IN	OUT					
8	Artistry in Motion	IN	OUT						
9	Fr3sh	OUT							

Key
(WINNER) The dance crew won the competition and was crowned "America's Best Dance Crew".
(RUNNER-UP) The dance crew was the runner-up in the competition.
(IN) The dance crew was safe from elimination.
(RISK) The dance crew was at risk for elimination.
(OUT) The dance crew was eliminated from the competition.

== Episodes ==
=== Episode 1: Crew's Choice Challenge ===
- Original Airdate: August 9, 2009

The nine new crews chose songs that best showcased their talent in the season premiere. After the bottom three was chosen by the judges, the crews had to face each other in a dance battle to "Boom Boom Pow" by The Black Eyed Peas.

Dance Crew	Song
Beat Ya Feet Kings	"Skillet" by Backyard Band
We Are Heroes	"Waters of Nazareth" by Justice
AfroBoriké	"Aguanile" by Marc Anthony
Massive Monkees	"Kill Joy" by N.E.R.D.
Artistry in Motion	"SFM" by Basement Jaxx
Southern Movement	"Sideways" by Dierks Bentley
Rhythm City	"Life of a Star" by Mims
Fr3sh	"Ante Up" by M.O.P.
Vogue Evolution	"Took the Night" by Chelley

- Safe: We Are Heroes, AfroBoriké, Massive Monkees, Artistry in Motion, Rhythm City, Vogue Evolution
- Bottom 3: Beat Ya Feet Kings, Southern Movement, Fr3sh
- Eliminated: Fr3sh

=== Episode 2: Beyoncé Challenge ===
- Original Airdate: August 16, 2009

Beyoncé stopped by to hand out the challenges for the crews, who had to use her music videos and tour performances as inspiration for their routines.

Dance Crew	Song	Challenge
We Are Heroes	"Single Ladies (Put a Ring on It)"	Take the section of the video known as "The Grind" and create strobe effects.
Rhythm City	"Sweet Dreams"	Update "The Charleston" which is featured in the video.
Massive Monkees	"Work It Out"	Dance with hula hoops without accidentally dropping them.
Beat Ya Feet Kings	"Crazy In Love"	Booty-pop with never before seen flare.
Southern Movement	"Jumpin' Jumpin'" by Destiny's Child	Bust out all of the moves from the video with new creativity.
Vogue Evolution	"Déjà Vu"	Perform African-style dancing within their routine.
Artistry in Motion	"Diva"	Perform with chains incorporating the entire crew.
AfroBoriké	"Beautiful Liar" by Beyoncé and Shakira	Work exotic Shakira-like moves into the routine.

- Safe: We Are Heroes, Rhythm City, Massive Monkees, Beat Ya Feet Kings, Southern Movement, Vogue Evolution
- Bottom 2: Artistry in Motion, AfroBoriké
- Eliminated: Artistry in Motion

=== Episode 3: Martial Arts Challenge ===
- Original Airdate: August 23, 2009

The crews had to incorporate martial arts moves into their routines. Quest Crew's Steve Terada appeared as a guest instructor.

Dance Crew	Song	Challenge
AfroBoriké	"I Know You Want Me (Calle Ocho)" by Pitbull	Capoeira
We Are Heroes	"Starstrukk" by 3OH!3	Karate
Vogue Evolution	"Work" by Ciara feat. Missy Elliott	Shaolin Kung Fu
Massive Monkees	"Bounce" by MSTRKRFT feat. NORE	Extreme Martial Arts
Beat Ya Feet Kings	"Chillin'" by Wale feat. Lady Gaga	Taekwondo
Rhythm City	"La La La" by LMFAO	Muay Thai
Southern Movement	"Ugly" by Bubba Sparxxx	Kali

- Safe: AfroBoriké, We Are Heroes, Vogue Evolution, Massive Monkees, Beat Ya Feet Kings
- Bottom 2: Rhythm City, Southern Movement
- Eliminated: Southern Movement

=== Episode 4: Bollywood Challenge ===
- Original Airdate: August 30, 2009

The six remaining crews were challenged to infuse the flavor of Bollywood culture into their routines. In order to learn the complex Indian-themed dance style, the crews met with Bollywood choreographer Nakul Dev Mahajan.

Dance Crew	Song	Challenge
Massive Monkees	"Bang" by Rye Rye feat. M.I.A.	Bhangra
Vogue Evolution	"Calabria 2008" by Enur	Rajasthani
Rhythm City	"Jai Ho! (You Are My Destiny)" by A.R. Rahman and The Pussycat Dolls	Bharatanatyam
AfroBoriké	"Dance Bailalo" by Kat DeLuna	Kathak
We Are Heroes	"Arab Money" by Busta Rhymes and Ron Browz	Giddha
Beat Ya Feet Kings	"So Fine" by Sean Paul	Garba

- Safe: Massive Monkees, Vogue Evolution, Rhythm City, AfroBoriké
- Bottom 2: We Are Heroes, Beat Ya Feet Kings
- Eliminated: Beat Ya Feet Kings

=== Episode 5: Dance Craze Challenge ===
- Original Airdate: September 6, 2009

The five remaining crews put their own spins on popular dance crazes. In addition to the challenge, the crews also had used the trampoline built into the stage sometime during their routines.

Dance Crew	Song	Challenge
AfroBoriké	"Swag Surfin'" by Fast Life Yungstaz	Swag Surfin'
Massive Monkees	"Do the Ricky Bobby" by B-Hamp	Ricky Bobby
Rhythm City	"You're a Jerk" by New Boyz	Jerkin'
We Are Heroes	"Stanky Legg" by GS Boyz	Stanky Legg
Vogue Evolution	"Halle Berry" by Hurricane Chris	Halle Berry

- Safe: AfroBoriké, Massive Monkees, Rhythm City
- Bottom 2: We Are Heroes, Vogue Evolution
- Eliminated: Vogue Evolution

=== Episode 6: VMA Challenge ===
- Original Airdate: September 13, 2009

The final four crews paid tribute to memorable performances from the MTV Video Music Awards. The crews performed together in an opening number to "Smooth Criminal" by Michael Jackson.

Dance Crew	Song
We Are Heroes	"Vogue" by Madonna
AfroBoriké	"I'm a Slave 4 U" by Britney Spears
Massive Monkees	"Tearin' Up My Heart" by *NSYNC
Rhythm City	"Wall To Wall" by Chris Brown

- Safe: We Are Heroes, AfroBoriké
- Bottom 2: Massive Monkees, Rhythm City
- Eliminated: Rhythm City

=== Episode 7: Decades of Dance Challenge ===
- Original Airdate: September 20, 2009

The crews competed against each other in two challenges: the Decade of Dance Challenge, in which the crews danced to a mix of five songs from the past five decades, and the Last Chance Challenge.

==== Challenge #1: Decades of Dance Challenge ====
The remaining three crews had to master dance styles from the last five decades. One crew was eliminated halfway through the show.

Decade	Song
1960s	"Sex Machine" by James Brown
1970s	"Uprock" by Rock Steady Crew
1980s	"Cold Hearted" by Paula Abdul
1990s	"You Make Me Wanna" by Usher
2000s	"LoveGame" by Lady Gaga

- Safe: AfroBoriké
- Bottom 2: Massive Monkees, We Are Heroes
- Eliminated: Massive Monkees

==== Challenge #2: Last Chance Challenge ====
The two finalists were given one last chance to perform before the lines opened for the final voting session of the season.

Dance Crew	Performance Title
AfroBoriké	Raíces
We Are Heroes	Ichiban

=== Episode 8: The Live Finale ===
- Original Airdate: September 27, 2009

All nine crews returned for a group performance in the season finale. The judges each picked three crews that complemented each other and their dance styles. Then, the winner was crowned.

Crews	Song
Lil Mama: We Are Heroes, Vogue Evolution and Artistry in Motion	"Girls On The Dance Floor" by Far East Movement feat. The Stereotypes
JC Chasez: AfroBoriké, Rhythm City and Fr3sh	"Fire Burning" by Sean Kingston
Shane Sparks: Massive Monkees, Beat Ya Feet Kings and Southern Movement	"I Do" by Lil Jon feat. Swizz Beatz and Snoop Dogg
We Are Heroes and AfroBoriké	"I Gotta Feeling" by The Black Eyed Peas
We Are Heroes	"I'm The Ish" by DJ Class feat. Lil Jon

- Winner: We Are Heroes
- Runner-up: AfroBoriké
