= Hokuto Konishi =

Japanese-American dancer (born 1984)

- Born: July 11, 1984 (age 41); Tokyo, Japan
- Occupations: Breakdancer, choreographer, television personality
- Years active: 1999–present
- Spouse: Gina Atkinson
- Career
- Current group: Quest Crew
- Former groups: SickStep

Hokuto Konishi (born July 11, 1984), also known as Hok or Falcon, is a Japanese-British breakdancer, choreographer, and television personality. Konishi is a member of the American hip-hop dance crew, Quest Crew and he was also a contestant on the Third Season of the American reality television show So You Think You Can Dance.

Konishi's Season 3 performance on So You Think You Can Dance – Hummingbird and Flower – choreographed by Wade Robson, won the Primetime Emmy Award for Outstanding Choreography in 2008. He was a student in graphic design at Santa Monica College. Konishi also appeared in the 2009 American jukebox musical comedy film Alvin and the Chipmunks: The Squeakquel, as a hip-hop dancer participating in a music competition. He is the choreographer of LMFAO's "Party Rock Anthem" and "Champagne Showers" music videos.

Konishi is a judge on the CBS talent competition The World's Best representing the country of Japan.

== So You Think You Can Dance ==
Konishi is a breakdancer and has also appeared on So You Think You Can Dance in Seasons One, Two, and Three. In Season Two Konishi nearly made it to the top twenty, but with only a student visa, he was unable to be legally employed in the United States, which resulted in his dismissal from the program. Subsequently, he obtained a work permit and became eligible to participate in Season Three, however, he was sent home from the show by the judges on July 19, 2007.

Konishi is best known for his breakdancing moves and he was formerly a member of the dance troupe SickStep. He appeared with SickStep in the Season Two auditions and was the final member to make it through to the Vegas stage. As of 2007, he is a member of a breaking crew called Quest Crew, which competes and performs in various venues in California.

== Personal life ==
Born in Tokyo, Konishi is of Japanese descent, but grew up in Oxford, England. He is a graduate in graphic design at Santa Monica College. He trained for two years in hip-hop and locking and he began to learn dance at the age of 15.

Konishi married hair stylist Gina Atkinson in 2022. Konishi is friends with So You Think You Can Dance Season One contestant Ryan Conferido;and Season Three contestant Dominic Sandoval, they are all members of Quest Crew.
