= Dominic Sandoval =

American dancer and internet personality

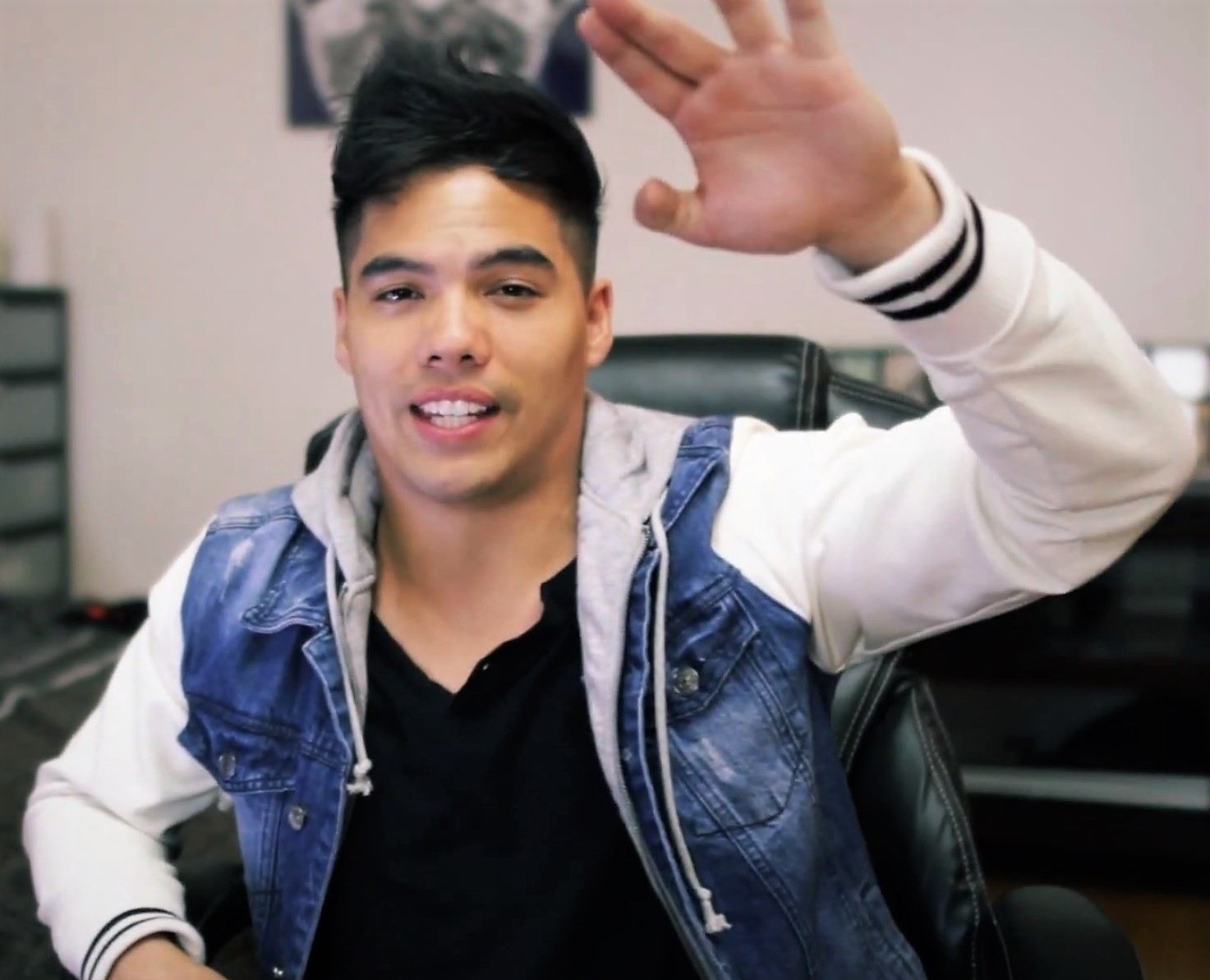
- Sandoval in a 2014 YouTube video
- Born: Dominic Kyle Sandoval; October 15, 1985 (age 41); Roseville, California, U.S.
- Other name: D-Trix
- Occupations: Dancer; YouTube personality; television personality; actor
- Years active: 2007–present

Dominic Kyle Sandoval (born October 15, 1985), better known as D-Trix, is an American dancer, YouTube personality, television personality, and actor. He is a member of Quest Crew and former member of Fallen Kingz.

Sandoval was a contestant on the third season of So You Think You Can Dance, in which he was the seventh male contestant and in gender the overall quarterfinalist to be eliminated. He then won the third season of America's Best Dance Crew as a part of Quest Crew. After his win, he became a judge on the show. In 2012, Sandoval became the host of the online web series Dance Showdown. In 2019, Sandoval returned to So You Think You Can Dance as a judge on the 16th season.

He was also one of the choreographers for the World of Dance season 2 winning team, The Lab along with Valerie Ramirez, the owner of The Lab Creative Arts Studio, Carrie Calkins, and several other crews.

In 2016, Sandoval won the Primetime Emmy Award for Outstanding Choreography at the 68th Primetime Creative Arts Emmy Awards, with Quest Crew.

== Early life ==
Sandoval was born in Roseville, California to Filipino American parents. He is a Filipino American. He was adopted by his stepfather Conrad Pete Sandoval at the age of two. However, the documents were mixed up and he became Conrad Pete Dominic Sandoval. He changed it to his current name when he was 16. He grew up in Roseville and graduated from Woodcreek High School in 2003.

== Dance career ==
He began breakdancing at age 13 and has performed at NBA and WNBA games, as well as won the 2005 "Evolution 2" competition held in Orlando, Florida with his breaking crew, Flexible Flav. Three months before the Los Angeles auditions, in order to prepare, Sandoval took hip-hop and choreography classes. He lists Ivan "The Urban Action Figure"—who has appeared on America's Got Talent—as his favorite professional dancer. Sandoval aspires to learn all styles and genres of dance and to be known as a dancer, rather than just a breaker.

=== So You Think You Can Dance ===
On the dance show So You Think You Can Dance, he was known for having a crush on host Cat Deeley, his humor and seemingly constantly dropping his partner, Sabra Johnson in Hairspray group routine, where she was accidentally dropped on her head. He was eliminated on August 2, 2007, and went on tour with the show. He was an All-Star in Season 7, and returned in 2019 in season 16 as a guest judge.

=== America's Best Dance Crew ===
Sandoval was a part of the dance crew Quest Crew, who won America's Best Dance Crew Season 3. Sandoval later announced that he would join America's Best Dance Crew's judging panel for its sixth season. Dominic rejoined Quest in 2014 and participated along with the rest of the crew in America’s Best Dance Crew All-Stars: Road to the VMAs. Quest Crew was voted America's Best Dance Crew for the second time.

He also recently choreographed for The Lab, a team from West Covina, California, which participated in and ultimately won World of Dance 2018. He has also appeared in the music video for 'Ready To Go (Get Me Out Of My Mind)' by Panic! At The Disco as a background dancer.

== YouTube career ==
Sandoval goes by the name "D-Trix" in his YouTube career. He has two YouTube accounts: "RANDOMinicSHOW" and "theDOMINICshow". As of July 2021, "theDOMINICshow" has over 3,450,000 subscribers. The defunct second channel, "RANDOMinicSHOW", now "RANDOM GUYS" had over 850,000 subscribers. Sandoval has appeared in several nigahiga videos, along with fellow Quest member Victor Kim. He often collaborates with friend and fellow YouTuber, Gabbie Hanna.

Sandoval published a song in October 2013, called "The Worst Babysitter Ever", to go with his new iTunes record deal.

Sandoval was a guest judge on the first season of Internet Icon and is the host of the online web series Dance Showdown.

In 2015, Sandoval won a YouTube Streamy in the "Dance" category at the 5th Streamy Awards.

== Acting career ==
Sandoval starred as the main antagonist, Melvin, in the 2010 short film Agents of Secret Stuff by Wong Fu Productions. Two years later, he starred alongside Chris Brown in the 2013 film Battle of the Year, which was released on September 20. He also appeared in Alvin and the Chipmunks: The Squeakquel as a background dancer. He also appeared in Smosh: The Movie as a nearby student every time Anthony Padilla hits someone using a mop.

== Awards and nominations ==
Year	Association	Category	Nominee/Work	Result	Ref.
2015	World Choreography Awards	Concert Dance Performance	World of Dance FrontRow LA '14 (with Quest Crew)	Won	
2015	Streamy Awards	Best Dance	Dominic "D-Trix" Sandoval	Won	
2016	Streamy Awards	Best Dance	Dominic "D-Trix" Sandoval	Won	
2016	Streamy Awards	Best Brand Campaign	“Now Add A Dancer,” Dominic “D-trix” Sandoval (Mountain Dew)	Nominated	
2016	World Choreography Awards	Live Stage Performance	Hit The Floor Lévis 2015 (with Quest Crew)	Won	
2016	Primetime Creative Arts Emmy	Outstanding Choreography	"Runaway Baby", "Take U There", "Summer Thing" (with Quest Crew)	Won	

== Personal life ==
Since April 2017, Sandoval has been in a relationship with fellow YouTuber Bethany Mota.
