= Urban Street Jam =

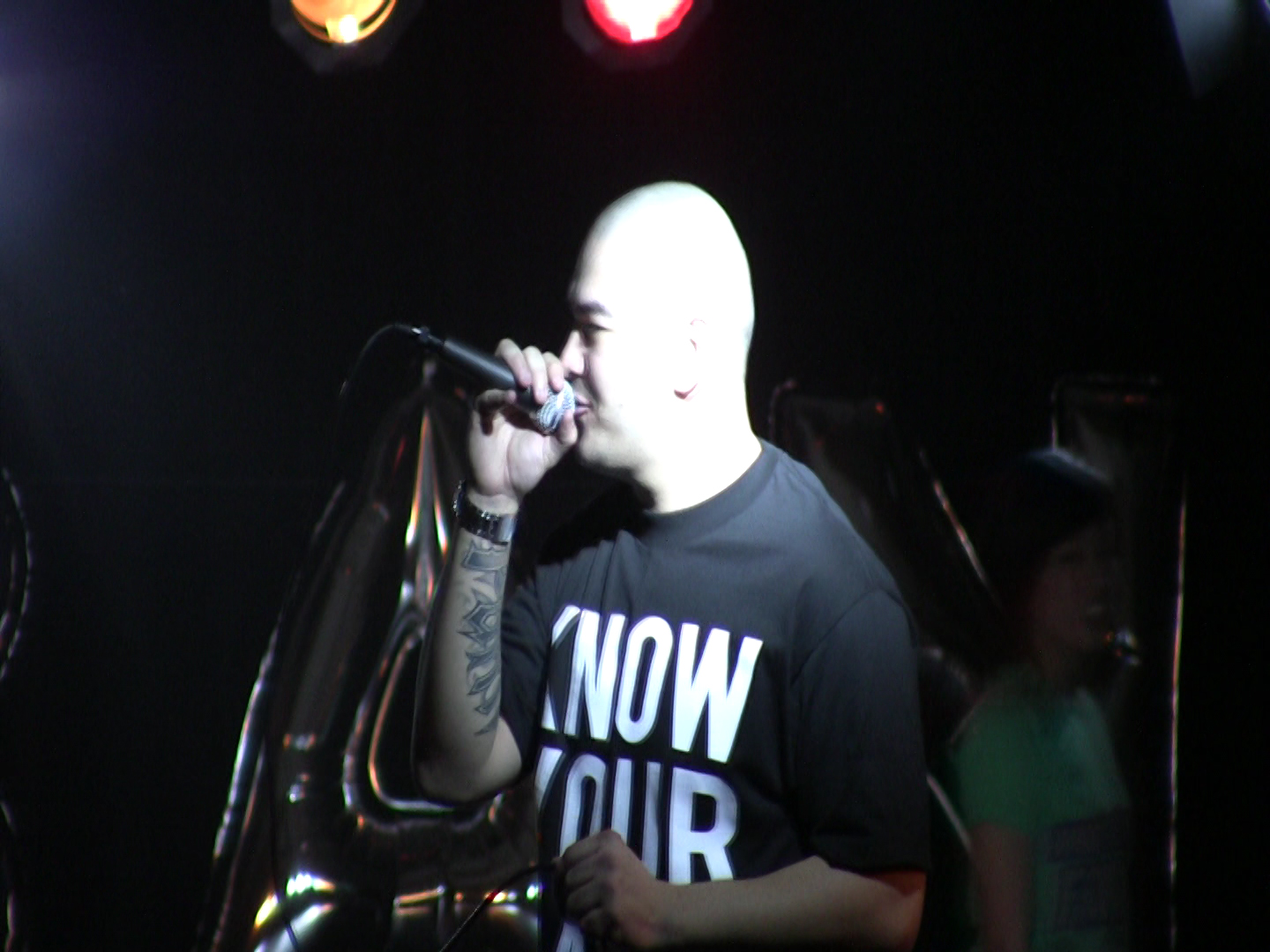
- Genre: hip hop culture festival
- Frequency: annual
- Location: Irvine, California
- Founded: 2010
- Website: urbanstreetjam.com

Urban Street Jam is an annual hip-hop culture festival that showcases music, art, dance, and fashion in the hip-hop community.

== History ==
Craig Borja of Phaze1 Entertainment/owner and producer along with Marlon Shell of Stylz Dance Studio/Co owner and producer of Urban Street Jams first annual event was held on February 20, 2010, Urban Street Jam's original venue was scheduled to be outdoors at Verizon Wireless Amphitheatre (Irvine) at the Hidden Valley Park, but due to weather, the venue was changed last minute to Hilton Hotel in Costa Mesa, California. Urban Street Jam had a fashion show, choreography dance competition, 2 vs 2 all stylz dance battle, bboy dance competition, clothing venues, viewers choice battle, graffiti showcase and import show cars. Also, Stephen "Twitch" Boss from So You Think You Can Dance taught a dance workshop at the event.

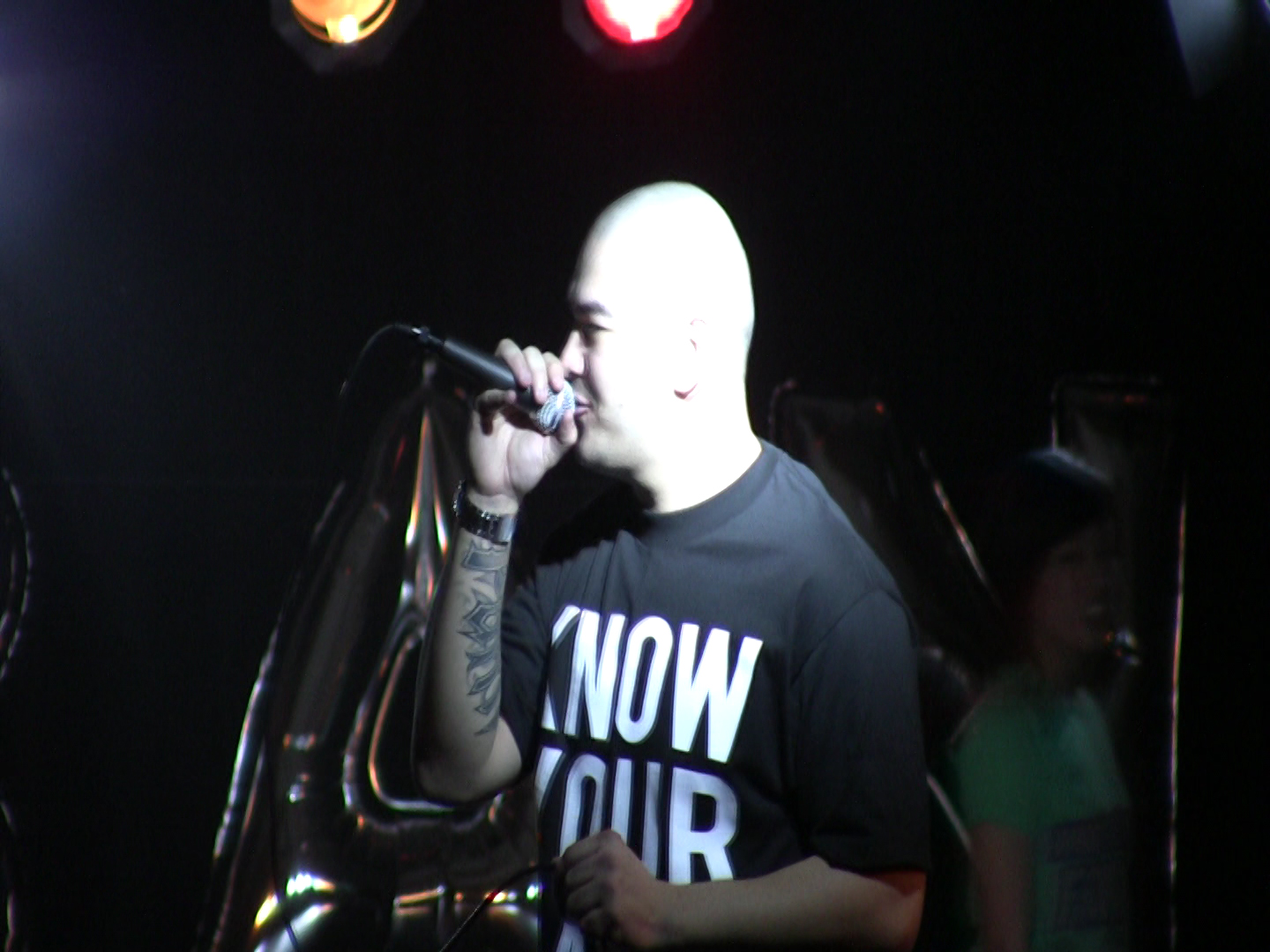
Myron Marten

=== Hosts ===
The entire festival was hosted by Stylz Dance Studio in Covina, California and Phaze1 Entertainment. Emcees include 21XL Production's Myron Marten and Sick Step Dance Crew's Mookie, who have both hosted Vibe Dance Competition. Sponsors include Power 106, World of Dance, and Hip Hop International, BOOGIEZONE.COM, Kallusive Clothing, DanceTag.tv, and Clubbing411.

=== Performers ===
Several celebrities in the dance community have performed for this event including those from America's Best Dance Crew and So You Think You Can Dance. Dancers include Stephen "Twitch" Boss, Dominic "D-Trix" Sandoval of Quest Crew, Hokuto "Hok" Konishi of Quest Crew, RJ KoolRaul of Supreme Soul, Smart Mark and Lil-O of Phresh Select, Kaba Modern Legacy, Mike Song and Victor Kim of Quest Crew.

== Winners ==
2010

=== Choreography Dance Competition ===
- 1st: Common Ground from Irvine, California
- 2nd: 220 from San Diego, California
- 3rd: Main Ingredient from Los Angeles, California

=== All Stylz Dance Battle ===
- Mike Song of Kaba Modern and Victor Kim of Quest Crew
- D-Trix of Quest Crew and Hok of Quest Crew
- Smart Mark of Phresh Select/AOP and Lil-O of Phresh Select/AOP

2011

=== Choreography Dance Competition ===
- 1st: Choreo Cookies from Oceanside, California
- 2nd: Academy of Villains Northern California
- 3rd: Jungle Boogie from Atlanta, Georgia

=== All Stylz Battle Dance Battle ===
- 1st: Miss Funk, Breeze Lee, & Full-Out of VersaStyle Dance Company

== See also ==
- List of hip hop music festivals
- Hip hop culture
