= Quest Crew =

American hip-hop dance crew

- Origin: Artesia, California, United States
- Genres: B-boying, hip-hop dance
- Years active: 2006–2020
- Past members: Hokuto Konishi; Steve Terada; Ryan "Ryanimay" Conferido; Dominic "D-Trix" Sandoval; Ryan Feng; Brian Hirano; Aris "FreakinAris" Paracuelles; Rudy "Ru" Reynon; Joe "Jolee" Lee; Mark Villaver; Subin Choi; Bronson "Browny" Chinen; Teejay Lee; Victor "King" Kim; Andy "Rocket-Man" Luo; Lydia Paek; Aichi "Spinboy" Ono; Nick "Nicky T" Teti; Adil "Beyond" Khan
- Website: www.youtube.com/user/QuestDanceCrew

Quest Crew is an American hip-hop dance crew from Los Angeles, California who were declared winners of the third season of America's Best Dance Crew. They made their first few appearances individually on shows like So You Think You Can Dance and at events such as Kollaboration 8 and World of Dance. They helped with the choreography for well-known duo LMFAO and have previously toured with them as well.

On August 29, 2015, Quest Crew was declared all-star champions of Season 8 of America's Best Dance Crew (ABDC) receiving $100,000 and the ABDC trophy again. This is the crew's second time being declared champion of MTV's hit show.

In 2016, the group won the Primetime Emmy Award for Outstanding Choreography at the 68th Primetime Creative Arts Emmy Awards.

== History ==
The name "Quest Crew" reflects the support that the Quest Learning Center, located in Artesia, California, has had on growth within the team and individually. Quest Crew won the title of America's Best Dance Crew on the third season of the show and consists of eleven members. Team members originally performed with the SickStep dance troupe, but later disbanded to recreate and include dancers to form Quest. D-Trix and Victor Kim are also part of the b-boy crew Fallen Kings, formally known as Flexible Flave, which won Freestyle session.

The entire crew appeared in the Far East Movement music video "Dance Like Michael Jackson" and LMFAO's "Party Rock Anthem", "Champagne Showers", "Sexy And I Know It" and "Sorry for Party Rocking". Quest Crew also performed on Idol Gives Back in 2008.

== Members ==
- Hokuto Konishi appeared on the third season of So You Think You Can Dance, choreographed "Party Rock Anthem" and "Sexy and I Know It" and is seen in "Champagne Showers" and "Sorry for Party Rocking" by LMFAO. He also appeared and performed Steve Terada's martial arts choreography in "Fine China" by Chris Brown.
- Steve Terada is a well-established extreme martial artist and tricker. He appeared in The Black Eyed Peas' "Pump It" music video and has also appeared in the film Memoirs of a Geisha. He was also part of LMFAO's "Party Rock Anthem".
- Ryan "Ryanimay" Conferido appeared on the first season of So You Think You Can Dance. He was also part of LMFAO's "Party Rock Anthem", "Sorry for Party Rocking", "Champagne Showers" and "Sexy And I Know It".
- Dominic "D-Trix" Sandoval appeared on the third season of So You Think You Can Dance along with Hokuto Konishi and returned in season seven as an All-Star. He was a judge for America's Best Dance Crew, and was a member of YTF alongside Victor Kim, Kevin Wu (KevJumba), Ryan Higa (NigaHiga), Chester See, Andrew Garcia and JR Aquino. He also has his own YouTube channel 'the DOMINIC show' which has over 3 million subscribers. In addition, he has appeared in several Nigahiga YouTube videos.In 2019 he was a judge in So you Think You can dancer's season 16
- Brian Hirano has appeared in the Natasha Bedingfield music video "Pocketful Of Sunshine". Brian Hirano is also featured in the Colby O'Donis music video for "What You Got". Seen in "Champagne Showers" and "Sorry for Party Rocking music videos by LMFAO. Performed with the rest of the crew for LMFAO's 2012 Tour.
- Ryan "Feng" Feng choreographed "Champagne Showers" by LMFAO. He can also be seen in LMFAO's "Party Rock Anthem" and "Sorry for Party Rocking"
- Aris "FreakinAris" Paracuelles appeared on America's Best Dance Crew Season 6 Finale and Champions for Charity as a temporary performer for Feng and D-Trix. He was also part of LMFAO's "Party Rock Anthem" and "Champagne Showers", and he can be seen in "Sexy and I Know It", also seen in Sorry for Party Rocking.
- Rudy "Ru" Reynon, II is a professional extreme martial artist, martial arts tricker, music producer "Ru AREYOU", and dancer from Sacramento, CA. Seen in "Champagne Showers" and "Sorry for Party Rocking music videos by LMFAO.
- Victor Kim also performs with Fallen Kings alongside D-Trix. He was also in "Party Rock Anthem", "Champagne Showers", and "Sexy and I Know It" by LMFAO and endorsed the new McDonald's Frozen Strawberry Lemonade drink. He was also a member of YouTube group YTF, alongside D-trix, Kevin Wu (KevJumba), Ryan Higa (NigaHiga), Chester See, Andrew Garcia and JR Aquino.
- Andy "RocketMan" Luo performed with the rest of the crew as a guest performance for LMFAO's 2012 Tour.
- Lydia Paek also appeared on the third season of America's Best Dance Crew but due to limited space on teams competed with the Boxcuttuhz crew instead. She is working with YG Entertainment. She co-wrote and co-produced "Don't Cry" with Teddy for 2NE1 member Park Bom. Lydia was introduced through Shaun Evaristo, who choreographs for Big Bang and 2NE1.
- Joe "Joleethal" Lee appeared on the seventh season of America's Best Dance Crew as a member of Mix'd Elements. He became a part of Quest Crew after Victor's departure from the crew.

=== Members on America's Best Dance Crew Season 3 ===
- Dominic "D-Trix" Sandoval - Filipino-German-Irish-Spanish-Indonesian-Chinese-Portuguese-Native-American
- Hokuto Konishi – Japanese-British
- Steve Terada – Japanese-American
- Ryan "Ryanimay" Conferido – Filipino-American
- Victor "King" Kim – Korean-American
- Ryan "Feng" Feng – Chinese-American
- Brian "Hirano" Hirano – Portuguese-Korean-Japanese-Filipino-Chinese-American

=== Members on America's Best Dance Crew Season 8 ===
- Dominic "D-Trix" Sandoval - Filipino-Mexican-American
- Hokuto Konishi – Japanese-British
- Steve "Dope Turtle" Terada – Japanese-American
- Ryan "Ryanimay" Conferido – Filipino-American
- Rudy "Ru" Reynon, II – Filipino-American
- Ryan "Feng" Feng – Chinese-American
- Joe "Jolee" Lee – Chinese-American
- Brian "Hirano" Hirano – Portuguese-Korean-Japanese-Filipino-Chinese-American
- Aris "FreakinAris" Paracuelles – Filipino-American

=== Inactive members ===
- Victor "King" Kim – Korean-American
- Andy "Rocket-Man" Luo – Taiwanese-American
- Lydia "Lyddz" Paek – Korean-American
- Aichi "Spinboy" Ono – Japanese
- Nick "Nicky T" Teti – American. He is currently in the Lionsgate singing group VFactory.
- Adil Khan (Beyond) – Norwegian. He is listed as an inactive member. He won Dansefeber, the Norwegian version of SYTYCD, in 2006. He is now acting in Norway.

== Appearances ==
=== Television ===
- Quest Crew won the third and eighth season of America's Best Dance Crew.
- Steve did stunts in Deadwood and My Name Is Earl.
- Ryan, D-Trix, Hok, and Aris performed at the 61st Primetime Emmy Awards.
- Both D-Trix and Hok appeared on The Ellen DeGeneres Show in 2009. D-Trix returned as a performer in 2013.
- D-trix, Hok, Steve, and Ryan appeared on The Tonight Show with Jay Leno.
- Ryan was a backup dancer for Whitney Houston performance on Dancing with the Stars.
- D-Trix, Aris, Hok, Ryan, and Victor were featured as background dancers for Sean Kingston's Performance on the 2009 Teen Choice Awards.
- The entire ABDC crew 7 appeared in the teaser trailer for the fourth season of America's Best Dance Crew
- Steve served as a guest instructor for the Martial Arts challenge on the fourth season of America's Best Dance Crew
- The crew, minus Feng, Andy, and Lydia, performed on December 2, 2009, on So You Think You Can Dance Season 6 with Snoop Dogg
- The crew minus Lydia, Feng and Andy performed as back up dancers for Usher's introduction performance during the 2010 NBA All-Star Game
- The ABDC crew returned on April 15 on ABDC for a special Champions for Charity episode, with fellow winners JabbaWockeeZ (season 1), Super Cr3w (season 2), We Are Heroes (season 4), and Poreotix (season 5). Aris replaced Feng for the performance, due to Feng's ankle injury. They still received a standing ovation.
- D-Trix returned to So You Think You Can Dance in Season 7 as an all-star.
- The crew performed on the live season finale of So You Think You Can Dance Season 7 on August 12, 2010
- The crew appeared on the second episode of the Disney Channel show Shake It Up. D-Trix made a guest appearance in the next season.
- Quest Crew performed in the finale of America's Best Dance Crew (Season 6) on June 5, 2011.
- Steve plays as a stunt double for Ryan Potter and other actors on Nickelodeon's Supah Ninjas.
- Steve made an uncredited cameo appearance in the first episode as one of the Black Dragons with nunchukus in Disney XD's Kickin' It.
- Hok, Ryan, Feng, Brian, Victor, Aris, and Steve performed as backup dancers for LMFAO's performance of Party Rock Anthem on So You Think You Can Dance Season 8 on June 23, 2011.
- Hok, Ryan, Brian and Victor performed as backup dancers for LMFAO's performance of Party Rock Anthem on The X factor Australia Season 3 on September 28, 2011.
- Hok, Ryan, Feng, Brian, and Aris performed as backup dancers for LMFAO's performance of Party Rock Anthem and Sexy and I Know It on the American Music Awards 2011.
- D-Trix can be seen in the video game trailer for Just Dance 4.

=== Music videos ===
- Steve can be seen at the beginning of the music video "Pump It" by The Black Eyed Peas.
- Members of Quest appeared in the music video "Dance Like Michael Jackson" by Far East Movement.
- Members of Quest appeared in music videos for Baby Bash and Snoop Dogg.
- Victor was one of the dancers in Kevjumba, Wong Fu Productions, and David Choi's Music video for "Dance to this Song".
- Steve and Victor can be seen in the music video "Rocketeer" by Far East Movement.
- D-Trix appeared in the music video for "Ready to Go (Get Me Out of My Mind)" by Panic! at the Disco.
- Members of Quest appeared in the music video of "Somebody to Love" by Justin Bieber
- Hok choreographed the music video "Party Rock Anthem" by LMFAO Ryan And Feng Were Co-Choreographers. The music video had also been nominated for the 2011 MTV Video Music Award for Best Choreography. Hok, Ryan, Feng, Victor, Steve, Aris, and Hirano also make an appearance in the music video.
- Hok and Feng choreographed the music video "Champagne Showers" by LMFAO. Hok, Ryan, Feng, Victor, Steve, Aris, and Hirano also make an appearance in the music video.
- Hok is one of the main backup dancers in the "Sexy and I Know It" by LMFAO Music Video. Ryan, Feng, Aris, Victor, Steve also make an appearance in the music video.
- Hok is one of the main backup dancers in the "Sorry for Party Rocking" by LMFAO Music Video. Ryan, Feng, Aris, Victor, Steve, and Hirano also make an appearance in the music video.
- Hok, Ryan, Feng, Victor, Steve, and Hirano also appeared in the music video for "Live My Life" by the Far East Movement feat Justin Bieber(party rock remix).
- Lydia Paek was a backup dancer in "One of a Kind" by GDragon.
- Hok appeared in the music video "Fine China" by Chris Brown

=== Miscellaneous events ===
- Quest Crew performed at hip-hop dance charity showcase, Ken-Ya Dance, in 2011 and will be returning for another headliner appearance in April 2014.
- The ABDC crew performed on a 5 City Tour promoting Samsung/T-mobile's new Behold II Phone.
- D-trix, Ryan, and Victor performed for Nike Live for Kobe Bryant's shoe release.
- D-Trix, Steve, Hok, and Victor all performed at Urban Street Jam 2010.
- Quest Crew performed at the 2010 East Coast Asian American Student Union Conference at the University of Pennsylvania
- Quest Crew came to Orlando, Florida, for the dance convention Monsters of Hip-Hop
- Quest Crew performed at the Asian Heritage Month in Calgary, Alberta Canada on May 16, 2010
- Quest Crew performed at the International Secret Agents New York concert in Webster Hall on August 28, 2010
- Quest Crew also performed at The World of Dance with members Lydia and Aris. D-Trix did not perform with them
- Crew members Hok and Steve were featured on Inside Edition.

=== Movies ===
- Steve made a brief appearance as an uncredited martial artist in Beverly Hills Ninja.
- Steve is seen riding a bike in Memoirs of a Geisha.
- Crew members Hok, Ryan Feng and Victor Kim made an appearance in Boogie Town.
- The crew made a guest appearance in Alvin and the Chipmunks: The Squeakquel
- Hok, Feng, Ryan, Aris, Victor, Hirano and Steve have cameos in Honey 2.
- Steve performed stunts in Crank and Indiana Jones and the Kingdom of the Crystal Skull.
- Steve played as Will Forte's flip/stunt double for MacGruber.
- Steve Terada, Victor Kim and Dominic Sandoval were in the 2013 film Battle of the Year.
- D-Trix played a role as a nearby student in Smosh: The Movie.

=== YouTube ===
- Ryan, Hok, Feng, Victor & Lydia appeared in the Boogiezone communitycenter commercial 2009 (D-trix only made it into the outtakes)
- Victor, Steve, and D-Trix have been cameos for Nigahiga, a popular video maker on YouTube
- D-Trix, currently an active YouTuber, starred in a short web film Agents of Secret Stuff, made by Wong Fu Productions, starring Ryan Higa, Arden Cho, Smosh, and other YouTube celebrities.

== So You Think You Can Dance ==
Five out of the ten active members of Quest Crew have appeared on So You Think You Can Dance. Ryan and Hok auditioned for season one with another member of their former crew Sick Step; crew member Ryan 'Ryanimay' Conferido appeared on the first season as a finalist and Hok did not make it. Ryan was eliminated in the fourth week of season one. Steve Terada, Victor Kim, and Hokuto 'Hok' Konishi had all auditioned for the second season (this being Hok's second time). Steve and Victor were both eliminated in the choreography rounds. Hok nearly made it to the top 20, but was only in the United States on a student visa, and was ineligible to be employed which led to his dismissal from the program. After obtaining a work permit, Hok had returned for the third season along with Dominic 'D-Trix' Sandoval. This time, both made it to the top 20. Hok was eliminated during the fifth week of competition and D-Trix was eliminated in the seventh week. Both D-Trix and Hok went on tour with the rest of the top 10 dancers with D-Trix as a featured dancer and Hok serving as a substitute/swing dancer. In 2008, Victor auditioned again for the fourth season but was cut early on in the choreography rounds. In 2017, Mark Villaver auditioned and made it all the way to the top 10 for the fourteenth season alongside his all-star Comfort.

== Awards and nominations ==
Year presented, name of the award ceremony, category, nominee of the award, and the result of the nomination

Year	Award	Category	Nominee(s)	Result	Ref.
2015	World Choreography Award	Concert Dance Performance	World of Dance FrontRow LA '14 (Quest Crew)	Won	
2016	World Choreography Award	Live Stage Performance	Hit The Floor Lévis 2015 (Quest Crew)	Won	
2016	Primetime Creative Arts Emmy	Outstanding Choreography	"Runaway Baby", "Take U There", "Summer Thing" (Quest Crew)	Won	

== America's Best Dance Crew Season 3 ==
In 2009 Quest Crew became the winners of season three of America's Best Dance Crew. The seven members who competed were Hok, Feng, D-Trix, Brian, Victor, Steve, and Ryan. Lydia Paek, who is also a member of Quest Crew, decided to perform with the Boxcuttuhz due to the show's 7 member limit rule, meaning she could not dance with Quest. Aris Paracuelles and Andy Luo did not compete due to the seven member limit. Quest Crew originally auditioned for season one but were unable to take part of the show because crew members D-Trix and Hok's original contract with So You Think You Can Dance.

=== Performances ===
Week	Challenge	Music	Result
1: Sudden Death Challenge	Own Master Mix	Hero - Nas	Safe
2: Fit Test Challenge	Kickboxing	Let It Rock - Kevin Rudolf ft. Lil' Wayne	Safe
3: Britney Spears Challenge	Perform Part of the Routine Blindfolded	Toxic - Britney Spears	Safe
4: Whack Track Challenge	Crotch Grab Pendulum	You Got It (The Right Stuff) - New Kids on the Block	Safe
5: Illusion Challenge	Make an object pass through their body	Got Money - Lil' Wayne ft. T-Pain	Safe
6: Battle of The Sexes Challenge	Emulate a Male or Female artist's music video	Forever - Chris Brown	Safe
7: Hip-Hop Decathlon Challenge	Incorporate hip-hop's most difficult styles of dancing in their routine	Threading: Poker Face - Lady Gaga; Tutting: Love Lockdown - Kanye West; Waving: I'm in Miami Bitch (Trick) - LMFAO; Housing: Closer - Ne-Yo; Krumping: Get Up - 50 Cent	Bottom 2
7: Hip-Hop Decathlon Challenge	Last Chance to hook the voters using an original performance	"orQUESTra"	Safe
8: The Live Finale	Partners: Dynamic Edition; Strikers All-Stars	Right Round - Flo Rida	Champions
8: The Live Finale	Partner: Beat Freaks	Beggin' - Madcon	Champions
8: The Live Finale	Victory Dance after being announced season's 3 ABDC winners	On Top of The World - T.I.	Champions
Special: Champions for Charity	Partners: Super Cr3w; Jabbawockeez; We Are Heroes; Poreotix	"All I Do Is Win" - DJ Khaled with the past ABDC winners	Helped for Charity
Special: Champions for Charity	Partners: Super Cr3w; Jabbawockeez; We Are Heroes; Poreotix	"Sing Sing Sing - Swing Kids	Helped for Charity
America's Best Dance Crew Season 6 Finale	Guest Performance	Party Rock Anthem - LMFAO	Guest Performance

=== Week 1: Sudden Death Challenge ===
During the Sudden Death Challenge, Quest Crew performed to their own master mix featuring Hero by Nas. They received overwhelmingly positive comments from the judges and were saved from elimination. Kid Rainen, a member of the JabbaWockeeZ served as a guest judge in place of JC Chasez. He complimented D-Trix's double halos and shoulder halos b-boy moves. Lil' Mama complimented Ryan on performing a highflip and landing on his head (describing him as 'crazy'). Shane Sparks also praised them, and said, "The battle is on."

=== Week 2: Fit Test Challenge ===
During the Fit Test Challenge, Quest Crew was given the challenge of Kickboxing. This challenge was performed to a master mix of Kevin Rudolf ft. Lil Wayne's "Let It Rock." Steve is a martial arts instructor, and he took them through all the basic punches and kicks. The crew relied on him to deliver those heavy blow ups. JC said they had great moments but thought the performance seemed a little too "Tae Bo" and said they had too much posing. Lil Mama agreed. However, Shane Sparks thought there were many moments in their performance where they killed the show and praised them. Nevertheless, they were saved from elimination that night.

=== Week 3: Britney Spears Challenge ===
During the Britney Spears Challenge, the Britney Spears song that Quest Crew received was "Toxic". For this challenge, they had to perform a portion of their routine blindfolded. Their performance was given positive remarks from the judges with judge JC Chasez calling it his favorite performance of the night. Shane Sparks, stated that the crew "killed the stage" when they incorporated a little feminine vibe into their routine. Shane Sparks also complimented Ryan on his "Shablam," and calling him 'crazy' for doing that. Originally, Dominic was supposed to do the solo, performing fouettes into airflares, but injured his shoulder in rehearsal. At last minute, Ryan created the back flip "Shablam", but after the episode he injured his knee. After the airing of the episode, Dominic and Ryan both commented that the Britney Spears Challenge was cursed on account of both getting injured.

=== Week 4: Whack Track Challenge ===
During the Whack Track Challenge, Quest Crew got You Got It (The Right Stuff) by New Kids on the Block as their whack track. The crew chose to do the crotch grab pendulum and their routine featured Hok looking like he was on his hands but in reality he had switched his clothes around and eventually changed back into regular attire. The performance was again praised due to Quest's creativity and getting Hok in and out cleanly.

After this performance, there were controversies by some fans of the show throughout the internet. It was pointed out that the move done by Hok had been performed by Korean B-Boy crew, Project Seoul. Quest was accused of being "biters", however D-Trix soon issued an apology through a bboy forum.

=== Week 5: Illusion Challenge ===
During the Illusion Challenge, Quest Crew had to put an object through their body. The crew chose to perform to a master mix of Got Money by Lil Wayne feat. T-Pain. In their performance, Feng "stabbed" Brian Hirano with a coat rack and broke it off.

JC criticized their performance by pointing out that there was too much posing. JC also criticized Quest on their transitions. Some fans in the audience did not approve of JC's comments and responded with 'boos.' However, Lil Mama responded by instructing the fans in the audience not to boo because that would not enable Quest to listen to their "Words of Wisdom." Shane Sparks also stated to Quest that "Beat Freaks are on y'all butts", with Victor jokingly looking behind him and responding backstage saying "I'm honored that they're on our butts. I like them there, actually."

=== Week 6: Battle of the Sexes Challenge ===
During the Battle of the Sexes Challenge, it was between two male crews, and two female crews. Quest Crew had to dance to the song "Forever" by Chris Brown. The crew decided they would imitate the smooth moves and gliding from the video. The judges complimented their performance and Shane complimented D-Trix (Dominic Sandoval) on having the cleanest air flares on the show.

=== Week 7: Hip-Hop Decathlon and Last Chance Challenge ===
During the Hip-Hop Decathlon Challenge, Quest was put into the bottom two for the first time against Fly Khicks. The crew had to incorporate five styles of hip hop into their routine: threading, krumping, housing, tutting and waving. Hok was familiar with tutting and Ryan Conferido knew how to thread so the crew depended on them to work on those sections. Songs performed in the Hip Hop Decathlon were: Poker Face by Lady Gaga (Threading), Love Lockdown by Kanye West (Tutting), I'm in Miami trick by LMFAO (Waving), Closer by Ne-Yo (Housing), and Get Up by 50 Cent (Krumping). The performance received a standing ovation from the judges and audience. The judges highly praised the crew. D-Trix performed elbow airflares, which received compliments from Shane Sparks, Hirano receiving compliments for being buff - since he ripped his shirt off during the krumping section - and Steve Terada performed a backflip from a sitting Indian-style position. Victor Kim performed threaded handhops, and Hok Konishi choreographed the tutting section. JC praised Hok in his tutting by calling him a true Egyptian and stating that Hok should be called "King Tut".

The second challenge involved creating their own song, much like season 1 and season 2's last chance challenge. Quest's song was titled "orQUESTra". The song included Ryan Conferido's own piano piece. Ryan actually played the piano during the middle of the performance while D-Trix performed headspins to the alternating tempos on top of the piano. After a box split and locking solo by Hok, Victor Kim performed a hollowback into an invert. At the end of the performance, D-Trix pushed Steve Terada who was in the middle of a vertical back flip sideways over Hok and Victor, and ended with the Quest Crew Salute. This performance is number two on Randy Jackson's list of top 10 performances of all time.

=== ABDC Finale ===
For the finale Quest performed in a dance collaboration with Strikers All Stars and Dynamic Edition. This group which was chosen by Shane Sparks had to dance to the song "Right Round" by Flo Rida. Later that same night Quest performed a routine with fellow finalist Beat Freaks to a mastermix "Beggin'" by Madcon. After nearly 20 million votes were cast, Quest was declared the winners of America's Best Dance Crew season 3. Their victory dance was to "On Top of the World" by T.I. ft Ludacris.

=== Special: Champions for Charity ===
On April 15, 2010 America's Best Dance Crew held a special charity episode featuring the winners of the first five seasons. Each dance crew was partnered with a charity organization. Quest Crew supported the DoSomething.org volunteer organization which inspires young people into action to better their community. Quest spent time with Jordan Coleman, the fourteen-year-old from Hackensack, NJ, who developed and released the film “Say It Loud” to promote the importance of education. Hok held the honor of presenting Jordan with a donation check worth $10,000. They performed to "Sing, Sing, Sing" by Swing Kids.

=== ABDC Season 6 Finale ===
On June 5, 2011, Quest Crew performed on the sixth season finale of MTV's America's Best Dance Crew. The crew performed to "Party Rock Anthem" by LMFAO. This was the first performance where D-Trix did not dance with Quest Crew on ABDC, as D-Trix himself was on the judging panel. Naturally, D-Trix gave Quest his judging commentary, where he praised their routine as well as the bond they share as a dance crew that caused them to pull off their performance.

Preceded by Super Cr3w	America's Best Dance Crew Champions; Quest Crew	Succeeded by We Are Heroes
