= Kaba Modern =

Californian dance group since 1992

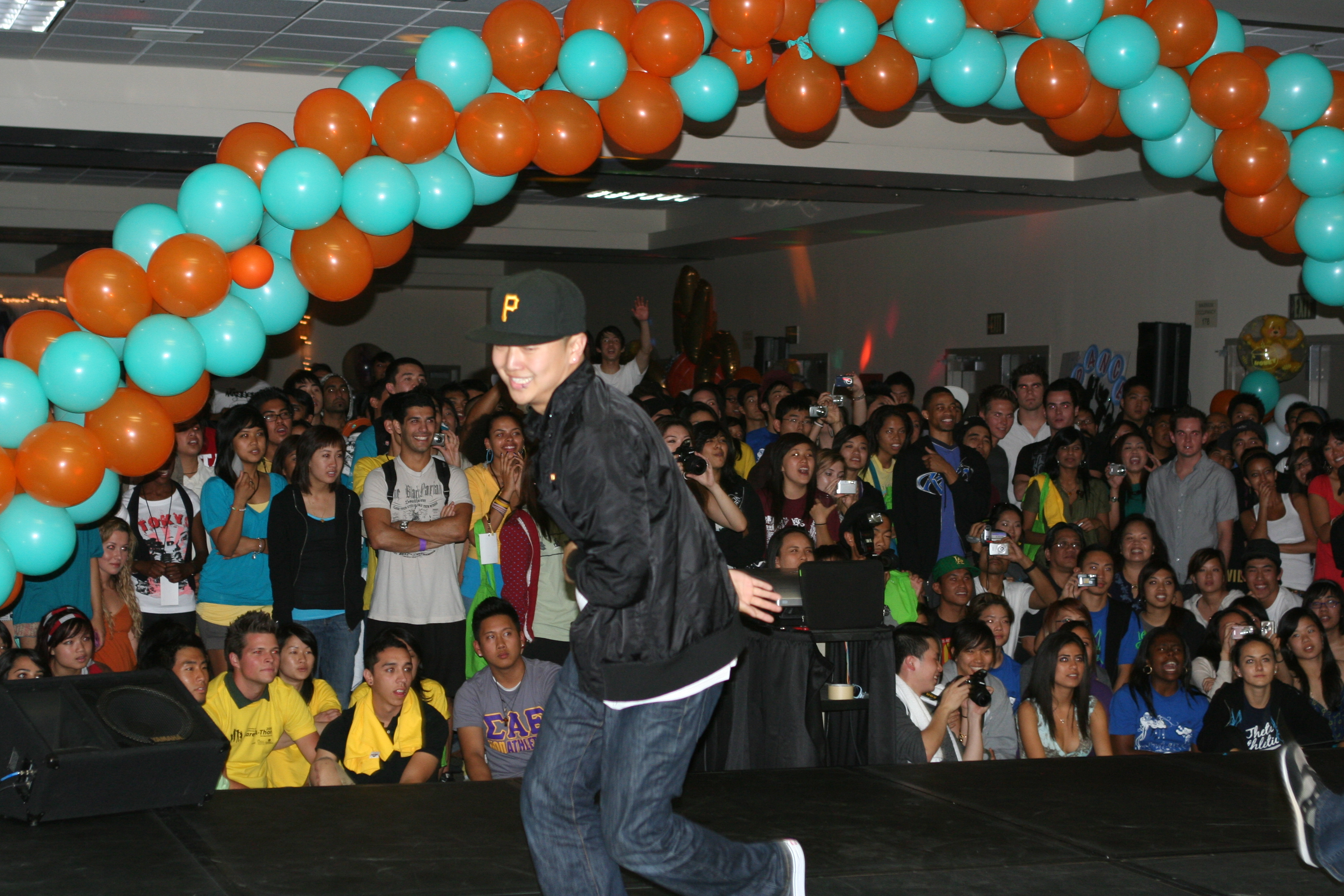

Background information
- Origin: Irvine, California, U.S.
- Genre: Hip-hop
- Years active: 1992–2008
- Past members: Yuri Tag; Lawrence Kao; Cindy Minowa; Jia Huang; Mike Song; Tony Tran

Kaba Modern is a dance group originating in Irvine, California. It is a spin-off of the University of California, Irvine (UCI) Filipino cultural club, Kababayan, which means "countrymen" in Tagalog. Created by Arnel Calvario in 1992, Kaba Modern began as dancers that performed the hip-hop portion or the "Modern Suite" of Kababayan's annual Pilipino Cultural Night (PCN) at UCI. Since then, Kaba Modern has entered multinational competitions and gained recognition in the media. For instance, a few Kaba Modern members helped choreograph the "dance battle" scene in The Debut in 1997 while three members were shown onscreen during the Making Of featurette of the DVD.

The Kaba Modern family is divided into three sub-teams: Kaba Kids (formerly known as Kreative Movement) is for members 18 and under, Kaba Modern is the UCI competitive team for college-level students, and Kaba Modern Legacy is an exhibition team for Kaba Modern alumni and special guests. The Kaba Modern Legacy Roster includes all 6 members that appeared on MTV's America's Best Dance Crew (Mike Song, Jia Huang, Cindy Minowa, Tony Tran, Yuri Tag, and Lawrence Kao) and several other Kaba Modern members who no longer dance for the UCI team.

== Kaba Modern events ==
Events held by the group include:

- Debut Performance: A performance dedicated to debuting the new team for the upcoming year, especially the incoming class.
- Ken-Ya Dance: An annual hip-hop dance charity showcase hosted by Kenya Dream at UCI whose proceeds help improve children's education in Kenya, Africa.
- UCI's PACN: A traditional performance done at UCI's annual PACN.
- Summer Choreo Days: A series of workshops hosted by the current team featuring choreography from each member of the team.
- Summer Jams: A series of battles consisting of 3v3 bboy/bgirl battles and 1v1 all-style battles.
- Welcome Week: A series of performances done at UCI to welcome the incoming freshman in conjunction with the other UCI affiliated teams.
- Dance-A-Thon: A competition held for dancers outside Kaba Modern to compete for a chance to perform with the team.

== Competition history ==
The group has competed and placed in regional, national and international dance competitions including:

- VIBE
- Fusion, a dance competition hosted by the Multi-Asian Student Association at University of California, San Diego
- Hip Hop International
- America's Best Dance Crew
- Urban Street Jam

== Notable performances ==
=== VIBE ===
Vibe, in its 16th year, hosted by Lambda Theta Delta Fraternity at University of California, Irvine, is one of the most respected dance competitions in the dance community. Groups such as Team Millennia, and PAC Modern, compete in this competition. At VIBE XIII in 2008, Team Millennia placed first while Kaba Modern placed second.

Featured in Vibe 17 was Kaba Modern's movie-themed set, which had previously won first place at the 2011 Prelude Norcal Competition. The first piece of the set began with Marko Cristal's spinoff of the popular indie film, 500 Days of Summer. Following this was a collaborative piece by Jon Aldanese, Alex Hung, and Amy Chang that used both locking and waacking to represent the humor found in Zoolander. Next, coordinators Darren Wong and Dana Roy combined contemporary and breaking choreography as they took on the roles of Jack and Rose from Titanic. After a quick transition, Alex Cristal and other members danced a Buck number. Styles changed once again when Deyo Forteza's Scream piece showcased the dancer's isolation abilities. Closing off the set was a collaborative effort of many of the team's featured choreographers to create the "credits of the film."

=== Body Rock ===
Body Rock brings together some of the most notable teams throughout the world. The set for this competition did not feature any specific theme, but focused on "just dancing." The Kaba Modern set featured a variety of styles (isolations, locking, femme, ghetto, and contemporary hip hop).

=== FUSION Hip Hop Dance Competition ===
FUSION is arranged by the members of the Multi-Asian Student Association (MASA) at University of California, San Diego. FUSION believes that dance is an uplifting and life-changing form of expression that ought to be shared. This created the vision of FUSION to provide new dancers with the opportunity to be inspired by, grow, and join the growing dance community; to welcome dancers as a family and give them a place to perform; and to provide the audience with a memorable show. FUSION also seeks to educate its viewers, the day of and after, about Asian-American presence in the hip hop community.

Kaba Modern placed 3rd in the latest competition, FUSION XVI held on April 17, 2016.

=== Hip Hop International ===
Hip Hop International is a worldwide dance competition in which teams from all over the world compete. Teams must first place in their home country's preliminary and finals before making it to the world preliminaries and ultimately the world final. Kaba Modern became frequent finalist from years 2005 to 2009. In the World Hip Hop Dance Championships 2007 and 2008, they made it to the world finals after beating out their competition in the USA finals. They placed second to Trinidad and Tobago's Eclectik in 2007 and third in 2008 to the Philippine All Stars and Eclectik due to a deduction of points from not having attire intact.

=== America's Best Dance Crew ===
A 6-person segment of their team auditioned for, and succeeded in, the right to compete as one of 12 dance crews in the first season of Randy Jackson's interactive reality show, America's Best Dance Crew broadcast on MTV in early 2008. Although the group made it to the top 3, they were eliminated in week 7; the two remaining crews, JabbaWockeeZ and Status Quo, advanced to the finale.

==== Live Auditions Special ====
- Aired on January 26, 2008.

The crew danced to a District 78 Master Mix of Fieldy's Dreams' "Baby Hugh Hef" combined with an MTV production, "Knock 'em Dead". A powerful comment came from Shane Sparks stating that "It was like y'all took elements from every group, made y'all own crew, and did it better than everyone else!". JC appreciated the precision they showed and that "you don't have to do a back flip to show how athletic you are". Lil' Mama commented on their isolations, which set themselves apart from the other groups.

==== Week 1 ====
- Aired on February 7, 2008.

To kick the show off, each crew performed to songs of their own choosing. Kaba Modern chose to perform to the beat of "Grown Apart" by Lisa Shaw with lyrics by MTV and "Technologic" by Daft Punk. They were one of the crews to be saved by the judges, who again took note of their isolations. JC also commented on how well the girls did the b-boy section of their routine. Shane gave a special mention of Mike Song, saying "You are crazy! Crazy!"

==== Week 2 ====
- Aired on February 14, 2008.

Each crew was given a music video with a different dance component to emulate while keeping their own style as a crew. Kaba Modern were given the music video for "Wall to Wall" by Chris Brown. The judges gave the group high marks .

==== Week 3 ====
- Aired on February 21, 2008.

Each crew performed to a popular dance, also known as a "dance craze", and were required to add their own style to it as a crew. Since the dances were very simple, there were certain challenges each team had to meet while performing.

Kaba Modern were assigned Lil Mama's own G-Slide from her hit single "G-Slide (Tour Bus)". The challenge was to include a lift into the routine. To meet the challenge, each guy teamed up with a girl and flipped her backwards. Though the judges felt the lift challenge was met, they expressed that the team's execution was lacking, with Shane, in particular, expecting to see more lifts than one.

==== Week 4 ====
- Aired on February 28, 2008.

Each crew had to create a story through dance in the movie challenge. Every crew had to dance on the same set, which was set up as a street in an urban neighborhood. They were assigned characters and asked to create a story for those characters.

Kaba Modern's guys were made to be nerds, while the girls were to portray popular girls. The crew danced to Snoop Dogg's Sensual Seduction and 'I Would' by A. Witherspoon produced by District 78. The crew acted as if the nerds had created these beautiful, virtual girls, dancing with them until the point where they're about to kiss, until the programs ends before they get the chance.

J.C concluded that the girls' hip thrust was hot and mentioned how impressive the crew's attention to detail was, singling out an intricate hand isolation by Tony Tran. Lil Mama also said they got into character. Shane Sparks commented last week how the girls smashed the guys, and mentioned this week how the guys smashed the girls from Kaba Modern this week.

==== Week 5 ====
- Aired on March 6, 2008.

In honor of the 25th Anniversary of Michael Jackson's "Thriller" album, each crew was assigned a Michael Jackson song from the album "Thriller" and was given a DVD compilation of some of the Michael Jackson's dancing. They then had to perform to the song and demonstrate how much they knew about Michael Jackson's moves in their performance. Kaba Modern randomly selected Michael Jackson's Thriller.

The crew changed the theme from undead zombies to a futuristic setting. They incorporated much on their hands, and included Tutting into the routine, which judge Shane Sparks "waited to see." Sparks stated they are the future of dance. Judge Lil Mama stated that she liked how they did not copy the video exactly like most crews were doing. She appreciated the fact that they "made it their [Kaba Modern's] own." Lil Mama stated it was a video a "3-year old would want to watch for the first time." Judge JC Chasez praised their footwork and intricate movement. He liked it "Kaba's Way."

==== Week 6 ====
- Aired on March 13, 2008.

Kaba Modern was voted in the bottom 2 in week 6. They went into the elimination round against Break Sk8. Ultimately, Kaba Modern was saved by the judges. Each crew was given a song and dance from a Broadway musical and were required to make it hip-hop while retaining the essence of Broadway. Broadway-style dancers performed for the crews and taught them the dances. Each group also had to reinterpret the classic Broadway moves into the hip-hop routine. Kaba Modern were given a remix of "You're the One That I Want" from the musical Grease. The Broadway move challenge was the Knee Slide.

Yuri Tag was singled out for making a mistake during the performance. Mike Song stated that at 10 pm, the night before the show, the song was changed, forcing the crew to change parts of their choreography.

==== Week 7 ====
- Aired on March 20, 2008.

This week Status Quo received the most votes over JabbaWockeeZ and Kaba Modern. The last challenge was for the crews to illustrate the evolution of hip-hop using the same music. The final three crews had to perform to these songs using classic hip-hop moves such as Popping, Locking and Breakdancing. The crews were also to dance to Pop and new jack swing.

Song	Artist
Funkytown	Lipps Inc
It's Like That	Run DMC
Push It	Salt-n-Pepa
Bye Bye Bye	*NSYNC
Get Buck in Here	DJ Felli Fel

The saved crew was JabaWockeeZ. JC Chasez said that seeing JabaWockeeZ and Kaba Modern go against each other was the biggest and greatest competition on the show yet, maybe even surpassing what Status Quo and JabbaWockeeZ might do in the finals. In the end, Kaba Modern was sent home.

Before the crew left the studio at the end of the show, the crowd cheered for the crew, wanting them to dance again. Kaba Modern was also able to create a track and dance routine, like JabbaWockeeZ and Status Quo's Encore Do or Die round. The crew dressed in a new attire, and performed to the track but the routine, "America's Best Dance Crew: The Video Game", was never taped. Only the live audience was able to see the performance.

==== Week 8 Season Finale ====
- The live season finale aired live on March 27, 2008.

All crews returned to perform, each representing their region of the United States. Kaba Modern joined Fysh N Chicks and JabbaWockeeZ to represent the West Coast and performed to E-40's Tell Me When to Go. JabbaWockeeZ was crowned America's Best Dance Crew.

=== Encore ===
Following the episode of Kaba Modern's elimination, Shane Sparks had an interview at KTLA on the CW. With him was Kaba Modern, who performed a routine (this routine would have been the encore if they were not eliminated). It contained parts of their Gunshots routine as well as their G-Slide and Sensual Seduction routines. A different version of the encore was performed at the 2008 Asian Excellence Awards with clips of their Gunshots, Technologic and Thriller (song) routines. A third extended version, which they performed at the Northwestern University KASA show, included the full Gunshots routine, a slightly extended clip of the G-Slide routine, the Technologic routine and the Thriller routine. The fourth and most recent version performed was at the NYC Mansion party on May 25 where Kaba Modern performed the full, yet somewhat modified, version of the Gunshot routine, including the shows Knock 'em Dead routine, the G-Slide, the full routine of Technologic, the Funkytown part of the Hip Hop Evolution routine, a longer version of Thriller, and a longer version of Sensual Seduction. To this day, Kaba Modern has not used Wall to Wall and You're the one that I want routines in their Encore and has used the 4th version of the routine in their appearances since the NYC Mansion Party.

- Note: Kaba Modern's routine has been the only one with multiple versions as the first part of the song is easily editable.

=== 2008 MTV Video Music Awards ===
The 6 MTV Kaba Modern members made their triumphant return to the America's Best Dance Crew stage alongside Season 1 winners JabbaWockeeZ for an MTV VMA special which saw them compete against fellow Season 1 crews BreakSk8 and Status Quo, as well as SoReal Cru and Fanny Pak from Season 2 for a chance to perform and present at the 2008 MTV VMAs. This special challenge was to create a routine to a VMA nominated song and also have elements of the video with it, much like Season 1's Video Star Challenge. Kaba Modern performed to Madonna ft. Justin Timberlake's 4 Minutes and received high praise from Lil' Mama, who stated that Kaba Modern "tore up the stage." Kaba Modern, as well as Fanny Pak (Fanny Pack), made it to the top two and performed on the VMA Pre-Show to present the award for "Best Dancing in a Video." They danced to Ne-Yo's Closer. All six members dressed up as Ne-Yo did in the video and received praise from various members of the audience, including Lupe Fiasco. They lost to Fanny Pak.

=== ABDC Season 3 ===
Mike Song of the six members to compete on ABDC came back for Week 7 of America's Best Dance Crew (season 3) to demonstrate tutting. During a web exclusive he also said that he is roommates with a member of Quest Crew and that he was rooting for them. In a later interview with Quest it was revealed that Mike's roommate was Victor Kim.

=== Kaba Modern 6 Present Day ===
The 6 members, those who performed in ABDC are still in contact, however they are no longer considered a full group. As of 2013, their current status:

- Mike Song: Currently focuses on dance as one of the founding members of Kinjaz (ABDC season 8: Road to the VMAs), however is not part of Kaba Modern.
- Yuri Tag: Currently works in design with dance as a leisure time activity.
- Tony Tran: Currently a part of the Jabbawockeez. He is also one of the members of the Kinjaz with fellow Kaba Modern alum Mike Song and is no longer a part of Kaba Modern. However still claims to support the team.
- Jia Huang: Currently Focuses on dance, however main priority is not Kaba Modern.
- Lawrence Kao: Currently Focuses on Film (comedy). Also an occasional member of Kinjaz.
- Cindy Minowa: Currently focuses on dance for Kaba Modern and Clear Talent Group
