= We Are Heroes =

American popping dance group

- Origin: Los Angeles, California, United States
- Genres: Hip-hop; Popping; Waacking
- Years active: 2009–2015
- Labels: MTV, America's Best Dance Crew
- Past members: Hiroka "Hiro" McRae; Mami Kanemitsu; Riquel "Riqdiculous" Olander; Nichelle Thrower; Alison "Ali" Iannucci

We Are Heroes is an all female popping dance crew best known for being the first all-female crew to win America's Best Dance Crew with their title in Season 4. The winning prize amount was $100,000 in cash as well as ABDC's Golden B-Boy Trophy. Their styles of dance is popping, locking, tutting, and waacking, and also Nichelle and Ali are trained in gymnastics and can do flips.

The dance crew represents diversity, as the five members come from two entirely different sides of the globe. Hiroka "Hiro" and Mami are from Japan, Ali is from New York, Riquel is from Idaho, and Nichelle is from California.

== America's Best Dance Crew ==
=== Style ===
The girls came on the show as popping dancers and choreography that they coined "glam style". Lil Mama often referred to their style as a "Refreshing Harajuku" style.

=== Injuries ===
- Starting Week 3, during the Martial Arts Challenge, crew member Mami Kanemitsu suffered a torn ligament in her back. She was still able to perform for the rest of the season.
- During rehearsals for Week 5's Dance Craze Challenge, crew member Nichelle Thrower fell while attempting a flip on the built-in trampoline on the ABDC stage. She was rushed to the emergency room, receiving six stitches. Her doctor instructed her not to perform while the injury recovered, but she performed nonetheless.

=== Performances ===
Week	Challenge	Music	Result
1: Crew's Choice Challenge	Show America what We are Heroes is made of in a one-minute routine.	Waters of Nazareth - Justice	Safe
2: Beyoncé Challenge	"The grind" section from the video	Single Ladies (Put a Ring on It) - Beyoncé	Safe
3: Martial Arts Challenge	Karate	Starstrukk - 3OH!3	Safe
4: Bollywood Challenge	Giddha	Arab Money - Busta Rhymes & Ron Browz	Bottom 2
5: Dance Craze Challenge	The Stanky Legg	Stanky Legg - GS Boyz	Bottom 2
6: VMA Challenge	Incorporate hand-fans and the vogue in the routine	Vogue - Madonna	Safe
7: Decades of Dance and Last Chance Challenge	Must incorporate some of the moves from past decades music videos to their 2-minute routine.	1960s: Get Up (I Feel Like Being a) Sex Machine - James Brown; 1970s: Uprock - Rock Steady Crew; 1980s: Cold Hearted - Paula Abdul; 1990s: You Make Me Wanna - Usher; 2000s: LoveGame - Lady Gaga	Bottom 2
7: Decades of Dance and Last Chance Challenge	Create a routine that will convince viewers to vote for them and make them ABDC.	"Ichiban"	Safe
8: The Live Finale	Partners: Artistry in Motion; Vogue Evolution	Girls on the Dance Floor - Far East Movement	Champions
8: The Live Finale	Partner: Afroboriké	I Gotta Feeling - The Black Eyed Peas	Champions
8: The Live Finale	Champion's performance	I'm the Ish - DJ Class ft. Lil Jon	Champions
Season Five Special: Champions for Charity	Partners: Super Cr3w; Quest Crew; Jabbawockeez; Poreotix	All I Do Is Win by DJ Khaled	Helped for Charity
Season Five Special: Champions for Charity	Partners: Super Cr3w; Quest Crew; Jabbawockeez; Poreotix	Rock That Body by The Black Eyed Peas	Helped for Charity
Season Six Week 10: The Finale	Show what new moves and choreography have learned after the show	Girls (Who Run The World) by Beyoncé	Guest Performers
Season Seven Week 10: Katy Perry Challenge	Partners: 8 Flavahz	Last Friday Night (T.G.I.F.) by Katy Perry Ft. Missy Elliott	Guest Dance Partners

=== Community work ===
We are Heroes and fellow finalists Afroboriké took a trip with Shane Sparks to Culture Shock LA. Culture Shock LA is a non-profit hip-hop dance troupe that works to educate dancers, students, and audiences about the rich history of hip-hop, as well as its cultural relevance and relation to other art forms. Founded in 1993, Culture Shock has grown from its home in San Diego to cities that reach all across the US and Canada. While there, the crews taught young students new dance moves. We Are Heroes taught popping while Afroborike taught salsa and how to perform lifts.

== Career ==
=== Television ===
- All 5 members of We Are Heroes performed their "VMA challenge" performance on The Ellen DeGeneres Show on September 29, 2009.
- The ladies were guest performers at The Oprah Winfrey Show, The episode aired on Thursday, October 29, 2009.
- While crew-member Mami Kanemitsu was in Japan, the rest of We Are Heroes (Hiroka McRae, Ali Ianucci, Riquel Olander, and Nichelle Thrower) made their second appearance on The Ellen DeGeneres Show. The episode aired on November 5, 2009.
- On November 9, 2009, while crew-member Hiroka "Hiro" McRae was in Japan, the rest of the crew performed for Rihanna a medley of her songs on It's On with Alexa Chung.
- Member Nichelle Thrower reappeared for ABDC season five as the guest judge for the West Coast auditions.
- Member Riquel Olander reappeared on ABDC season five to demonstrate the New Orleans Bounce.
- All 5 members returned to ABDC on Thursday, April 15, 2010, for a "Champions For Charity" special. They had an individual performance to "Rock That Body" by The Black Eyed Peas, and a group performance to DJ Khaled's "All I Do Is Win" with the champions of Season 1: JabbaWockeeZ, Season 2: Super Cr3w, Season 3: Quest Crew, and Season 5: Poreotix.
- Members appeared at Delicious Training on Universal CityWalk in LA on May 22, 2010.
- Members performed at July 10, 2010 Kababayan fest at Knotts also with Poreotix.
- All 5 members appeared on the commercial for the Michael Jackson: The Experience video game.
- All 5 members appeared for the ABDC Season 6 Finale with the other 4 champions. They performed to "Run the World (Girls)" by Beyoncé.
- Member Hiroka McRae auditioned for season 8 of So You Think You Can Dance. During the audition, she mentioned her family is safe from the earthquake in Japan. She made it through the audition, but didn't make it to the Top 20.
- Member Nichelle Thrower appeared on a Reebok commercial featuring Swizz Beatz on Reebok Classic Presents: Reethym of Lite.

=== Music Videos ===
- The ladies, minus a temporarily replaced Hiroka McRae, appeared briefly in R&B singer Omarion's music video for his single "I Get It In".
- All 5 members made a cameo appearance in a music video called Not The Only One by Skyline .
- All 5 members made an appearance in the music video of "Eenie Meenie" by Justin Bieber and Sean Kingston.

- Founding member Hiroka McRae appeared on the music video of Teach Me How To Dougie by Cali Swag District.

- Member Mami Kanemitsu and original We Are Heroes member Marie Poppins appeared on the music video of C'mon (Catch 'Em By Surprise) by Tiësto vs. Diplo ft. Busta Rhymes.

=== Other appearances ===
- All 5 members appeared in Paris by Night Divas, a Vietnamese variety show, as guest dancers in the final song.
- All 5 members are current performers at elecTRONica @ DISNEYLAND, CA. They have two shows every Friday, Saturday, and Sunday for three weeks.

=== Charity ===
- The crew created a charity "Pray...Hope... for Japan" to help people who are suffering in Japan after the incident.

Preceded by Quest Crew	America's Best Dance Crew Champions; We Are Heroes	Succeeded by Poreotix
