= Get Up (50 Cent song) =

Single by 50 Cent
- Released: October 7, 2008
- Recorded: 2008
- Genre: Hip-hop
- Length: 3:15
- Label: Aftermath; Shady; Interscope; Universal
- Songwriters: Curtis Jackson; Scott Storch
- Producer: Scott Storch

50 Cent singles chronology
"I'll Still Kill" (2007)	"Get Up" (2008)	"I Get It In" (2009)

"Get Up" is a single by rapper 50 Cent, produced by Scott Storch. It was initially released as the official first single from his fourth studio album Before I Self Destruct, but it was later replaced by "Baby by Me", thus becoming an outtake from that album, and was only released in digital download on October 7, 2008, via Shady Records, Aftermath and Interscope.

== Background ==
The single was first released to 50 Cent's official MySpace page as well as his personal internet community, ThisIs50.com, with it later being released onto his YouTube account 50CentMusic, though the video has now been taken down from the account and re uploaded to 50 Cent's VEVO channel 50CentVEVO. The song was released to iTunes on October 13, 2008. On October 30, 2008, Universal Music Group released the explicit version onto their YouTube account. New York Yankees shortstop Derek Jeter used the song as his plate music for much of the 2009 season. America's Best Dance Crew season 3 winners Quest Crew also used the song in their week seven performance as krumping music. The song peaked at #44 on the Billboard Hot 100.

== Music video ==
The music video, inspired by the Will Smith film I Am Legend, was released on November 6, 2008. The start of the video is similar to the video for "In Da Club" with a view of the Shady Aftermath Artist Development Center. Dr. Dre and Eminem appear frozen at the end of the video. Lloyd Banks, Tony Yayo, Spider Loc and 40 Glocc were featured behind the scenes.

The song and video has been viewed over 60 million times on YouTube.

== Track listing ==
Digital single

No.	Title	Writer(s)	Producer(s)	Length
1.	"Get Up" (album version)	C. Jackson, S. Storch	Scott Storch	3:15

== Charts ==
Chart (2008–2009)	Peak position
Australia (ARIA)	73
Canada Hot 100 (Billboard)	31
Ireland (IRMA)	33
UK Hip Hop/R&B (Official Charts)	6
UK Singles (Official Charts)	24
US Billboard Hot 100	44
US Hot R&B/Hip-Hop Songs (Billboard)	23
US Hot Rap Songs (Billboard)	9
US Pop 100 (Billboard)	51
US Rhythmic Airplay (Billboard)	21

== Certifications ==
Region	Certification	Certified units/sales
United States (RIAA)	Gold	500,000^{‡}
^{‡} Sales+streaming figures based on certification alone.

== Release history ==
Region	Date	Format(s)	Label(s)	Ref.
United States	October 28, 2008	Rhythmic contemporary radio	Shady, Aftermath, Interscope	
