= America's Best Dance Crew season 3 =

America's Best Dance Crew
- Season 3
- Hosted by: Mario Lopez
- Judges: JC Chasez; Lil Mama; Shane Sparks
- Winner: Quest Crew

Release
- Original network: MTV
- Original release: January 15 – March 5, 2009

Season chronology
- ← Previous; Season 2 Next → Season 4

The third season of America's Best Dance Crew premiered on January 15, 2009. The season was once again hosted by Mario Lopez and featured Layla Kayleigh as the backstage correspondent. Lil Mama, JC Chasez, and Shane Sparks returned as the judging panel. This was the first season without a special casting episode. In the live finale, which aired on March 5, 2009, Quest Crew was declared the winner.

== Cast ==
Similar to the first season, nine dance crews were selected to compete on America's Best Dance Crew, as opposed to ten. While the crews were not officially divided into the usual four regions (East Coast, West Coast, Midwest, and South) as with the previous two seasons, the regions were still listed on each crew's banner. This was also the first season to showcase a crew from the Caribbean. Team Millennia, who was eliminated during the Season 2 casting special, returned as one of the nine official dance crews.

| Dance Crew | Hometown | Region |
|---|---|---|
| Beat Freaks | Los Angeles, California | West |
| Boxcuttuhz | San Diego, California | West |
| Dynamic Edition | Winfield, Alabama | South |
| Fly Khicks | Miami, Florida | South |
| G.O.P. Dance | San Juan, Puerto Rico | Caribbean |
| Quest Crew | Los Angeles, California | West |
| Ringmasters | Brooklyn, New York | East |
| Strikers All-Stars | Tallahassee, Florida | South |
| Team Millennia | Fullerton, California | West |

== Results ==
| Rank | Dance Crew | Episode | | | | | | | |
| Rank | Dance Crew | 1 | 2 | 3 | 4 | 5 | 6 | 7 | 8 |
|---|---|---|---|---|---|---|---|---|---|
| 1 | Quest Crew | IN | IN | IN | IN | IN | IN | RISK | WINNER |
| 2 | Beat Freaks | IN | IN | IN | IN | IN | IN | IN | RUNNER-UP |
| 3 | Fly Khicks | RISK | IN | IN | RISK | RISK | RISK | OUT | |
| 4 | Strikers All-Stars | IN | IN | IN | IN | IN | OUT | | |
| 5 | Dynamic Edition | IN | IN | IN | IN | OUT | | | |
| 6 | Ringmasters | IN | IN | RISK | OUT | | | | |
| 7 | Team Millennia | IN | RISK | OUT | | | | | |
| 8 | Boxcuttuhz | RISK | OUT | | | | | | |
| 9 | G.O.P. Dance | OUT | | | | | | | |

Key
(WINNER) The dance crew won the competition and was crowned "America's Best Dance Crew".
(RUNNER-UP) The dance crew was the runner-up in the competition.
(IN) The dance crew was safe from elimination.
(RISK) The dance crew was at risk for elimination.
(OUT) The dance crew was eliminated from the competition.

== Episodes ==
=== Episode 1: Sudden Death Challenge ===
- Original Airdate: January 15, 2009

The crews performed to the songs of their choosing. Then, the judges chose the bottom three crews to compete in a sudden death dance battle to "Live Your Life" by T.I. Rynan "Kid Rainen" Paguio from JabbaWockeeZ temporarily guest judged in place of JC Chasez, who later returned the following episode.

| Dance Crew | Song |
|---|---|
| Strikers All-Stars | "Swing Ya Rag" by T.I. feat. Swizz Beatz |
| Beat Freaks | "Din Daa Daa" by George Kranz |
| G.O.P. Dance | "Rompe" by Daddy Yankee |
| Quest Crew | "Hero" by Nas feat. Keri Hilson |
| Fly Khicks | "Milkshake" by Kelis |
| Ringmasters | "Welcome Back" by Young Jeezy |
| Boxcuttuhz | "Bonafied Lovin'" by Chromeo |
| Dynamic Edition | "My Humps" by The Black Eyed Peas |
| Team Millennia | "Beating Heart Baby" by Head Automatica |

- Safe: Strikers All-Stars, Beat Freaks, Quest Crew, Ringmasters, Dynamic Edition, Team Millennia
- Bottom 3: G.O.P. Dance, Fly Khicks, Boxcuttuhz
- Eliminated: G.O.P. Dance

=== Episode 2: Fit Test Challenge ===
- Original Airdate: January 22, 2009

Each crew was given a physical activity/exercise to incorporate into their routine.

| Dance Crew | Song | Challenge |
|---|---|---|
| Quest Crew | "Let It Rock" by Kevin Rudolf feat. Lil Wayne | Kickboxing |
| Fly Khicks | "Krazy" by Pitbull feat. Lil Jon | Spring back |
| Strikers All-Stars | "Move (If You Wanna) by Mims | Monkey roll |
| Beat Freaks | "Independent" by Webbie feat. Lil Boosie | Side plank |
| Dynamic Edition | "Shake That" by Eminem feat. Nate Dogg | High knees |
| Ringmasters | "Put On" by Young Jeezy feat. Kanye West | Soldier crawl |
| Team Millennia | "Disturbia" by Rihanna | Leap frog |
| Boxcuttuhz | "Everyone Nose" by N.E.R.D. | Mountain climber |

- Safe: Quest Crew, Fly Khicks, Strikers All-Stars, Beat Freaks, Dynamic Edition, Ringmasters
- Bottom 2: Team Millennia, Boxcuttuhz
- Eliminated: Boxcuttuhz

=== Episode 3: Britney Challenge ===
- Original Airdate: January 29, 2009

The crews took inspiration from Britney Spears' music videos to create their routines. Andre Fuentes, Spears' choreographer, assigned additional challenges for the crews to complete.

| Dance Crew | Song | Challenge |
|---|---|---|
| Beat Freaks | "Womanizer" | Perform the tough and seductive sides of Britney from the video. |
| Strikers All-Stars | "Gimme More" | Perform while creating mirror images of themselves. |
| Dynamic Edition | "Stronger" | Perform while incorporating chair choreography. |
| Quest Crew | "Toxic" | Perform a portion of their routine blindfolded. |
| Fly Khicks | "...Baby One More Time" | Perform with sharp pirouettes in their routine. |
| Team Millennia | "Me Against the Music" feat. Madonna | Perform with a hat and cane as props. |
| Ringmasters | "Circus" | Perform while creating the illusion of a giant person. |

- Safe: Beat Freaks, Strikers All-Stars, Dynamic Edition, Quest Crew, Fly Khicks
- Bottom 2: Team Millennia, Ringmasters
- Eliminated: Team Millennia

=== Episode 4: Whack Track Challenge ===
- Original Airdate: February 5, 2009

The crews performed to cliché songs that spurred uncool and silly dance crazes. Each crew had to incorporate their respective song's dance into their routines, while also trying to make the moves look fresh.

| Dance Crew | Song |
|---|---|
| Quest Crew | "You Got It (The Right Stuff)" by New Kids on the Block |
| Strikers All-Stars | "2 Legit 2 Quit" by MC Hammer |
| Beat Freaks | "Pretty Fly (For a White Guy)" by The Offspring |
| Dynamic Edition | "Achy Breaky Heart" by Billy Ray Cyrus |
| Ringmasters | "Macarena" by Los Del Rio |
| Fly Khicks | "Gonna Make You Sweat (Everybody Dance Now)" by C+C Music Factory |

- Safe: Quest Crew, Strikers All-Stars, Beat Freaks, Dynamic Edition
- Bottom 2: Ringmasters, Fly Khicks
- Eliminated: Ringmasters

=== Episode 5: Illusion Challenge ===
- Original Airdate: February 12, 2009

The crews had to perform their routines utilizing various magic tricks and illusions.

| Dance Crew | Song | Challenge |
|---|---|---|
| Beat Freaks | "Freeze" by T-Pain feat. Chris Brown | Perform while making something levitate. |
| Quest Crew | "Got Money" by Lil Wayne feat. T-Pain | Perform while passing an object through their bodies. |
| Strikers All-Stars | "Swing" by Savage | Perform while walking through a solid object. |
| Dynamic Edition | "Starstruck" by Lady Gaga feat. Flo Rida | Perform while trying to appear out of thin air. |
| Fly Khicks | "Diva" by Beyoncé | Perform while stretching like rubber. |

- Safe: Beat Freaks, Quest Crew, Strikers All-Stars
- Bottom 2: Dynamic Edition, Fly Khicks
- Eliminated: Dynamic Edition

=== Episode 6: Battle of the Sexes Challenge ===
- Original Airdate: February 19, 2009

The episode started off with a group performance, choreographed by Napoleon and Tabitha D'umo, featuring Ludacris' "What Them Girls Like" and Beyoncé's "Single Ladies".

The two remaining male crews then battled against the two remaining female crews. Each crew had to emulate a male or female superstar's music video, and were challenged to incorporate the spirit of the video into their choreography.

| Dance Crew | Song |
|---|---|
| Quest Crew | "Forever" by Chris Brown |
| Beat Freaks | "Hot n Cold" by Katy Perry |
| Strikers All-Stars | "Pose" by Daddy Yankee |
| Fly Khicks | "Pon De Replay" by Rihanna |

- Safe: Quest Crew, Beat Freaks
- Bottom 2: Strikers All-Stars, Fly Khicks
- Eliminated: Strikers All-Stars

=== Episode 7: Hip-Hop Decathlon Challenge ===
- Original Airdate: February 26, 2009

The crews competed against each other in two challenges: the Hip-Hop Decathlon and the Last Chance Challenge. After the mid-show elimination, the top two crews performed their routines for the Last Chance Challenge.

==== Challenge #1: Hip-Hop Decathlon Challenge ====
The three remaining crews had to demonstrate their versatility by creating a routine that incorporated five different hip hop dance styles. The competitors were given the same five styles and songs, and received help from five guest ABDC alumni from the previous two seasons. Each alumnus/alumna was assigned to one of the dance styles the crews were responsible for.

| Song | Style | Guest |
|---|---|---|
| "Poker Face" by Lady Gaga | Threading | Ronnie "Ronnie Boy" Abaldonado of Super CR3W |
| "I'm in Miami, Trick" by LMFAO" | Waving | Kevin "KB" Brewer of JabbaWockeeZ |
| "Love Lockdown" by Kanye West | Tutting | Mike Song of Kaba Modern |
| "Closer" by Ne-Yo | Housing | Taeko Carroll of Fysh n Chicks |
| "Get Up" by 50 Cent | Krumping | Antoine "Frost" Troupe of Supreme Soul |

- Safe: Beat Freaks
- Bottom 2: Quest Crew, Fly Khicks
- Eliminated: Fly Khicks

==== Challenge #2: Last Chance Challenge ====
The two finalists were given one last chance to perform before the lines opened for the final voting session of the season.

| Dance Crew | Performance Title |
|---|---|
| Beat Freaks | Freak the Dream |
| Quest Crew | OrQUESTra |

=== Episode 8: Live Finale ===
- Original Airdate: March 5, 2009

The eliminated crews returned and performed with the finalists for a collaboration. The judges each picked three crews that complemented each other and their dance styles. Instead of going head-to-head, Quest Crew and Beat Freaks teamed up for their last performance.

| Dance Crew(s) | Song |
|---|---|
| Shane Sparks: Quest Crew, Strikers All-Stars, and Dynamic Edition | "Right Round" by Flo Rida |
| JC Chasez: Beat Freaks, Team Millennia and Boxcuttuhz | "Just Dance" by Lady Gaga |
| Lil Mama: Fly Khicks, Ringmasters, and G.O.P Dance | "Numba 1 (Tide Is High)" by Kardinal Offishall feat. Keri Hilson |
| Quest Crew and Beat Freaks | "Beggin'" by Madcon |
| Quest Crew | "On Top of The World'" by T.I. feat. Ludacris |

- Winner: Quest Crew
- Runner-up: Beat Freaks
