= America's Best Dance Crew season 2 =

America's Best Dance Crew
- Season 2
- Hosted by: Mario Lopez
- Judges: JC Chasez; Lil Mama; Shane Sparks
- Winner: Super CR3W

Release
- Original network: MTV
- Original release: June 7 – August 30, 2008

Season chronology
- ← Previous; Season 1 Next → Season 3

The second season of America's Best Dance Crew premiered on June 19, 2008. The live auditions special took place on June 7, 2008. The season was hosted by Mario Lopez, featured Layla Kayleigh as the backstage correspondent, and included Lil Mama, JC Chasez, and Shane Sparks as judges. In the live finale, which aired on August 21, 2008, Super CR3W was declared the winner.

== Cast ==
For the second season of America's Best Dance Crew, the dance crews auditioned in four cities: New York City, Atlanta, Houston, and Los Angeles. A total of fourteen dance crews were selected from the four cities and then categorized into four regions: Midwest, South, East Coast, and West Coast. Following the live casting special on June 7, 2008, the initial pool of dance crews was narrowed down to ten.

Dance Crew	Hometown	Region
A.S.I.I.D.	Detroit, Michigan	Midwest
Boogie Bots	Washington, D.C.	East
Distorted X	Houston, Texas	South
Fanny Pak	Los Angeles, California	West
Full Effect	Chicago, Illinois	Midwest
HIStory	Houston, Texas	South
Phresh Select	Philadelphia, Pennsylvania	East
Sass x7	Piscataway, New Jersey	East
Shhh!	North Bergen, New Jersey	East
SoReal Cru	Houston, Texas	South
Super CR3W	Las Vegas, Nevada	West
Supreme Soul	San Francisco, California	West
Team Millennia	Fullerton, California	West
Xtreme Dance Force	Naperville, Illinois	Midwest

== Results ==
Rank	Dance Crew	Episode										
Rank	Dance Crew	0^{1}	1	2	3	4	5	6	7	8	9^{2}	10
1	Super CR3W	IN	IN	IN	IN	IN	RISK	RISK	IN	RISK	IN	WINNER
2	SoReal Cru	IN	IN	IN	IN	IN	IN	IN	IN	IN	IN	RUNNER-UP
3	Fanny Pak	IN	RISK	IN	IN	IN	IN	IN	RISK	OUT		
4	Boogie Bots	IN	IN	RISK	IN	IN	IN	IN	OUT			
5	Supreme Soul	IN	IN	IN	IN	RISK	IN	OUT				
6	A.S.I.I.D.	IN	IN	IN	IN	IN	OUT					
7	Phresh Select	IN	IN	IN	RISK	OUT						
8	Xtreme Dance Force	IN	IN	IN	OUT							
9	Sass x7	IN	IN	OUT								
10	Distorted X	IN	OUT									
—N/a	Full Effect	OUT										
—N/a	HIStory	OUT										
—N/a	Shhh!	OUT										
—N/a	Team Millennia	OUT										

^Note 1: The live auditions special determined the ten spots for the season premiere.
^Note 2: A non-elimination episode meant to showcase the two finalists.

Key
(WINNER) The dance crew won the competition and was crowned "America's Best Dance Crew".
(RUNNER-UP) The dance crew was the runner-up in the competition.
(IN) The dance crew was safe from elimination.
(RISK) The dance crew was at risk for elimination.
(OUT) The dance crew was eliminated from the competition.

== Episodes ==
=== Episode 0: Casting Special ===
- Original Airdate: June 7, 2008

Fourteen dance crews competed in a live casting special for America's Best Dance Crew. The reigning champions, JabbaWockeeZ, performed to a remix of "The Boss" by Rick Ross featuring T-Pain at the end of the episode.

=== Episode 1: Crew's Choice Challenge ===
- Original Airdate: June 19, 2008

Each crew performed to songs of their own choosing.

Dance Crew	Song
SoReal Cru	"Entourage" by Omarion feat. 50 Cent
Supreme Soul	"Put Your Hands Where My Eyes Could See" by Busta Rhymes
Xtreme Dance Force	"Shawty Get Loose" by Lil Mama feat. T-Pain and Chris Brown
A.S.I.I.D.	"Whatever U Like" by Nicole Scherzinger feat. T.I.
Boogie Bots	"More Bounce To The Ounce" by Zapp & Roger
Super CR3W	"Get Up Offa That Thing" by James Brown
Phresh Select	"Motownphilly" by Boyz II Men
Sass x7	"Damaged" by Danity Kane
Fanny Pak	"Speakerphone" by Kylie Minogue
Distorted X	"Oops (Oh My)" by Tweet feat. Missy Elliott

- Safe: SoReal Cru, Supreme Soul, Xtreme Dance Force, A.S.I.I.D., Boogie Bots, Super CR3W, Phresh Select, Sass x7
- Bottom 2: Fanny Pak, Distorted X
- Eliminated: Distorted X

=== Episode 2: Video Star Challenge ===
- Original Airdate: June 26, 2008

The crews created routines inspired by iconic music videos.

Dance Crew	Song
Super CR3W	"Run It!" by Chris Brown feat. Juelz Santana
Fanny Pak	"Wind It Up" by Gwen Stefani feat. Pharrell
Supreme Soul	"Touch" by Omarion
Phresh Select	"Gimme That" by Chris Brown feat. Lil' Wayne
A.S.I.I.D.	"Like a Boy" by Ciara
SoReal Cru	"Love In This Club" by Usher feat. Young Jeezy
Xtreme Dance Force	"Let Me Love You" by Mario
Boogie Bots	"Bump, Bump, Bump" by B2K feat. P. Diddy
Sass x7	"I’m A Slave 4 U" by Britney Spears

- Safe: Super CR3W, Fanny Pak, Supreme Soul, Phresh Select, A.S.I.I.D., SoReal Cru, Xtreme Dance Force
- Bottom 2: Boogie Bots, Sass x7
- Eliminated: Sass x7

=== Episode 3: Rock the Title Challenge ===
- Original Airdate: July 3, 2008

Each crew utilized a physical transformation to visually illustrate the title of their song.

Dance Crew	Song
A.S.I.I.D.	"Roll" by Flo Rida feat. Sean Kingston
SoReal Cru	"Snake" by R. Kelly
Super CR3W	"We Fly High" by Jim Jones
Boogie Bots	"Game Over" by Lil' Flip
Fanny Pak	"Toy Soldier" by Britney Spears
Supreme Soul	"Elevator" by Flo Rida feat. Timbaland
Phresh Select	"Big Things Poppin' (Do It)" by T.I.
Xtreme Dance Force	"Earthquake" by Tech N9ne

- Safe: A.S.I.I.D., SoReal Cru, Super CR3W, Boogie Bots, Fanny Pak, Supreme Soul
- Bottom 2: Phresh Select, Xtreme Dance Force
- Eliminated: Xtreme Dance Force

=== Episode 4: Speed Up Challenge ===
- Original Airdate: July 10, 2008

The crews had to transition from a slow tempo song to a faster one while still remaining on beat.

Dance Crew	Song
Boogie Bots	"Lollipop" by Lil Wayne feat. Static Major
Super CR3W	“Creator” by Santigold
A.S.I.I.D.	"Dangerous” by Kardinal Offishall feat. Akon
SoReal Cru	"With You" by Chris Brown
Fanny Pak	"Touch My Body" by Mariah Carey
Phresh Select	“Shawty Is a 10” by The-Dream
Supreme Soul	"Party Like a Rockstar" by Shop Boyz

- Safe: Boogie Bots, Super CR3W, A.S.I.I.D., SoReal Cru, Fanny Pak
- Bottom 2: Phresh Select, Supreme Soul
- Eliminated: Phresh Select

=== Episode 5: Janet Jackson Challenge ===
- Original Airdate: July 17, 2008

The episode began with a group performance to Janet Jackson's "Rhythm Nation". Then, each crew was given a Janet Jackson song and had to incorporate her signature style and moves into their dance.

Dance Crew	Song
Fanny Pak	"All Nite (Don't Stop)"
Supreme Soul	"Nasty"
Boogie Bots	"Control"
SoReal Cru	"I Get Lonely"
Super CR3W	"Black Cat"
A.S.I.I.D.	"If"

- Safe: Fanny Pak, Supreme Soul, Boogie Bots, SoReal Cru
- Bottom 2: Super CR3W, A.S.I.I.D.
- Eliminated: A.S.I.I.D.

=== Episode 6: Bring The Beat Challenge ===
- Original Airdate: July 24, 2008

The crews were assigned a song and a school activity. They were required to utilize the stage props, themed after a high school gym, to create the beats for their routine.

Dance Crew	Song	Activity
Fanny Pak	"Spaz" by N.E.R.D	Physical education
SoReal Cru	"Tambourine" by Eve feat. Swizz Beatz and Sean Garrett	Band practice
Boogie Bots	"Universal Mind Control" by Common feat. Pharrell	Bench warmers
Super CR3W	"Don't Touch Me (Throw da Water on 'em)" by Busta Rhymes	Basketball
Supreme Soul	"Church" by T-Pain	Ice Hockey

- Safe: Fanny Pak, SoReal Cru, Boogie Bots
- Bottom 2: Super CR3W, Supreme Soul
- Eliminated: Supreme Soul

=== Episode 7: Missy Elliott Challenge ===
- Original Airdate: July 31, 2008

The episode opened with a group performance to Missy Elliott's "Shake Your Pom Pom". Afterwards, the crews adapted the footwork from her music videos to showcase their own style. Elliott starred as the first guest judge on America's Best Dance Crew, helping the regular judges select which crew was eliminated.

Dance Crew	Song
SoReal Cru	"One Minute Man"
Super CR3W	"We Run This"
Boogie Bots	"Work It"
Fanny Pak	"Get Ur Freak On"

- Safe: SoReal Cru, Super CR3W
- Bottom 2: Boogie Bots, Fanny Pak
- Eliminated: Boogie Bots

=== Episode 8: Eighties Theme Challenge ===
- Original Airdate: August 7, 2008

The remaining three crews competed in two challenges inspired by the 1980s.

==== Challenge #1: Groove Step Challenge ====
Each crew built routines featuring popular party dances from the '80s. In addition, the crews had to complete the physical task assigned to them.

Dance Crew	Dance	Songlist	Challenge
Super CR3W	The Humpty Dance	"Bust A Move" by Young MC > "The Humpty Dance" by Digital Underground > "Word Up!" by Cameo	Perform the move with only four feet on the floor.
SoReal Cru	Kid N' Play	"Poison" by Bell Biv DeVoe > "Now That We Found Love" by Heavy D and the Boyz > "Every Little Step" by Bobby Brown	Create a chain reaction during the routine.
Fanny Pak	Vanilla Ice	"Lean On Me" by Club Nouveau > New Jack Swing" by Wreckx-n-Effect > "Ice Ice Baby" by Vanilla Ice	Perform the move horizontally.

==== Challenge #2: Dance Movie Challenge ====
The crews crafted routines that incorporated elements of classic '80s films. The crews were given remixed versions of the songs from their respective movies.

Dance Crew	Song	Movie
SoReal Cru	"Tour de France"	Breakin'
Super CR3W	"Footloose"	Footloose
Fanny Pak	"Maniac"	Flashdance

- Safe: SoReal Cru
- Bottom 2: Super CR3W, Fanny Pak
- Eliminated: Fanny Pak

=== Episode 9: Championship Showdown ===
- Original Airdate: August 14, 2008

In a non-elimination episode, the final two crews faced off in three rounds of challenges.

==== Challenge #1: Around the World Challenge ====
Dancing to the same mix of songs, the crews created routines that included different dance styles from around the world.

Song
"Mas Que Nada" by Sérgio Mendes feat. The Black Eyed Peas
"We Be Burnin'" by Sean Paul
"The Anthem" by Pitbull feat. Lil Jon
"Mundian To Bach Ke" by Panjabi MC feat. Twista

==== Challenge #2: Original Dance Craze Challenge ====
Working with music producers to write and create an original soundtrack, the crews had to create their own dance craze.

Dance Crew	Song
Super CR3W	'S' To The Chest
SoReal Cru	Smash It Up

==== Challenge #3: Last Chance Challenge ====
The two finalists were given one last chance to perform before the lines opened for the final voting session of the season.

Dance Crew	Song
Super CR3W	"Give It Up or Turn It Loose" by James Brown
SoReal Cru	"A Milli" by Lil Wayne

=== Episode 10: The Live Finale ===
- Original Airdate: August 21, 2008

The eliminated crews returned and performed with the finalists for a regional collaboration. Instead of going head-to-head, Super CR3W and SoReal Cru teamed up for their last performance.

Dance Crew(s)	Song
Super CR3W and SoReal Cru	"Puttin' on the Ritz", "It's Me Snitches" by Swizz Beatz and "In the Ayer" by Flo Rida feat. will.i.am
East: Boogie Bots, Phresh Select, and Sass x7	"Run the Show" by Kat DeLuna feat. Busta Rhymes
South: SoReal Cru and Distorted X	"Get Like Me" by David Banner feat. Chris Brown
Midwest: A.S.I.I.D. and Xtreme Dance Force	"Touch the Sky" by Kanye West feat. Lupe Fiasco
West: Super CR3W, Fanny Pak, and Supreme Soul	"Go Hard or Go Home" by E-40
Super CR3W	"Dope Boys" by The Game feat. Travis Barker

- Winner: Super CR3W
- Runner-up: SoReal Cru

=== Episode 11: Battle for the VMAs ===
- Original Airdate: August 30, 2008

At the beginning of the show, champions JabbaWockeeZ and Super CR3W performed to a remix of "We Are the Champions" by Queen.

Five crews from the first and second seasons were given music videos nominated for "Best Dancing in a Video" at the 2008 MTV Video Music Awards. The crews had to incorporate the moves from the videos while retaining their own style. In the end, the judges chose their three favorite performances. After votes were cast, the two crews with the highest number of votes would perform at the VMA preshow.

Dance Crew	Song
Kaba Modern (Season 1)	"4 Minutes" by Madonna feat. Justin Timberlake
Breaksk8 (Season 1)	"Closer" by Ne-Yo
SoReal Cru (Season 2)	"Forever" by Chris Brown
Fanny Pak (Season 2)	"When I Grow Up" by the Pussycat Dolls
Status Quo (Season 1)	"Damaged" by Danity Kane

Fanny Pak and Kaba Modern were eventually selected to compete against each other at the preshow.

Lindsay Lohan and Ciara later announced that Fanny Pak was the winner of the battle and received $25,000 (USD) for charity.
