= Jason Dundas =

Australian-born television presenter

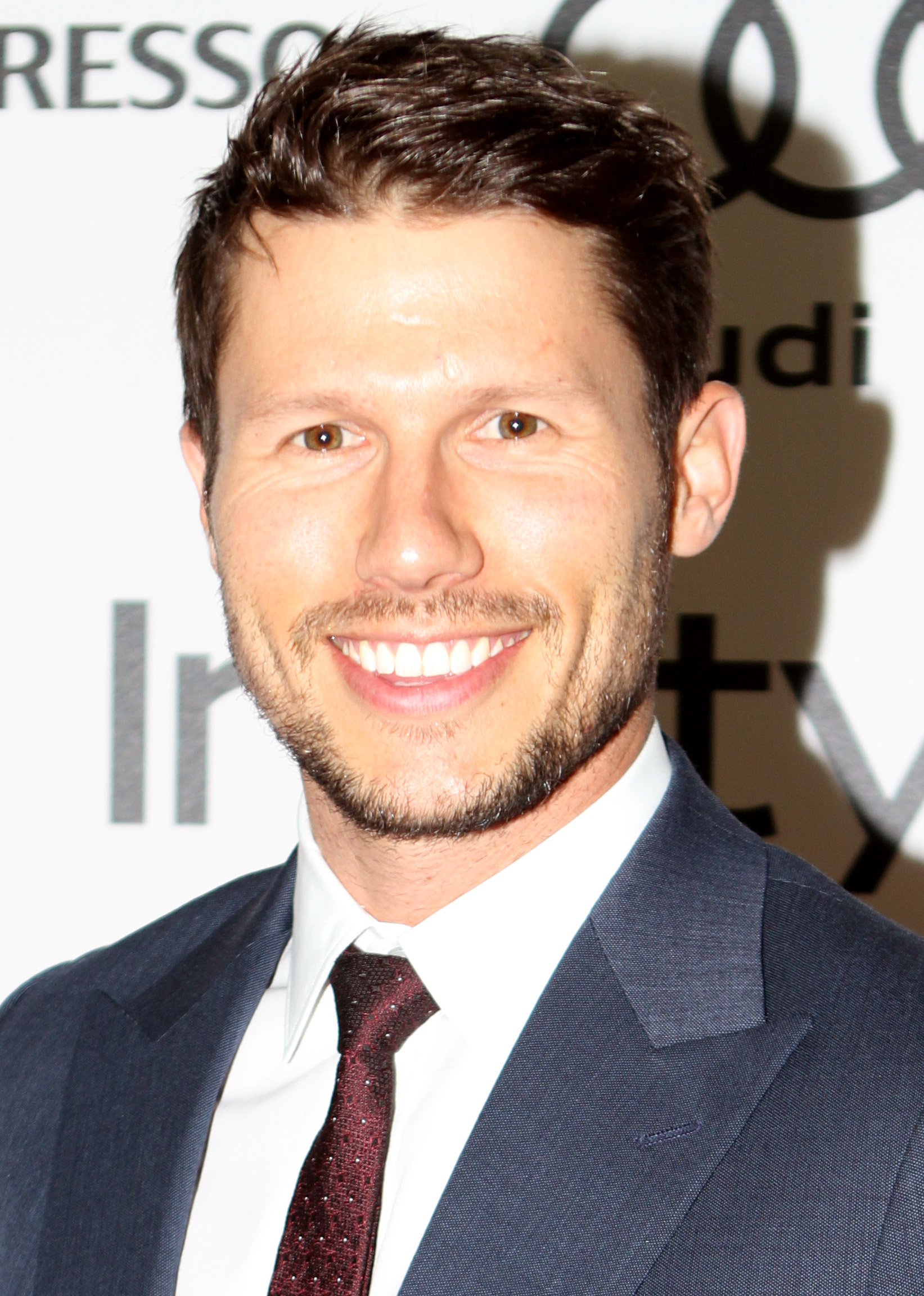
- Dundas at the InStyle Awards, May 2015
- Born: Jason Robert Dundas; 25 July 1982 (age 44); Penrith, Sydney, Australia
- Occupations: TV host, producer
- Years active: 2003–present
- Website: www.jasondundas.com

Jason Dundas (born 25 July 1982) is an Australian-born television presenter, actor, producer and director, known for his roles as special correspondent for CBS's Entertainment Tonight, the host of The X Factor Australia in 2016, host of America's Best Dance Crew on MTV, VH1's Big Morning Buzz Live, travel series Getaway in Australia, and the founder and director of Dundas Media.

== Personal life ==
Dundas was born in Penrith, Sydney to Ross and Diane Dundas.

He attended Jamison High School, and later went on to study at the School of Communication Arts at the University of Western Sydney where he studied a Bachelor of Design (Visual Communication).

He won a contest to be the host of MTV Australia in 2003, after creating his own DIY video audition from his bedroom at 19 years old.

Dundas is married to Tayler Blackman.

== Career ==
=== Filmography ===
Year	Title	Role	Notes
2003	MTV Homebuzz Australia	Host	MTV Australia
2004–2006	MTV TRL Australia	Host	MTV Australia
2004–2005	MTV News Australia	Host	MTV Australia
2004	MTV Europe Music Awards	Red carpet reporter	MTV Europe Music Awards
2005	MTV Australia Video Music Awards	Co-presenter	MTV Australia
2005–2006	Snow Cave MTV Australia	Host	MTV Australia
2005–2006	Beach House MTV Australia	Host	MTV Australia
2005–2006	Back Door To...	Host	MTV Australia
2006	Full Tank MTV Australia	Host	MTV Australia
2006	MTV Australia Video Music Awards	Co-presenter	MTV Australia
2006–current	Getaway	Presenter	Nine Network
2007–2009	20 to 1	Panelist	Nine Network
2008	MTV Australia Video Music Awards	Co-presenter	MTV Australia
2009	MTV Australia Video Music Awards	Co-presenter	MTV Australia
2009	Logie Awards Australia	Presenter	Nine Network
2011–2012	VH1 Big Morning Buzz Live USA	Pop-culture correspondent	MTV Australia
2012	VH1 Do Something Awards USA	Co-host	VH1
2012	VH1 Fan Jam USA	Co-host	VH1
2012	VH1 Divas USA	Correspondent	VH1
2012	Big Evening Buzz USA	Co-host	VH1
2012	VH1 Top 20 Video Countdown USA	Host (One episode, 3 November 2012)	VH1
2012	CNN Showbiz Tonight USA	Panelist on 2 episodes	CNN
2012	New Year's Eve 2012 Australia	Co-host	Nine Network
2013–2014	VH1 Big Morning Buzz Live USA	Co-host	VH1
2013	VH1 Best Super Bowl Concert Ever USA	Co-host	VH1
2014	The Big Adventure	Host	Seven Network
2014–2015	Beyond Dance/America's Best Dance Crew	Host	MTV
2015	Entertainment Tonight	Special correspondent	CBS
2016	The X Factor Australia	Host	Seven Network
2019	Page Six TV	Co-host	Fox
2019–2020	BUILD Stopover	Host	Verizon Media
2019–current	The Watchlist	Creator, Host & Executive Producer	Foxtel
2020	Fire Fight Australia	Co-host	Foxtel
2021	Yahoo Finance	Correspondent	Yahoo

=== Film ===
Year	Film	Role	Notes
2008	Fool's Gold	Frat Boy 1	Warner Bros. Pictures
2012	Hardflip	Ryder	Skipstone Pictures

=== TV ===
Year	Program	Role	Notes
2010	Sea Patrol	Jack Fiene	Nine Network

=== Production ===
==== Dundas Media ====
After studying graphic design at Sydney's School of Design, Dundas sold his first TV show to MTV when he was 21-years-old. He currently runs a Hollywood-based video production company, Dundas Media.

In 2019 Dundas created the weekly entertainment TV show The Watchlist from LA for Foxtel Australia. He is the show's executive producer, co-writer and host with the series currently in its fourth season with over 700 short-form episodes.

=== Entrepreneur ===
==== Dundas Fit ====
As an entrepreneur, Dundas became the second men's ambassador of Australian department store David Jones. In this role, he fronted fashion campaigns Miranda Kerr and Jessica Gomes, starred in and produced video series, and developed his own activewear brand DundasFit, sold in 35 stores in Australia.
