= Layla Kayleigh =

British-American TV personality

- Born: Zara Layla Rumi Kayleigh; London, England
- Occupations: Television host, philanthropist
- Spouse: Chris Warren (m. 2019)
- Children: 2

Layla Kayleigh is a British-American television personality. She used to host The Feed segment of G4's Attack of the Show! and co-hosted MTV's America's Best Dance Crew where she was the backstage correspondent. She also hosted MTV reunions for shows such as Teen Mom and Teen Wolf. She has been featured in several magazines including Maxim magazine to promote her projects and shows.

== Personal life ==
Kayleigh lived in West London. Her birth name is Zara, but she urged her parents to call her by her middle name, Layla, after the Derek and the Dominos song. When Kayleigh was 12, her single mother travelled to America in a bid to get US citizenship for them, but Layla Kayleigh opted to stay behind. She "never told a soul" about being alone for fear that social services would come for her.

Layla attended St.Marylebone School, a Christian school near Baker Street. Layla skipped two grades in the English school system and graduated younger than her classmates. She majored in psychology with a minor in English literature and graduated with honours. She also attended Sylvia Young Theatre School for drama and dance.

On 11 September 2008, Kayleigh became a naturalised United States citizen.

Kayleigh married actor Chris Warren on 23 May 2019. They have two children.

== Career ==
Kayleigh has previously hosted MTV2 in Britain and ABC's football halftime show. Kayleigh was once a correspondent for Al Gore's Current TV but was fired after doing an interview and photoshoot with Maxim Magazine. Kayleigh has also appeared on the MTV show Punk'd.

Kayleigh was the main host of The Feed, a news segment of Attack of the Show! on G4, as well as shortened versions of The Feed during the network's commercial breaks.

Kayleigh has also been a correspondent for The Best Damn Sports Show Period on Fox Sports Net, an entertainment and sports new reported on The Insider, and a guest on Red Eye w/ Greg Gutfeld. Kayleigh hosted Season VI of the World Poker Tour, broadcast by Game Show Network in 2008.

Kayleigh worked as a road correspondent looking for talent in different cities for MTV's America's Best Dance Crew. The show, hosted by Mario Lopez, premiered on 26 January 2008 with a live casting special and began its first season on 7 February 2008 with Kayleigh as backstage correspondent interviewing the bottom two crews. Season 2 of America's Best Dance Crew started on 19 June 2008 on MTV. Season 3 premiered on 15 January 2009.

On 16 March 2009, in an episode of Attack of the Show!, Kayleigh announced that she would be leaving G4 due to her pregnancy and going on an indefinite hiatus to be a stay-at-home mother.

On 7 and 27 May 2010, Kayleigh appeared as a member of the Great American Panel on Hannity. She was a correspondent for the TV Guide Network.

She was listed 33rd and 88th on AskMen's top 99 women in 2008 and 2011, respectively. She appeared in lingerie for a 2011 PETA ad campaign protesting the use of animals in product-testing experiments, photographed by Nick Saglimbeni.

In April 2012, Layla hosted the MTV special reunion shows for Teen Mom and Teen Wolf.

In 2014, Kayleigh became a weekly correspondent on Vh1's Big Morning Buzz Live discussing pop culture and current events from around the world as part of a round table discussion. The show was cancelled in August 2015.
