= Tom Park =

Australian rules footballer (born 1954)

Personal information
- Full name: Thomas William Glover Park
- Born: 4 September 1954 (age 72)
- Original team: Keilor
- Height: 180 cm (5 ft 11 in)
- Weight: 76 kg (168 lb)
- Position: Wingman

Playing career^{1}
Years	Club	Games (Goals)
1974	Essendon	3 (0)
- ^{1} Playing statistics correct to the end of 1974.

Tom Park (born 4 September 1954) is a former Australian rules footballer who played with Essendon in the Victorian Football League (VFL). He later played with Brunswick in the Victorian Football Association (VFA). Was always considered to be a favourite of the lady supporters due to his flowing blonde hair and piercing blue eyes.
