= America's Best Dance Crew =

American competitive dance reality television series

- Season 1–7 logo
- Also known as: Randy Jackson Presents America's Best Dance Crew
- Genre: Competitive dance; Interactive; Reality
- Created by: Howard Schwartz; Karen Schwartz
- Directed by: Michael Simon; Ryan Polito
- Presented by: Mario Lopez; Layla Kayleigh; Jason Dundas
- Judges: JC Chasez; Lil Mama; Shane Sparks; Omarion; D-Trix; T-Pain; Teyana Taylor; Frankie Grande
- Composers: Dylan R. Berry; Noah Lifschey
- Country of origin: United States
- Original language: English
- No. of seasons: 8
- No. of episodes: 73

Production
- Executive producers: Randy Jackson; Joel Gallen; Josh Greenberg; Abe Hoch; Rob Lee; Howard Schwartz; Karen Schwartz; Harriet Sternberg; Austin Wagner; Jane Y. Mun; Joe Gallon
- Producers: Tom Park; Deondray Gossett; Quincy LeNear
- Production locations: Warner Bros. Studios, Burbank, California
- Cinematography: Scott Hylton
- Running time: 60–90 minutes
- Production companies: Tenth Planet Productions; Bayonne Entertainment; Hip-hop International; Dream Merchant 21 Entertainment; Warner Horizon Television

Original release
- Network: MTV
- Release: January 26, 2008 – August 29, 2015

America's Best Dance Crew, often abbreviated as ABDC, is an American competitive dance reality television series featuring both national and international dance crews. The show was produced by singer, record producer, and former American Idol judge Randy Jackson. The series premiered on January 26, 2008, on MTV. It was originally developed for NBC as World Moves.

The show was hosted by actor Mario Lopez and featured television personality Layla Kayleigh as the backstage correspondent. The judging panel consisted of hip-hop recording artist Lil Mama, singer-songwriter JC Chasez, and dancer Dominic "D-Trix" Sandoval. Former judges included hip-hop choreographer Shane Sparks and R&B singer Omarion.

After an initial seventh season run, America's Best Dance Crew was cancelled in 2012 due to declining ratings. However, on January 10, 2015, MTV announced that the series would be revived for an eighth season.

The eighth season, titled America's Best Dance Crew All-Stars: Road to the VMAs, premiered on July 29, 2015. Hosted by Jason Dundas, the revival featured a new judging panel: hip-hop artist T-Pain, recording artist Teyana Taylor, and Broadway performer Frankie Grande.

== Format ==
America's Best Dance Crew is a reality competition where dance crews showcase their talent and compete for a $100,000 (USD) grand prize and the golden ABDC trophy (a figure of a b-boy doing a freeze, with its legs moving like a bobblehead). Each week, the crews are given a challenge. The challenges are different for each crew, but have the same general concept or share a specific theme. To begin each episode, host Mario Lopez reveals, in no particular order, which crews are safe and which crews are at risk for elimination. After the crews in the bottom perform their routines, the judges decide which crew will advance to the next round. When a crew is eliminated, the contestants are allowed to dance one final time on the stage as they "walk it out" to the song of the same name.

=== Judging ===
Judges on America's Best Dance Crew
Judge	Season							
Judge	1	2	3	4	5	6	7	8
Mario Lopez								
JC Chasez								
Lil Mama								
Shane Sparks								
Omarion								
D-Trix								
Jason Dundas								
T-Pain								
Teyana Taylor								
Frankie Grande								

Key
Host of America's Best Dance Crew
Judge of America's Best Dance Crew

== Series overview ==
Season	Episodes	Originally released		Winner
Season	Episodes	First released	Last released	Winner
1	8	January 26, 2008	March 27, 2008	Jabbawockeez
2	11	June 7, 2008	August 30, 2008	Super CR3W
3	8	January 15, 2009	March 5, 2009	Quest Crew
4	8	August 9, 2009	September 27, 2009	We Are Heroes
5	12	January 28, 2010	April 15, 2010	Poreotix
6	10	April 7, 2011	June 5, 2011	I.aM.mE
7	10	April 11, 2012	June 13, 2012	Elektrolytes
8	6	July 29, 2015	August 29, 2015	Quest Crew

== Controversy ==
MTV and Randy Jackson, the executive producer of America's Best Dance Crew, were sued by Dwight McGhee, professionally known as rapper Citizen Charlie Kane, in 2010, claiming that the defendants had stolen McGhee's idea for a television show. McGhee claimed in the lawsuit, filed at Los Angeles County Superior Court, that he had pitched a similar series titled International Breakerz League, which also featured a dance crew, to the network in 2004. McGhee sought $2 million in damages.

== International distribution ==
ABDC airs on MTV in the Caribbean, Spain, Italy, Portugal, Argentina, Russia (by the alias of "Короли Танцпола", lit. "Kings of the Dancefloor"), Finland, Hungary, Netherlands, Norway, and the United Kingdom, Germany, Ukraine (by the alias of "Танцювальні бої", lit. "Dance Battles"), and Romania.

In Canada, the show airs on both MuchMusic and Musique Plus (the episodes on MP are 2 years late) and in Latin America, the show airs on Warner Channel. The show also airs on AB1 and MTV France, where it is called Dance Crew USA in France, Solar TV, Jack TV, and The Game Channel in the Philippines, Fiji One in Fiji, and YAN TV (?), VTV3 (Nhom nhay sieu Viet, 2021) in Vietnam.

== Additional notes ==
- The opening title sequence created by Framework Studio won a Telly Award in 2009.
