= America's Best Dance Crew season 1 =

America's Best Dance Crew
- Season 1
- Hosted by: Mario Lopez
- Judges: JC Chasez; Lil Mama; Shane Sparks
- Winner: JabbaWockeeZ

Release
- Original network: MTV
- Original release: January 26 – March 27, 2008

Season chronology
- Next → Season 2

The first season of America's Best Dance Crew premiered on January 26, 2008. The season, hosted by Mario Lopez, featured a judging panel consisting of Lil Mama, JC Chasez, and Shane Sparks. In the live finale, which aired on March 27, 2008, JabbaWockeeZ was declared the winner.

== Cast ==
For the first season of America's Best Dance Crew, the competitors auditioned in four cities: New York City, Atlanta, Chicago, and Los Angeles. A total of twelve dance crews were selected from the four cities and then categorized into four regions: Midwest, South, East Coast, and West Coast. Following the live casting special on January 26, 2008, the initial pool of dance crews was narrowed down to nine.

Dance Crew	Hometown	Region
Automatic Response	Phoenix, Arizona	West
Breaksk8	Kokomo, Indiana	Midwest
Enigma Dance Kru	Tampa, Florida	South
Femme 5	Chicago, Illinois	Midwest
Full Out	West Palm Beach, Florida	South
Fysh n Chicks	Los Angeles, California	West
ICONic	Englishtown, New Jersey	East
JabbaWockeeZ	San Diego, California	West
Kaba Modern	Orange County, California	West
Live in Color	Miami, Florida	South
Status Quo	Boston, Massachusetts	East
The Movement	New York, New York	East

== Results ==
Rank	Dance Crew	Episodes								
Rank	Dance Crew	0^{1}	1	2	3	4	5	6	7	8
1	JabbaWockeeZ	SAFE	SAFE	SAFE	SAFE	SAFE	SAFE	SAFE	RISK	WINNER
2	Status Quo	SAFE	SAFE	SAFE	RISK	SAFE	SAFE	SAFE	SAFE	RUNNER-UP
3	Kaba Modern	SAFE	SAFE	SAFE	SAFE	SAFE	SAFE	RISK	ELIM	
4	Breaksk8	SAFE	SAFE	SAFE	SAFE	SAFE	RISK	ELIM		
5	Fysh n Chicks	SAFE	SAFE	RISK	SAFE	RISK	ELIM			
6	Live in Color	SAFE	SAFE	SAFE	SAFE	ELIM				
7	ICONic	SAFE	RISK	SAFE	ELIM					
8	Femme 5	SAFE	SAFE	ELIM						
9	Enigma Dance Kru	SAFE	ELIM							
—N/a	Automatic Response	ELIM								
—N/a	Full Out	ELIM								
—N/a	The Movement	ELIM								

^Note 1: The live auditions special determined the nine spots for the season premiere.

Key
(WINNER) The dance crew won the competition and was crowned "America's Best Dance Crew".
(RUNNER-UP) The dance crew was the runner-up in the competition.
(SAFE) The dance crew was safe from elimination.
(SAFE) The dance crew was safe from elimination and advanced from the live auditions to the competition.
(RISK) The dance crew was at risk for elimination.
(ELIM) The dance crew was eliminated from the competition.
(ELIM) The dance crew was eliminated from the live auditions and did not advance to the competition.

== Episodes ==
=== Episode 0: The Search Begins ===
- Original Airdate: January 26, 2008

Twelve dance crews competed in a live casting special for America's Best Dance Crew.

=== Episode 1: The Battle Begins ===
- Original Airdate: February 7, 2008

Each crew performed to a mix of their favorite dance track. The crews were broken up into groups of three. The judges selected one crew from each group (italicized) to be safe from elimination and move on to the next week. Afterwards, the judges picked the bottom two crews to compete in a sudden death dance-off to guest performer Flo Rida's song "Low".

Round	Dance Crew	Song
Round 1	Live in Color	"Watch Them Roll" by Sean Paul
Round 1	JabbaWockeeZ	"Apologize" by Timbaland feat. OneRepublic
Round 1	Fysh n Chicks	"Whine Up" by Kat DeLuna feat. Elephant Man
Round 2	Status Quo	"Good Vibrations" by Marky Mark
Round 2	Femme 5	"Do It Well" by Jennifer Lopez
Round 2	Enigma Dance Kru	"I'm So Hood" by DJ Khaled, Trick Daddy, Rick Ross, T-Pain and Plies
Round 3	ICONic	"Cyclone" by Baby Bash feat. T-Pain
Round 3	Breaksk8	"Get It Shawty" by Lloyd
Round 3	Kaba Modern	"Technologic" by Daft Punk

- Safe: Live in Color, Status Quo, Kaba Modern, JabbaWockeeZ, Breaksk8, Fysh n Chicks, Femme 5
- Bottom 2: Enigma Dance Kru, ICONic
- Eliminated: Enigma Dance Kru

=== Episode 2: Music Video Moves ===
- Original Airdate: February 14, 2008

Each crew was given a different music video containing a dance sequence, which they had to perform while maintaining their own style.

Dance Crew	Song
Kaba Modern	"Wall to Wall" by Chris Brown
Live in Color	"Hey Mama" by The Black Eyed Peas
JabbaWockeeZ	"Ice Box" by Omarion
Breaksk8	"Get Up" by Ciara feat. Chamillionaire
ICONic	"Kiss Kiss" by Chris Brown feat. T-Pain
Status Quo	"U Can't Touch This" by MC Hammer
Fysh n Chicks	"Freakum Dress" by Beyoncé
Femme 5	"Hollaback Girl" by Gwen Stefani

- Safe: Kaba Modern, Live in Color, JabbaWockeeZ, Breaksk8, ICONic, Status Quo
- Bottom 2: Fysh n Chicks, Femme 5
- Eliminated: Femme 5

=== Episode 3: Dance Craze Challenge ===
- Original Airdate: February 21, 2008

Each crew performed a popular dance, also known as a "dance craze", while preserving their own style. Since some of the dance crazes were very simple to execute, each team had to complete an additional challenge while performing.

Dance Crew	Song	Challenge
Live in Color	"2 Step" by Unk	Exchange clothes during their routine.
JabbaWockeeZ	"Lean wit It, Rock wit It" by Dem Franchize Boyz	Create an illusion that defies gravity.
Breaksk8	"Cupid Shuffle" by Cupid	Stay physically connected in a section of the Cupid Shuffle.
Kaba Modern	"G-Slide (Tour Bus)" by Lil Mama	Partner up and perform a lift.
Fysh n Chicks	"It's Goin Down" by Yung Joc	Perform some of the steps in reverse.
Status Quo	"Crank That (Soulja Boy)" by Soulja Boy	Perform a portion of the dance upside down.
ICONic	"Chicken Noodle Soup" by DJ Webstar	Perform a portion of the dance on their backs.

- Safe: Live in Color, JabbaWockeeZ, Breaksk8, Kaba Modern, Fysh n Chicks
- Bottom 2: Status Quo, ICONic
- Eliminated: ICONic

=== Episode 4: Movie Characters ===
- Original Airdate: February 28, 2008

The crews portrayed movie characters through dance.

Dance Crew	Song	Character
JabbaWockeeZ	"Ayo Technology" by 50 Cent feat. Justin Timberlake	Thieves
Kaba Modern	"Sensual Seduction" by Snoop Dogg	Geeky boys and popular girls
Status Quo	"Hey Baby (Jump Off)" by Bow Wow and Omarion	Tuners
Breaksk8	"What Is It" by Baby Bash feat. Sean Kingston	Basketball players
Fysh 'n Chicks	"Maneater" by Nelly Furtado	Business women letting loose
Live in Color	"B.O.B. (Bombs Over Baghdad)" by Outkast	Vampires and damsels in distress

- Safe: JabbaWockeeZ, Kaba Modern, Status Quo, Breaksk8
- Bottom 2: Fysh n Chicks, Live in Color
- Eliminated: Live in Color

=== Episode 5: Thriller ===
- Original Airdate: March 6, 2008

Each crew performed to a track from Michael Jackson's Thriller album, in honor of its 25th anniversary, and incorporated Jackson's signature moves into their routine.

Dance Crew	Song
Status Quo	"Wanna Be Startin' Somethin'"
JabbaWockeeZ	"P.Y.T. (Pretty Young Thing)"
Kaba Modern	"Thriller"
Fysh n Chicks	"Billie Jean"
Breaksk8	"Beat It"

- Safe: Status Quo, JabbaWockeeZ, Kaba Modern
- Bottom 2: Fysh n Chicks, Breaksk8
- Eliminated: Fysh n Chicks

=== Episode 6: Broadway Remixed ===
- Original Airdate: March 13, 2008

At the beginning of the show, the crews teamed up to perform a routine to a hip hop remix of Annie's "It's the Hard Knock Life". Then, each crew had to transform a traditional Broadway number into a hip hop routine.

Dance Crew	Musical	Song
Status Quo	Hairspray	"You Can't Stop the Beat"
JabbaWockeeZ	Chicago	"All That Jazz"
Kaba Modern	Grease	"You're the One That I Want"
Breaksk8	Dreamgirls	"One Night Only"

- Safe: Status Quo, JabbaWockeeZ
- Bottom 2: Kaba Modern, Breaksk8
- Eliminated: Breaksk8

=== Episode 7: Evolution of Street Dance ===
- Original Airdate: March 20, 2008

All three crews performed to a same remix highlighting the evolution of street dancing over the past 30 years.

Song	Dance
"Funkytown" by Lipps Inc	Locking
"It's Like That" by Run DMC vs. Jason Nevins	Popping
"It's Just Begun" by Jimmy Castor	Breaking
"Push It" by Salt-n-Pepa	New jack swing
"Bye Bye Bye" by 'N Sync	Pop
"Get Buck in Here" by DJ Felli Fel	New school/Krumping

- Safe: Status Quo
- Bottom 2: JabbaWockeeZ, Kaba Modern
- Eliminated: Kaba Modern

The two finalists compete in an encore "do or die" round.

Dance Crew	Performance Title
Status Quo	Jack in the Box
JabbaWockeeZ	The Red Pill

=== Episode 8: The Live Finale ===
- Original Airdate: March 27, 2008

The eliminated crews returned and performed with the finalists for a regional collaboration. Instead of going head-to-head, JabbaWockeeZ and Status Quo teamed up for their last performance.

Dance Crew(s)	Song
West: JabbaWockeeZ, Kaba Modern, and Fysh n Chicks	"Tell Me When To Go" by E-40 feat. Keak Da Sneak
South: Live in Color and Enigma Dance Kru	"Get Low" by Lil Jon and The Eastside Boys
East: Status Quo and ICONic	"Phenomenon" by LL Cool J
Midwest: Breaksk8 and Femme 5	"Pop, Lock & Drop It" by Huey
JabbaWockeeZ and Status Quo	Stomp the Yard
JabbaWockeeZ	"Stronger" by Kanye West

- Winner: JabbaWockeeZ
- Runner-up: Status Quo
