= Shane Sparks =

American hip-hop choreographer (born 1969)

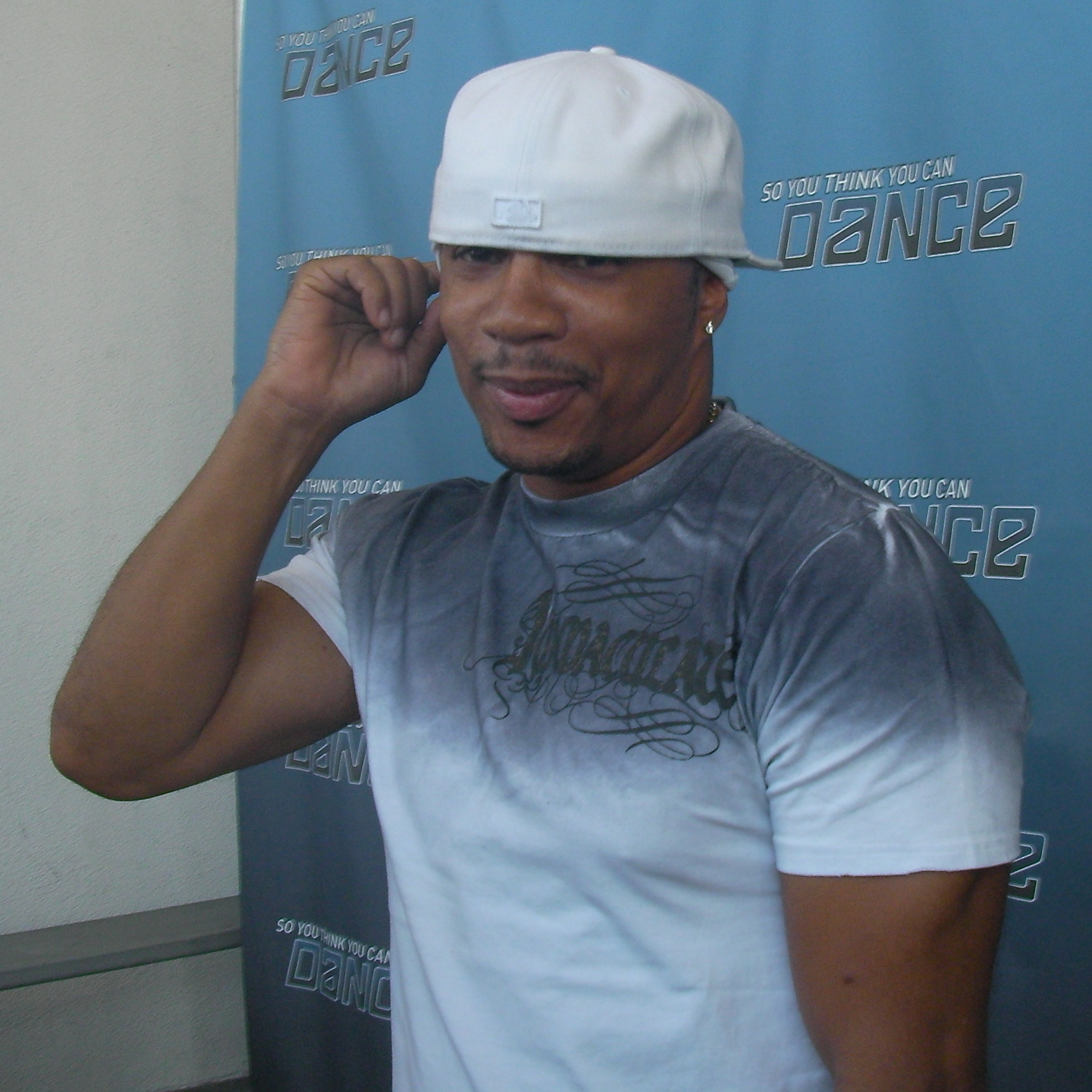
- Sparks in 2008
- Born: Melvin Shane Sparks; June 25, 1969 (age 57); Cincinnati, Ohio, U.S.
- Occupation: Hip-hop choreographer
- Children: 1

Melvin Shane Sparks (born June 25, 1969) is an American hip hop choreographer best known for his work as a choreographer on So You Think You Can Dance and judge on America's Best Dance Crew.

== Early life ==
Sparks was born on June 25, 1969, in Cincinnati, Ohio. He is the youngest of three children born to Melvin and Wanda Sparks, both police officers. Sparks spent some time in the hospital after his birth due to scoliosis.

Sparks became interested in dance at the age of 11 when he started performing in talent shows. His interest in teaching became apparent when he started offering dance lessons from his own backyard. Dance became extremely important to Sparks after his sister's boyfriend was murdered, as it became a way for him to escape and feel safe.

== Career ==
=== Dance career ===
In 1993, Sparks moved to Los Angeles. Three months after his move, he was offered a chance to substitute a hip-hop class at the Millennium Dance Complex, formerly known as Moro Landis, located in the North Hollywood Arts District. He soon became an assistant for this hip-hop class. When the teacher left, he took over the whole class. Due to his skill as a teacher and dancer, his class expanded from only three people to a record high of 175 people.

=== So You Think You Can Dance ===
Sparks is best known for being one of the judges and choreographers on the reality dance competition, So You Think You Can Dance. According to TV Guide, Gaynor accepted the role.

The show features a broad variety of American and international dance styles including classical, contemporary, ballroom, hip-hop, street, club, jazz, and musical theatre styles, amongst others, with many subgenres within the categories represented.

=== America's Best Dance Crew ===
Sparks was a judge on MTV's dance competition reality show America's Best Dance Crew from seasons 1 to 4. He did not return to judge for the fifth season due to his arrest. Singer Omarion replaced Sparks during season 5. Omarion left after season 5, so he could focus on his music career. In season 6, D-Trix from Quest crew took over the spot as the third judge.

== Legal issues ==
Sparks was arrested on December 18, 2009, on a felony warrant. Dancer M F alleged that Sparks sexually assaulted her while she was underage multiple times. Sparks pled no contest and was charged with committing sexual intercourse with a minor under the age of 16. He said that he believed she was of legal age because she worked behind the front desk at the studio. He was sentenced to serve 135 days in a "pay-to-stay" jail and did so over the course of two years while continuing to work and travel internationally. Sparks was not required to register as a sex offender under the terms of his no contest plea.
