= Jarppi Leppälä =

Finnish stunt performer (born 1979)

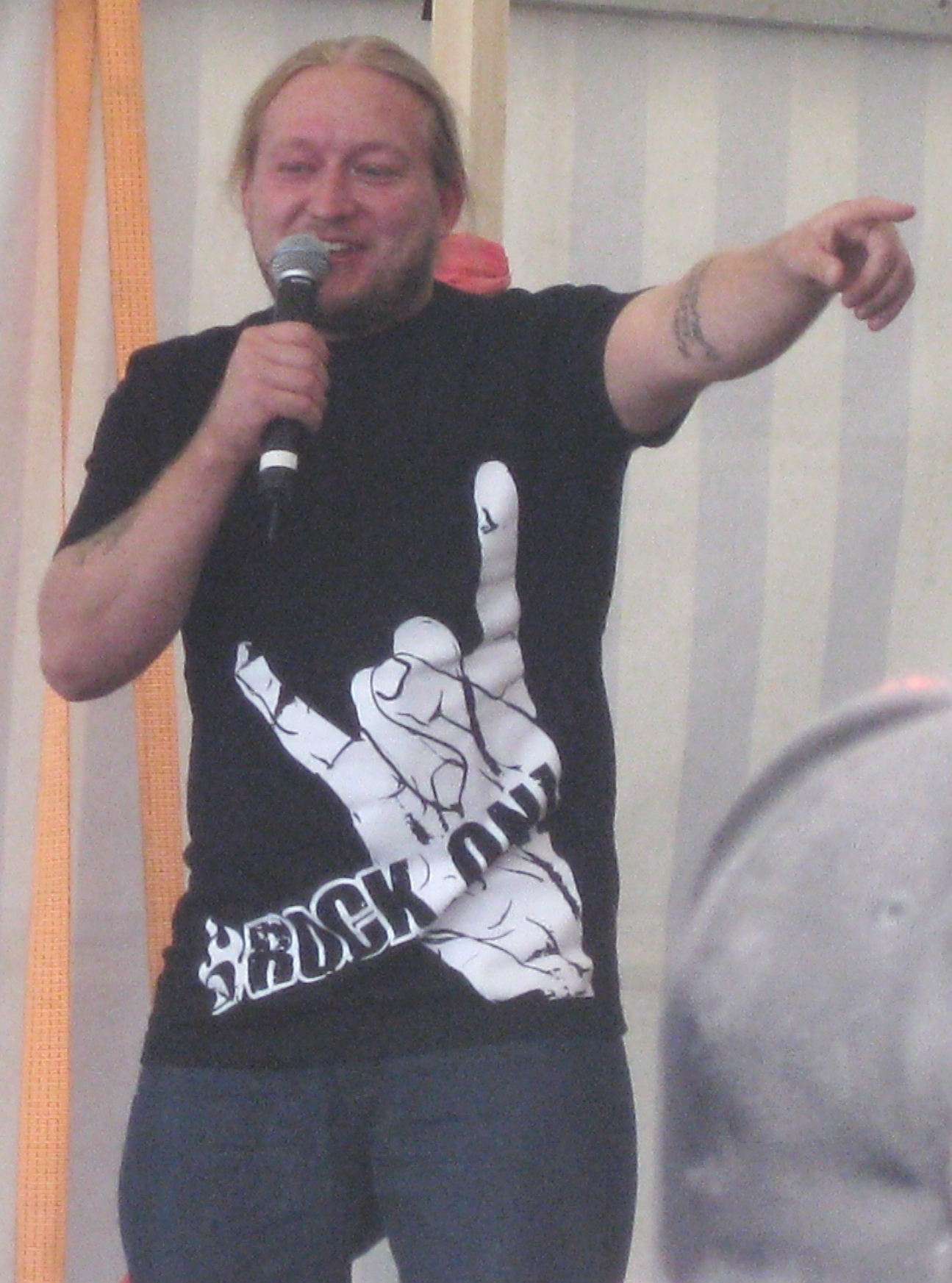
- Leppälä in 2010
- Born: Jarno Leppälä; 11 August 1979 (age 46); Seinäjoki, South Ostrobothnia, Finland
- Other names: Jarppi; Jarno2
- Occupations: Stunt performer, host
- Years active: 2001–present
- Known for: The Dudesons
- Height: 169 cm (5 ft 7 in)
- Spouse: Elina Karttunen
- Children: 2

Jarno "Jarppi" Leppälä (born 11 August 1979) is a Finnish television personality and a member of the stunt group the Dudesons.

== Biography ==
Leppälä was born in Seinäjoki, South Ostrobothnia. Around 2001, Leppälä (along with childhood friends Jarno Laasala, Jukka Hildén and HP Parviainen) began filming The Dudesons, originally seen on MoonTV. Shortly after, the Dudesons began touring and doing live performances. They have made several television shows and two feature films and also collaborated with Jackass, and Dirty Sanchez.

During his career Leppälä has also hosted television shows among other things. In 2011, Leppälä, partnered by Anna-Liisa Bergström, competed in the dance contest show Tanssii tähtien kanssa.

== Personal life ==
Leppälä has two sons (born 2010 and 2014) with his wife, singer Elina Karttunen.

== Filmography ==
=== TV ===
Year	Title	Role	Notes
2001–2003	Maailmankiertue	Himself	Finnish
2003–2004	Törkytorstai	Himself	Finnish
2004	Duudsoni Elämää	Himself	Finnish
2005	Viva La Bam	Himself	2 episodes
2006–2016	The Dudesons	Himself	Writer
2006	Jimmy Kimmel Live!	Himself	1 episode Guest appearance
2008	Piilokamerapäälliköt	Himself	Finnish
2008	Operaatio Maa	Himself	Finnish
2008	Los Premios MTV Latinoamérica 2008	Himself	Introduced Paramore
2010	Teräspallit	Himself	Finnish
2010	The Dudesons in America	Himself	Writer; Executive producer
2010	2010 MTV Europe Music Awards	Himself	Presenter
2011	Skavlan	Himself	1 episode Musical performer
2011	Tanssii tähtien kanssa	Himself	Finnish; Contestant; 10 episodes
2012–2018	Duudsonit tuli taloon	Himself	Finnish
2013	Loiter Squad	Himself	Episode 2.6
2014	Ridiculousness	Himself	Episode 4.13
2014-present	Posse	Himself	Finnish; Host
2019	Duudsonit Päällikkö	Himself	Finnish
2020-present	Kirppiksen kingi	Himself	Finnish
2021	Kioski	Myyjä esittely videolla	Finnish; 1 episode
2024	Top Gear Suomi	Himself	Finnish; 1 episode

=== Film ===
Year	Title	Role	Notes
2006	The Dudesons Movie	Himself	Writer; Additional camera
2008	Bam Margera Presents: Where the ♯$&% Is Santa?	Himself	Direct-to-video; Guest appearance
2009	Minghags	Himself	Direct-to-video
2010	Jackass 3D	Himself	Writer; Guest appearance
2011	Jackass 3.5	Himself	Writer; Guest appearance
2022	Jackass 4.5	Himself	Archive footage Uncredited
2026	Duudsonit-elokuva: Kotiinpaluu	Himself	Writer
