= Rabbit Films =

Finnish television and film production company

- Company type: TV production and distribution company
- Founded: 2000
- Founder: Jarno Laasala
- Headquarters: Helsinki, Finland
- Key people: Olli Suominen (CEO)
- Products: Television, distribution, motion pictures
- Parent: Monday Media
- Website: www.rabbitfilms.com

Oy Rabbit Films LTD is a Finnish TV production and distribution company founded by The Dudesons: Jarno Laasala, Jukka Hildén, Jarppi Leppälä and HP Parviainen.

As of 2017, it is one of the leading television production company in Finland. In the past years, Rabbit Films has produced 24 different prime-time shows for networks. In addition to its original formats, the company also makes local adaptions of international formats such as Saturday Night Live, Dragons' Den, Who Wants to Be a Millionaire, and The Lyrics Board.

Currently, the company is led by CEO Olli Suominen. Other executives and directors include Jaana Pasonen, Tuomas Summanen, Jasmine Patrakka, Suvi Valkonen, and Minna Haapkylä.

As of 2021, Rabbit Films is listed in 56 people's profiles on LinkedIn. It distributes its own formats and finished programs through its own distribution entity, Rabbit Formats.

In 2023, The majority of the company's shares were sold in June 2023 to the Danish film and television production company Monday Media.

== Productions ==
- King, live comedy on TV talent shows
- Posse, live TV show combining talk show and comedy
- Comedian and 7 Wonders, comedian conquers the world
- Celebrity Home Invasion
- Pop'n'Roll, music comedy panel
- Think Thank, twisted news comedy panel
- Ultimate Expedition, docureality where 8 celebrities are given a challenge to conquer a 20.000-foot-high mountain.
- Haggle Battle, bargain battle meets comedy panel show
- The Box, a live gaming show with YouTube superstars
- Should I Be Worried?, comedy panel show
- Once Upon a Life, family quiz meets panel show
- Battle of the Hits, music entertainment
- City vs Country, game show
- Over the Atlantic, adventure reality
- Globetrotters, adventure reality
- Queen of the Day, entertainment
- Don't You Know Who I Am, game show
- The Awards Show, entertainment
- conWEBsation, comedy panel show

== International distribution ==
- The Dudesons series, 5 season in over 150 countries
- Kill Arman, 2 seasons in over 80 countries
- Madventures, in over 150 countries
- Beyond Human Boundaries, 3 seasons

== YouTube channel ==
Rabbit Films co-owns the first Finnish YouTube network called Troot Network, and manages The Dudesons YouTube page with over 3 million subscribers.

== Awards ==
- Finnish TV Awards: The Dudesons 2010, Celebrity Home Invasion 2013, Posse 2014, Ultimate Expedition 2016, Who Wants to Be a Millionaire 2018
- European Pitch Competition: Celebrity Home Invasion
- Format of the Year Competition: Celebrity Home Invasion 2012, King 2015, Globetrotters 2018
