= I.aM.mE =

American hip-hop dance crew

- Origin: Houston, Texas, US
- Past members: Phillip "Pacman" Chbeeb; Di "Moon" Zhang; Brandon "747" Harrell; Emilio "Millie" Dosal; Džajna "Jaja" Vaňková; Tamara "Tam" Rapp (also from 8 Flavahz, season 7); Jean "B-Boy Bebo" Lloret (also from Phunk Phenomenon, season 6); Scarlett Nabil (also from Funkdation, season 7); Liza Riabinina; Olivia "Chachi" Gonzales
- Website: http://www.iammecrew.com/

I.aM.mE (which stands for inspire, motivate, and energize) is an American hip-hop dance crew from Houston, Texas. The group rose to prominence after being crowned champions in the sixth season of America's Best Dance Crew. The three founding members, Phillip Chbeeb, Di Moon Zhang and Brandon Harrell, formed I.aM.mE after Marvelous Motion Crew disbanded. Three additional members, Chachi Gonzales, Emilio Dosal, and Džajna "jaja" Vaňková, joined later after an audition.

The new and present roster of I.aM.mE includes members of dance crews who have competed in past seasons of ABDC, Tamara "Tam" Rapp (from 8 Flavahz, season 7), Jean "B-Boy Bebo" Lloret (from Phunk Phenomenon, season 6), Scarlett Nabil (from Funkdation, season 7), and sole newcomer to the show, Liza Riabinina.

== Before ABDC ==
Before coming together to form I.aM.mE, the members had all achieved considerable success by themselves. Di "Moon" Zhang posted many of his tutting videos onto YouTube before he met Phillip "Pacman" Chbeeb and created Marvelous Motion Crew, which also included Brandon "747" Harrell. As the main choreographers, they led the team to much success, winning first place at "The Show", a Dallas competition hosted by JabbaWockeeZ, the San Diego–based winners of ABDC's first season. Taking the crew to new levels, Marvelous Motion traveled to California on their first major competition, receiving third place at "World of Dance: Pomona" under the direction of Moon. However, the crew was unable to audition for the fourth and fifth seasons of ABDC, as Pacman was still under contract with the fifth season of So You Think You Can Dance. After the crew disbanded in late 2010, Pacman, Moon, and 747 held an audition, creating a brand new crew with three new members in preparation for ABDC: Season of the Superstars.

== ABDC Season 6 ==
I.aM.mE was declared the champions of ABDC: Season of the Superstars on June 5, 2011. They became the first mixed gender crew and also the first group from the South to win, ending the Western dominance of previous ABDC seasons.

Week	Challenge	Music	Result
1: Lil Wayne Challenge	None	"Right Above It"; Lil Wayne feat. Drake	Safe
3: The Black Eyed Peas Challenge	Must come together and create a machine	"Meet Me Halfway"; The Black Eyed Peas	Safe
4: Katy Perry Challenge	Fan out like a peacock	"Peacock"; Katy Perry	Safe
5: Rihanna Challenge	The Spiderman	"S&M"; Rihanna	Safe
6: Justin Bieber Challenge	Perform Usher's famous glide	"Somebody to Love"; Justin Bieber feat. Usher	Safe
7: Nicki Minaj Challenge	Incorporate childhood games into the routine	"Moment 4 Life"; Nicki Minaj feat. Drake	Safe
8: Kanye West Challenge	Demonstrate versatility by creating a routine that incorporated three different styles of dance.	Dougie: "Gold Digger"; Kanye West feat. Jamie Foxx; Boogaloo: "Touch the Sky"; Kanye West feat. Lupe Fiasco; Isolations: "Love Lockdown"; Kanye West	Bottom 2
8: Kanye West Challenge	Last chance to hook the voters using an original performance	"Ill-emental"	Safe
9: Battle of the Final Two	The judges chose which performance the crews would reproduce, but with modifications. The two crews were then pitted against each other in a three-round dance battle, with Swizz Beatz providing the music.	"S&M"; Rihanna; I.aM.mE vs. Iconic Boyz; Swizz Beatz	Safe
10: The Finale	Partner: ICONic Boyz	"Raise Your Glass"; Pink	Champions
10: The Finale	Perform for the last time before winner of ABDC's announcement	"Rocketeer"; Far East Movement feat. Ryan Tedder	Champions
10: The Finale	Victory Dance after being announced season 6 ABDC winners	"Written in the Stars"; Tinie Tempah feat. Eric Turner	Champions

=== Weekly Summaries ===
==== Week 1: Lil Wayne Challenge ====
I.aM.mE kicked off the season, performing to a mastermix of Lil Wayne's "Right Above It". Their performances pleased the crowd, and garnered good comments from the judges. D-Trix called them "clever" and that they "took tutting to the next level": the crew added some Rubik's-cube shapes and brought something new to ABDC. Lil Mama liked how the crew showed illusions and visual effects but mixed it with solid dance choreography. JC Chasez liked their style and was entertained, but wanted the crew to expand and dance to other parts of stage, instead of just the center.

==== Week 3: Black Eyed Peas Challenge ====
Their challenge in the third week was to create a futuristic machine, while performing to a mastermix of the Black Eyed Peas' song "Meet Me Halfway". They achieved this three times in their routine, notably at the end, when the whole crew came together to form a robot. The judges were pleased, but JC still was not satisfied with how they used the stage, and asked them to spread out more. Lil Mama however, said that they were the most improved and D-Trix said they executed their challenge "greatly".

==== Week 4: Katy Perry Challenge ====
In the fourth week, they received the Katy Perry song "Peacock" with the challenge to fan out like a peacock onstage. Although some of the members had never seen a peacock, and they had difficulty using the whole stage, the crew performed admirably, crafting a routine which satisfied all three of the judges, D-Trix stating how their dancing was authentic and they covered the entire stage, and JC saying he was satisfied with their use of the entire stage.

==== Week 5: Rihanna Challenge ====
In the fifth week all the crews were given the challenge of incorporating the dance style known as Dance Hall, while performing to songs by the artist Rihanna. I.aM.mE. received the Rihanna song "S&M", and the dance move known as "The Spiderman". The crew performed a routine which met the challenge and highlighted member Olivia "Chachi" Gonzales as a major character. The judges called the routine "exceptional" and "absolutely brilliant".

==== Week 6: Justin Bieber Challenge ====
In week 6, all five remaining crews were given a challenge by Justin Bieber, based from his documentary movie, Never Say Never. I.aM.mE was given a challenge to perform Usher's famous glide in the routine to the mastermix of "Somebody to Love". The crew performed with a chilling opening, featured the moonwalk, and ended with Brandon "747" Harrell jumping down after gliding and giving a rose to Lil Mama while the rest of the crew made a big heart with their arms. Lil Mama was still surprised, but she liked how the routine worked. D-Trix said that he loved the performance, just like the last week and told the crew that they were brilliant entertainers. JC still commented on "How I.aM.mE worked the routine on the middle, again", but he liked how I.aM.mE made the opening cold and chilling.

==== Week 7: Nicki Minaj Challenge ====
All top four crews blasted the seventh week with a routine performed with Nicki Minaj's challenge, based on her alter-egos. Nicki Minaj, who delivered the challenge to the crews herself, gave I.aM.mE the challenge to incorporate childhood games based on Nicki's alter-ego, Cookie, into their dance. After working through cultural differences in childhood games, I.aM.mE decided to incorporate similar games that many people would know. Backstage, Phillip "Pacman" Chbeeb said that he was having dehydration before, during, and after the performance because of the hard-training routine and fatigue.

The performance featured many games, such as Limbo, Jump Rope, Whack-a-Mole, Swing Sets, Hopscotch, and Leapfrog. The routine ended as 747, Pacman, and Millie created a Swing Set, with Chachi as a "girl on a swing" held by Moon and Jaja before she jumped off. They received a wild reaction from the crowd. The judges also gave positive reactions. JC told the crew that they performed a risky routine, but cleanly finished it, although he disliked it when he saw I.aM.mE look around the stage and check positions with others. D-Trix claimed that he couldn't find any bad moments on the routine, and loved how much childhood games were involved in the routine. Lil Mama liked how the crew stepped up and loved how the crew had their own moments and identity in the competition.

Backstage after the performance, Jaja, Chachi, 747, and Millie talked about their success, that they made it to top three. Jaja's father had never expected that they could have made it to top five, but the crew proved that he was wrong.

==== Week 8: Kanye West Challenge and Last Chance Challenge ====
As three crews were still standing in the championships, I.aM.mE faced their first time in the bottom two and had to face off against Phunk Phenomenon for a spot in the finals: ICONic Boyz had proceeded to the finale already. The crews were given a task to perform with Kanye West's mastermixes and show their own versatility to perform three different classic dance styles. The challenge was handed out by fifth season's winner, Poreotix.

Before the performance videos, the crew revealed that they had no problems performing two out of the three different styles (Boogaloo and Isolations) and only had problems performing the Dougie. Moon said that he really wanted to have a good performance that week because he wanted his parents to come to the finale and watch him perform live for the first time. He also said that he loved the crew that he created and danced with, and he stated that he believed they could make it to the finale.

The crowd did give them a standing ovation and chanted, "I.aM.mE, I.aM.mE!", leaving the judges with no criticism. JC said that the crowd's response weren't wrong and they deserved it. He also told the crew that they were very intelligent and unique and that they created new pictures that were unexpected and exciting. D-Trix was left speechless and said that the crew had "brain-banged" him. He complimented the crew on performing as themselves and that the crew had just "murdered" the "Isos (Isolation)" part. Lil Mama agreed with both judges that I.aM.mE were inspiring as dancers with unique styles. She noted that whatever happened, they would be champions.

Phunk Phenomenon was spirited and had wowed the judges, but I.aM.mE rose to the top two to battle against ICONic Boyz for the title of America's Best Dance Crew. After the mid-show elimination, they then had to perform their Last Chance Challenge to ask viewers to keep voting them to be winner of ABDC. For their final performance before voting lines opened, the crew worked with District 78 to create their own performance. They created their own original songs, wardrobe, and performance, resulting in the "Ill-Emental" performance which showed each of the members' skills and talents, as represented by their own elements: Emilio as Earth, Chachi as Fire, Jaja as Electricity, 747 as Wind, Moon as Machine, and Pacman as Water. The performance ended with the crew creating with their bodies the I-M-E letters. They received a standing ovation from the audience and the judges.

==== Week 9: Battle of Final Two/The Ultimate Battle ====
I.aM.mE and ICONic Boyz, as the top two crews at the ninth week, were given the task to extend the choreography from one of their previous performances picked by judges and to perform it, before the ultimate battle that consisted of three rounds.

The crew performed to an extended performance of "S&M" and were praised by the judges. JC noted again that they were unique. Lil Mama was excited as Chachi turned back into Spider-Girl and showed a new way to "knock" her enemies. D-Trix said that the crew was getting better and better. At the end, both crews faced off in a three-round dance battle with music provided by Swizz Beatz. At the end both crews showed their own original sign: ICONic Boyz with the thumb and I.aM.mE with the letters I, M, and E.

==== Week 10: The Finale ====
The finale opened with I.aM.mE and ICONic Boyz performing in a dance collaboration to "Raise Your Glass" by Pink. After the performance, America's Best Dance Crew champions JabbaWockeeZ (from season 1), Super Cr3w (season 2), Quest Crew (season 3), We Are Heroes (season 4), and Poreotix (season 5) returned to the stage to perform for the season finale.

That same night, I.aM.mE performed a routine to "Rocketeer" by Far East Movement for one moment before the announcement. The performance featured some flips and examples of choreography that were already shown on past episodes, but largely featured popping. The performance ended with Emilio performing a backflip, Moon and 747 showing their thumbs, while the music ended with the audio "One small step for I.aM.mE, one giant leap for ABDC."

After 50 million votes were cast, I.aM.mE was declared as the winner of America's Best Dance Crew for season 6. The crew performed their victory dance to "Written in the Stars" by Tinie Tempah.

== ABDC Season 8 ==
I.aM.mE joined the competing teams for ABDC Season 8, America’s Best Dance Crew All-Stars: Road to the VMAs, in 2015. This season features the winners of past 7 seasons, except Poreotix, who won in season 5 and JabbaWockeeZ, who won season 1.

Both female members from I.aM.mE's appearance in season 6, Džajna "Jaja" Vaňková and Olivia "Chachi" Gonzales, did not participate in season 8. Jaja is under contract with So You Think You Can Dance for its 12th season, and Chachi decided to focus on her solo projects, thus missing I.aM.mE's rehearsals. This led to speculations that the I.aM.mE members decided to eject her from the group, as they also stopped tagging her in social media but still tagged Jaja.

I.aM.Me ended up in the Bottom 2 of episode 4, together with Quest Crew, who ultimately won the competition I.aM.mE finished in fourth place of Season 8.

== Appearances ==
=== Television ===
- Pacman has auditioned in seasons 3, 4 and 5 of So You Think You Can Dance. He got to perform in the finale of season 4 as a guest performer. After auditioning again in season 5, he made it to the finals, where he was eliminated in the Top 12 of the season. Emilio auditioned in season 10, and after making it into the finals, he withdrew due to an injury. He then auditioned for season 11 and made the Top 20, where he was eliminated in the Top 10 of the season. Jaja auditioned for season 11 and season 12, and made the latter's Top 4.
- Pacman later went on to choreograph for SYTYCD, choreographing Zack and Fik-Shun's routine in Season 11 and the Top 20 Street Routine with Christopher Scott in Season 12.
- Chachi was one of the backup dancers for the Tribute to Britney Spears in the 2011 MTV Video Music Awards.
- Emilio and 747 performed as backup dancers for LMFAO's performance of "Party Rock Anthem" and "Sexy and I Know It" on the American Music Awards 2011.
- I.aM.mE performed at MTV's NYE in NYC 2012. The crew danced to "Party Rock Anthem" by LMFAO, "We Found Love" by Rihanna, "Beautiful People" by Chris Brown, "Give Me Everything" by Ne-Yo and Pitbull, and "Till The World Ends" by Britney Spears.
- I.aM.mE performed in a Shake It Up episode on June 3, 2012.

=== Miscellaneous work ===
- They performed at hip-hop dance charity showcase, Ken-Ya Dance, in April 2012 with other notable crews like Instant Noodles.
- The crew taught workshops at the Urban Dance Camp in southern Germany in 2011 and 2012, and performed at the corresponding Urban Dance Showcase both years.
- They performed at the International Secret Agents 2011 in Seattle, San Francisco, and at the Los Angeles Festival. (Jaja did not perform with the crew in Seattle. Chachi and Moon did not perform with the crew in San Francisco. Pacman did not perform with the crew in Los Angeles.)
- They performed at the Kinematix I.aM. PHUNK'tion event at Northeastern University in Boston on November 4, 2011.
- They visited the Philippines in April 2012 for a series of events. They were judges for a local dance contest, Dance Off 2012: The Grand Finals, and they performed two mall shows as part of the Brain Bang Mall Show. Each member also taught workshops for the Brainstorm Workshop 2012. A meet and greet event also took place.
- They made a guest appearance on the ninth episode of The LXD: Rise of the Drifts.

=== Film ===
- Pacman made an appearance in the film Step Up 4.
- Pacman, Emilio and Jaja appeared in Step Up 5.
- Chachi took the lead role in the 2014 film The Legend of Dark Horse County, directed by Shawn Welling, creator of the AXI series on YouTube which they regularly star in.
- Chachi made an appearance in East Los High.

=== YouTube/music videos ===
- Pacman and Moon made a cameo for Nigahiga (Ryan Higa), a popular videomaker on YouTube.
- Each member of the crew stars in Welling Films' AXI (Avengers of eXtreme Illusions).
- Moon made an appearance in LMFAO's video for "Sorry for Party Rocking".
- Pacman and 747 made an appearance on D-Trix's video "20 Michael Jackson Moves".
- Pacman, Jaja, Moon, Millie and 747 made an appearance in Nigahiga's "Clenching My Booty" music video.
- Jaja made an appearance on D-Trix's "20 Twerks" video.
- Pacman appeared in the video for Ed Sheeran's hit song "Don't".
- Pacman appeared in Taylor Swift's music video for "Shake It Off".
- Chachi appeared in Meghan Trainor's "Lips Are Movin."
- Pacman (and sometimes Moon) makes lots of appearances in D-Trix's videos (theDOMINICshow) including "Now Add A Dancer" 1-4 and "How Dancers Do College."

Preceded by Poreotix	America's Best Dance Crew Champions; I.aM.mE	Succeeded by Elektrolytes
