= Chachi Gonzales =

American dancer and actress (born 1996)

Olivia "Chachi" Hildén
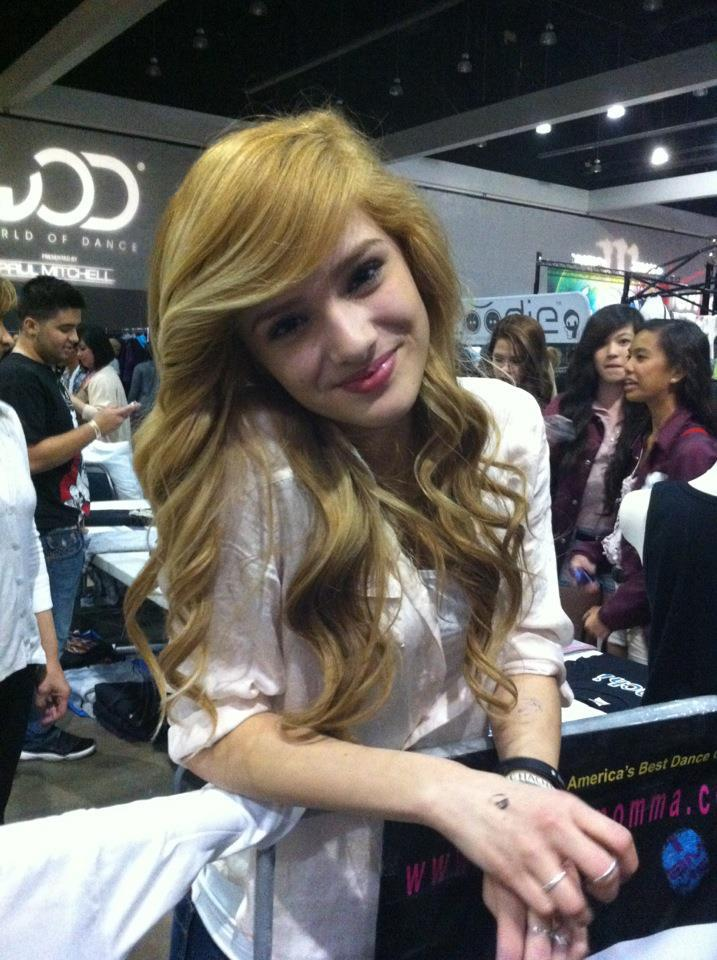
- Chachi Gonzales in 2012
- Born: Olivia Irene Gonzales; January 23, 1996 (age 30); Houston, Texas, U.S.
- Occupations: Dancer, choreographer, actress
- Years active: 2011–present
- Height: 5 ft 4 in (163 cm)
- Spouse: Jukka Hildén (m. 2019)
- Children: 3

Olivia "Chachi" Hildén (née Gonzales; born January 23, 1996) is an American dancer, choreographer, teacher and actress. She was a member of the dance crew I.aM.mE, which won the sixth season of America's Best Dance Crew in 2011.

== Personal life ==
Olivia Gonzales was born in Houston, Texas. She has an older sister.

In 2018, Gonzales began dating Finnish stunt performer and actor Jukka Hildén of the Dudesons, having met while filming the television series Ultimate Expedition. They got engaged in August 2018 and in May 2019 announced via Instagram and YouTube that Gonzales was pregnant. They married on September 28, 2019, in Lapland. On November 25, 2019, Gonzales gave birth to a baby girl and in April 2020, they moved from Los Angeles to Ähtäri, relocating to Helsinki in 2020.

== Career ==
Aged six, she was enrolled at a local dance studio and trained as a ballet dancer. Three years later at a dance event, she witnessed a hip hop dance crew for the first time, including Marvelous Motion, whose members (Phillip Chbeeb, Di Zhang and Brandon Harrell) would later become her fellow crew members in I.aM.mE. Gonzales enrolled at Lanier Middle School, where hip hop was taught and in 2010, after the disbandment of Marvelous Motion, auditions were held to create a new crew, I.aM.mE. Gonzalez auditioned successfully and became the crew's youngest member. Together they entered America's Best Dance Crew: Season of the Superstars.

=== Appearances ===
Gonzales was one of the backup dancers for the Tribute to Britney Spears as part of the 2011 MTV Video Music Awards. In 2012 she made a dance appearance with I.aM.mE in the Disney TV programme, Shake It Up. In 2013, she choreographed the dance to the second theme song of the fashion doll franchise Monster High, in "We Are Monster High". She took the lead role in the 2014 feature film The Legend of DarkHorse County, directed by Shawn Welling. Gonzales was in the cast of the second season of East Los High in 2014.

In May 2015, she judged the grand finals of the Jagthug World Dance Off competition, held at the Mall of Asia Arena in Manila.

=== Awards ===
In 2012, Gonzales was named "Teen Choreographer of the Year" at the World of Dance 2012 Industry Awards. She won the Remi Award for Best Supporting Actress for The Legend of DarkHorse County at the 2014 WorldFest-Houston International Film Festival awards. In 2015, she won the silver Remi Award for Original Comedy Short for the In the News episode "Dog Day" and for the AXI episode "Alive" for Best Dramatic Original Short Film.

=== Musical career ===
In 2022, Gonzales competed in Masked Singer Suomi, disguised as Party Animal. In January 2026, it was revealed that she would be competing in Uuden Musiikin Kilpailu for a chance to represent Finland in the Eurovision Song Contest, with her stage name as Chachi performing the song "Cherry Cake". She placed 4th with 99 points.

== Filmography ==
Television and film roles
Year	Title	Role	Notes
2012	Shake It Up	I.aM.mE dancer	Episode: "Wrestle It Up"
2012-2016	The AXI: Avengers of Xtreme Illusions	Zoe Croft/Mira Cruz/Lead Dancer	Recurring role
2014	The Legend of DarkHorse County	ChaChi Bishop	Film
2014	East Los High	Jasmine	Recurring role (seasons 2–3)
2015–2017	Chachi's World	Herself	Reality web series (go90)
2016	Make It Pop	Herself	Episode: "Summer Splash Spectacular"; as Olivia 'Chachi' Gonzales
2016	Freakish	Addy	4 episodes (season 1)
2016	Guidance	Brianna Wheeler	Web series (go90); main role (season 2)
2018	Ultimate Expedition	Herself	Reality web series; all episodes
2018	Light as a Feather	Noreen Listerman	Recurring role (season 1), 5 episodes
2019	Posse	Herself	Episode #6.10
2020	Yökylässä Maria Veitola	Herself	Episode #6.7
2022	Masked Singer Suomi	Herself	Character name Party Animal
2025-2026	Iholla	Herself	
2026	Duudsonit-elokuva: Kotiinpaluu	Herself	Film; Guest appearances
2026	Uuden Musiikin Kilpailu	Herself	Participant

Music videos
Year	Song	Artist	Notes
2012	"School Girl"	Adam Irigoyen	
2013	"Thank You"	Jason Chen	
2014	"Lips Are Movin"	Meghan Trainor	
2026	"Cherry Cake"	CHACHI	Her own song
