= Top Gear Suomi =

Finnish television series

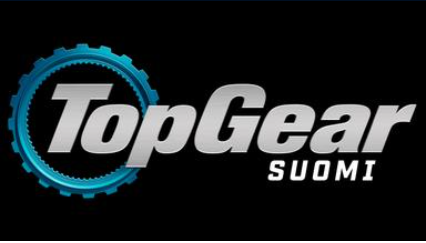
- Genre: Motoring; Entertainment
- Created by: BBC Worldwide
- Based on: Top Gear by BBC
- Written by: Matti Mikkonen
- Directed by: Matti Mikkonen
- Presented by: Teemu Selänne; Ismo Leikola; Christoffer Strandberg
- Starring: Stig
- Opening theme: "Jessica" by The Allman Brothers Band
- Country of origin: Finland
- Original language: Finnish
- No. of seasons: 2
- No. of episodes: 17

Production
- Production location: Helsinki Airport Studios
- Cinematography: Jussi Tapionlinna
- Editor: Janne Vianto
- Running time: Approx. 60 mins
- Production company: Rabbit Films

Original release
- Network: Nelonen; Ruutu
- Release: 24 February 2024 – 29 March 2026

Related
- Top Gear (franchise)

Top Gear Suomi is a Finnish motoring-based entertainment program, based on the original British program, which premiered in February 2024 on Nelonen network and Ruutu streaming service.

It is presented by Teemu Selänne, Ismo Leikola and Christoffer Strandberg, with "The Stig" featuring as the anonymous test driver.

== Production ==
=== Development ===
All the driving segments of the program were filmed from Spring to Summer 2023 around the country, and the studio recordings took place in December at Vantaa, near the airport with an audience. The first season is set to have nine episodes. The first Finnish season premiers in February 2024. The series is sponsored by Fixus, Korrek and Beely.

In December 2023, one of the hosts of the show, Ismo Leikola, revealed, that the host trio intended to make the show unique, and that they would not try to "copy" the characters of Clarkson, Hammond or May. Same time he revealed that the first season would include testing of many varying car models, from BMWs to Lamborghinis. Christoffer Strandberg revealed that he drove cars that cost up to €400,000, during the first season. For his first filming day of the show, Strandberg revealed that he almost crashed the Tesla S Model accidentally, when failing to brake early enough from the top speed of 277 km/h (172 mph), and almost drove into a dense bush at the end of the track.

=== Release ===
The first episode received a neutral viewership, averaging to 231,000 and reaching a bit over 400,000 viewers during its peak. It reached to the Top 5 highest ranking programs of the week for the channel Nelonen, which is respectful when comparing to the audience of the channel in question.

== Cast ==
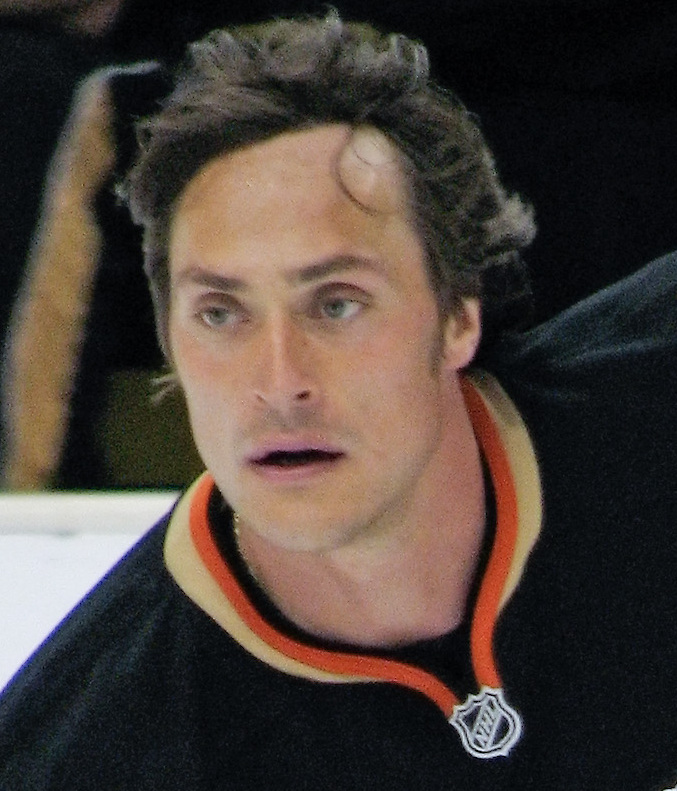
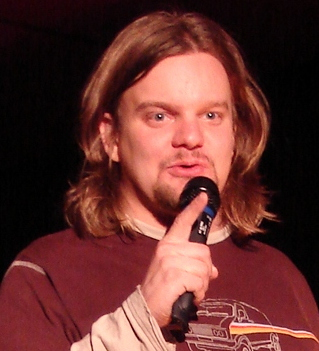
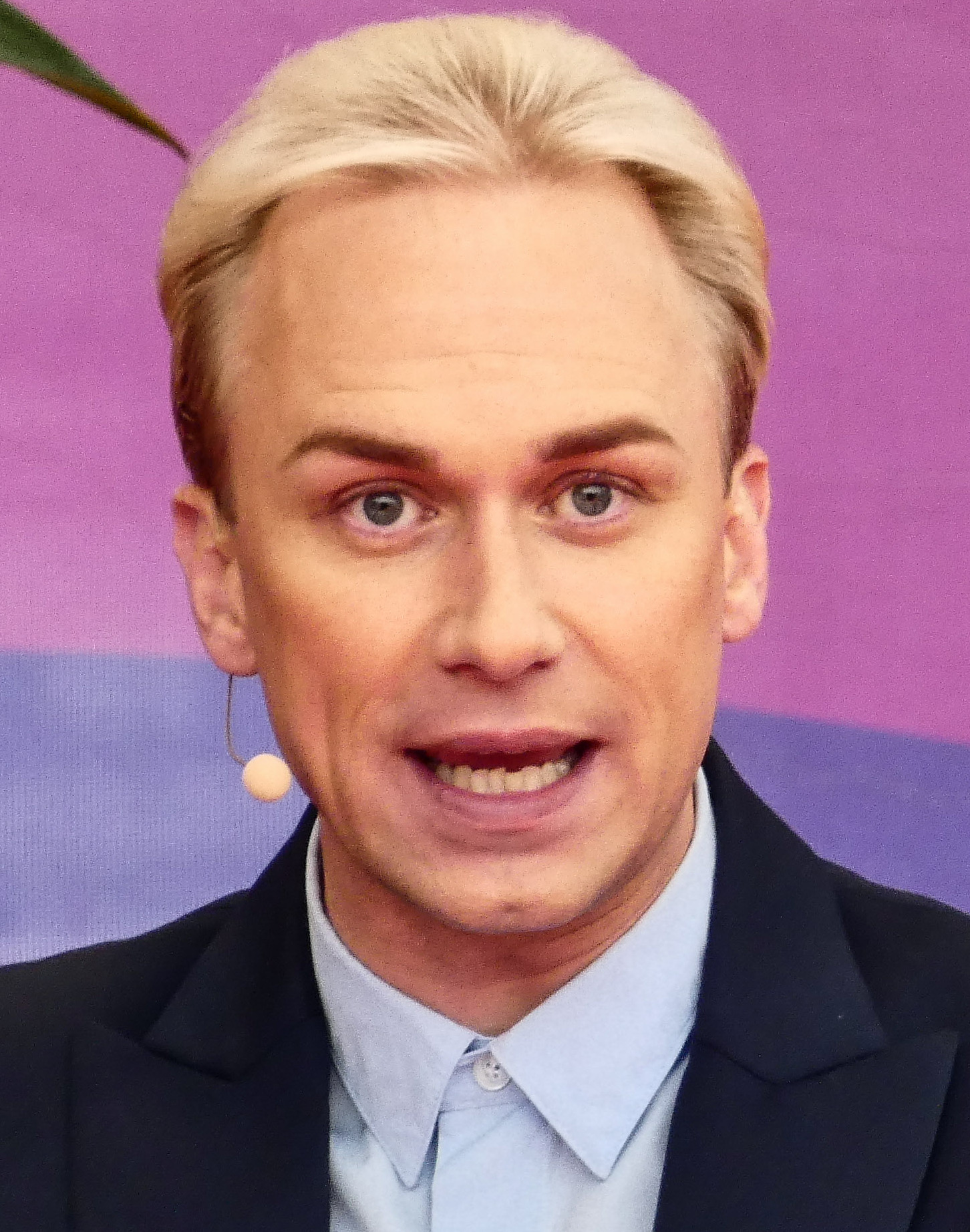
From left to right: Teemu Selänne, Ismo Leikola and Christoffer Strandberg
- Teemu Selänne, former Finnish elite ice hockey winger, Stanley Cup winner and World Championships medalist. Owns a car collection of 25 units.
- Ismo Leikola, Finnish stand-up comedian, World's Funniest Person 2014. Enjoys watching Finland's Rally at his home town Jyväskylä.
- Christoffer Strandberg, Swedish-speaking Finnish actor, imitator and television presenter. Likes the esthetic features in cars, and knows a lot of cars' names.
- Stig is the mysterious test driver of the show. He is left undisclosed within his white driving suit, and is ready to test some cars. Internationally known as "The Stig".

== Segments ==
=== Competitions ===
In the episodes, the presenters are given tasks they must complete. The best performed presenter wins a challenge. The competitions often may relate to racing to a given location. At the end of the season, the best driver is crowned.

=== Power Lap ===
In the Power Lap segment, each time a new car is introduced, it is being tested on the Finland's Top Gear test track by The Stig, who drives one lap around the track.

=== Celebrity Track Race Competition ===
Very much same as the Power Lap segment, but this time celebrity guests drive one lap, and compete for the fastest lap time of the season. The car they use is the Kia Rio.

The celebrity guests of the first season included Finnish football legend Jari Litmanen, rap-artist Gettomasa, singer Bess and presenter Jaana Pelkonen.

== Episodes ==
=== Season 1 (2024) ===
| No. overall | No. in series | Reviews | Features/challenges | Guest(s) | Original release date | Aver. viewers |
|---|---|---|---|---|---|---|
| 1 | 1 | Tesla Model S Plaid | Top Gear Suomi premieres: Teemu's tribute for the Corvette • Ismo challenges the Finnish Rally World Champions | Jari Litmanen | 24 February 2024 | 231,000 |
Teemu Selänne, Ismo Leikola, Christoffer Strandberg and The Stig kick off the historical episode of Top Gear Suomi. Everybody's passions and driving skills get tested right away in the first episode. Christoffer tests the new Tesla Model S Plaid for the first review to give it to The Stig. Teemu pays tribute to the seven great Chevrolet Corvettes from C1 to C7, and Ismo faces surprise guests on the track in the form of some previous Rally World Champions in a folkrace competition. Football legend Jari Litmanen gets behind the wheel of Kia Rio for the first ever celebrity lap round.
| 2 | 2 | None | The Best Teen Vehicle: (Toyota Corolla DX • BMW E46 • Ford Sierra) | Gettomasa | 2 March 2024 | 153,000 |
The presenters get to find out about which of their cars is the best teenage car of all time, as they compete against each other in a series of classical teenage car challenges with Corolla DX, driven by Christoffer, BMW E46, driven by Ismo and Ford Sierra, driven by Teemu. Jumping behind the wheel of the Kia Rio for the lap round this time is rapper Gettomasa.
| 3 | 3 | Polestar 2 | Taking the SUVs to the woods: (Dacia Duster • Nissan Qashqai • Land Rover Defender) | Bess | 9 March 2024 | 198,000 |
The presenters take three SUVs to the place they definitely do not belong; the woods, and test which of them has the best pulling power and endurance. Ismo drives the Dacia Duster, Teemu takes the Nissan Qashqai and Christoffer uses the Land Rover Defender. Christoffer test drives the Volvo's Polestar 2 and hands it to The Stig for the Power Lap, and singer Bess races in the track race competition.
| 4 | 4 | Porsche Taycan Turbo S | Christoffer & Ismo's trip to the foundation of Finnish car industry • Chritoffer & Teemu flip family's second cars into profit | Jaana Pelkonen | 17 March 2024 | 193,000 |
Christoffer & Ismo's pilgrimage to the foundation of the Finnish car industry leads to Uusikaupunki. The second task leads the presenters to a challenge of selling their families' second cars. Christoffer showcases the Porsche Taycan Turbo S and Stig puts it to the test in Power Lap. Guest for the episode is presenter and ex-politician Jaana Pelkonen.
| 5 | 5 | None | Gig driver challenges: (Mitsubishi Pajero • Ford Transit • Mercedes Benz S-Class) | Sami Hedberg | 23 March 2024 | 177,000 |
The presenters have a task to find out what is the best car for a random gig driver: Mitsubishi Pajero, Ford Transit or the Mercedes S-Class. They face multiple challenges on the test track, and head to Tallinn, Estonia, with a boat, where they had to pick up some suspicious stuff. Stand-up comedian Sami Hedberg competes on the lap round.
| 6 | 6 | Chevrolet Corvette C8 | Testing three luxury cars: (Lamborghini • McLaren • Ferrari) | Pikku G & Tuuli | 30 March 2024 | 157,000 |
The presenters test the world's most infamous supercars: Lamborghini, McLaren and Ferrari. Corvette C8 is in the showcase and Teemu is joined by four Finnish celebrities in his own segment to test a sports car. Studio guests include rapper Henri Vähäkainu aka Pikku G and singer Tuuli, who gets to complete for the fastest lap round.
| 7 | 7 | None | Finding out about how much gasoline is consumed in couple hours • Driving through the capital city as quick as possible | Mira Potkonen | 6 April 2024 | 163,000 |
Ismo, Teemu and Christoffer find out, how much gasoline you can consume in a couple of hours, how fast you can drive through Helsinki unrestrainedly, and is the future of Rally in the electric gasoline. Guest is ex-lightweight boxer Mira Potkonen.
| 8 | 8 | TBA | The Best Decade of Cars: (Toyota Supra MK4 • Ferrari Testarossa • Dodge Charger) • Teemu's BBQ Party | Jarppi Leppälä | TBA | TBD |
Teemu and Christoffer have a BBQ party with surprise celebrity guests. The presenters head onto the road, to find out what is the best decade of cars; is it the 1970s, the 1980s or the 1990s. Guest is Dudeson's Jarppi Leppälä.
| 9 | 9 | None | Teemu's Caravan trip | None | TBA | TBD |
In the final episode of the season, Teemu gets his presenting colleagues on the road, spending a nice caravan trip through the beautiful finnish summer landscape.

=== Season 2 (2025) ===
| No. overall | No. in series | Reviews | Features/challenges | Guest(s) | Original release date | Aver. viewers |
|---|---|---|---|---|---|---|
| 10 | 1 | Audi RS e-tron GT | Teemu, Ismo and Christoffer compete in pickup truck challenges • Ismo challenges Ferrari with Buick Riviera • Tribute to Heikki Silvennoinen | Heikki Silvennoinen | 15 March 2025 | N/A |
Teemu Selänne, Ismo Leikola, Christoffer Strandberg and The Stig are back for second season of Top Gear Suomi. First off the presenters face different challenges relating to their pickup trucks of their own choice. Christoffer reviews the Audi RS e-tron GT and hands it to The Stig for the lap around the race track. The episode is dedicated for the memory of the guest Kummeli-legend Heikki Silvennoinen, who passed away day after the studio recording of his episode.

== Critical reception ==
Albeit the Finnish television consumers approached carefully towards the decision of making Finland's own version of Top Gear, and that it would be most likely a failed copy, many were positively surprised on the premiere night.

Finnish newspaper Ilta-Sanomat has written, that many fans were happy with how original the presenters are from the British presenters, and how the format just works. The segments of the first episode were overall praised, and while some said that the presenters were a bit "weak" or "cold", the first program still managed to capture the atmosphere of the original Top Gear, yet it did not feel to be any kind of forced copy of it. A writer of Seiska commentated the succession of the format in Finland to neutral. The "cheap budget" could be sometimes seen in the program's flow, but the presenters are not great nor rubbish either, and each segment was at least watchable, but maybe not that memorable.

Before the start of the program, many Finnish media platforms reported that one of the presenters, Teemu Selänne, had criticized the age difference and sexual orientation between one of the Presidential candidates, Pekka Haavisto and his partner Antonio Flores. This raised a big uproar in the media, and many TV consumers were not sure about that, would it be right to show a program on the prime time, where Selänne would appear.
