= America's Best Dance Crew season 6 =

America's Best Dance Crew
- Season 6
- Hosted by: Mario Lopez
- Judges: JC Chasez; Lil Mama; D-Trix
- Winner: I.aM.mE

Release
- Original network: MTV
- Original release: April 7 – June 5, 2011

Season chronology
- ← Previous; Season 5 Next → Season 7

The sixth season of America's Best Dance Crew, also known as America's Best Dance Crew: Season of the Superstars, premiered on April 7, 2011. Taking a different route from past seasons, the crews performed to the music of one specific artist each week, including Rihanna, Lil Wayne, and other stars. The season also featured special guest appearances by various music celebrities including Justin Bieber, The Black Eyed Peas, Katy Perry, Kesha, Nicki Minaj, and Kanye West. Dominic "D-Trix" Sandoval, a former member of Quest Crew, joined returning judges Lil Mama and JC Chasez as the newest judge. In the season finale, which aired on June 5, 2011, I.aM.mE was declared the winner.

== Cast ==
For the sixth season of America's Best Dance Crew, auditions were held in four cities: Chicago, Houston, New York City, and Los Angeles.

Dance Crew	Hometown	Region
787 Crew	San Juan, Puerto Rico	Caribbean
Eclectic Gentlemen	North Hollywood, California	West
FootworKINGz	Chicago, Illinois	Midwest
I.aM.mE	Houston, Texas	South
ICONic Boyz	Englishtown, New Jersey	East
Instant Noodles	Orange County, California	West
Jag6ed	Crenshaw, California	West
Phunk Phenomenon	Boston, Massachusetts	East
ReQuest Dance Crew	Auckland, New Zealand	Pacific
Street Kingdom	Los Angeles, California	West

== Results ==
Rank	Dance Crew	Episode									
Rank	Dance Crew	1	2	3	4	5	6	7	8	9^{1}	10
1	I.aM.mE	IN		IN	IN	IN	IN	IN	RISK	IN	WINNER
2	ICONic Boyz		IN	IN	IN	IN	IN	IN	IN	IN	RUNNER-UP
3	Phunk Phenomenon	IN		IN	IN	RISK	IN	RISK	OUT		
4	Street Kingdom	IN		IN	RISK	IN	RISK	OUT			
5	Instant Noodles		IN	IN	IN	IN	OUT				
6	787 Crew		IN	IN	IN	OUT					
7	ReQuest Dance Crew	IN		RISK	OUT						
8	FootworKINGz		IN	OUT							
10	Jag6ed		OUT								
10	Eclectic Gentlemen	OUT									

^Note 1: A non-elimination episode meant to showcase the two finalists.

Key
(WINNER) The dance crew won the competition and was crowned "America's Best Dance Crew".
(RUNNER-UP) The dance crew was the runner-up in the competition.
(IN) The dance crew was safe from elimination.
(RISK) The dance crew was at risk for elimination.
(OUT) The dance crew was eliminated from the competition.

== Episodes ==
=== Episode 1: Lil Wayne Challenge ===
- Original Airdate: April 7, 2011

The first five crews auditioned for a chance to move on in the competition during the season premiere, beginning with a group performance to "6 Foot 7 Foot" featuring Cory Gunz.

Dance Crew	Song
I.aM.mE	"Right Above It" feat. Drake
Phunk Phenomenon	"A Milli"
ReQuest Dance Crew	"Knockout" feat. Nicki Minaj
Eclectic Gentlemen	"Fireman"
Street Kingdom	"I Am Not a Human Being"

- Safe: Street Kingdom, Phunk Phenomenon, I.aM.mE, ReQuest Dance Crew
- Eliminated: Eclectic Gentlemen

=== Episode 2: Kesha Challenge ===
- Original Airdate: April 14, 2011

The next five crews performed to Kesha hits to compete for a chance to move on to the next round, starting with a dance number to "We R Who We R".

Dance Crew	Song
FootworKINGz	"Tik Tok"
787 Crew	"Blow"
ICONic Boyz	"Your Love Is My Drug"
Jag6ed	"Sleazy"
Instant Noodles	"Dirty Picture" feat. Taio Cruz

- Safe: FootworKINGz, ICONic Boyz, 787 Crew, Instant Noodles
- Eliminated: Jag6ed

=== Episode 3: The Black Eyed Peas Challenge ===
- Original Airdate: April 21, 2011

The Black Eyed Peas assigned each crew a different song and challenge to incorporate into their routines.

Dance Crew	Song	Challenge
ICONic Boyz	"Just Can't Get Enough"	All members must stay connected for part of the routine.
Phunk Phenomenon	"Don't Stop the Party"	Must include a "slo-mo" section in their routine.
I.aM.mE	"Meet Me Halfway"	Must come together and create a machine.
Street Kingdom	"Imma Be	Incorporate light sabers in their routine.
787 Crew	"Boom Boom Pow"	Create an illusion that they are teleporting.
Instant Noodles	"My Humps"	Create video game-like visuals on stage.
FootworKINGz	"I Gotta Feeling"	Create the illusion that someone is floating.
ReQuest Dance Crew	"The Time (Dirty Bit)"	Create the illusion that they are cloning.

- Safe: ICONic Boyz, Phunk Phenomenon, I.aM.mE, Street Kingdom, 787 Crew, Instant Noodles
- Bottom 2: FootworKINGz, ReQuest Dance Crew
- Eliminated: FootworKINGz

=== Episode 4: Katy Perry Challenge ===
- Original Airdate: April 28, 2011

Katy Perry handed out dance challenges to the seven remaining crews.

Dance Crew	Song	Challenge
Phunk Phenomenon	"Waking Up in Vegas"	Make a roulette wheel.
I.aM.mE	"Peacock"	Fan out like a peacock.
787 Crew	"Hot n Cold"	Make a roller coaster.
ICONic Boyz	"Teenage Dream"	Make a wall, then break it down.
Instant Noodles	"Firework"	Make a chain reaction and explode.
Street Kingdom	"E.T." feat. Kanye West	Make a space ship.
ReQuest Dance Crew	"California Gurls" feat. Snoop Dogg	Ride a wave.

- Safe: Phunk Phenomenon, I.aM.mE, 787 Crew, ICONic Boyz, Instant Noodles
- Bottom 2: Street Kingdom, ReQuest Dance Crew
- Eliminated: ReQuest Dance Crew

=== Episode 5: Rihanna Challenge ===
- Original Airdate: May 5, 2011

The six remaining crews choreographed routines inspired by Rihanna. Rihanna's choreographer, Tanisha Scott, gave each crew a dancehall move to be incorporated.

Dance Crew	Song	Challenge
Instant Noodles	"Hard" feat. Young Jeezy	The Head Top
ICONic Boyz	"Only Girl (In the World)"	Give It A Run
I.aM.mE	"S&M"	The Spiderman
Street Kingdom	"Rude Boy"	The Dutty Wine
Phunk Phenomenon	"Don't Stop the Music"	The Chaplin
787 Crew	"What's My Name?" feat. Drake	Gallis Step

- Safe: Instant Noodles, ICONic Boyz, I.aM.mE, Street Kingdom
- Bottom 2: 787 Crew, Phunk Phenomenon
- Eliminated: 787 Crew

=== Episode 6: Justin Bieber Challenge ===
- Original Airdate: May 12, 2011

Justin Bieber handed out dance challenges to the five remaining crews. All the challenges were based on moments from Bieber's documentary Never Say Never.

Dance Crew	Song	Challenge
ICONic Boyz	"Baby" feat. Ludacris	Incorporate basketball-inspired choreography.
I.aM.mE	"Somebody to Love" feat. Usher	Perform Usher's famous glide.
Phunk Phenomenon	"Eenie Meenie" feat. Sean Kingston	Include steppin' in the routine.
Instant Noodles	"Runaway Love" feat. Kanye West and Raekwon	Incorporate chairs in the routine.
Street Kingdom	"Never Say Never" feat. Jaden Smith	Incorporate martial arts and high kicks.

- Safe: ICONic Boyz, I.aM.mE, Phunk Phenomenon
- Bottom 2: Instant Noodles, Street Kingdom
- Eliminated: Instant Noodles

=== Episode 7: Nicki Minaj Challenge ===
- Original Airdate: May 19, 2011

The final four crews kicked off the show with a group number to "Massive Attack" featuring Sean Garrett. Then, Nicki Minaj dropped by and challenged the four remaining crews to choreograph routines inspired by one of her alter egos.

Dance Crew	Song	Challenge
I.aM.mE	"Moment 4 Life" feat. Drake	Incorporate childhood games in the routine.
ICONic Boyz	"Check It Out" feat. will.i.am	Create a marionette onstage.
Phunk Phenomenon	"My Chick Bad" by Ludacris	Incorporate belly dancing in their routine.
Street Kingdom	"Did It On'em"	Incorporate military drills in their routine.

- Safe: I.aM.mE, ICONic Boyz
- Bottom 2: Street Kingdom, Phunk Phenomenon
- Eliminated: Street Kingdom

=== Episode 8: Kanye West Challenge ===
- Original Airdate: May 26, 2011

The episode began with the three remaining crews performing a group number to "All of the Lights" featuring Rihanna. Season 5 winner Poreotix delivered the challenges to the crews. After the mid-show elimination, the final two crews performed their prepared routines to make their one last plea for votes.

==== Challenge #1 ====
The crews had to demonstrate their versatility by creating a routine that incorporated three different styles of dance. All crews were given the same styles and songs.

Song	Style
"Gold Digger" feat. Jamie Foxx	Dougie
"Touch the Sky" feat. Lupe Fiasco	Boogaloo
"Love Lockdown"	Isolations

- Safe: ICONic Boyz
- Bottom 2: Phunk Phenomenon, I.aM.mE
- Eliminated: Phunk Phenomenon

==== Challenge #2 ====
The two finalists were given one last chance to perform before the lines opened for the final voting session of the season.

Dance Crew	Performance Title
ICONic Boyz	The ICONic Dream
I.aM.mE	Ill-emental

=== Episode 9: Battle of the Final Two ===
- Original Airdate: June 2, 2011

The final two crews faced off in the penultimate episode of Season 6, which also featured a look back at their accomplishments so far.

==== Challenge #1 ====
For the first challenge, the judges chose one routine from the past weeks in which the crews must improve upon and perform again. The judges selected I.aM.mE's Week 5 Rihanna performance and ICONic Boyz' Week 6 Justin Bieber routine.

==== Challenge #2 ====
The two crews then performed in a three-round dance battle. Swizz Beatz returned to provide the music for the battle.

Round	Song
1	"Everyday (Coolin')" by Swizz Beatz feat. Eve
2	"On to the Next One" by Jay-Z feat. Swizz Beatz
3	"I Can Transform Ya" by Chris Brown feat. Swizz Beatz

=== Episode 10: Finale ===
- Original Airdate: June 5, 2011

The winner was crowned in the Season 6 finale, which also featured performances by the past winners. In contrast to previous seasons of America's Best Dance Crew, the finale was pre-recorded; each crew taped a faux winning and losing reaction, as well as their victory performance, and were unaware of the results until the final cut of the episode was aired prior to the 2011 MTV Movie Awards.

Dance Crew(s)	Song
I.aM.mE and ICONic Boyz	"Raise Your Glass" by Pink
Poreotix	"Friday" by Rebecca Black
We Are Heroes	"Run the World (Girls)" by Beyoncé
Quest Crew	"Party Rock Anthem" by LMFAO
Super CR3W	"Power" by Kanye West feat. Dwele
JabbaWockeeZ	"We Just Made It" and "Devastating Stereo" by The Bangerz
ICONic Boyz	"Yeah 3x" by Chris Brown
I.aM.mE	"Rocketeer" by Far East Movement feat. Ryan Tedder
I.aM.mE	"Written in the Stars" by Tinie Tempah feat. Eric Turner

- Winner: I.aM.mE
- Runner-Up: ICONic Boyz
