= Welling Films =

American film production company

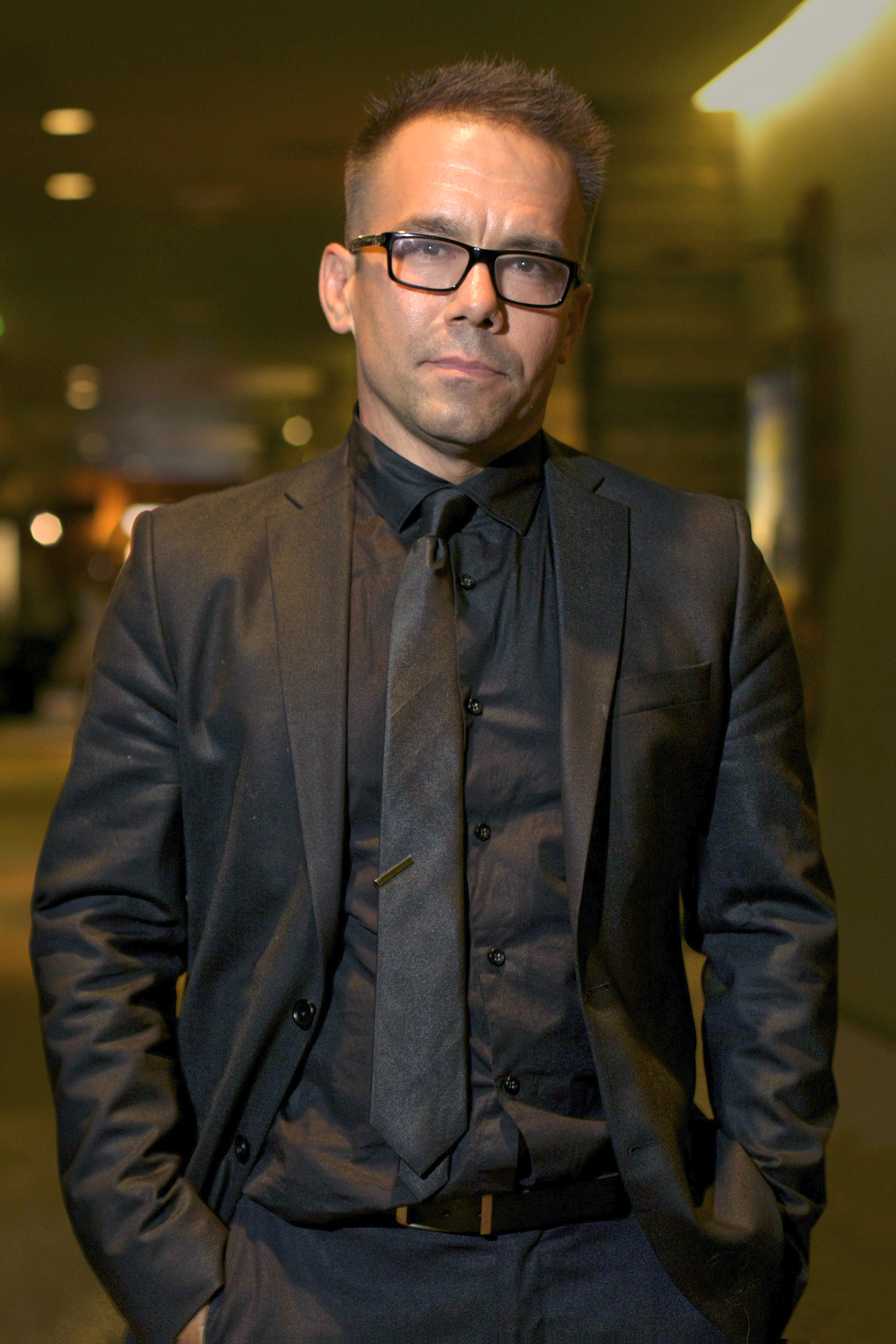
- Founder Shawn Welling
- Founded: April 1, 2006
- Founder: Shawn Sterling Welling

Welling Films (sometimes written as WF) is an American film production company and studio based in Houston, Texas. It was launched in mid-2006 by Houston-born choreographer and photographer Shawn Welling. They have produced five feature films, along with the web series AXI: Avengers of eXtreme Illusions, and several narrative and documentary short films.

== Company history ==
After Welling's dance studio was beset with Houston city council suits regarding its parking situation, he decided to document the battle on film. The studio released its first film, The House of Dreams, in 2006. This film would win Welling best director honours in 2006 and 2007 from WorldFest-Houston International Film Festival.

This win and Welling's eye as a cinematographer would foster a lasting partnership with film legend Lee Majors. In the subsequent years since the company's founding, he has appeared in six projects with the studio.

Their 2009 documentary film The Messenger: 360 Days of Bolivar, chronicled the life of four men living on the Bolivar Peninsula during the year leading up to the devastation of Hurricane Ike in the Galveston Bay Area. Among other accolades, it won the Houston Press award for best local film from the Houston area and sold out an impressive nine showings at the historic River Oaks Theatre. Additionally, city councilman and radio personality Michael Berry served as a producer on the movie, after having been an important figure in Welling's legal battle. Berry's fellow associate producer, Todd Spoth, relates a story from the film's winning weekend at Worldfest," when "An older lady pulled [him] aside following the initial screening to... express her liking for the work. She turned out to be in charge of the selection committee for the Sundance Film Festival and invited [the filmmakers] out to next year's festival."

In 2011, feature film Project Aether, earned Critics Choice Awards for 'Best Feature', 'Best Actor', and 'Best Overall World Premier' by the Houston Film Critics Society, as well as a Best Local Filmmaker Award from Houston Press, which described it as "a patchwork of the sci-fi, horror and conspiracy theory genres." That year, the Houston Press quoted Worldfest president Hunter Todd as saying that the competition was so fierce that if Spielberg were to enter his Remi-winning film to the competition that year, "it might not win, because shorts have gotten so good." Also in 2011, he began filming The Legend of DarkHorse County, a feature film starring Olivia "Chachi" Gonzales. The film began as an episode of AXI, but upon finding out Gonzales was strong enough as an actress, Welling decided to create the project as a feature film. The film also features actor Lee Majors, of television's The Big Valley and The Six Million Dollar Man fame. Late in the filming process, Welling added on film veteran Michael Biehn, of The Terminator, Aliens, and Tombstone. Following this project, Biehn asked Welling to be his Director of Photography for his next film.

In 2011, the studio also began the web series AXI: Avengers of Xtreme Illusions, featuring the I.aM.mE Dance crew in a series of web films in the vein of The Twilight Zone, but "infused with dance and lyrical movement that have never been seen before." The series is described as "Once Upon a Time" meets "The Twilight Zone" meets insanely good hip hop—with a Tim Burton-esque quality that's just creepy enough. Also in 2011, he began filming The Legend of DarkHorse County, a feature film starring Olivia "Chachi" Gonzales. The film began as an episode of AXI, but upon finding out Gonzales was strong enough as an actress, Welling decided to create the project as a feature film.

In 2015, Welling Films released five different short films, ranging from topics as diverse as zombie lore to canine aging. In that year, the studio also garnered twelve awards from film festivals in the United States and internationally.

In 2016, Welling Films partnered with Wolk Films to produce "Agnosia," a dramatic feature delving into the experience of aging and the triumph of the human spirit over adversity. He also made "The Blimp Trap," a dramatic short, featuring a strong disabled female character.

== Filmography ==
Release year	Film title
2006	The House of Dreams
2009	The Messenger: 360 Days of Bolivar
2011	Project Aether
2013	The Walk
2014	The Legend of DarkHorse County
2014	Adamo
2014	The Gift
2015	Toxin: 700 Days Left on Earth
2015	Beyond the Yellow Brick Road
2015	If I Could Talk
2015	The Mechanic
2016	The Blimp Trap
2016	Agnosia
2016	Love for all Seasons
2016	The Clean-Up Men

== Distribution ==
Welling Films productions are typically distributed through the company's monetized YouTube channel. Feature films are not released online, but have screenings at AMC Theatres and Sundance Cinemas. Select premieres have also taken place at the historic River Oaks Theatre.

== Films ==
The studio has produced both narrative and documentary films. They have prominently used kickstarter and indiegogo to promote the adaptation of short films into features.

== Web series ==
Welling Films' most successful project to date has been Avengers of eXtreme Illusions (AXI) series, which has garnered over 18 million views on YouTube as of February 2016. In 2014, they launched a companion web series, In the News, featuring series creator Shawn Welling and dancing stars Phillip Chbeeb and Chachi Gonzales.
