= Jarno Laasala =

Finnish filmmaker and stunt performer (born 1979)

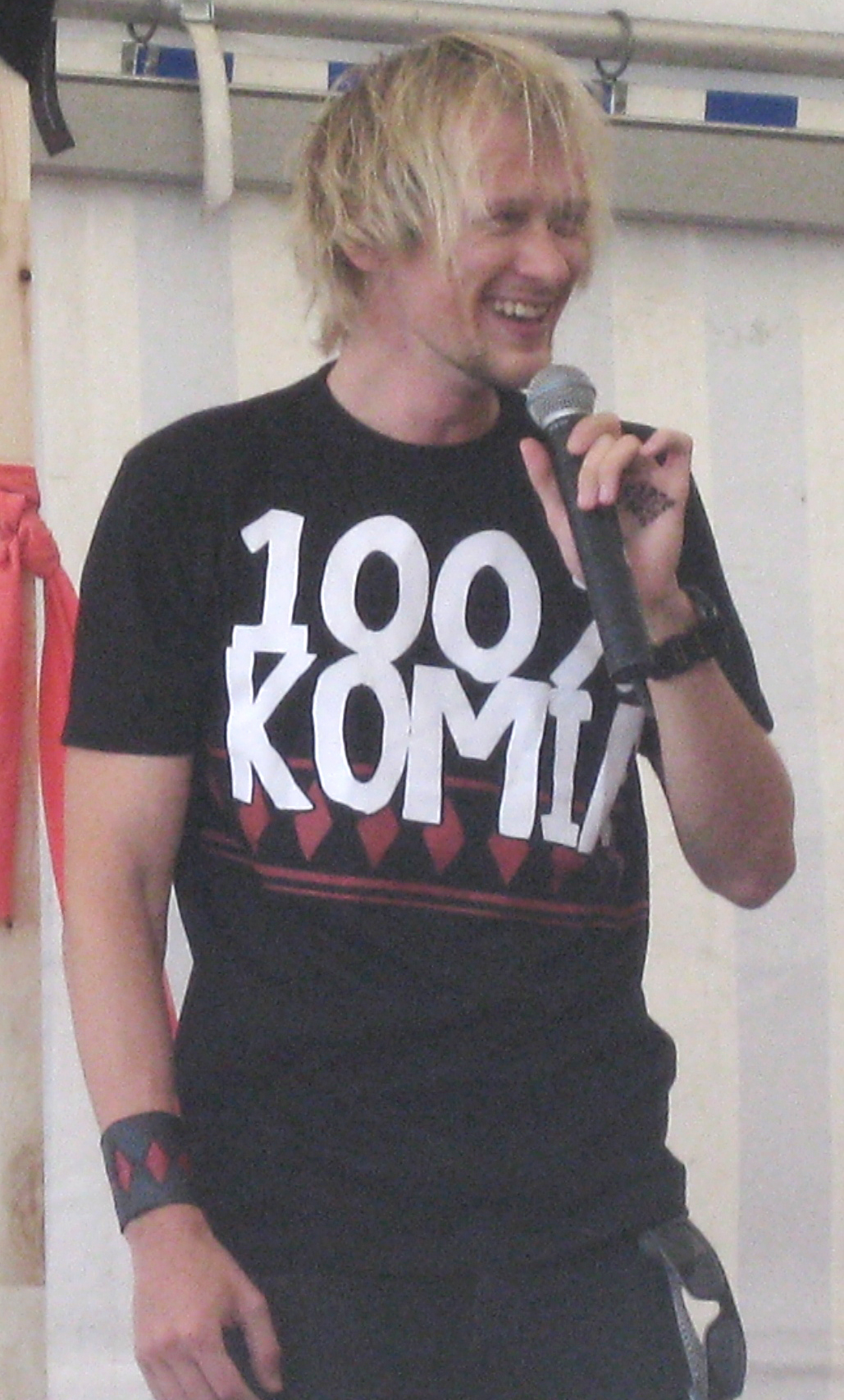
- Laasala in 2010
- Born: Jarno Laasala; 19 September 1979 (age 46); Seinäjoki, South Ostrobothnia, Finland
- Occupations: Filmmaker, stunt performer
- Years active: 2001–present
- Known for: The Dudesons
- Height: 181 cm (5 ft 11 in)
- Spouse: Hanne Maria Savunen (m. 2010; div. 2020)
- Children: 3

Jarno Laasala (born 19 September 1979) is a Finnish filmmaker and stunt performer. He is a member and co-founder of the stunt group the Dudesons and the former CEO of the production company Rabbit Films.

As a child, Laasala was a Super Mario Bros. (Nintendo) champion in Finland.

== Personal life ==
Laasala has three children with his ex-wife, Hanne Maria Laasala (Savunen). In 2017, Laasala was diagnosed with melanoma, which has since been cured.

== Filmography ==
=== TV ===
| Year | Title | Role | Notes |
|---|---|---|---|
| 2001-2003 | Maailmankiertue | Himself | Finnish |
| 2003 | Viva La Bam | Himself | Cameo; 1 episode |
| 2004 | Duudsoni Elämää | Himself | Finnish |
| 2006–2016 | The Dudesons | Himself | Co-creator; Director; Cinematographer; Executive producer Writer |
| 2006 | Jimmy Kimmel Live! | Himself | 1 episode Guest appearance |
| 2008 | Piilokamerapäälliköt | Himself | Finnish |
| 2008 | Los Premios MTV Latinoamérica 2008 | Himself | Introduced Paramore |
| 2010 | The Dudesons in America | Himself | Co-creator; Executive producer Writer |
| 2010 | 2010 MTV Europe Music Awards | Himself | Presenter |
| 2011 | Skavlan | Himself | 1 episode Musical performer |
| 2013 | Loiter Squad | Himself | 1 episode Guest appearance |
| 2013–2018 | Duudsonit: Tuli Taloon | Himself | 36 episodes Finnish; Executive producer Cinematographer |
| 2014–2022 | Posse | Himself | Finnish |
| 2019 | Duudsonit Päällikkö | Himself | Finnish; Host |
| 2024 | Top Gear Suomi | Himself | Finnish; 1 episode |

=== Film ===
| Year | Title | Role | Notes |
|---|---|---|---|
| 2006 | The Dudesons Movie | Himself | Director; Producer; Editor; Writer |
| 2010 | Jackass 3D | Himself | Writer; Guest appearance |
| 2011 | Jackass 3.5 | Himself | Writer; Guest appearance |
| 2026 | Duudsonit-elokuva: Kotiinpaluu | Himself | Director; Writer; Executive producer |
