= America's Best Dance Crew season 5 =

America's Best Dance Crew
- Season 5
- Hosted by: Mario Lopez
- Judges: JC Chasez; Lil Mama; Omarion
- Winner: Poreotix

Release
- Original network: MTV
- Original release: January 28 – April 15, 2010

Season chronology
- ← Previous; Season 4 Next → Season 6

The fifth season of America's Best Dance Crew premiered on January 28, 2010. Similar to the live casting specials featured in the first two seasons, the first three episodes consisted of separate regional auditions before proceeding to the official national-level competition. Judges Lil Mama and JC Chasez, host Mario Lopez, and backstage correspondent Layla Kayleigh all returned; Shane Sparks did not return as a judge (due to his arrest) and was replaced by Omarion. In the live finale, which aired on April 8, 2010, Poreotix was declared the ultimate winner.

== Cast ==
For the fifth season of America's Best Dance Crew, auditions were held in six cities: Atlanta, Houston, Denver, Los Angeles, Boston, and New York City. Fifteen dance crews were selected and then categorized into three regions: South, East Coast, and West Coast. Following the regional competitions, the initial pool of dance crews was narrowed down to nine.

Dance Crew	Hometown	Region
Blended Projekt	West Covina, California	West
Blueprint Cru	Montreal, Canada	East
BreakEFX	Denver, Colorado	West
draZtik	Providence, Rhode Island	East
Ghost	Houston, Texas	South
Heavy Impact	Los Angeles, California	West
Hype 5-0	Honolulu, Hawaii	West
Jungle Boogie	Stone Mountain, Georgia	South
Legendary Seven	Boston, Massachusetts	East
Poreotix	Westminster, California	West
Royal Flush	Atlanta, Georgia	South
Saltare	Raleigh, North Carolina	East
Static Noyze	Cambridge, Massachusetts	East
Swagger Crew	Atlanta, Georgia	South
X-treme Motion	Houston, Texas	South

== Results ==
Rank	Dance Crew	Episodes										
Rank	Dance Crew	1	2	3	4	5	6^{1}	7^{2}	8	9	10	11
1	Poreotix			SAFE	SAFE	SAFE	SAFE	SAFE	SAFE	SAFE	RISK	WINNER
2	Blueprint Cru		SAFE		SAFE	RISK	SAFE	IMMU	RISK	RISK	SAFE	RUNNER-UP
3	Hype 5-0			RISK	RISK	SAFE	SAFE	SAFE	SAFE	SAFE	ELIM	
4	Jungle Boogie	SAFE			SAFE	SAFE	SAFE	RISK	SAFE	ELIM		
5	Saltare		SAFE		SAFE	SAFE	SAFE	SAFE	ELIM			
7	Heavy Impact			SAFE	SAFE	SAFE	SAFE	ELIM				
7	Static Noyze		RISK		RISK	SAFE	SAFE	ELIM				
8	Royal Flush	RISK			SAFE	ELIM						
9	Swagger Crew	SAFE			ELIM							
—N/a	Blended Projekt			ELIM								
—N/a	BreakEFX			ELIM								
—N/a	draZtik		ELIM									
—N/a	Legendary Seven		ELIM									
—N/a	Ghost	ELIM										
—N/a	X-treme Motion	ELIM										

^Note 1: No crews were eliminated due to technical errors in voting.
^Note 2: Blueprint Cru received immunity from the double-elimination for having the judges' favorite performance during the previous episode.

Key
(WINNER) The dance crew won the competition and was crowned "America's Best Dance Crew".
(RUNNER-UP) The dance crew was the runner-up in the competition.
(SAFE) The dance crew was safe from elimination.
(IMMU) The dance crew was immune from elimination.
(RISK) The dance crew was at risk for elimination.
(ELIM) The dance crew was eliminated from the competition.
(ELIM) The dance crew did not advance to the competition and was eliminated from the regional finals.

== Episodes ==
=== Episode 1: ABDC Regional Finals: The South ===
- Original Airdate: January 28, 2010

The five top dance crews from the South, selected by Lil Mama, JC Chasez, and guest judge Hokuto Konishi from Quest Crew, competed to represent their region in the Season 5 opener. After the Bottom 3 was chosen, each crew had to face off in a dance battle to "Outta Control" by Baby Bash featuring Pitbull.

Dance Crew	Song
Jungle Boogie	"Bounce" by Busta Rhymes
Ghost	"Android Porn" by Kraddy
X-treme Motion	"She Ain't Got..." by LeToya Luckett
Swagger Crew	"Ice Cream Paint Job" by Dorrough
Royal Flush	"Wasted" by Gucci Mane feat. Plies

- Safe: Swagger Crew, Jungle Boogie
- Bottom 3: X-treme Motion, Royal Flush, Ghost
- Eliminated: Ghost, X-treme Motion

=== Episode 2: ABDC Regional Finals: The East ===
- Original Airdate: February 4, 2010

The five top dance crews from the East Coast, selected by Lil Mama and guest judge Kevin "KB" Brewer from the JabbaWockeeZ, auditioned for a chance to move on in the competition. After the Bottom 3 was chosen, the crews participated in a dance battle to "Hip Hop Is Dead" by Nas featuring will.i.am.

Dance Crew	Song
Legendary Seven	"I Can Transform Ya" by Chris Brown feat. Lil Wayne and Swizz Beatz
draZtik	"Shattered Glass" by Britney Spears
Blueprint Cru	"Feel On It" by Bishop Lamont
Static Noyze	"On to the Next One" by Jay-Z feat. Swizz Beatz
Saltare	"I'mma Shine" by YoungBloodZ

- Safe: Saltare, Blueprint Cru
- Bottom 3: draZtik, Legendary Seven, Static Noyze
- Eliminated: Legendary Seven, draZtik

=== Episode 3: ABDC Regional Finals: The West ===
- Original Airdate: February 11, 2010

The five top dance crews from the West Coast, selected by JC Chasez, Omarion, and guest judge Nichelle Thrower from We Are Heroes, performed for the opportunity to win a spot on the show. After the Bottom 3 was chosen, the crews battled each other to "Showdown" by The Black Eyed Peas.

Dance Crew	Song
Hype 5-0	"Drop It Low" by Ester Dean feat. Chris Brown
Heavy Impact	"Raindrops" by Jeremih
Blended Projekt	"Get Involved" by Ginuwine feat. Missy Elliott and Timbaland
BreakEFX	"All Eyes on Me" by Clipse feat. Keri Hilson
Poreotix	"Love Story" by Taylor Swift

- Safe: Poreotix, Heavy Impact
- Bottom 3: Blended Projekt, Hype 5-0, BreakEFX
- Eliminated: Blended Projekt, BreakEFX

=== Episode 4: Chart Topper Challenge ===
- Original Airdate: February 18, 2010

Each crew was assigned a hit song that served as inspiration for their dance routines. The lowest ranked crew in each region danced in a battle for 30 seconds each to "TiK ToK" by Ke$ha.

Dance Crew	Song
Hype 5-0	"Imma Be" by The Black Eyed Peas
Heavy Impact	"Say Aah" by Trey Songz feat. Fabolous
Poreotix	"Day 'n' Nite" by Kid Cudi
Swagger Crew	"Hard" by Rihanna feat. Young Jeezy
Jungle Boogie	"How Low" by Ludacris feat. Shawnna
Royal Flush	"Down" by Jay Sean feat. Lil Wayne
Saltare	"Hotel Room Service" by Pitbull
Static Noyze	"Whatcha Say" by Jason Derülo
Blueprint Cru	"That's Not My Name" by The Ting Tings

- Safe: Poreotix, Heavy Impact, Jungle Boogie, Royal Flush, Blueprint Cru, Saltare
- Bottom 3: Hype 5-0, Swagger Crew, Static Noyze
- Eliminated: Swagger Crew

=== Episode 5: Music Video Challenge ===
- Original Airdate: February 25, 2010

The eight remaining crews emulated popular music videos from the past decade, featuring videos from artists such as Britney Spears, Shakira, Rihanna, and Omarion.

Dance Crew	Song
Poreotix	"Umbrella" by Rihanna feat. Jay-Z
Jungle Boogie	"Give It Up to Me" by Shakira feat. Lil Wayne
Static Noyze	"New in Town" by Little Boots
Saltare	"Shake It" by Metro Station
Heavy Impact	"What You Got" by Colby O'Donis
Hype 5-0	"3" by Britney Spears
Royal Flush	"Evacuate the Dancefloor" by Cascada feat. Carlprit
Blueprint Cru	"I Get It In" by Omarion feat. Gucci Mane

- Safe: Poreotix, Jungle Boogie, Static Noyze, Saltare, Heavy Impact, Hype 5-0
- Bottom 2: Royal Flush, Blueprint Cru
- Eliminated: Royal Flush

=== Episode 6: Lady Gaga Challenge ===
- Original Airdate: March 4, 2010

The seven remaining crews choreographed routines inspired by Lady Gaga. There were no eliminations due to voting issues. At the end of the episode, the judges chose the crew with the best performance to receive immunity from the double-elimination next week.

Dance Crew	Song
Static Noyze	"Beautiful, Dirty, Rich"
Blueprint Cru	"Bad Romance"
Jungle Boogie	"Video Phone" by Beyoncé
Heavy Impact	"LoveGame"
Hype 5-0	"Poker Face"
Poreotix	"Paparazzi"
Saltare	"Just Dance" feat. Colby O'Donis

- Safe: Static Noyze, Blueprint Cru, Jungle Boogie, Heavy Impact, Hype 5-0, Poreotix, Saltare
- Awarded Immunity: Blueprint Cru

=== Episode 7: Disco Challenge ===
- Original Airdate: March 11, 2010

The seven remaining crews incorporated classic disco moves into their dance routines. In addition to the challenge, all the crews had to incorporate a lift into their routines. This week featured a double-elimination due to last week's non-elimination episode.

Dance Crew	Song	Challenge
Blueprint Cru	"Le Freak" by Chic	Funky guitar
Saltare	"Disco Inferno" by The Trammps	Hustle
Poreotix	"Dancing Machine" by The Jackson 5	Robot
Hype 5-0	"Shake Your Groove Thing" by Peaches & Herb	Electric slide
Heavy Impact	"You Should Be Dancing" by The Bee Gees	Strut
Static Noyze	"A Fifth of Beethoven" by Walter Murphy	Finger point
Jungle Boogie	"Jungle Boogie" by Kool & the Gang	Bump

- Safe: Blueprint Cru (immunity), Saltare, Poreotix, Hype 5-0
- Bottom 3: Heavy Impact, Static Noyze, Jungle Boogie
- Eliminated: Heavy Impact, Static Noyze

=== Episode 8: Usher Challenge ===
- Original Airdate: March 18, 2010

The five remaining crews took inspiration from Usher's music videos. Usher himself gave each crew their challenges through video.

Dance Crew	Song	Challenge
Jungle Boogie	"Love in This Club" feat. Young Jeezy	Incorporate glides into the routine.
Poreotix	"Yeah!" feat. Lil Jon and Ludacris	Incorporate some of Usher's moves in reverse.
Hype 5-0	"U Don't Have to Call"	Start the routine with a grand entrance and incorporate choreography using Heelys.
Blueprint Cru	"Hey Daddy (Daddy's Home)" feat. Plies	Incorporate a hand section that highlights one of the members in their crew.
Saltare	"Caught Up"	Incorporate fight choreography from the video.

- Safe: Jungle Boogie, Poreotix, Hype 5-0
- Bottom 2: Blueprint Cru, Saltare
- Eliminated: Saltare

=== Episode 9: Illusion Challenge ===
- Original Airdate: March 25, 2010

The remaining four crews incorporated an illusion or magic act into their performance set. The crews kicked off the show with a group performance to "Take It Off" by Ke$ha with judge Lil Mama performing in the routine. Magician Franz Harary served as the magic instructor for the crews.

Dance Crew	Song	Challenge
Hype 5-0	"Morning After Dark" by Timbaland feat. Nelly Furtado and SoShy	Make an object come to life.
Poreotix	"Right Hand Hi" by Kid Sister	Move an object with their minds.
Blueprint Cru	"Funhouse" by P!nk	Become lighter than air.
Jungle Boogie	"Da Da Da" by Lil Wayne	Pass their bodies through a solid surface.

- Safe: Hype 5-0, Poreotix
- Bottom 2: Blueprint Cru, Jungle Boogie
- Eliminated: Jungle Boogie

=== Episode 10: Hip-Hop Nation Challenge & Last Chance Challenge ===
- Original Airdate: April 1, 2010

The three remaining crews demonstrated hip hop styles from across the country in the penultimate challenge of the season. For both challenges, the crews got to collaborate with producer Swizz Beatz.

==== Challenge #1: Hip-Hop Nation Challenge ====
The remaining crews displayed their mastery of hip hop styles from around the nation. One crew was eliminated halfway through the show. The crews received help from three guest ABDC alumni from past seasons. Each alumnus was assigned to one of the dance styles the crews were responsible for.

Song	Style	Guest
"Blow The Whistle" by Too $hort	Turfing	Mitch Sanedrin from Supreme Soul
"I'm The Ish" by DJ Class feat. Lil Jon	Baltimore house	Porché Anthony from Beat Ya Feet Kings
"Get Me Bodied" by Beyoncé	New Orleans bounce	Riquel Olander from We Are Heroes

- Safe: Blueprint Cru
- Bottom 2: Poreotix, Hype 5-0
- Eliminated: Hype 5-0

==== Challenge #2: Last Chance Challenge ====
The two finalists were given one last chance to perform before the lines opened for the final voting session of the season.

Dance Crew	Performance Title
Blueprint Cru	Come to Life
Poreotix	Tetreotix

=== Episode 11: The Live Finale ===
- Original Airdate: April 8, 2010

The eliminated crews all returned and performed with the finalists for a regional collaboration. Instead of going head-to-head, Poreotix and Blueprint Cru teamed up for their last performance.

Dance Crew(s)	Song
West: Poreotix, Hype 5-0, and Heavy Impact	"Blah Blah Blah" by Ke$ha
East: Blueprint Cru, Saltare, and Static Noyze	"Hot Mess" by Cobra Starship
South: Jungle Boogie, Royal Flush, and Swagger Crew	"Take Your Shirt Off" by T-Pain
Poreotix and Blueprint Cru	Pulse Percussion
Poreotix	"I Made It" by Kevin Rudolf feat. Birdman, Jay Sean, and Lil Wayne

- Winner: Poreotix
- Runner-up: Blueprint Cru

=== Episode 12: Champions for Charity ===
- Original Airdate: April 15, 2010

America's Best Dance Crew hosted a charity event featuring all five champions. The five crews opened up the show with a group performance to "All I Do Is Win" by DJ Khaled.

Season	Winner	Song	Charity
Season 1	JabbaWockeeZ	"The Final Countdown" by Europe and "Robot Remains" by The Bangerz	Less Than Four
Season 2	Super CR3W	"ABCs" by K'naan	Marvelous Connections
Season 3	Quest Crew	"Sing, Sing, Sing" by Swing Kids	Say It Loud
Season 4	We Are Heroes	"Rock That Body" by The Black Eyed Peas	The Sparkle Effect
Season 5	Poreotix	"Witch Doctor" by Alvin and the Chipmunks	Everybody Dance Now
