= The Dudesons =

Finnish stunt group

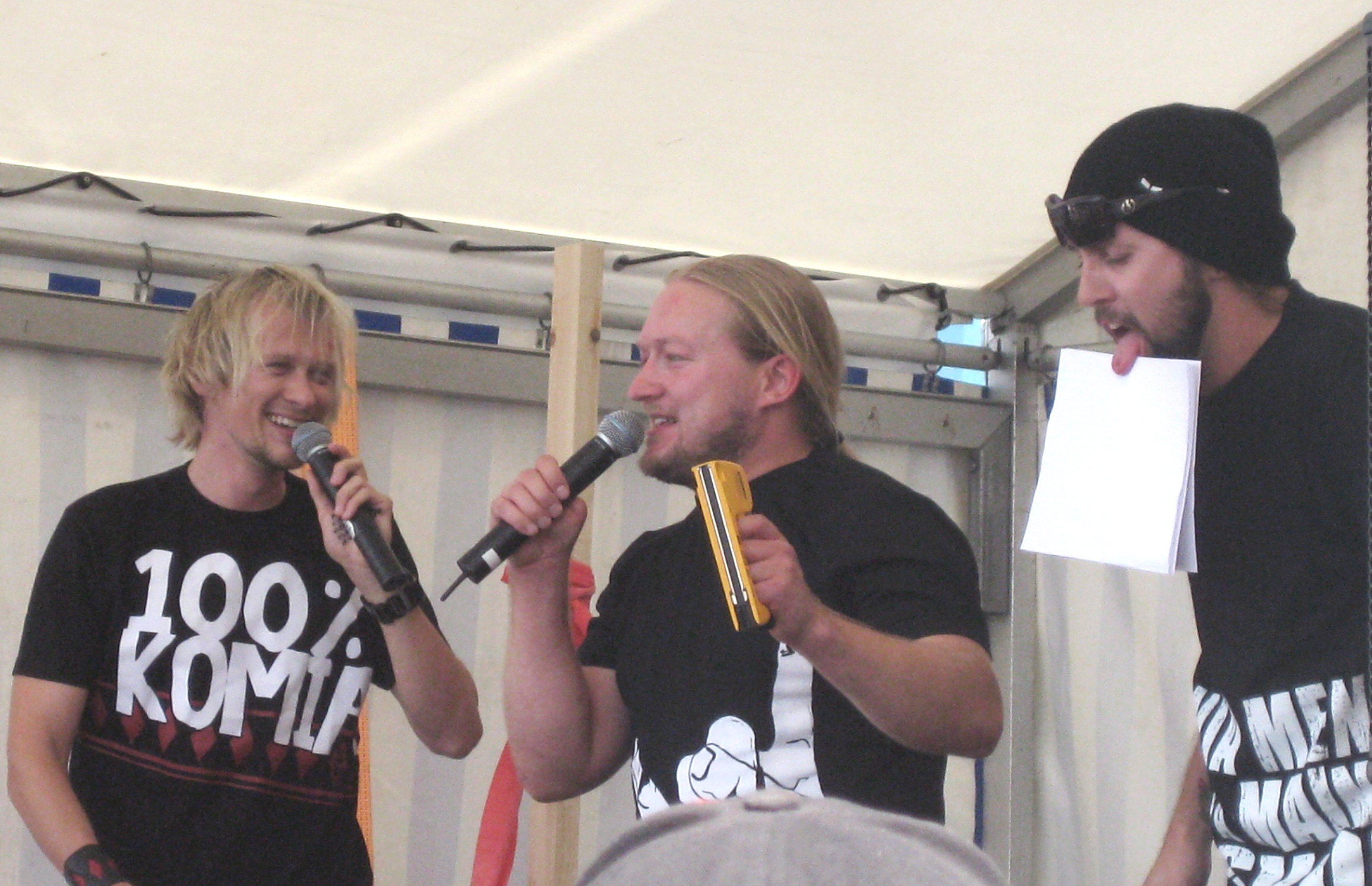
- The Dudesons in 2010
- Genre: Comedy; Reality television Stunt show Physical comedy Shock humour Slapstick; Toilet humour Pranks
- Created by: Jarno Laasala; Tuukka Tiensuu; Jukka Hildén
- Written by: Jukka Hildén; Jarno Laasala; Jarppi Leppälä; Hannu-Pekka "HP" Parviainen; Tuukka Tiensuu; Elina Martevo
- Directed by: Tuukka Tiensuu; Jarno Laasala
- Starring: Jukka Hildén; Jarppi Leppälä; Hannu-Pekka "HP" Parviainen; Jarno Laasala
- Narrated by: Jarppi Leppälä
- Music by: Janne Vianto
- Opening theme: "In the Hall of the Mountain King" by Edvard Grieg
- Country of origin: Finland
- Original languages: Finnish; English
- No. of seasons: 6 (Original series); 5 (English series)
- No. of episodes: 46

Production
- Executive producer: Jarno Laasala
- Producer: Jarno Laasala
- Cinematography: Tuukka Tiensuu; Jarno Laasala
- Editors: Janne Vianto; Matti Mikkonen; Tuukka Tiensuu; Jarno Laasala
- Running time: 25 minutes
- Production company: Rabbit Films

Original release
- Network: MoonTV (FIN); Nelonen (FIN); Sub (FIN); Spike (USA); Channel V (AUS); TV 2 Zebra (NOR); MTV (LA); OLN (CAN)
- Release: 25 January 2001 – 6 August 2016

The Dudesons (Finnish: Duudsonit) are a Finnish entertainment group. They are best known for their TV shows and live performances, which are a combination of stunts and comedy. Their early TV shows were similar to Jackass. Starting their television career in the early 2000s, they gained international fame and had a show on the American television channel MTV in 2010. After The Dudesons in America, the group started to shift from the stunts to more multidimensional careers.

== Background ==
The Dudesons consists of Jukka Hildén (b. 1980), Jarppi Leppälä (b. 1979), Jarno Laasala (b. 1979) and Hannu-Pekka "HP" Parviainen (b. 1981). All were from the town of Seinäjoki, where Hildén, Leppälä, and Laasala became close friends while attending elementary school together, where they later met Parviainen.

As teenagers, the four became quite interested in snowboarding, skateboarding and downhill mountain biking. In the early 1990s, when Laasala got his first video camera, the group began filming their activities which eventually led to further pranks and extreme stunts. They created and sold VHS tapes which were filmed and edited by Laasala and subsequently their reputation began to grow in Seinäjoki.

== Original Finnish TV series ==
In January 2000, Jarno Laasala obtained a job as an editor for a small Finnish cable TV channel called MoonTV. Similar to the American show Jackass, he saw a possibility to make his own show out of all the stunts the Dudesons had filmed. After finishing high school, the Dudesons set up their own production company called Rabbit Films. The group immediately began shooting a self-financed pilot episode of their own show.

This pilot was finished in August 2000 and the channel immediately green lit the first season, titled as "Maailmankiertue" (Worldtour). The episodes began airing in January 2001, and the series became the most popular show on MoonTV. In September 2001, the Dudesons moved from MoonTV to a nationwide TV channel Nelonen. The 2nd season, called "Extreme Duudsonit, Maailmankiertue 2", was first screened in 2002, and the same year the Dudesons were also elected as The Media Persons of the Year by the readers of Finland's most popular youth magazine Suosikki. The 3rd (Maailmankiertue 3) and 4th seasons (Duudsoni Elämää) of Extreme Duudsonit ran respectively in 2003 and 2004.

Recurring stunts and segments on the English-language version of the Dudesons includes: the "Human Dartboard," playing pranks on "Mr. Hitler" and a vast array of other stunts with "absolute disregard for [their] own safety."

== International career ==
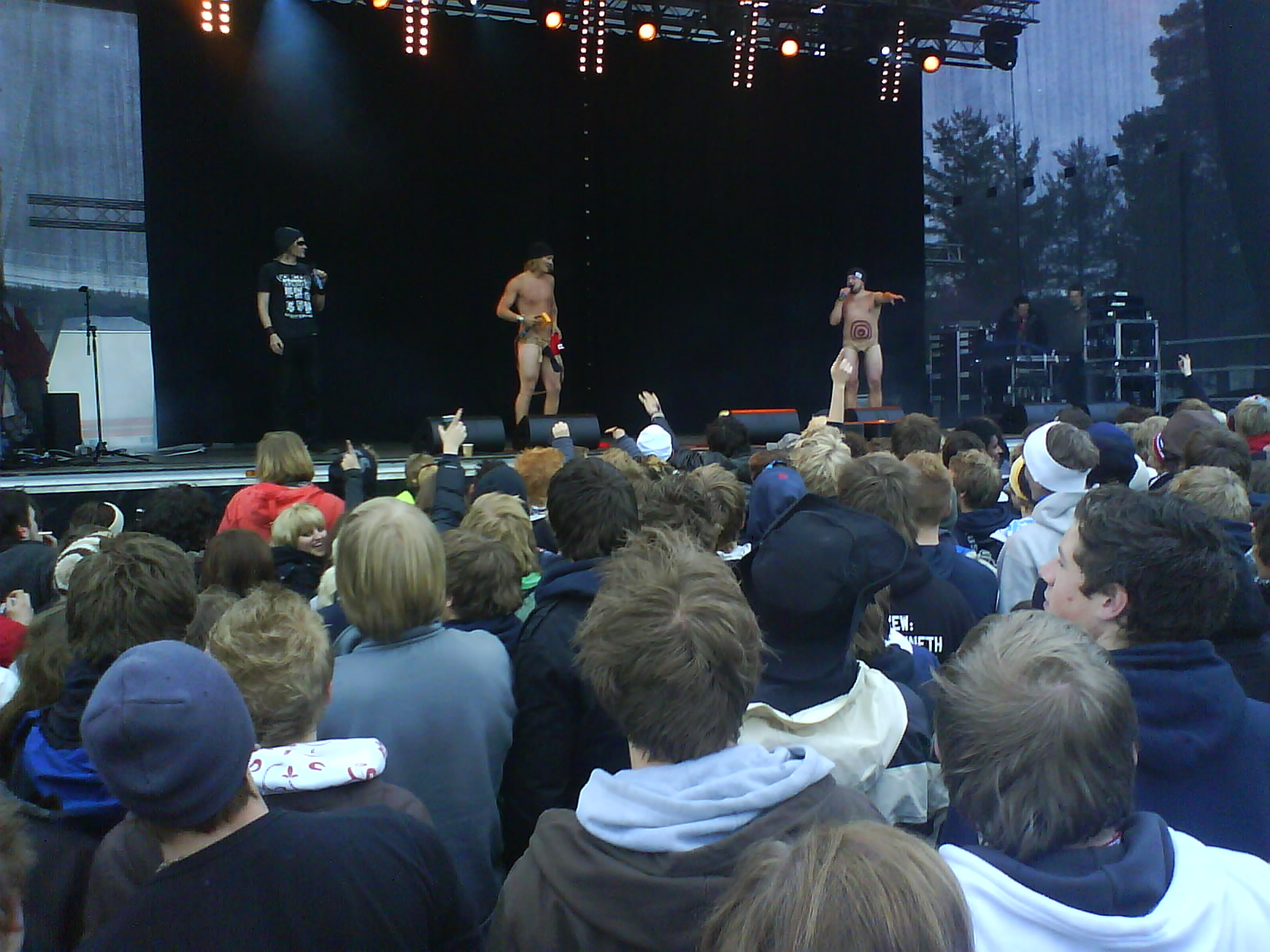
The Dudesons live at Lillehammer

In 2003, the Dudesons made a decision to start making English-language material in order to find international distribution. Their following series, Duudsoni Elämää, was shot both in Finnish and English. The material was then edited both into Finnish-language series, and English language series. The Finnish series ran in 2004, while the English series had its international debut at Australian Channel V in February 2006. The American debut was on SpikeTV on 6 July 2006.

The Dudesons appeared in one episode of Jimmy Kimmel Live! together in 2006.

Jarppi, Jukka, and Jarno can be seen on Bam Margera's Viva La Bam. Jarppi and Jukka can also be seen on Bam Margera Presents: Where the ♯$&% Is Santa? (2008) and Minghags (2009).

Jukka appeared on Tom Green Live! on 10 October 2006 as a special guest with Steve-O from Jackass.

By September 2007, the Dudesons Season 1 had been shown in 22 countries around the world, making it the most widespread Finnish TV-series of all time. The second season began in Australia on 20 May 2008 on Channel V. By the year 2010, different Dudesons seasons have been seen in over 150 countries.

In 2008, Jarppi, Jukka, and Jarno introduced Paramore in the Los Premios MTV Latinoamérica 2008.

The Dudesons are also featured in the hit 2010 movie Jackass 3D, alongside Johnny Knoxville. All four Dudesons were seen on the red carpet at the Jackass 3D premiere. The Dudesons are also in the 2011 movie Jackass 3.5.

The Dudesons presented the best hip hop award for the 2010 MTV Europe Music Awards.

The Dudesons appeared as musical performers in one episode of Skavlan together in 2011.

The Dudesons also appeared as a guest in one episode of Loiter Squad in 2013.

Jarppi and Jukka also made an appearance in one episode of Ridiculousness in 2014.

Jukka, along with Steve-O from Jackass, both participated in the web series titled Ultimate Expedition in 2018. Jukka served as an executive producer for this series.

== Episodes ==
=== Season 1: 2006 ===
No.	Title	Original release date
1–101	"Introducing the Dudesons"	6 July 2006
The Dudesons introduce themeselves, and perform new death-defying stunts, resulting in them repeatedly going to the hospital with broken bones.
2–102	"Mayhem on the Dudesons Ranch"	13 July 2006
The Dudesons try out new car stunts. They join up with Jimmy Pop and Evil Jared Hasselhoff from the Bloodhound Gang, and Bam Margera from Jackass and the CKY crew in "The Human Dart Board", and perform a wake up call with a metal baseball bat.
3–103	"Destroying a Supermarket"	20 July 2006
The Dudesons get a summer job at a grocery store, but in the end they end up destroying the whole place.
4–104	"Freezing to Death"	27 July 2006
It's winter in the arctic circle and the Dudesons are freezing to death, so they go to Mexico and cause mayhem with the cast of Viva La Bam.
5–105	"Neighbor Wars"	3 August 2006
The Dudesons start a war against their old neighbor Mr. Hitler. Steve-O from Jackass also shows up.
6–106	"Fire in the House"	10 August 2006
The Dudesons go on a live tour, destroy a rock festival and accidentally burn down their house.
7–107	"Friendship Hurts"	24 September 2006
The Dudesons meet up with Bam Margera in Las Vegas, Nevada for Viva La Bam and perform live shows in front of thousands of people.
8–108	"Dudesons Top 10"	1 October 2006
The Dudesons break down the top 10 best moments of the season.

=== Season 2: 2008 ===
No.	Title	Original release date
8–201	"The Desperate Househunters"	13 June 2008
Jarppi, Jukka, and Jarno reunite with HP after traveling the world for six months. The destruction of the ranch from last season suddenly dawns on them and they hunt for a new place to live.
9–202	"The Prank Wars"	2 May 2008
Jarno pulls a classic prank on Jarppi causing a full-scale Dudesons prank war. The Dudesons also throw a house warming party for the new ranch.
10–203	"The Dudesons Road Trip"	9 May 2008
The Dudesons have a new van and decide to go on a road trip. Stopping along the way for fun and mayhem.
11–204	"Super Heroes"	16 May 2008
The Dudesons become super heroes, and after intense training, are released onto the unsuspecting public to save the world.
12–205	"Britney's Birthday"	23 May 2008
Britney is unwell. Fearing he will not be well enough for his special birthday party, the Dudesons take him to the vet, and do stunts do celebrate his birthday.
13–206	"Cops & Robbers"	30 May 2008
The Dudesons have a contest to see who can get themselves arrested in the most inventive and imaginative way. The winner gets to drive a tank.
14–207	"The Dudesons Olympics"	6 June 2008
The Dudesons host their own special olympics. Jarno and Jukka vs. HP and Jarppi in five events. The losers have to lick the bottom of the winners' shoes.

=== Season 3: 2009 ===
No.	Title	Original release date
15–301	"Astronauts"	9 January 2009
Jarppi blows up a building with himself on top of it. The Dudesons then make a space shuttle out of an old car and try to see if they can launch themselves into space.
16–302	"Follow the Leader"	16 January 2009
The Dudesons play a variation of "Follow the Leader" with the losers marching in a three man gay parade around town.
17–303	"Dream Jobs"	23 January 2009
The Dudesons live out their childhood dreams. HP becomes a firefighter, Jarppi becomes a construction worker, Jarno becomes a police officer, and Jukka becomes a life guard.
18–304	"Dudesons World War"	30 January 2009
Each Dudeson forms a country and takes over a part of the Dudesons Ranch; The United States of Jukka, Kingdom of Jarppi, The Republic of Jarno, and HP's Developing Country.
19–305	"Motor Heads"	6 February 2009
The Dudesons create a crash car called the Dudesons Mobile. It is equipped with weapons, a defense system, and artificial intelligence.
20–306	"Winter Olympics with Bam Margera"	13 February 2009
While filming Where the ♯$&% Is Santa?, Bam Margera, Brandon Novak and the Dudesons compete for olympic gold. The teams are Bam and Jukka vs. Novak and Jarppi.
21–307	"Return of Jarppi's Thumb"	20 February 2009
Jarppi and the rest of the Dudesons travel to Helsinki to get Jarppi's thumb. Then they have a funeral party for the 10-year-old thumb.
22–308	"Dudesons Top 10"	27 February 2009
The Dudesons host the top 10 moments of the season followed by trailer destruction derby.

=== Season 4: 2010 ===
No.	Title	Original release date
23–401	"Follow the leader: Winter edition"	15 January 2010
The Dudesons are playing "Follow the Leader" once again. This time in the snowy Ylläs in Lapland. The loser will get snowballs thrown at them in the wall of shame by the winner.
24–402	"Santa's Little Helpers"	22 January 2010
The Dudesons try to see what is it like to be Santa Claus and his assistants. They also build the ultimate Santa sled
25–403	"Dirty Bets in Australia"	29 January 2010
Jarppi, Jukka, and Jarno go to Australia and meet with the Dirty Sanchez cast. Jarppi and Jukka also play bets against each other, and the loser has to get handcuffed by the balls to a pole in public.
26–404	"Dudesons' Battle Robot"	5 February 2010
The Dudesons build a robot and then fight against it. They test the robot's various weapons on themselves before equipping them.
27–405	"Dudesons Do America"	12 February 2010
Jarppi, Jukka, and Jarno do a promotional tour in America, and meet Johnny Knoxville, and the Nitro Circus cast.
28–406	"Back to Basics"	19 February 2010
The Dudesons rebuild their sauna after Jukka destroyed it in the last season. In the meantime, they do simple stunts with bicycles, cars, and snowboards.
29–407	"How Did the Dudesons Start"	26 February 2010
The Dudesons tell how they started and their growing popularity, and also do new stunts.
30–408	"Dudesons Top 10"	5 March 2010
The Dudesons talk about the top 10 moments of season four and HP gets hit by a giant wrecking ball.

=== The Dudesons in America: 2010 ===
After a multimillion-dollar deal with MTV, a new show called The Dudesons in America was green lit. With a budget of six million dollars, it would consist of the same line-up of all four Dudesons, and was set to be produced by both Johnny Knoxville and Jeff Tremaine. The Dudesons' own production company, Rabbit Films, decided to do the show with the co-operation of Knoxville and Tremaine's company, Dickhouse Productions. "The Dudesons have balls where there should be brains and I am honored to be doing a show with them," Knoxville says on the Dudesons's official website. However, after the episode Cowboys & Findians, MTV changed the time the episode would air for unknown reasons. The Dudesons stated on their official Facebook page that the show would continue on 16 July 2010 and has since ended.

The first episode was shown on MTV 6 May 2010. The Dudesons in America first aired on 1 August 2010 in the UK, on MTV Bang.

No.	Title	Original release date
31–501	"Follow the Leader"	6 May 2010
The Dudesons are playing "Follow the Leader" once again in California, US. The winner gets to stay in the master bedroom, while the losers have to get USA branded on their asses. Guest starring Johnny Knoxville from Jackass.
32–502	"Cowboys & Findians"	13 May 2010
The Dudesons want to know if they can hack it like the original Americans once did, so they have found a Native American mentor named Saginaw who has agreed to lead them through seven painful rites of passage. (MTV pulled this episode from distribution after American Indians protested its racist stereotyping.)
33–503	"Spaced"	20 May 2010
The Dudesons decide to build their own rocket and launch it where no man has gone before - Uranus!
34–504	"Abusement Park"	16 July 2010
The Dudesons take their extreme antics to an amusement park, or as they like to call it, an "abusement park". Guest starring Andy Bell from Nitro Circus.
35–505	"American Frontiersmen"	23 July 2010
The Dudesons try to survive a harsh winter in the Rocky Mountains to learn more about American pioneers. Guest starring Johnny Knoxville from Jackass, and Erik Roner from Nitro Circus.
36–506	"Armed Forces"	30 July 2010
The Dudesons start their own army in order to adequately fight Canada if they ever attack the United States.
37–507	"Alien Invasion"	6 August 2010
The Dudesons built a series of 'what to do in case of alien invasion' tests to ward off an imminent invasion from space.
38–508	"Winter Games"	13 August 2010
The Dudesons battle one another for the title of "King of the Mountain". The teams are Jarppi and HP vs Jukka and Jarno. The winners get to do a 360 jump with a car, and the losers have to get their asses licked by goats. Guest starring Bam Margera and Ryan Dunn of Jackass and the CKY crew.
39–509	"Action Heroes"	20 August 2010
The Dudesons love Hollywood action films so much they decide to reenact some of Hollywood's biggest on screen stunts. Guest starring film producer Lawrence Gordon.
40–510	"American Jock"	27 August 2010
America is a country obsessed with sports, and the Dudesons want to try to understand what it's all about by immersing themselves in all things sport. The teams are Jarppi and Jukka vs HP and Jarno. The winners get to crash a school bus, and the losers get a swirly. Guest starring Johnny Knoxville from Jackass.
41–511	"Dudes Mobile"	4 September 2010
The Dudesons, like Americans, love their cars. So they decide to build one and race it against their new American dudes
42–512	"American History"	4 September 2010
With the help of their history teacher, The Dudesons start learning about some of America's most important historical moments.

=== Season 5: 2016 ===
No.	Title	Original release date
43–601	"Undercover Dudesons"	2 July 2016
The Dudesons go undercover and start messing with unsuspecting people in public.
44–602	"Dudesons in Africa"	9 July 2016
The Dudesons go to Liberia in an attempt to bring joy and happiness to the residents of Yarmah Town.
45–603	"Dudesons Exposed"	16 July 2016
The Dudesons reveal unseen sights of their lives, what happened to their 2 old ranches, the mysterious 5th Dudeson, why they had to change after The Dudesons in America, and prank Mr. Hitler one last final time.
46–604	"Dudesons Home Invasion"	23 July 2016
The Dudesons help a family in need in their own style.
47–605	"Gumball Rally in America"	30 July 2016
The Dudesons participate in the Gumball 3000 in the U.S. They drive from New York City to Los Angeles in 7 days. Guest starring: rappers Bun B, Eve, and Madcon; actor David Hasselhoff; Mathew Pritchard and Lee Dainton from Dirty Sanchez; Gumball 3000 founder Maximillion Cooper; TV personality Howie Mandel; and automaker Charles Morgan
48–606	"Kill Your Darlings"	6 August 2016
The Dudesons show stuff they had to cut from this season, and perform a live stunt show at the Monster Jam in Helsinki. Guest starring; Monster truck driver Charlie Pauken; Alpine skiing racer Jens Byggmark, snowmobile professional Stian Pedersen, and parkour professional Marcus "Zyrken" Gustafsson.

== The Dudesons Movie (2006) ==
The international launch of the Dudesons TV-series was supported by the full-length feature film The Dudesons Movie, which was released theatrically in Finland on 31 March 2006, and straight to DVD in a dozen other countries. It was released in the US on 11 July 2006 by Warner Rhino. Despite mixed reviews from Finnish mainstream critics, the film won the "Audience's Favorite Movie" at Jussi Awards, the Finnish equivalent of Oscars, with about 47% of votes. It features guest appearances from Steve-O, Bam Margera, Ryan Dunn, Raab Himself, Phil Margera, April Margera, and Don Vito.

== Duudsonit Tuli Taloon (2013–2018, 2023) ==
Filming the show The Dudesons in America was an exhausting experience for the Dudesons and they wanted to take the group to a new direction after it. They created the show Duudsonit Tuli Taloon (lit. 'The Dudesons: Home Invasion'), in which they helped families with their problems.

== Dudesons Do Gumball (2013) ==
In 2013, the Dudesons filmed and launched their own three-part series when taking part in the Gumball 3000 event. The show aired exclusively on Extreme Sports Channel, and followed the Finns as they travelled from Copenhagen, Denmark to Monaco. This year they had a Cadillac SUV which had the look of a blue elephant. During the race through Europe they had their "Wheel of Fortune", which was used for different types of pranks.

Guest stars include; Gumball 3000 founder Maximillion Cooper, rappers Xzibit, Eve, Bun B, and Elastinen, actor David Hasselhoff, pro freeskier Jon Olsson, Lee Dainton from Dirty Sanchez, MMA fighter and bodybuilder Robert Burneika, TV personality Dex Carrington, and pro skater Tony Hawk.

== Posse (2014–2022) ==
Posse was a Finnish show hosted by The Dudesons. It featured the Dudesons doing different challenges and ending up in difficult scenarios in front of a live audience in their home country.

== Duudsonit: Päällikkö (2019) ==
In 2019, The Dudesons hosted the television show Duudsonit: Päällikkö (lit. 'The Dudesons: Chief'), in which a group of contestants competed in challenges.

== Duudsonit-elokuva: Kotiinpaluu (2026) ==
A new movie, titled Duudsonit-elokuva: Kotiinpaluu (lit. 'The Dudesons Movie: Homecoming'), was released theatrically in Finland on 27 March 2026. It features a return to the stunts and pranks similar to their TV series, and was also filmed at their old ranch featured in the TV series. It is written by The Dudesons, and Pekko Pesonen. The film is directed by Jarno Laasala, and produced by Eve Särkänne and Tiina Pesonen, with Jarno and Jukka Hildén serving as executive producers. Jukka's wife Chachi Gonzales, and their daughter Isabella made guest appearances throughout the film. The total budget of the movie was €1,2 million, which the Dudesons financed half of themselves. An English version of the movie is set to release later.

The movie begins with a compilation of old footage, followed by Jarno telling the other Dudesons that he really wants to make another movie. After some thinking, they all eventually agree and return to their old ranch featured in the TV series to film most of the stunts and pranks. The most notable bits include; all 4 Dudesons racing through an explosive destruction derby together; Jarppi Leppälä and Jukka medieval jousting on shopping carts as they are pulled by ropes from a helicopter that flies up; HP Parviainen embarrassingly crashing random strangers' wedding while wearing an earpiece, while the other Dudesons are telling him what to do and say; and Jarno unsuspectingly getting trapped in an outhouse that gets lifted off the ground by a helicopter. The movie ends with HP redoing the classic moped jump stunt from the first season where he previously broke his leg in 3 different places. A compilation of deleted scenes is played during the end credits.

== See also ==
- Jackass
- Dirty Sanchez
- Nitro Circus
