= Super Cr3w =

American hip hop group

- Origin: Las Vegas, Nevada, United States
- Genres: B-boying, hip-hop dance
- Years active: 2000-2015
- Past members: Jonathan "Do-Knock" Cruz; Abenamar Honrubia; Ronnie “Ronnie Boy” Abaldonado; Mike “Mike Murda” Carrasco; RJ “Rockadile” Puno; Steve “Stevezoo” Corrall; Fabiano “Neguin” Lopez; Rynan “Kid Rainen” Paguio; Chris “Crisstyles” Gatdula; Angelito “Vex” Casal; Quetzal Guerrero; Faye "Faye Boogie" Lim

Super Cr3w (pronounced "Super Crew" and also spelled "Super CR3W") is a breakdance crew from Las Vegas, Nevada who won the second season of America's Best Dance Crew.

== Early history ==
Before their popularity on ABDC, Super Cr3w was formed from three different b-boy dance crews (all from the west) and formed a "Super Crew" of their own.

Battle Monkeys
Jon “Do-Knock” Cruz
RJ "Rockadile" Puno
Angelito “Vex” Casal
Full Force Crew
Ronnie “Ronnieboy” Abaldonado
Faye "Faye Boogie" Lim
Chris "Cristyle" Gatdula
Angelito “Vex” Casal
RJ "Rockadile" Puno
Rynan "Kid Rainen" Paguio
Knucklehead Zoo
Michael "Mike Murda" Carrasco
Abenamar "Ben" Horubia

=== Connection with the Jabbawockeez ===
The Jabbawockeez and Super CR3W have a unique history together. Cristyle, a member of the Jabbawockeez, is also a member of "Full Force Crew" with original "Super CR3W" member Ronnieboy before their ABDC wins. And in recent years, fellow Jabbawockeez member Kid Rainen, had joined "Full Force", later adding "Super CR3W" members Do-Knock, Vex, & Rockadile to the crew. In May 2010, Jabbawockeez had their own show at the MGM Grand in Vegas and asked Ronnie, Do-Knock, Ben, and Rock from Super Cr3w to perform with them. Super Cr3w dressed up in masks and danced with the Jabbawockeez. The connection between the two crews is so strong that they often call themselves the "Super Wockeez" when they are together.

== America’s Best Dance Crew Season 2 ==
Super Cr3w became America's Best Dance Crew's season two champions in August 2008.

=== Season 2 Performances ===
Week	Challenge	Music	Result		
1: Crew's Choice Challenge	Choose their own songs	Get Up Offa That Thing by James Brown	Safe		
2: Video Star Challenge	Each crew was given a different video with a dance sequence in it	Run It! by Chris Brown	Safe		
3: Rock The Title Challenge	Each crew was given a song whose title was used as inspiration for their performance	We Fly High by Jim Jones	Safe		
4: Speed Up Challenge	Turn the slow songs to the fast song	Creator by Santigold	Safe		
5: Janet Jackson Challenge	Give Janet a song with an incorporate moves	Rhythm Nation and Black Cat by Janet Jackson	Bottom 2		
6: Bring The Beat Challenge	Use the song and school subject as the dance routines	Don't Touch Me (Throw da Water on 'em) by Busta Rhymes	Bottom 2		
7: Missy Elliott Challenge	Give the songs to Missy Elliott	Shake Your Pom Pom and We Run This by Missy Elliott	Safe		
8: 80's theme Challenge	Humpty dance	Bust a Move by Young MC	Safe	The Humpty Dance by Digital Underground	Word Up! by Cameo
9: Championship Showdown	2 minutes	Give It Up or Turn It Loose by James Brown	Bottom 2		
10: The Live Finale	Partner: SoReal Cru	"Puttin' on the Ritz", "It's Me Snitches" by Swizz Beatz and "In the Ayer" by Flo Rida	Champions		
10: The Live Finale	Victory Dance after being announced season's 2 ABDC winners	"Dope Boys" by The Game	Champions		
Special: Champions for Charity	Partners: Jabbawockeez; Quest Crew; We Are Heroes; Poreotix	"All I Do Is Win" by DJ Khaled with the past ABDC winners	Helped for Charity		
Special: Champions for Charity	Partners: Jabbawockeez; Quest Crew; We Are Heroes; Poreotix	"ABCs" by K'naan	Helped for Charity		

=== Week 0: Live Auditions Special ===
Aired on June 7, 2008, Super CR3W was introduced to audiences through a series of questions by judges JC Chasez, Shane Sparks and Lil Mama. JC Chasez asked to hear more about the "very accomplished B-boys" in the crew, to which Do-Knock replied about having "some nasty cats" on his squad, stating members' individual accomplishments such as Ronnie's 2007 Red Bull BC One championship, Murda and Ben's two-time Battle of the Year wins, and his own Star Search win.

=== Week 1: Crew's Choice Challenge ===
- Aired on June 19, 2008,

Each crew performed to songs of their own choosing. Super CR3W selected the song "Get Up Offa That Thing" by James Brown and performed in Ninja costumes. Accordingly, their dance moves were Ninja-influenced. Super CR3W was in the bottom 5, but after their performance to "Get Up Offa That Thing", Super CR3W's fanbase quickly grew and Super Cr3w became one of the top contenders. Taboo from The Black Eyed Peas was seen during this episode holding up the Super CR3W hand sign right after their performance.

=== Week 2: Video Star Challenge ===
- Aired on June 26, 2008,

Each crew was given a different video with a dance sequence in it, which they had to perform while keeping their own style as a crew. Super CR3W was given the music video for "Run It!" by Chris Brown. They used the element of krumping from the video and mixed it in with B-boy moves such as the deuce deuce. JC Chasez said afterward that he saw more tricks than dancing and would like to see actual dance moves incorporated into their next performance, to which Shane Sparks countered to by saying break dancing and tricks is dancing.

=== Week 3: Rock The Title Challenge ===
- Aired on July 3, 2008,

Each crew was given a song whose title was used as inspiration for their dance. Super CR3W received the song "We Fly High" by Jim Jones. As part of the challenge, they dressed in Clark Kent uniforms and performed "flying" moves such as Ben's air flare and the crew's airplane transformation. The judges, especially Shane Sparks, were ecstatic with Super CR3W's performance, complimenting the crew's ability to complete the challenge they were given. Chris Gatdula, member of The Jabbawockeez, Super CR3W and Full Force, from season 1 of America's Best Dance Crew were seen wearing Super CR3W's T-shirts and cheering for them.

=== Week 4: Speed Up Challenge ===
- Aired on July 10, 2008,

Crews must transition from a slow song to a faster one while still remaining on beat.[6] Super CR3W chose the song “Creator” by Santogold. Jon Cruz dressed as a graffiti artist while the rest of the crew were painted gold to replicate gold statues. For the challenge, the crew used the 6-step B-boy move at an incrementing speed to transition from slow to fast.

=== Week 5: Janet Jackson Challenge ===
- Aired on July 17, 2008,

Each crew was given a Janet Jackson song and had to incorporate some of her moves into their dance, similar to the Michael Jackson challenge of Season 1.[7] Super CR3W received Black Cat by Janet Jackson. For the first time ever, Super CR3W was in the bottom two against A.S.I.I.D. However, Super Cr3w managed to beat A.S.I.I.D and remain in the competition. Shane Sparks told Super Cr3w that "they're finally back!"

=== Week 6: Bring The Beat Challenge ===
- Aired on July 24, 2008,

Each crew was given a song and a school subject to use as the theme for this week's prop-oriented dance routines. Super CR3W was given the song "Don't Touch Me" by Busta Rhymes and the subject of basketball. For the second time in the show (and in a row), they were in the bottom two, this time against Supreme Soul, but once again they were saved from elimination.

=== Week 7: Missy Elliott Challenge ===
- Aired on July 31, 2008,

Each crew was given a song by Missy Elliott and had to adapt the videos' innovative footwork to showcase their own style. Super CR3W was given the song "We Run This" by Missy Elliott They were not in the bottom 2 this time. All three judges gave them praise and positive feedback, and guest judge Missy Elliott claimed Super CR3W's choreography was so hot, they made her video "look wack" as a compliment to show how great their performance was.

=== Week 8: 80's theme Challenge ===
- Aired on August 7, 2008
- Challenge #1: Groove Step Challenge

Using the songs Bust A Move by Young MC, Humpty Dance by Digital Underground and Word Up by Cameo, Super CR3W had to create a routine using a dance from the 80s. Like the "Dance Craze Challenge" from Season 1, crews were given a physical challenge to complete during their routine. Super CR3W had to perform the Humpty Dance with only 4 feet on the floor.

- Challenge #2: Dance Movie Challenge

Crews must create a routine that incorporates elements of an 80s dance movie. Similar to the "Broadway Challenge" from Season 1, crews were given remixed versions of the songs from their respective movies. Super CR3W were given the movie Footloose. All three judges gave Super CR3W high praises for both of their amazing performances this week.

=== Week 9: Championship Showdown ===
- Aired August 14, 2008

World Dance Challenge Both crews had to create a 2-minute routine that had different forms of world dance such as Latin, Reggae, Punjabi dance, and African Music. The songs included "Mas Que Nada" by Sérgio Mendes featuring The Black Eyed Peas, "We Be Burnin''" by Sean Paul, "The Anthem" by Pitbull featuring Lil Jon, and "Mundian to Bach Ke" by Panjabi MC featuring Twista. Only Super Cr3w received raving reviews from the judges

- Dance Craze Challenge

Both crews had to create their own dance craze and had to record their own music for it. Super Crew recorded "S to the chest" by Super Cr3w.

- Final Challenge: Your Last Word Challenge

Crews will create a routine that shows why they should be crowned "America’s Best Dance Crew". Super Cr3w performed to Give It Up or Turn It Loose by James Brown.

=== Week 10: Live Finale ===
- Aired August 21, 2008

Super Cr3w and SoReal Cru opened the show with a special performance together. SuperCr3w came out in a jacket that was half of the Philippine flag and half of the Puerto Rican flag because half the crew was Filipino the other half is Puerto Rican. All crews later came together to dance for their respective regions, and Super Cr3w teamed up with Fanny Pak and Supreme Soul to represent the west coast. A total of 39 million votes were submitted and Super Cr3w were crowned the title of America's Best Dance Crew.

== Other appearances ==
TV

- 2003: Star Search on CBS Jon Cruz (by himself), Ronnie Abaldonado and Ben Honrubia (with Knucklehead Zoo).
- 2008: America's Best Dance Crew Season 2 champions on MTV
- 2009: America's Best Dance Crew promo commercial for Season 3 on MTV
- 2009: Pepsi Smash Commercial featuring the whole crew
- 2009: For the Love of Ray J season 2 guest performers on VH1
- 2009: DJ Hero commercial with Mike Murda
- 2009: T-mobile commercial with Do-Knock
- 2009: So You Think You Can Dance finale with Do-Knock as a guest performer with the Groovaloos
- 2009: Interviewed by LatiNation
- 2009: Interviewed by Balitang America
- 2010: Guest performance on Lopez Tonight Show on TBS
- 2010: ABDC Champions for Charity
- 2011: ABDC: Season of Superstars Finale

Film

- 2004: You Got Served Only Jon Cruz.
- 2007: Planet B-Boy Only Mike Carrasco, Jon Cruz and Abenamar "Ben" Honrubia (with Knucklehead Zoo).
- 2008: Meet the Spartans Only Jon Cruz and Rufino Puno.
- 2009: Turn it Loose Only Ronnie.
- 2011: Honey 2 as Themselves
- 2013: Battle of the Year: Dream Team Only Jon Cruz

Big Competitions

- 2004: Ronnie is runner-up in Red Bull BC One 2004 in Biel, Switzerland
- 2005: Ronnie wins 3rd place in Red Bull BC One 2005 in Berlin, Germany
- 2006: Ronnie is runner-up in Red Bull BC One 2006 in São Paulo, Brazil
- 2007: Ronnie becomes champion at Red Bull BC One 2007 in Johannesburg, South Africa
- 2008: Ronnie is a participant in Red Bull BC One 2008 in Paris, France
- 2008: Super Cr3w finishes top 16 at Freestyle Session 10.
- 2008: Super Cr3w wins Season 2 of Americas Best Dance Crew
- 2009: Ronnie judges Red Bull BC One 2009 and promotes Red Bull BC One 2009 through a commercial
- 2009: World of Dance Showcase and Winner of 5 on 5 champions
- 2009: Hip Hop International Showcase
- 2009: Battle of the Year 2009 repping USA only Ben and Mike with Knucklehead Zoo. This is the only crew invited that year for a spot to rep their country; other countries battled for their spot
- 2009: Suck My Kiks (in Japan) 3 on 3 champions
- 2009: Ben in an exhibition battle at Claws Out 4 against Wing who is Red Bull BC One 2008 Champion
- 2009: Ronnie and RJ judge in Athens, Greece
- 2010: Ronnie&Ben as judges for Battle of the Year 2010 for CZ + SK
- 2013: Ronnie is a participant in the Red Bull BC One 2013 10 Year Anniversary in Seoul, Korea
- 2017: Super Cr3w appeared and competed on the first season of the 2017 reality program World of Dance.

Other

- 2010–present: Rock, Ben, Do-Knock, and Ronnie dress as Jabbawockeez for the daily "Mus.I.C" Las Vegas Show at the Monte Carlo.

Preceded by JabbaWockeeZ	America's Best Dance Crew Champions; Super Cr3w	Succeeded by Quest Crew
