= Poreotics =

American dance group

- Origin: Westminster, California
- Genres: Hip-hop, popping, robotics
- Years active: 2007–2020
- Members: Matt "Dumbo" Nguyen; Can Trong (Can) Nguyen; Lawrence (Law) Bravo Devera; Andrew-(Chad) Fausto Mayate; Aidan Carberry; Minoru Iwasaki; Charles Viet-Nguyen; Justin (Jet-Li) Valles; Tim Kieu

Poreotics, also known as Poreotix, is an American all-male dance crew from Westminster, California. The crew was formed in 2007 by Matthew "Dumbo" Nguyen and specializes in popping, choreography and robotics, hence the name Po-reo-tics. They have performed in numerous hip hop dance competitions, most notably coming in 1st place in the USA division of the 2009 and 2010 Hip-Hop Internationals and in other dance programs and competitions including the Vibe 15, FUSION X, Body Rock, and World Of Dance. On April 8, 2010, they were crowned the champions on the fifth season of America's Best Dance Crew. On January 14, 2011, they were crowned as Team of the Year at the World of Dance awards.

They are known for their shades, dark glasses which they wear for all of their performances. Jet Li stated that they wear the shades because it gives them character. All of them are of Southeast Asian heritage. Matthew "Dumbo" Nguyen, Can Trong Nguyen, and Charles Viet Nguyen are Vietnamese while Andrew-Chad "Chad" Fausto Mayate, Lawrence "Law" Bravo Devera, and Justin "Jet Li" Valles are Filipino.

== History ==
They are a group of young Asian males with their signature image of sunglasses. They are worn for every performance on the show and eventually signify who they are. They stand out further with the unique highlighted hair. Poreotics was formed in Westminster, California by Matthew "Dumbo" Nguyen, Can "Candy" Nguyen, and Charles Viet Nguyen in December 2007. Supposedly, Dumbo met Can at a movie theater and battled his brother. Can " Candy" Nguyen attended Garden Grove High School and Matthew Nguyen attended Rancho Alamitos High School. Subsequently, the group expanded with new members Lawrence "Law" Devera and Justin "Jet-Li" Valles. In 2009, the team chose Andrew "Chad" Fausto Mayate to substitute for Justin "Jet-Li" Valles in the 2009 Hip Hop Dance Championships. The team won first place and Andrew-Chad Fausto Mayate became a permanent member. Five out of the six crew members (Dumbo, Can, Charles, Law, and Chad) were also members of PAC Modern Dance Troupe. In 2008, both Matthew (Dumbo) and Lawrence (Law) competed on Season 3 of America's Got Talent with the crew Sick Step.

== America's Best Dance Crew ==
On February 11, 2010, Poreotics competed on the fifth season of America's Best Dance Crew. The crew danced to several songs including those of Taylor Swift and Beyonce. Through their creative ideas and synchronized choreography, they managed to utilize the stage to its fullest and become extremely popular with the audience. They brought comedy mixed with popping to America's Best Dance Crew. The live season finale aired on April 8, 2010, and Poreotix was crowned the champions of season 5 and also perform in the finale of season 7 alongside season 7 champions Elektrolytes.

== Tic Tic Tour ==
Poreotics traveled to Australia to hold their first ever official tour, called the "Tic Tic Tour". The tour consisted of 3 actual shows which took place in three major cities (Melbourne, Sydney & Adelaide). The tour also consisted of four dance workshops, performances by local Australian dance crews, and a meeting with the fans. The full tour ran from September 30 to October 10.

Tic Tic Tour
Date	Location	Venue
October 1, 2011	Melbourne	Dallas Brooks Centre
October 2, 2011	Adelaide	Her Majesty's Theatre
October 3, 2011	Sydney	Sydney City Recital Hall

In August 2011, Poreotics came back to Australia and held the 2nd tic tic tour called 'Tic Tic 2 tour' like in the first tic tic they visited many major cities Melbourne, Sydney, Adelaide and for the first time Brisbane and Perth. Joining the Poreotics will be the dance crew “Yomama Crew”,“The ArchiTEKS,” "Just Kidding Films" and many other local dance crews. Joining these dance crews will be singing acts, “Joseph Vincent” & “JR Aquino" and MyChonny as host.

== Miniotics ==
Poreotics became the first America's Best Dance Crew winners to have created a second sector of their crew after their victory. They held auditions for children ages 16 and under, who if selected would become a part of the first generation Mini-otics (Mini Poreotics). Miniotics is currently Poreotics' Junior Division as well as their only other division of the crew as of now. It is unknown whether Miniotics will perform wherever Poreotics performs, or if the two will perform separately for most of the time. Rehearsals and preparation have reportedly gone underway. They debuted alongside Poreotics at the Vibe 16 dance competition in Irvine, CA, on January 30, 2011. Miniotics later competed at Hip Hop Internationals in Las Vegas, Nevada and placed second in the Junior division representing the United States. Miniotics auditioned in ABDC Season 7 but they did not pass the audition.

== Marital status ==
- Matthew "Dumbo" Nguyen married to Tessa Elizabeth (also known as Tessa Lizz) in November 2014. Tessa was born in 1990, she works as a DJ and model. Both of them have created a common YouTube channel named "ARIUS" (previously "DumbonTess") and as same as the name on fanpage and Instagram to post their photos and clips in their daily life.
- It's been announced of their Facebook page that Charles Viet-Nguyen and Justin "Jet-Li" Valles have left Poreotics to pursue other dance interests. Both members currently focus on performing with the Kinjaz.

Law and Chad have also joined the Kinjaz while and they continue to dance with Poreotics.

== Appearances ==
Poreotics continues to dance as a group and teaches various workshops including Urban Dance Camp. Through this, they are not only growing to improve themselves but also help develop the community of dancers.

=== Television ===
- On June 26 Poreotics, minus Lawrence and Dumbo, hosted the Bridge Juniors Dance Competition in California. There were special performances by Poreotics and many other dance crews, including Choreo Cookies and Team Millennia. The live event was filmed on June 26 and was available on Pay-Per-View on June 27.
- On August 26, Poreotics was featured in the third episode of Nick Cannon's short-lived TV show "Nightlife."
- Poreotics was featured in the first season in the hit Disney Channel dance sitcom Shake It Up.
- Poreotics could possibly have their very own reality TV show called Life After ABDC: Poreotics (making them the first crew in ABDC history to host their very own television show).
- Poreotics launched a sneak preview "ABDC: Season 6" commercial on their YouTube channel on March 10, 2011.
- Poreotics made an appearance on Teen Choice 2011
- Poreotics was nominated for Best Choreography for Bruno Mars' video "The Lazy Song" at the 2011 VMA's.
- Poreotics was also aired on May at a show on Philippine network ABS-CBN noontime show called "Showtime" and later "ASAP 19"

=== Music videos ===
- Poreotics was featured in Justin Bieber and Usher's music video "Somebody to Love".
- Poreotics was featured in Bruno Mars' music video of "The Lazy Song" disguised as chimps.
- Poreotics was featured in Indian superstar Ganesh Hegde's music video "Let's Party".

=== YouTube ===
They were most notably made famous by their many appearances on "Just Kidding Films", "Just Kidding News, "Just Kidding Party" as well as the vlog channels of the members of JK.

Poreotics worked with many other individuals and groups including YouTube stars like Kevjumba and dancers like I.aM.mE crew. They continued to gain more fame on YouTube after winning and performing at several different competitions like the HIP-HOP Internationals and World of Dance.

- Poreotics was featured in nigahiga's comedy video on YouTube.
- Poreotics launched their own YouTube channel featuring videos in high definition at PoreoticsHD.
- Poreotics was also featured in Mychonny's vlogs.
- Poreotics was also featured in a YouTube video with JustKiddingFilms.
- Can Trong (Can) Nguyen works as an editor for JustKiddingFilms.
- Poreotics was also featured in Ganesh Hegde's 'Let's Party' Music Video.
- Matthew "Dumbo" Nguyen was also featured in Chelo A., Jay R, Q-York's 'Connection' Music Video.
- Poreotics members were also associated with collaborations to present (e.g. Anthony Lee, etc.)
- Charles, Law, Jet and Chad are also members of Kinjaz (Jabbawockeez x Kaba Modern x Poreotics x Mos Wanted Crew). Both Charles and Jet currently act as full time members of Kinjaz
- Poreotics was also featured in Omkar Dance Crew

=== Movies ===
- Justin (Jet Li) Valles is one of the dancers in Step Up Revolution.

He is part of "The Mob."

- Chad Mayate and Lawrence(Law) Devera were also part of Step Up: All In.

=== Other ===
- On September 1, 2019, Poreotics performed as the headliner act at food-themed fashion show Food Fashion Frenzy at food festival 626 Night Market in Arcadia, California.

Preceded by We Are Heroes	America's Best Dance Crew Champions; Poreotix	Succeeded by I.aM.mE
