= Hannu-Pekka Parviainen =

Finnish snowboarder and stunt performer (born 1981)

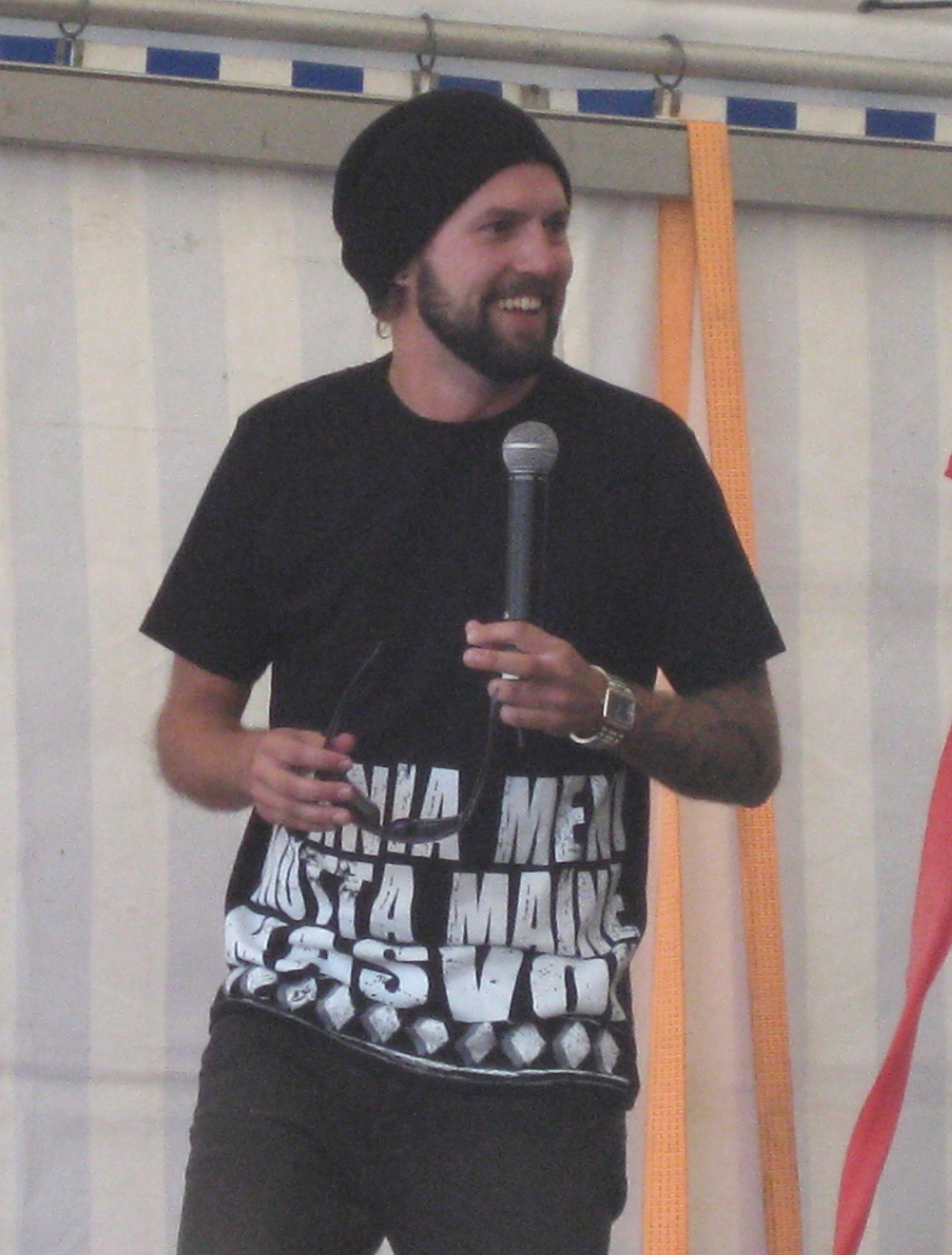
- Parviainen in 2010
- Born: Hannu-Pekka Parviainen; 18 August 1981 (age 44); Seinäjoki, South Ostrobothnia, Finland
- Other names: HP
- Occupations: Stunt performer, snowboarder
- Years active: 2001–present
- Known for: The Dudesons
- Height: 180 cm (5 ft 11 in)

Hannu-Pekka Parviainen (born 18 August 1981), nicknamed HP, is a Finnish snowboarder, stunt performer, and member of the stunt group the Dudesons.

According to an official fan page, Parviainen is no longer qualified for health insurance from any companies in Finland.

== Filmography ==
=== TV ===
Year	Title	Role	Notes
2001–2003	Maailmankiertue	Himself	Finnish
2004	Duudsoni Elämää	Himself	Finnish
2006–2016	The Dudesons	Himself	Writer
2006	Jimmy Kimmel Live!	Himself	1 episode Guest appearance
2010	The Dudesons in America	Himself	Writer; Executive producer
2010	2010 MTV Europe Music Awards	Himself	Presenter
2011	Skavlan	Himself	1 episode Musical performer
2013	Loiter Squad	Himself	1 episode Guest appearance
2013–2018	Duudsonit: Tuli Taloon	Himself	38 episodes Finnish
2014–2022	Posse	Himself	Finnish
2017–2022	Huomenta Suomi	Himself	3 episode Finnish
2019	Duudsonit: Päällikkö	Himself	Host; Finnish
2020–2021	Talent Suomi	Himself	Judge; Finnish
2021	Putous	Himself	1 episode Finnish
2021	Masked Singer Suomi	Murkku	3 episodes Finnish

=== Films ===
Year	Title	Role	Notes
2006	The Dudesons Movie	Himself	Writer
2010	Jackass 3D	Himself	Writer; Guest appearance
2011	Jackass 3.5	Himself	Writer; Guest appearance
2022	Jackass 4.5	Himself	Archive footage Uncredited
2026	Duudsonit-elokuva: Kotiinpaluu	Himself	Writer
