= Jukka Hildén =

Finnish TV personality (born 1980)

- Hildén in 2010
- Born: Jukka Henry Mikael Hildén; 3 August 1980 (age 45); Helsinki, Finland
- Occupations: Stunt performer, actor
- Years active: 2001–present
- Known for: The Dudesons
- Height: 182 cm (6 ft 0 in)
- Spouses: Outi Haapasalmi (m. 2010; div. 2018) Chachi Gonzales (m. 2019)
- Children: 5

Jukka Henry Mikael Hildén (born 3 August 1980) is a Finnish television personality and member of the entertainment and stunt group the Dudesons.

== Personal life ==
Jukka Hildén was married to Outi Haapasalmi in 2010 but they divorced in February 2018. The pair had two children together. He began dating American dancer Chachi Gonzales in 2018 and the two got engaged in August that year. They married in Lapland on 28 September 2019. Hildén and Gonzales have three children.

In 2021, Hildén was sentenced in the Helsinki District Court to ten day fines for an offence involving the use of cannabis.

== Career ==
Hildén has appeared in several television programs and films. His television career began with The Dudesons group in 2001, and he is also a shareholder in the group’s production company, Rabbit Films. Hildén has also been involved in, for example, the film Jackass 3D (2010) and as a voice actor in the Ice Age animated films.

Hildén was receiving an award in January 2011 when The Dudesons were honored with the Golden Venla Awards for Best Domestic TV Program.

In October 2022, the biography Jukka Hildén – Kivun perintö, published by Johnny Kniga and written by Jani Niipola, was released.

== Filmography ==
=== TV ===
Year	Title	Role	Notes
2001–2003	Maailmankiertue	Himself	Finnish
2001–2003	Törkytorstai	Himself	Finnish
2004	Duudsoni Elämää	Himself	Finnish
2003–2005	Viva La Bam	Himself	3 episodes
2006–2016	The Dudesons	Himself	Writer; Co-creator
2006	Jimmy Kimmel Live!	Himself	1 episode Guest appearance
2006	Tom Green Live!	Himself	Guest appearance 1 episode with Steve-O
2008	Operaatio Maa	Himself	Finnish
2008	Piilokamerapäälliköt	Himself	Finnish
2008	Los Premios MTV Latinoamérica 2008	Himself	Introduced Paramore
2009	Nitro Circus	Himself	Episode 2.1
2010	Teräspallit	Himself	Finnish
2010	The Dudesons in America	Himself	Writer; Co-creator; Executive producer
2010	2010 MTV Europe Music Awards	Himself	Presenter
2011	Skavlan	Himself	1 episode Musical performer
2012–2014, 2023	Duudsonit tuli taloon	Himself	Finnish
2013	Loiter Squad	Himself	Episode 2.6
2014	Ridiculousness	Himself	Episode 4.13
2014	2014 Kids' Choice Awards	Himself	Rodeo performer
2014–2016, 2019	Posse	Himself	Finnish; Host
2014–2020	Tanssii tähtien kanssa	Himself	Finnish; 11 episodes
2016	Huippujengi	Himself	Finnish
2018	Ultimate Expedition	Himself	Executive producer
2019	Duudsonit: Päällikkö	Himself	Finnish
2019	Huuma	Himself	Finnish; 1 episode
2020	Suurmestari	Himself	Finnish
2020	Yökylässä Maria Veitola	Himself	Finnish; 1 episode
2021	Supertähtien Yllätysremontit Suomi	Himself	Finnish
2021	Sukuni Salat	Himself	Finnish; 1 episode
2021	Flinkkilä & Kellomäki	Himself	Finnish; 1 episode
2021	Ultimate Escape Suomi	Himself	Finnish; 8 episodes
2021	Onnenpyörä VIP	Himself	Finnish; 1 episode
2022	Efter Nio	Himself	Finnish; 1 episode

=== Film ===
Year	Title	Role	Notes
2006	The Dudesons Movie	Himself	Writer; Co-creator; Additional camera
2008	Bam Margera Presents: Where the ♯$&% Is Santa?	Himself	Direct-to-video; Guest appearance
2009	Minghags	Himself	Direct-to-video
2010	Jackass 3D	Himself	Writer; Guest appearance
2011	Jackass 3.5	Himself	Writer; Guest appearance
2014	The Legend of Hercules	Creon	Scenes deleted
2016	Natural Born Pranksters	Himself	Guest appearance
2019	Iron Sky: The Coming Race	Vril Pope Urban II	
2026	Duudsonit-elokuva: Kotiinpaluu	Himself	Writer; Executive producer

=== Video games ===
Year	Title	Role	Notes
2016	Let It Die	Uncle Death	Voice
