= International Dance League =

- Also known as: IDL
- Genre: Competitive dance; Interactive
- Created by: Connor Lim; STEEZY Studios
- Presented by: JustMaiko; Megan Batoon; Ricky Cole; Clay Boonthanakit
- Judges: Dr. Arnel Calvario; Nicholas Bégin; Brian Friedman; Tessandra Chavez; Tricia Miranda; Sheo Patra; Amari Marshall; Arutro Lyons; Chonique Sneed; Jamal Sims; LaTasha Barnes; Cheyenne Kibblewhite; Handy Yacinthe; Stephen Grey; Comfort Fedoke; Carlos Irizarry; Mel Charlot; Shaun Evaristo; Brandi Chun
- Original language: English
- No. of seasons: 2

Production
- Production locations: Los Angeles, USA; New York City, USA; Vancouver, Canada; Sydney, Australia; Seoul, South Korea
- Running time: 120 minutes

Original release
- Release: July 26, 2025

The International Dance League (abbreviated as IDL) is an international competitive professional dance league featuring six established, well-known international dance crews, referred to as 'pro teams' that compete for first place through open-style choreography infusing numerous dance genres. Founded by Connor Lim of STEEZY Studio, The IDL is a league-based ecosystem for professional dance in live events through the pro division and community divisions. The series launch event started on July 26, 2025, with the competitive dancing series started on May 2, 2026 through live-streaming platforms.

The show is hosted by JustMaiko, Megan Batoon, and Ricky Cole; with Clay Boonthanakit as an analyst to the performances.

The IDL employs a select panel of judges who critique the dance crews through a scoring criteria sheet awarding points to a pro team in a two-round format per each series. The head judging panel consists of Nicolas Bégin and Dr. Arnel Calvario, who watch over the league; create and enforce rules; and preserve the results of the main judging panel.

== Format ==
The International Dance League show consists of the Pro Division and the Community Division within each series of the season. In the Pro Division, only six teams participate: Quick Style (Norway), Brotherhood (Canada), GRV (USA), Royal Family (New Zealand), Jam Republic (South East Asia), and 1Million (South Korea).

=== Pro divisions ===
In Round 1, all six teams are matched up into predetermined pairs where they perform one routine for the judges and the fan vote in hopes to proceed to Round 2. Which ever pro team wins their round advances to the second round with the losing pro team being 'knocked-out' of the series. The points that judges award, are added to their overall season standings.

In Round 2, the winning three teams then perform an entire new routine in a three-way battle. Judges scores are averaged out for the groups and depending on who wins first, is awarded seven points; second is awarded five points; and third is awarded three points, which is added to their overall standing for the season. Depending on the three teams standings, their cash prizes are also reflected on their ranking.

==== 2025 season ====
The launch event contained only one series in Los Angeles, California at the Shrine Expo Hall on July 26.

==== 2026 season ====
The 2026 season changed to having six series instead of one series as it became the inaugural competitive season. These six series take place in New York City, Vancouver, Sydney, Seoul, and two in Los Angeles (a normal series & the Championship series).

The Pro Divisions are the exact same as last season with an extended five more series and an additional two more judges. The final series, Series 6, is where the Championship takes place. However, teams are seeded in Round 1 depending on their overall season standing (e.g. first place team competes against the sixth place team) instead of it being predetermined. By Round 2, the winner is crowned as the "IDL Champion" for the season.

=== Community divisions ===
Community Divisions features top community dance teams worldwide for 10 junior teams and 10 adult teams. Teams are evaluated off of cohesion, quality, competition history, and readiness. Only first, second, and third place are chosen and receive prize money. There are new teams per each series starting in the 2026 Season.

== Series overview ==
=== 2025 season ===
The 2025 season took place in Los Angeles at the Shrine Expo Hall on July 26 as the launch event and exhibition showcase for the league. It was hosted by JustMaiko. Brian Friedman, Tessandra Chavez, Tricia Miranda, and Sheopatra were the judges for the night.

In the adult Community Division, V Mo took first place, followed by Hyphen and Commonality taking second and third.

2025 Season Launch Event Results
Match	Pro Team	Song	Result	Points
Round 1
Match 1	GRV	"GTA" by Meek Mill feat. 42 Dugg	82.25	5
Match 1	Quick Style	"Revenge" and "Everybody Dies in Their Nightmares" by XXXTentacion	76.00	0
Match 2	Brotherhood	"Move" by Lecrae & 1K Phew	92.00	5
Match 2	Royal Family	"Savage" by Royal Family Dance Crew	86.00	0
Match 3	Jam Republic	"Pretty Fly (For a White Guy)" by The Offspring	78.50	2
Match 3	1Million	"Can We Luv" by 1Million feat. Etham	80.50	3
Round 2
3rd	1Million	"Crush" by Leilani	81.81	
2nd	GRV	"Ocean Drive" by Duke Dumont	95.69	
1st	Brotherhood	"Wish" by Tyga; "All That Matters" by Justin Bieber; "Going Off" by P-Lo	99.50	

=== 2026 season ===
The 2026 Season is the inaugural start of The IDL competitive series.

==== Series 1: New York ====
The 2026 Season kicked off with Series 1 in New York City, USA at the Hammerstein Ballroom on May 2. It was hosted by JustMaiko and Megan Batoon. Amari Marshall, Dr. Arnel Calvario, Arturo Lyons, Chonqiue Sneed, Jamal Sims, and LeTasha Barnes were the judges for this series. Ricky Cole and Clay Boonthanakit were the analysts. Saweetie was the halftime performer for this series.

In the adult Community Division, Naratiiv took first place, followed by The Squad and Day One taking second and third.

New York Series 1 Results
Match	Pro Team	Song	Result	Points
Round 1
Match 1	GRV	"Don't Get Me Started" by Ace Hood	86.51	3
Match 1	Quick Style	"N95" by Kendrick Lamar	87.50	4
Match 2	Brotherhood	"Jealous Type" by Doja Cat	94.51	7
Match 2	1Million	"How It's Done" by Huntrix	87.33	0
Match 3	Jam Republic	"Get Out My Way" by Tedashii feat. Lecrae; "Nothing I Can't Do" by Tedashii feat. Trip Lee and Lecrae	82.49	1
Match 3	Royal Family	"Tuyo" by Royal Family Dance Crew; "Kilometre" by Burna Boy; "Phonk Brasilerio Fresco" by DJ Moigus & DJ FKU	86.67	6
Round 2
3rd	Royal Family	"After Party" by Don Toliver; "Toxic" by Britney Spears	86.25	3
2nd	Quick Style	"Freestyler" by Bomfunk MC's; "Freestyler V3" by Bazu	89.97	5
1st	Brotherhood	"Mannequin" by Pop Smoke; "What's it Gonna Be?!" by Busta Rhymes feat. Janet Jackson; "Uproar" by Lil Wayne feat. Swizz Beatz	99.28	7

==== Series 2: Vancouver ====
Series 2 took place in Vancouver, Canada at the Thunderbird Sports Center on May 23. It was hosted by JustMaiko and Megan Batoon. Cheyenne Kibblewhite, Handy Yacinthe, Stephen Grey, Comfort Fedoke, Carlos Irizarry, and Nicolas Bégin were the judges for this series. Ricky Cole and Clay Boonthanakit were the analysts.

In the adult Community Division, Northside took first place, followed by C-Fam and Nonstop taking second and third.

Vancouver Series 2 Results
Match	Pro Team	Song	Result	Points
Round 1
Match 1	Royal Family	"Nissan Altima" by Doechii; "Mamushi" by Megan Thee Stallion feat. Yuki Chiba; "Lick the Beat" by Parris Goebel	85.84	3
Match 1	1Million	"Kiss Kiss" by Chris Brown feat. T-Pain	87.00	4
Match 2	Quick Style	"Dancing Box" by Modeselktor feat. TTC	84.00	0
Match 2	Jam Republic	"Caught Up" by Usher	88.35	7
Match 3	Brotherhood	"Get Back" by Ludacris; "Outta Your Mind" by Lil Jon ft. LMFAO	93.16	7
Match 3	GRV	"Jealous Type" & "Demons" by Doja Cat	90.17	0
Round 2
3rd	1Million	"Nissan Altima" by Doechii	85.54	3
2nd	Jam Republic	"Love in this Club" by Usher	86.31	5
1st	Brotherhood	"I Want You Back" by NSYNC	93.81	7

==== Series 3: Sydney ====
Series 3 took place in Sydney, Australia at the The Hordern Pavillion on June 20. It was hosted by Ricky Cole. Stephen Grey, Mel Charlot, Comfort Fedoke, Shaun Evaristo, Chonqiue Sneed, and Dr. Arnel Calvario were the judges for this series. Clay Boonthanakit was the analysts.

In the adult Community Division, ID CO took first place, followed by The Home Base and Wan Squad taking second and third.

Sydney Series 3 Results
Match	Pro Team	Song	Result	Points
Round 1
Match 1	Jam Republic	"One Time Comin'" by YG	81.00	0
Match 1	GRV	"One Time Comin'" by YG^{1}	88.83	7
Match 2	Quick Style	"Takedown" by Huntrix	82.00	0
Match 2	1Million	"Poker Face" by Lady Gaga	86.00	7
Match 3	Royal Family	"Stupid Hoe" by Nicki Minaj; "Gyal Like Me" by Parris Goebel; '"Crown Heavy" by Royal Family Dance Crew	88.17	0
Match 3	Brotherhood	"Toxic" by Britney Spears	92.17	7
Round 2
3rd	1Million	"S**BARU" by Shirorou feat. Kasane Teto & Hatsune Miku	89.37	3
2nd	GRV	"Unlock the Swag" & "No Flex Zone" by Rae Sremmurd	90.77	5
1st	Brotherhood	"After Party" by Don Toliver	93.19	7

^Note 1: Although given the chance to change the song by the league, both teams decided to keep the same song for their sets.

==== Series 4: Seoul ====
Series 4 took place in Seoul, South Korea at the Kyung Hee University Grand Peace Palace on August 1. It was hosted by Dulock. Haeni Kim, Amari Marshall, Cheyenne Kibblewhite, Comfort Fedoke, Gina Michael, Dr. Arnel Calvario, and Nicolas Begin were the judges for this series. Clay Boonthanakit was the analysts.

In the adult Community Division, The Stories took first place, followed by UPeepz and Bawz taking second and third.

Seoul Series 4 Results
Match	Pro Team	Song	Result	Points
Round 1
Match 1	GRV	"F*ck Up Some Commas" by Future; "Bugatti" by Ace Hood	84.08	0
Match 1	Royal Family	"Family Ties" by Baby Keem & Kendrick Lamar; "Up!" by Bianca Oblivion; "Demons" by Doja Cat	87.83	7
Match 2	Brotherhood	"Family Ties" by Baby Keem & Kendrick Lamar	87.83	7
Match 2	Quick Style	"Pasta" by Karpe	84.83	0
Match 3	1Million	"Judas" by Lady Gaga	88.25	6
Match 3	Jam Republic	"Family Ties" by Baby Keem & Kendrick Lamar; "Poker Face" by Lady Gaga	85.58	1
Round 2
3rd	Royal Family	"Genius" by Pop Smoke, Lil Tjay, and Swae Lee; "Anaconda" by Nicki Minaj	87.91	3
1st	Brotherhood	"Takedown" by Huntrix; "Get Out My Way" by Tedashii feat. Lecrae	92.25	7
2nd	1Million	"What's Up Danger" by Blackway & Black Caviar	89.84	5

==== Series 5: Los Angeles ====
Series 5 took place in Los Angeles, USA at the Shrine Expo Hall on September 19. It was hosted by Ricky Cole. Chonique Sneed, Mel Charlot, Tessandra Chavez, Brandi Chun, Cheyenne Kibblewhite, Dr. Arnel Calvario, and Stephen Grey were the judges for this series. Clay Boothanakit was the analyst.

In the junior Community Division, Ill Habits took first place, followed by Underscore and Syndikidz taking second and third, respectively.

Los Angeles Series 5 Results
Match	Pro Team	Song	Result	Points
Round 1
Match 1	Quick Style	"Daddy" by Die Antwoord	81.92	0
Match 1	Royal Family	"N95" by Kendrick Lamar; "Whole Lotta Money" by Bia; "Indicator" by Spice	89.08	7
Match 2	Jam Republic	"Promise" by Ciara; "Distraction" by Kehlani	88.08	0
Match 2	Brotherhood	"Bebot" by Black Eyed Peas	92.25	7
Match 3	1Million	"Vroom Vroom" by Charli XCX; " Internet Girl" by Katseye	87.42	3
Match 3	GRV	"Judas"; "Garden of Eden"; "Poker Face" by Lady Gaga	88.75	4
Round 2
2nd	GRV	"N95" by Kendrick Lamar	90.99	5
3rd	Royal Family	"Make It Hurt" by Busta Rhymes; "Bugatti" by Ace Hood	89.25	3
1st	Brotherhood	"SUVs (Black on Black)" by Pooh Shiesty and Jack Harlow; "Clap Back" by Ja Rule; "Down the Road" by C2C	96.70	7

==== Season Series Standings ====
After all 5 normal series have taken place, the points amassed by each team determine their seeding going into the Championship (Series 6).

2026 Season Series Standings
Rank	Pro Team	Representing	NYC	VAN	SYD	SEO	LAX	Total
1	Brotherhood	Vancouver	14	14	14	14	14	70
2	Royal Family	New Zealand	9	3	0	10	10	32
3	1Million	South Korea	0	7	10	11	3	31
4	GRV	Los Angeles	3	0	12	0	9	24
5	Jam Republic	Southeast Asia	1	12	0	1	0	14
6	Quick Style	Oslo	9	0	0	0	0	9

==== Championship (Series 6): Los Angeles ====
The Championship (Series 6) and finale for the 2026 Season took place in Los Angeles, USA at the Shrine Expo Hall on September 20. It determined the "IDL Champion" of 2026 and had no second nor third place. It was hosted by Ricky Cole. Latasha Branes, Shaun Evaristo, Cheyenne Kibblewhite, Handy Yacinthe, Comfort Fedoke, Brandi Chun, Stephen Grey, and Dr. Arnel were the judges for the Championship. The Championship had one extra judge as there will be no fan vote. Clay Boonthanakit will be the analyst.

The matchups were determined by the series standings, being: Brotherhood vs Quick Style, Royal Family vs Jam Republic, and 1Million vs GRV. GRV was crowned the "IDL Champion" of the inaugural 2026 season.

In the adult Community Division, Choreo Cookies took first place, followed by V Mo and Team Athena taking second and third.

Championship Series 6 Results
Match	Seed	Pro Team	Song	Result	Points
Round 1
Match 1	6	Quick Style	"Jealous Type" by Doja Cat	83.00	0
Match 1	1	Brotherhood	"Gangnam Style" by Psy	91.93	7
Match 2	5	Jam Republic	"Gento" & "Dam" by SB19	89.14	5
Match 2	2	Royal Family	"A Girl is a Drug (intro)" by Parris Goebel; "Bubble Pon Di Bed" by Bianca Oblivion & XL Mad; "Church" by T-Pain	88.21	2
Match 3	4	GRV	"Pop" by NSYNC	90.71	6
Match 3	3	1Million	???	89.57	1
Round 2
Jam Republic			"Kilometre" by Burna Boy	90.86	3
GRV			"Kryptonite (I'm on It)" by Purple Ribbon All-Stars; "Promise" by Ciara; "Left, Right" by YG	94.00	7
Brotherhood			"Take on Me" by A-ha; "Backseat Freestyle" by Kendrick Lamar	93.57	5

==== Final Season Standings ====
The final season standings determined the proportion of the $1,000,000 cash prize given to each team. The standings are determined by the season series standings with the added points from the Championship. Brotherhood was crowned as the "IDL 2026 Season Standing Winner".

2026 Final Season Standings
Rank	Pro Team	Representing	Series	Champs	Final	Prize
1	Brotherhood	Vancouver	70	12	82	$200,000
2	GRV	Los Angeles	24	13	37	$180,000
3	Royal Family	New Zealand	32	2	34	$170,000
4	1Million	South Korea	31	1	32	$160,000
5	Jam Republic	Southeast Asia	14	8	22	$150,000
6	Quick Style	Oslo	9	0	9	$140,000

== Criteria and judging ==
=== Judging and scoring ===
The judging criteria consists of ten categories within two parameters: Design and Execution, with each category containing 10 points.

Official Scoresheet
Design (50 Points)
Category	Description
Complexity of Choreography	Level of difficulty implemented through movement such as, but not limited to weight changes, varied intricate movement, isolations, tempo changes, etc.
Staging	Use of varied formations & creative ways to move from one formation to another to allow for quick & seamless transitions. Adequate use of the performance floor.
Musicality	Use of choreography that interprets and responds to instrumentation, rhythmic variations, vocals, and lyrics in the music. Movements should highlight the depth and complexity of the selected track.
Creativity	Original movements, concepts, and transitions that make the routine unique, refreshing, and distinguished from others.
Stylistic Athleticism	Use of choreography that demonstrates high-level athleticism (movements requiring significant strength, power, control, and technical skill) within the context of the styles being used.
Execution (50 Points)
Cleanliness	Consistent unison and timing by the team. Uniformity of team movement within choreography and skills.
Technical Execution + Authenticity	Proper usage and execution of movements that are authentic to the styles from which they originate.
Spacing	Consistent and even positioning of dancers throughout all formations and transitions that provides clarity of intended staging and pictures.
Projection / Communication	Ability to convey a unified message and connect with the audience throughout the performance. Includes: expression, emotion, interaction within the team, energy, and entertainment value.
Stamina	Consistent energy management and execution throughout the entire routine. Athletes maintain the same level of power, control, and commitment from beginning to end.

=== Criteria and Logistics ===
The roster for a team must contain a maximum 30-dancer and minimum 20-dancer roster with each dancer wearing a numbered jersey. Out of the roster, only 20 dancers are able to perform in one series.

Teams must prepare two original performance sets that have not been used before in other previous sets. Teams are free to choose a style of choreography of their choice. It's open-style allows for teams to choose a creative approach on cross-genre dances within the competition of their sets. Majority of styles used take influence from hip-hop dance, street dancing, breakdancing, jazz, dance hall, Afrobeats, Amapiano, waacking, and voguing.

== Broadcast and sponsorship ==
The IDL series are streamed live through Twitch and YouTube through their own channel, with broadcasts including co-streamer collaborations and other media content. On July 27, 2026, ESPN had signed a global rights agreement with The IDL to stream and re-run previous series shows of the 2026 season on their ESPN2 channel.

Sponsor and support from brands was considered to be essential to establish the infrastructure and financial support of the league. Honda is the founding partner and sponsor of the league with The IDL's stage named as the "Honda Stage". E.l.f Cosmetics and Cîroc were also named as sponsors for the 2026 season.
