= World Hip Hop Dance Championship =

Dance competition

World Hip-Hop Dance Championship
- Industry: Dance competition and entertainment
- Genre: Hip-hop
- Founded: 2002
- Founder: Howard and Karen Schwartz
- Headquarters: Los Angeles, California, United States
- Website: hiphopinternational.com

The World Hip Hop Dance Championship is an international hip-hop dance competition created in 2002 by Hip Hop International co-founders Howard and Karen Schwartz, who also created the competitive dance reality television series America's Best Dance Crew. The competition is considered the largest dance competition in the world with more than 50 countries competing each year. The competition has been held since its inception in 2002, except in 2020 due to the COVID-19 pandemic.

The last competition was held on 25 July to 1 August 2026 at the Arizona Grand Resort & Spa in Phoenix, Arizona.

== Format ==
The week-long competition will start with the parade of nations, and will be followed by a series of competitions and elimination rounds over proceeding days. The competition has three rounds: the preliminary round, where all the crews will perform through a random computer drawing conducted by the event organizer, the semi-final round, where the performance order will be based on the reverse order of preliminary round scores, and the final round. However, a decision to conduct a semifinal round is determined by the event organizer.

Every routine is assessed based on performance and skill criteria to achieve the maximum score of 10 points. As to the performance criteria, the judges will reward routines based on creativity, staging, spacing, formations, and level changes, showmanship, style presence and attire, and entertainment value or audience appeal. As to the skill criteria, the judges will evaluate the performance based on musicality, synchronization or timing, execution or controlled mobility and stabilization, difficulty of execution of authentic dance styles, and variety of dance styles, which includes, but not limited to hip hop dance, locking, popping, breaking, whacking, voguing, house dance, party dances or club dances (popular or trendy dances), krumping, stepping/gumboot dance, dancehall, and afro style.

A crew "identifiably performing" three (3) or more dance styles will receive the maximum of one point (1.0) or the full 10%. A crew "identifiably performing" two (2) dance styles will receive a maximum of point 5 (.5). A crew "identifiably performing" one (1) dance style will receive a maximum of point two five (.25). Crews must also be careful not to overshadow or lose the identifying fundamentals, look, presence and authenticity of street/hip hop or risk a deduction.

=== Judging panel ===
A panel of judges will consist of either six (6) persons and a head judge for competitions with 50 crews or less or eight (8) persons plus a head judge for competitions with more than 50 crews. Half of the judges will assess the routine based on the performance criteria and the other half on the skill criteria. In a panel of eight (8) judges, however, the highest and lowest performance and skill scores will be discarded, and the remainder averaged and then totaled for the calculation for the final score. The panel of eight (8) judges also has a deduction judge, whose primary responsibility is to accurately assess the crew and their routine for any infringements of the list of deductions and immediately deduct points for such infringements.

=== Divisions and participation limits ===
The following are the different divisions in the competition, with the required number of members per crew and their age limit:

- Junior division: 5–9 crew members, ages 7–13
- Varsity division: 5–9 crew members, ages 14–17
- Adult division: 5–9 crew members, ages 18 and older
- MiniCrew division: 3 crew members, no age limit
- MegaCrew division: 10–40 crew members, no age limit
- Junior Varsity (JV) MegaCrew division: 10–40 crew members, ages 17 and below

A crew member whose age falls between two age divisions in the competition year (ending 31 December) may compete in either division within that year. For instance, a 12-year-old turning 13 at the end of the year may compete in the Junior or Varsity division. Likewise, an 17-year-old turning 18 within the competition year can compete as a Varsity or Adult.

A crew member may compete in not more than two divisions. Moreover, a crew may not have more than one-third (1/3) of its crew members compete on another crew in the same division, and the crew members in a MegaCrew may not include more than one-third (1/3) of the crew members in a JV MegaCrew competing in the same competition.

=== Defending champions ===
The defending champion is the winning crew from the previous year's championship and may return to defend their title. The defending champion must perform their routine in the semifinal round and receive a score. If there is not a semifinal round, the defending champion will perform in the preliminary round and receive a score.

The final round of the competition will include the crews who qualified in the semi-final round plus the defending champion, if there is one. The defending champion will automatically advance to the final round and will be the last to compete in the performance order regardless of their preliminary or semi-final round score.

=== Penalties ===
The following actions are not allowed during the competition. A crew who will commit any of the following will receive a deduction (usually between 0.05 and 1 point per action) or disqualification, depending on its severity:

- Late start – a crew who fails to appear on stage and strike a starting position within twenty (20) seconds after being introduced.
- Pre-start – a pre-start occurs when prior to taking the start position; the crew demonstrates excessive introductions or displays for longer than ten (10) seconds after all crew members have entered the stage.
- False start – a movement made by one or more crew members prior to the opening signal/beep/start of music that causes the crew to request a restart.
- No show – a crew who fails to appear on the stage and initiate the starting position within sixty (60) seconds after being called.
- Incorrect stage exit – crews must exit from the designated areas only. Jumping or flipping off the stage is prohibited.
- Grandstanding – an excessive post performance display or posing at the end of the routine.
- Lewd gestures – lewd gestures, comments or movements are any body language, vocals or action that exaggerates and or introduces indecent, obscene, vulgar, sexual or offensive content to a routine, including but not limited to crotch grabbing, butt slapping, flipping off, etc.
- Overly dangerous moves – a move that does not clearly belong to any dance style that can result in severe injury to the crew member if not executed well.
- Backstage crossovers – traveling behind the stage to get to the other side of the stage, out of sight of the audience.
- Major fall – either a crew member falls from a lift or support that is unrecoverable, or a crew member falls during the performance that is unrecoverable.
- Minor fall – either a highly noticeable, accidental error during the performance that is recoverable or a crew member stumbles, trips, or falls during the performance that is recoverable.

Other actions may also cause point deductions, such as not adhering to the required routine length, excessive use of cheer, gymnastic, excessive theatrical, cultural, folkloric, or traditional dance elements within the routine or acrobatic moves, inappropriate or not intact attires, use of body oils, paints or other substances applied to the face/body that could affect the performance area and/or create or enhance an excessive theatrical appearance, clothing or props tossed into audience (per occurrence), use of props, among others.

== Winners and podium finishers ==
=== By number of wins and podiums per country ===
The table uses official data provided by Hip Hop International, which excludes the world battles.

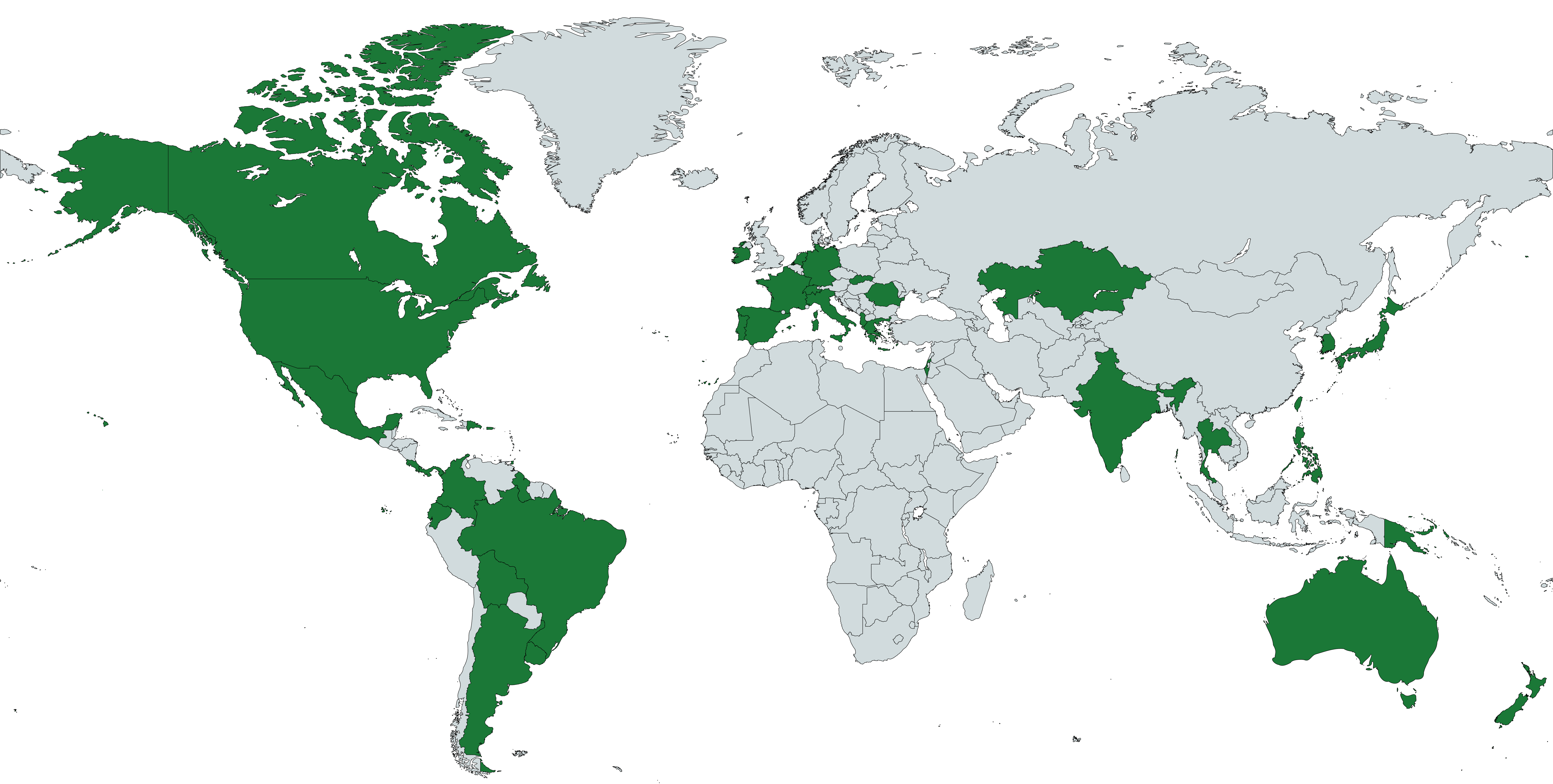
Participating countries in the 2025 World Hip Hop Dance Championship.

The country did not compete in the most recent contest.

| Rank | Name | 1st place, gold medalist(s) | 2nd place, silver medalist(s) | 3rd place, bronze medalist(s) | Total |
|---|---|---|---|---|---|
| 1 | Japan | 18 | 26 | 16 | 60 |
| 2 | Canada | 15 | 9 | 13 | 37 |
| 3 | New Zealand | 13 | 15 | 14 | 42 |
| 4 | Philippines | 13 | 6 | 16 | 35 |
| 5 | United States | 11 | 12 | 10 | 33 |
| 6 | Thailand | 6 | 3 | 2 | 11 |
| 7 | Mexico | 5 | 4 | 4 | 13 |
| 8 | Russia | 5 | 2 | 1 | 8 |
| 9 | France | 3 | 0 | 1 | 4 |
| 9 | United Kingdom | 2 | 0 | 1 | 3 |
| 11 | Argentina | 2 | 0 | 0 | 2 |
| 11 | Papua New Guinea | 2 | 0 | 0 | 2 |
| 13 | Trinidad & Tobago | 1 | 3 | 1 | 5 |
| 14 | South Korea | 1 | 1 | 2 | 4 |
| 15 | Netherlands | 1 | 0 | 1 | 2 |
| 16 | Australia | 0 | 5 | 3 | 8 |
| 16 | Dominican Republic | 0 | 3 | 1 | 4 |
| 18 | Italy | 0 | 2 | 1 | 3 |
| 19 | Spain | 0 | 2 | 0 | 2 |
| 20 | Brazil | 0 | 1 | 1 | 2 |
| 20 | Malaysia | 0 | 1 | 1 | 2 |
| 22 | India | 0 | 0 | 2 | 2 |
| 22 | Ireland | 0 | 0 | 2 | 2 |
| 24 | Singapore | 0 | 0 | 1 | 1 |

=== By division ===
==== Adult division ====
| Year | (gold) Gold | (silver) Silver | (bronze) Bronze |
|---|---|---|---|
| 2002 | (Netherlands) Total Workout Dance Crew | —N/a | |
| 2003 | (Canada) Extreme | (United States) Urban Moves | (United States) CS Allstars |
| 2004 | (Canada) Extreme | (Trinidad and Tobago) Eclectik | (Netherlands) Foundation |
| 2005 | (United Kingdom) Plague | (Trinidad and Tobago) Eclectik | |
| 2006 | (Philippines) Philippine All-Stars | (New Zealand) Dziah | (Trinidad and Tobago) Eclectik |
| 2007 | (Trinidad and Tobago) Eclectik | (United States) Kaba Modern | (Philippines) Philippine All-Stars |
| 2008 | (Philippines) Philippine All-Stars | (Trinidad and Tobago) Eclectik | (United States) Kaba Modern |
| 2009 | (France) R.A.F. Crew | (Mexico) Neutral Zone Adults | (Singapore) Joyce & The Boys |
| 2010 | (New Zealand) ReQuest | (United States) Poreotics | (Canada) Fly Girlz |
| 2011 | (United Kingdom) Plague | (New Zealand) ReQuest | (United States) Instant Noodles |
| 2012 | (Philippines) The Crew | (Mexico) Neutral Zone | (United States) Academy of Villains |
| 2013 | (Canada) Rockwell Family | (New Zealand) Identity | (Malaysia) Elecoldxhot |
| 2014 | (Canada) Brotherhood | (Australia) Zboyz | (Canada) Rockwell Family |
| 2015 | (New Zealand) The Bradas | (Philippines) Romançon | (India) Kings United |
| 2016 | (New Zealand) The Bradas | (United States) Prophecy | (United States) Outlawz |
| 2017 | (United States) S-Rank | Monspace Malaysia All Star | (Australia) The D |
| 2018 | (Argentina) CBAction | (Dominican Republic) Da Republik | (Philippines) The Peepz |
| 2019 | (Russia) Banda ILL | (Thailand) Awesome | (United States) LFG |
| 2021 | (Russia) Banda ILL | (Japan) Woodpecker | (India) The Lions |
| 2022 | (Thailand) Awesome | (Australia) Sweet Feet | (New Zealand) I-Descendant |
| 2023 | (Philippines) HQ | (Australia) Sweet Feet | (New Zealand) I-Descendant |
| 2024 | (Papua New Guinea) Wan Squad | (Philippines) The Peepz | (Philippines) HQ |
| 2025 | (Papua New Guinea) Wan Squad | (Mexico) Bunkers | (Australia) Anonymous |
| 2026 | (Philippines) HQ | (Japan) Woodpecker | (Philippines) Folk Jumpers |

==== Varsity division ====
| Year | (gold) Gold | (silver) Silver | (bronze) Bronze |
|---|---|---|---|
| 2002 | (United States) Wanted Crew | —N/a | |
| 2003 | (United States) Uncutt | (United States) Future Shock | (Italy) Rock Wellness |
| 2004 | (United States) 4 Real | (United States) Future Shock | (Canada) Urban Style |
| 2005 | (United States) Future Shock | (Italy) Hurricanes | (Japan) Kana-Boon! |
| 2006 | (United States) Future Shock | (United States) Hip Hop Connxion Varsity | (Japan) Kana-Boon! |
| 2007 | (Canada) The Unit | (Canada) Irratik | (New Zealand) Fearless |
| 2008 | (New Zealand) Sweet & Sour | (Japan) Kana-Boon! | (New Zealand) FDC Supremacy |
| 2009 | (New Zealand) ReQuest | (Canada) Irratik | (Japan) Kana-Boon! |
| 2010 | (Japan) Zero | (Canada) Illest Vibe | (New Zealand) Sorority |
| 2011 | (New Zealand) Sorority | (Japan) Star Team Varsity | (United States) IDK |
| 2012 | (Japan) Sol-T-Shine | (New Zealand) Sorority | (Japan) J.B. Star Varsity |
| 2013 | (Canada) Brotherhood | (Japan) Sol-T-Shine | (New Zealand) Sorority |
| 2014 | (Japan) J.B. Star Varsity | (New Zealand) Duchesses | (Japan) Sol-T-Shine |
| 2015 | (Japan) Kana-Boon! | (Philippines) Legit Status | (Japan) J.B. Star Varsity |
| 2016 | (Japan) Kana-Boon! | (Japan) J.B. Star Varsity | (Philippines) The Alliance |
| 2017 | (United States) TLxWC | (Japan) Kana-Boon! | (Canada) Flip |
| 2018 | (Japan) Kana-Boon! | (Philippines) Kingsmen | (New Zealand) Masque |
| 2019 | (New Zealand) Swagganauts | (Japan) Kana-Boon! | (New Zealand) Masque |
| 2021 | (Japan) Kana-Boon! | (Canada) Gvrmnt Varsity | (New Zealand) Rebellious |
| 2022 | (Japan) Kana-Boon! | (New Zealand) Swagganauts | (Canada) Alpha Crew |
| 2023 | (Japan) Kana-Boon! | (New Zealand) Swagganauts | (New Zealand) Outkasts |
| 2024 | (Philippines) A-Kidz | (Japan) J.B. Star Varsity | (South Korea) ZN Grow |
| 2025 | (Canada) Gvrmnt Varsity | (Japan) J.B. Star Varsity | (Philippines) VPeepz |
| 2026 | (New Zealand) Swagganauts | (Japan) Kana-Boon! | (Thailand) Gemi9 |

==== Junior division ====
| Year | (gold) Gold | (silver) Silver | (bronze) Bronze |
|---|---|---|---|
| 2002 | (United States) Divas | —N/a | |
| 2003 | (Canada) Groove | (United States) 2 Hot | (United States) Mini Shock |
| 2004 | (Japan) Junction8 | (United States) Mini Shock | (Canada) Groove |
| 2006 | (United States) Mini Shock | (Japan) Next Jr. | (Republic of Ireland) Streets Ahead |
| 2007 | (Canada) Freshh | (Japan) Next Jr. | (Japan) Tom Boy |
| 2008 | (Japan) Next Jr. | (Japan) Sound Energy | (United Kingdom) Jukebox Jnrs |
| 2009 | (United States) Lil' Phunk Boyz | (Japan) Monsoon | (Canada) Freshh |
| 2010 | (Japan) Star Team | (Canada) Freshh 2.0 | (Republic of Ireland) Lil Hustlers |
| 2011 | (New Zealand) Bubblegum | (New Zealand) Lil Saintz | (Japan) Star Team |
| 2012 | (New Zealand) Bubblegum | (Canada) Flip | (Japan) Onizawa Ikka |
| 2013 | (Canada) Flip | (New Zealand) Bubblegum | (Japan) Shinyy-T |
| 2014 | (Canada) Freshh 2.0 | (Japan) Tao | (New Zealand) Bubblegum |
| 2015 | (United States) Chapkidz | (Japan) Next Jr. | (Canada) Youngster |
| 2016 | (Canada) Teenagers | (Russia) Scream | (New Zealand) Bubblegum |
| 2017 | (Russia) Blast | (Canada) Queen BZ | (Japan) Next Jr. |
| 2018 | (Thailand) Awesome Junior | (Japan) Next Jr. | (Canada) Freshh 2.0 |
| 2019 | (Thailand) Awesome Junior | (Japan) Next Jr. | (New Zealand) Lil Saints |
| 2021 | (Russia) Funky Monkey | (Thailand) Awesome Junior | (Japan) Kana Boon! Jr. |
| 2022 | (Thailand) Awesome Junior | (Japan) Next Jr. | (Thailand) I Dass All Your Team |
| 2023 | (Japan) Next Jr. | (Japan) Monsoon | (Japan) J.B. Star |
| 2024 | (Japan) Next Jr. | (Thailand) Awesome Junior | (Canada) Sweet Sisters |
| 2025 | (Japan) Monsoon | (Australia) Kookie Krumblez | (Japan) D-Unit Jr. |
| 2026 | (France) Breakfast | (Japan) Monsoon | (Philippines) Sayawatha Jr. |

==== Megacrew division ====
| Year | (gold) Gold | (silver) Silver | (bronze) Bronze |
|---|---|---|---|
| 2011 | (New Zealand) The Royal Family | (United States) Super Galactic Beat Manipulators | (Canada) Praise Team |
| 2012 | (New Zealand) The Royal Family | (United States) GRV | (Philippines) UP Streetdance Club |
| 2013 | (New Zealand) The Royal Family | (Canada) Praise Team | (Philippines) UP Streetdance Club |
| 2014 | (Philippines) A-Team | (New Zealand) ID Co | (Russia) Flyographers Dance Team |
| 2015 | (South Korea) Lock N Lols | (New Zealand) The Royal Family | (Philippines) A-Team |
| 2016 | (Philippines) UPeepz | (South Korea) Lock N Lols | (New Zealand) Royal Family Varsity |
| 2017 | (Philippines) UPeepz | (Dominican Republic) Da Republik | (Philippines) Legit Status |
| 2018 | (Mexico) The Jukebox | (Philippines) Fusion | (Philippines) Kindred |
| 2019 | (Japan) Kana-Boon! All Star | (Mexico) The Jukebox | (Philippines) Legit Status |
| 2021 | (Russia) Art of Motion | (Japan) J.B. Star | (Japan) Kana-Boon! All Star |
| 2022 | (Canada) DM Nation | (United States) Chapkis Dance Family | (France) Mega Unity |
| 2023 | (Philippines) Legit Status | (Dominican Republic) Da Republik | (Philippines) UP Streetdance Club |
| 2024 | (Philippines) UPeepz | (Italy) Ping Pong Alpha | (Dominican Republic) Da Republik |
| 2025 | (Philippines) Legit Status | (Spain) Entity Dance Family | (Australia) Kookies N Kream |
| 2026 | (Philippines) Femme MNL | (Philippines) The Crew | (Mexico) The Jukebox |

==== Minicrew division ====
| Year | (gold) Gold | (silver) Silver | (bronze) Bronze |
|---|---|---|---|
| 2019 | (Argentina) CBAction | (Spain) Braids | (South Korea) FRZM Movement |
| 2021 | (Mexico) SixOneFour | (Russia) Pioneer Crew | (Japan) Fuki |
| 2022 | (Mexico) Pride Troopers | (Canada) Trixss | (Mexico) SixOneFour |
| 2023 | (France) Phase 3 | (New Zealand) ID3 | (Mexico) Pride Troopers |
| 2024 | (Mexico) SixOneFour | (Japan) Elitz | (Canada) Trixss |
| 2025 | (Mexico) SixOneFour | (Brazil) The Power Music Dance | (Mexico) M.W.A |
| 2026 | (Japan) 1Dub1 | (Japan) Bumpy | (Brazil) The Power Music Dance |

==== Junior varsity megacrew division ====
| Year | (gold) Gold | (silver) Silver | (bronze) Bronze |
|---|---|---|---|
| 2022 | (Thailand) Awesome Junior MegaCrew | (New Zealand) Yung ID | (Canada) Freshh Megacrew |
| 2023 | (Thailand) Awesome Junior MegaCrew | (New Zealand) Yung ID | (United States) Chapkidz |
| 2024 | (Canada) Alpha MegaCrew | (Japan) J.B. Star | (Philippines) A-Kidz |
| 2025 | (Canada) The First Empire | (Australia) The Kookies JV | (Philippines) Legit Status |
| 2026 | (Japan) J.B. Star | (New Zealand) Yung ID | (United States) Chapkidz |

=== Highest points obtained by division ===
The table shows the highest points obtained in each division on a maximum of 10 points.

| Division | Year | Country | Group | Points |
|---|---|---|---|---|
| Adult | 2006 | Philippines | Philippine All-Stars | 9.42 |
| MegaCrew | 2013 | New Zealand | The Royal Family | 9.00 |
| Varsity | 2009 | New Zealand | ReQuest | 8.57 |
| Junior | 2013 | Canada | Flip | 8.55 |
| Junior MegaCrew | 2022 | Thailand | Awesome Junior MegaCrew | 7.97 |
| MiniCrew | 2019 | Argentina | CBAction | 7.59 |

=== World battles ===
==== All styles ====
| Year | Division | Winners | | Ref. |
| Year | Division | Country | Group/Dancer | Ref. |
|---|---|---|---|---|
| 2011 | Solo Dancers | United States | J Boogie | |
| 2012 | Solo Dancers | France | Larry (Les Twins) | |
| 2013 | Solo Dancers | United States | Frank Sinatra | |
| 2014 | 2vs2 | United States | Furious Styles | |
| 2016 | 2vs2 | South Korea | Wacky Rhythm Gate | |
| 2017 | 2vs2 | United States | The Squad FL | |
| 2018 | 2vs2 | United States; Israel | Badnewz + Aladdin | |
| 2019 | 2vs2 | China | Skille + Super Sean | |
| 2022 | 2vs2 | United States | J Noy + The Crown | |
| 2023 | Solo Dancers | France | Bboy Vico | |
| 2024 | Solo Dancers | United States | Staccato | |
| 2025 | Solo Dancers | United States | Beast Boi | |

==== Breaking ====
| Year | Division | Winners | | Ref. |
| Year | Division | Country | Group/Dancer | Ref. |
|---|---|---|---|---|
| 2008 | Adult | United States | Knucklehead Zoo | |
| 2009 | Adult | Philippines | Philippine All-Stars | |
| 2011 | Adult | United States | Fallen Kings | |
| 2012 | Adult | United States | Fallen Kings | |
| 2013 | Adult | United States | Massive Knuckleheads | |
| 2014 | Solo Dancers | United States | The Diss | |
| 2016 | Solo Dancers | China | Bboy Keven | |
| 2017 | Solo Dancers | Russia | Frog | |
| 2018 | Solo Dancers | United States | Conrad | |
| 2019 | Solo Dancers | United States | Moose Mzk | |

==== 1vs1 Locking ====
| Year | Winners | | Ref. |
| Year | Country | Dancer | Ref. |
|---|---|---|---|
| 2008 | Germany | Jo Dance | |
| 2009 | United States | Omar Thomas | |
| 2011 | United States | Tiffany Bong | |
| 2012 | United States | Hurrikane | |
| 2013 | United States | Fire Lock | |
| 2014 | United States | Joe Styles | |
| 2016 | United States | Riot | |
| 2017 | South Korea | Re-Bel | |
| 2018 | United States | Glytch | |
| 2019 | Japan | Natsuna | |

==== 1vs1 Popping ====
| Year | Winners | | Ref. |
| Year | Country | Dancer | Ref. |
|---|---|---|---|
| 2008 | United States | Poppin' John | |
| 2009 | France | Marie Poppins | |
| 2011 | United States | Bionic | |
| 2012 | United States | Big Heart Break | |
| 2013 | United States | Kid Boogie | |
| 2014 | United States | Slim Boogie | |
| 2016 | Switzerland | Poppin C | |
| 2017 | Canada | Monsta Pop | |
| 2018 | Japan | Madoka Suzuki | |
| 2019 | China | Sean | |

==== 1vs1 Waacking ====
| Year | Winners | | Ref. |
| Year | Country | Dancer | Ref. |
|---|---|---|---|
| 2019 | Netherlands | Shahin | |
