= World of Street Woman Fighter =

2025 South Korean reality dance series

- Season 3
- Native name
- Hangul: 월드 오브 스트릿 우먼 파이터
- RR: Woldeu obeu seuteurit umeon paiteo
- MR: Wŏldŭ obŭ sŭt'ŭrit umŏn p'ait'ŏ
- Starring: see Contestants
- Presented by: Sung Han-bin
- Judges: J.Y. Park; Mike Song; Aliya Janell
- No. of teams: 6
- Winner: Osaka Ojo Gang (Note: Members: Ibuki, Kyoka, Ruu, Junna, Hana, Minami, Uwa)
- No. of episodes: 9

Release
- Original network: Mnet
- Original release: May 27 – July 22, 2025

Season chronology
- ← Previous; Stage Fighter Next → Street World Fighter: Director's War

World of Street Woman Fighter (Korean: 월드 오브 스트릿 우먼 파이터; abbreviated as WSWF) is the fifth overall season of the Mnet South Korean dance competition franchise and third season of Street Woman Fighter. An international dance competition that highlights the pride of powerful women around. It premiered on Mnet on May 27, 2025, and airs every Tuesday at 22:00 (KST).

== Cast ==
The program is presented by Sung Han-bin.

The judges of this season are:

- J.Y. Park (Note: Did not appear in Episodes 4 and 5 due to scheduling conflicts)
- Mike Song

In addition to the two main dance judges, there are special judges for each mission:

- Aliya Janell (No Respect World Battle Mission, Class Mission)
- Back Koo-young (1Million) (First Elimination Battle, Mega Crew)
- Babysleek (former Wolf'Lo member) (First Elimination Battle)
- Ashley Everett (World K-Pop Mission, First Elimination Battle)
- Kazukiyo (First Elimination Battle)
- Lia Kim (1Million) (Mega Crew, Semi-final Elimination Battle)
- Phil Wizard (2024 Summer Olympics Breaking Gold Medalist) (Second Elimination Battle)
- Yoonji (Mannequeen) (Second Elimination Battle)
- O-Shima (Second Elimination Battle)
- Saweetie (Global Artist Performance Mission, Finals)
- Poppin C (Semi-final Elimination Battle)
- Kite (Semi-final Elimination Battle)
- Bada Lee (Team Bebe) (World Finale with JYP Mission)
- Vata (WeDemBoyz) (World Finale with JYP Mission)

== Contestants ==
Color and Font key:

- Leader
- ~~Strikethrough~~ denotes that the contestant had withdrew from her crew.
- Italic denotes that the contestant had already participated from the previous seasons.

List of World of Street Woman Fighter contestants
Crew	Country/City	Members	Birthday	Notes
Ag Squad	Australia	Kaea	June 21, 1997	Former Member of The Royal Family & ReQuest Dance Crew. Backup Dancers for Justin Bieber, Jennifer Lopez & Enrique Iglesias
Ag Squad	Australia	Kyra	August 26, 1997	Co-captain of De Ja Vu Crew. Former Member of The Royal Family & ReQuest Dance Crew. Backup Dancer for Jennifer Lopez
Ag Squad	Australia	Danica	January 20, 1998	Member of Girl Group Pink Matter based in Brisbane
Ag Squad	Australia	Alysha	March 24, 2000	Backup Dancer for Katseye, XG, 50 Cent, T-Pain
Ag Squad	Australia	Ruthy Baby	October 4, 2000	Former Member of Bubblegum Crew from The Palace Dance Studio, The Royal Family & ReQuest Dance Crew. Backup Dancers for Justin Bieber, PSY & Ciara
Ag Squad	Australia	Vanessa	August 4, 2003	Backup Dancer for Kiana Lede
Ag Squad	Australia	Kaleece	April 19, 2004	Former Member of The Rascals Crew & The Royal Family
Ag Squad	Australia	Aaliyah	December 27, 2006	Backup Dancer for Ne-Yo. Appeared in Olivia Marsh's "Strategy" Music Video.
Bumsup	Korea	Honey J	August 26, 1987	Leader of HolyBang from Street Woman Fighter. Former leader of PURPLOW dance crew. choreographer and backup dancer for Jay Park and all artist from AOMG.
Bumsup	Korea	Monika	June 22, 1986	Leader of PROWDMON from Street Woman Fighter and one of the judges for Street Woman Fighter 2. The Dance Professor for most of the contestants during their college years. Co-owner of OFD Studio. Choreographer for Amoeba Culture. Former member of WooFam. One half of the dance duo MOLIP with fellow PROWDMON member Lip J., Performance Director on Mnet's I-Land 2: N/a. She initially appeared in episodes 1 to 6 as a spectator due to her 7-month pregnancy, and made her performance debut in Episode 7.
Bumsup	Korea	Lip J (Note: Lip J, PROWDMON's sub-leader, took Monika's place while the latter is on her 7-month pregnancy.)	July 30, 1988	Member of PROWDMON along with Monika from Street Woman Fighter. World-renowned Waacking dancer. Co-owner of OFD Studio. Choreographer for Amoeba Culture, Yubin, and Lee Hi. Member of dance duo MOLIP (with PROWDMON member Monika), ElizaBitch, and Team W.O.W. (World Of Waackers). Mentor on Mnet's Boys Planet
Bumsup	Korea	Aiki	September 7, 1989	Leader of Hook from Street Woman Fighter. World of Dance Contestant, Choreographer of Refund Sisters, Bibi, Queen Wassabii, and Moonbyul. Mentor of MBC's My Teenage Girl.
Bumsup	Korea	Ri.hey	April 17, 1990	Leader of CocaNButter from Street Woman Fighter. Former member of PURPLOW Dance crew. Choreographer at Bangall Dance Academy
Bumsup	Korea	Hyojin Choi	January 20, 1992	Leader of Want from Street Woman Fighter. Former Choreographer at 1Million Dance Studio
Bumsup	Korea	Gabee (Note: Only participated in Episodes 1-6 due to prior scheduling commitments.)	November 3, 1993	Leader of Lachica from Street Woman Fighter. Choreographer for BoA, Yubin, Chungha, CLC, TWICE, Natty. Formerly known as "Single Lady" during her underground dance battle days.
Bumsup	Korea	No:ze	February 12, 1996	Leader of WayB from Street Woman Fighter. Backup Dancer for Kai, Taemin, Key & SHINee
Bumsup	Korea	Leejung	August 9, 1998	Leader of YGX from Street Woman Fighter. Choreographer for TWICE, ITZY, Sunmi, Somi, BLACKPINK, and iKON. Former member of Just Jerk Crew. Member of YGX's NWX crew. Performance Director on Mnet's I-Land 2: N/a.
Bumsup	Korea	Hyeily (Note: Hyeily replaced Hyojin Choi in the Rookie Class mission video as the fellow contestant Hyojin Choi cannot appear in two class videos at the same time.)	May 5, 1999	Member of PROWDMON from Street Woman Fighter. Choreographer at OFD Studio. Participated in the Rookie class mission music video as Bumsup member Hyojin Choi is unable to participate in two class videos at the same time.
Motiv	USA	Marlee	December 2, 1999	Contestant on America's Got Talent as part of the hip-hop crew Studio One Young Beast Society & World of Dance Season 3 Under the Motiv Dance Crew., co-founder of the Motiv Dance Studio in Orlando, Florida. Choreographer for Jazmine Sullivan and Backup Dancer for Pharrell Williams & Janet Jackson
Motiv	USA	Fantaye	December 28, 1997	Member of VMo and LFG dance crews. Contestant on World of Dance Season 3
Motiv	USA	Bella	October 23, 2000	
Motiv	USA	Kaidi	August 14, 2001	Dancer signed under XCEL Talent Agency.
Motiv	USA	Nyssa	February 15, 2003	
Motiv	USA	Logistx	May 8, 2003	Red Bull B-Girl Athlete. Won the Silverback Open B-Girl tournament in Philadelphia, the Junior 7 to Smoke breaking competition in Singapore the Red Bull BCOne World Final, becoming the youngest and first American woman to claim the title. Receive a bronze medal at the WDSF Pan American Championship. represented the United States in a breaking dance tournament at the 2024 Summer Olympics in Paris, France. opened a dance studio in South Florida to specialized on Break dancing.
Motiv	USA	Abby	October 10, 2006	Dancer and DJ. Performed in various music festivals across Mexico.
Osaka Ojo Gang	Osaka, Japan	Ibuki	October 11, 1996	World-renowned waaacking dancer who won several international competitions abroad. Participated in Street Dance of China season 3 and 4 as a contestant, and in season 6 as a mentor. One half of the waacking duo Bad Queens.
Osaka Ojo Gang	Osaka, Japan	Ruu	February 5, 1992	Member of Fabulous Sisters Crew. Her team won the 2016 and 2017 World of Dance competition. Owner of Vivid Tokyo Dance Studio
Osaka Ojo Gang	Osaka, Japan	Hana	November 1, 1994	Older sister of Twice's Momo
Osaka Ojo Gang	Osaka, Japan	Kyoka	April 24, 1996	Red Bull Athlete. Hip-hop dancer. One half of the hip-hop duo RUSHBALL.
Osaka Ojo Gang	Osaka, Japan	~~Renan~~	January 15, 1997	Dancer for aespa, Young Posse, Enhypen, STAYC, Illit, XG, and Kepler. She withdrew from the crew due to a car accident.
Osaka Ojo Gang	Osaka, Japan	Junna	November 3, 1998	Dancer signed under Jam Republic's agency.
Osaka Ojo Gang	Osaka, Japan	Minami	April 23, 1999	Member of the Kadokawa Dreams who won the 2022–23 and 2023-24 D.League dance league.
Osaka Ojo Gang	Osaka, Japan	Uwa	May 10, 2004	Former Member of Moonchild, Former i-CONZ ~ Dream for Children Contestant
RHTokyo	Tokyo, Japan	Rie Hata	August 9, 1990	Referred to as "Queen of Swag,". Choreographer for Numerous artist including BTS, Twice, NCT, Exo, Red Velvet, BoA, G-Dragon, Stray Kids, Ateez, Exile, Generations from Exile Tribe, Nissy, KAT-TUN, Sandaime J Soul Brothers, Chris Brown, and Omarion. Founded the dance team RIEHATATOKYO (abbr. RHTokyo), leads the dance crew avex ROYALBRATS, which won the inaugural championship in Japan's professional dance league, D. LEAGUE, owns and operates her fashion brand, Qoffee Shop.
RHTokyo	Tokyo, Japan	Mona	July 12, 1994	
RHTokyo	Tokyo, Japan	Rena	September 18, 1999	Member of Tsubakill from Street Woman Fighter 2 and avex ROYALBRATS. Choreographer for Class:y & Illit. Back-up dancer for CL and Zico
RHTokyo	Tokyo, Japan	Asuka	October 15, 1999	
RHTokyo	Tokyo, Japan	Nina Neves	March 25, 2000	Japanese-Brazilian dancer.
RHTokyo	Tokyo, Japan	Rico Hirai	April 2, 2001	
RHTokyo	Tokyo, Japan	ReiNa	May 16, 2001	Choreographer and Backup dancer for NCT, Stray Kids, Noa, Snow Man, Ateez, Be:First, and HANA. Also a member of Criminalz Crew
RHTokyo	Tokyo, Japan	Ako	August 28, 2002	
Royal Family	New Zealand	Teesha	June 30, 2002	Member of ReQuest Dance Crew
Royal Family	New Zealand	Harmz	July 15, 2000	Member of ReQuest Dance Crew. Dancer for Rihanna, Jennifer Lopez, Izzy Lareina.
Royal Family	New Zealand	Zari	June 14, 2002	Member of ReQuest Dance Crew
Royal Family	New Zealand	Isla	January 8, 2003	Member of ReQuest Dance Crew
Royal Family	New Zealand	Maiya	December 11, 2004	Member of ReQuest Dance Crew
Royal Family	New Zealand	Moana	January 12, 2005	Member of ReQuest Dance Crew
Royal Family	New Zealand	Tiare	June 7, 2005	Member of ReQuest Dance Crew
Royal Family	New Zealand	Kylie	October 16, 2006	Member of ReQuest Dance Crew

== Mission ==
=== Mission 1: "No Respect World Battle Mission" ===
Each dancer points out a dancer from an opposing team that they can beat in a one-on-one dance battle. The chosen dancer is given a "No Respect" sticker for each time they are chosen.

Rules for the dance battles
- The named dancer points out a dancer they consider to be the weakest, and engages in a one-on-one dance battle for 40 seconds each.
- The named dancer goes first while the pointed out dancer goes second.
- At the end of the battle, the Fight Judges will determine the winner.
- Fight Judges can request a rematch when no winner can be decided. A rematch will take place if two or more judges cannot decide a winner or in the case of a 1:1 tie and the third judge cannot choose a winner. In the rematch, both dancers dance at the same time for 40 seconds.
- The winning dancer gives a NO RESPECT sticker of their respective crew color to the losing team, which is stuck on their crew fist.
- In the Team Relay Battles, the number of no respect stickers will double on their winning or losing record.
- The team with the most losses are labeled as the NO RESPECT Crew.

"No Respect" stickers
Crew	Name	No. of stickers	Total
**Ag Squad**	Kaea	1	5 stickers
**Ag Squad**	Ruthy Baby	1	5 stickers
**Ag Squad**	Danica	1	5 stickers
**Ag Squad**	Kaleece	1	5 stickers
**Ag Squad**	Aaliyah	1	5 stickers
**Bumsup**	Honey J	1	12 stickers
**Bumsup**	Lip J	2	12 stickers
**Bumsup**	Aiki	5	12 stickers
**Bumsup**	Hyojin Choi	2	12 stickers
**Bumsup**	Gabee	1	12 stickers
**Bumsup**	Leejung	1	12 stickers
**Motiv**	Marlee	1	6 stickers
**Motiv**	Logistx	1	6 stickers
**Motiv**	Fantaye	1	6 stickers
**Motiv**	Bella	2	6 stickers
**Motiv**	Kaidi	1	6 stickers
**Osaka Ojo Gang**	Ibuki	1	3 stickers
**Osaka Ojo Gang**	Kyoka	1	3 stickers
**Osaka Ojo Gang**	Minami	1	3 stickers
**RHTokyo**	Rie Hata	3	8 stickers
**RHTokyo**	Reina	1	8 stickers
**RHTokyo**	Rena	2	8 stickers
**RHTokyo**	Nina Neves	2	8 stickers
**Royal Family**	Teesha	3	13 stickers
**Royal Family**	Isla	3	13 stickers
**Royal Family**	Moana	2	13 stickers
**Royal Family**	Zari	1	13 stickers
**Royal Family**	Maiya	1	13 stickers
**Royal Family**	Harmz	1	13 stickers
**Royal Family**	Tiare	1	13 stickers
**Royal Family**	Kylie	1	13 stickers
47 No Respect Stickers			**Total stickers**

No Respect, Battle of the Weakest battles from ep. 1–2
Round	Team	Contestant	Votes
1	Bumsup	Honey J	0
1	Motiv	Marlee	3
2	AG Squad	Aaliyah	3
2	Bumsup	Aiki	0
3	Osaka Ojo Gang	Kyoka	0
3	RHTokyo	Riehata	3
4	Royal Family	Teesha	2
4	AG Squad	Kaea	1
5	Royal Family	Moana	2
5	AG Squad	Ruthy Baby	1
6	Royal Family	Harmz	2
6	Bumsup	Hyojin Choi	1
7	Royal Family	Kylie	2
7	AG Squad	Kaleece	1
8 (Note: Tied at first battle)	Bumsup	Gabee	2
8	AG Squad	Danica	1
9	Osaka Ojo Gang	Ibuki	0
9	Bumsup	Lip J	3
10 (Note: Only the second battle was aired.)	Motiv	Logistx	2
10	Bumsup	Lip J	1
11	Osaka Ojo Gang	Kyoka, Ibuki	1
11	RHTokyo	Reina, Rena	2
12	Bumsup	Hyojin Choi, Aiki, No:ze, Lip J	3
12	AG Squad	Danica, Vanessa, Alysha, Aaliyah	0

No Respect, Unaired battles from ep. 1–2
Round	Team	Contestant	Votes
1	RHTokyo	Rico Hirai	2
1	Motiv	Fantaye	1
2	Motiv	Bella	Unrevealed
2	Royal Family	Isla	Unrevealed
3	Motiv	Marlee, Fantaye, Logistx	3
3	Bumsup	Aiki, Lee Jung, Gabee, Hyojin Choi	0
4	Bumsup	Ri.hey	Unrevealed
4	Osaka Ojo Gang	Kyoka	Unrevealed
5	Motiv	Fantaye	Unrevealed
5	RHTokyo	Reina	Unrevealed

Ranking
Rank	Crew	Wins	Losses
1	RHTokyo	9	2
2	Motiv	6	2
3	Osaka Ojo Gang	1	5
4	Royal Family	4	6
4	Ag Squad	4	6
6	Bumsup	6	9

=== Mission 2: "Class Mission" ===
Each crew leader chooses seven members including themselves to be split into three ranks. (Note: 7 is the minimum number of dancers in a crew. However, some of the members have to perform in two missions. Additionally some members were unable to participate for various reasons. AG Squad's Danica (team selection), Bumsup's Gabee and Rihey (injury), RHTokyo's Ako (team selection), and Royal Family's Tiare (team selection) were unable to participate.) Each rank will work together to create a dance video. Each rank will only have one main dancer which will be chosen by the judges. The rest will be back-up dancers in the video. Each dancer in a rank will create a short choreography which will be voted on by the members of their rank. The chosen choreography will be the one used to determine the main dancer.

Main dancer's benefits
- In charge of the center position, choreography, and directing the video for their rank.
- Receive 100 points for their crew.
- Will choose the "worst dancer" in their rank and they will battle it out to which of their teams will receive the "worst dancer" points.

Color key:

- Main dancer(s)
- Worst dancer
- **Bold** denotes chosen choreographer

Class mission
Class	Team	Contestant	Song selection
Leader Class	Ag Squad	Kaea	"ECHO!" by Seventeen-HxW
Leader Class	Bumsup	Honey J	"ECHO!" by Seventeen-HxW
Leader Class	Motiv	Marlee	"ECHO!" by Seventeen-HxW
Leader Class	Osaka Ojo Gang	Ibuki	"ECHO!" by Seventeen-HxW
Leader Class	RHTokyo	**Riehata**	"ECHO!" by Seventeen-HxW
Leader Class	Royal Family	Teesha	"ECHO!" by Seventeen-HxW
Middle Class	Ag Squad	**Ruthy Baby, Kyra, Alysha, & Kaleece**	"Ridin'" by NMIXX's Lily, Jiwoo, & Kyujin
Middle Class	Bumsup	Aiki, Hyojin Choi, No:ze, & Leejung	"Ridin'" by NMIXX's Lily, Jiwoo, & Kyujin
Middle Class	Motiv	Fantaye, Bella, Nyssa, & Logistx	"Ridin'" by NMIXX's Lily, Jiwoo, & Kyujin
Middle Class	Osaka Ojo Gang	Kyoka, Ruu, Hana, & Minami	"Ridin'" by NMIXX's Lily, Jiwoo, & Kyujin
Middle Class	RHTokyo	Mona, Rena, Asuka, & Nina Neves	"Ridin'" by NMIXX's Lily, Jiwoo, & Kyujin
Middle Class	Royal Family	Zari, Harmz, Isla, & Moana	"Ridin'" by NMIXX's Lily, Jiwoo, & Kyujin
Rookie Class	Ag Squad	Vanessa & Aaliyah	"Flip Flop" by Gummy & Since
Rookie Class	Bumsup	**Lip J & Hyojin Choi/Hyeily (Note: Prowdmon's Hyeily replaced Hyojin Choi in the Rookie Class music video as the latter cannot join two class videos at the same time.)**	"Flip Flop" by Gummy & Since
Rookie Class	Motiv	Kaidi & Abby	"Flip Flop" by Gummy & Since
Rookie Class	Osaka Ojo Gang	Junna & Uwa	"Flip Flop" by Gummy & Since
Rookie Class	RHTokyo	ReiNa & Rico Hirai	"Flip Flop" by Gummy & Since
Rookie Class	Royal Family	Maiya & Kylie	"Flip Flop" by Gummy & Since

Class mission points
Crew	Main Dancer Points	Worse Dancer Points	Total	Notes
RHTokyo	+100	-	100	Director's Choice for Rookie Class
AG Squad	+100	-50	50	-
Royal Family	+100	-50	50	-
Motiv	-	-	0	Director's Choice for Leader Class
Osaka Ojo Gang	-	-	0	Director's Choice for Middle Class
Bumsup	-	-50	-50	-

=== Mission 3: "World of K-Pop Mission" ===
Using the same song by G-Dragon, Aespa, and Jennie, two crews compete against one another. Each crew is required to increase the number of views and likes on their video; the crew with the most views and likes wins this mission. (Note: The winner of World of K-Pop Mission will be announced on June 17, 2025, when the episode aired.)

Scoring system
- Global Popular Vote Score: Voting period from March 25 to 29, 2025, at 18:00 PM KST. Score calculated as Views + Likes X 100. (Note: Videos were posted on YouTube by Mnet on TheChoom on March 25)

Color key:

- Winner

Mission Global Public Evaluation
Crew	Song selection	Scores			
Crew	Song selection	Class Mission Result	Judge's score	Global Public vote	Total
Ag Squad	Armageddon + Drama + Whiplash by aespa	+50	291	900	1241
Royal Family	Armageddon + Drama + Whiplash by aespa	+50	286	700	1036
Motiv	Good Boy with Taeyang + Home Sweet Home featuring Taeyang & Daesung + Power by G-Dragon	0	281	600	881
Osaka Ojo Gang	Good Boy with Taeyang + Home Sweet Home featuring Taeyang & Daesung + Power by G-Dragon	0	281	500	781
RHTokyo	ExtraL featuring Doechii + Mantra + Like Jennie by Jennie	+100	285	800	1185
Bumsup	ExtraL featuring Doechii + Mantra + Like Jennie by Jennie	-50	282	1000	1232

The losing crews RHTokyo, Royal Family, and Osaka Ojo Gang were chosen candidates for elimination. As the 2 crews with the lowest points, Osaka Ojo Gang and Royal Family were announced as the crews competing in the first elimination round.

Rules of the elimination battle
- Best of 5 :
  - Round 1 – Crew
  - Round 2 – Ace Battle
  - Round 3 – Relay Team Battle (the crew will randomly select member(s) to compete depending on what music the DJ will play)
  - Round 4 – Relay Team Battle 2 (if necessary)
  - Round 5 – Leader (if necessary)
- At the end of each round, the Fight Judges determine the winner.
- The first crew to win three rounds is safe from elimination, while the losing crew is eliminated.

First elimination battle
Round	Contestant				Winning team
Round	Osaka Ojo Gang	Score	Royal Family	Score	Winning team
1	Crew	5	Crew	0	**Osaka Ojo Gang**
2	Kyoka	5	Moana	0	**Osaka Ojo Gang**
3	Kyoka & Minami; Ibuki; Minami	1	Isla & Teesha; Harmz; Zari	4	**Royal Family**
4	Junna & Uwa; Kyoka; Uwa	1	Tiare & Maiya; Isla; Moana	4	**Royal Family**
5	Ibuki	5	Teesha	0	**Osaka Ojo Gang**

=== Mission 4: "Mega Crew Mission" ===
The remaining 5 crews competed in the Mega Crew mission where each crew returned to their home country to create a performance that showcased their country's color within a chosen theme to be performed by a minimum of 30 performers. Crews personally recruited their mega crew performers. Each performance was directed by the crew's leader. (Note: Osaka Ojo Gang's Ibuki and Ruu will be co-directors for their mega crew mission performance. Additionally, te2ta from NEiGHBOR FLOW will serve as co-director and Creative director for RHTokyo.) This mission included a high angle challenge where each crew had to shoot a 20-second high angle section as part of their overall mega crew mission performance.

Scoring system
- Global Popular Vote Score: Voting period from June 18, 2025, at 01:00 AM KST to June 22, 2025, at 6:00 PM KST. (Note: Videos were posted on YouTube by Mnet on The Choom channel on June 18, 2025.) Score calculated as Views + Likes X 100. Crews are ranked from this score and awarded points starting at 600 points for the highest score.
- Fight Judges' Score: Each judge awards up to 400 points to each three directors of each crew totaling up to 1200 points.

"Mega Crew" mission
Crew	Crew size (Note: Including WSWF participants)	Theme	Director(s)	Scores			Rank	
Crew	Crew size	Theme	Director(s)	Fight judges	Public vote	Total	Rank	
**Ag Squad**	143 (Note: Featuring dancers from Identity Dance Company)	Outback (Aussie) - Southern; Hemisphere's; AG Squad (아웃백 (오지): 남반구의; 에이지 스쿼드)	Kaea	960	900	1,860	Rank	**5th**
**Motiv**	47 (Note: Including "World Hip Hop Dance" world champion David "The Crown" Stalter Jr., and Indonesian dancer Miyu)	We The People (위 더 피플)	Marlee	1,160	1,000	2,160	**2nd**	
**Osaka Ojo Gang**	108 (Note: Including Twice members Nayeon, Jeongyeon, Momo, Sana, and Jihyo)	OSAKA OJO (Lady) Spirit (OSAKA 오죠 (아가씨) 정신)	Ibuki; Ruu	1,005	1,100	2,105	**3rd**	
**Bumsup**	102 (Note: Including Bebe's Bada Lee, Prime Kingz's Knucks, BankTwoBrothers' RKLS, Coca N' Butter members Gaga, Z-Sun, and Bicki, Prowdmon's Kayday, WIN.G, KAME, T.one, and Ham.G, BeMbitious contestant Cha Hyunseung, Holy Bang, HOOK, and Roh Yoon-seo.) (Note: Gabee did not participate due to prior scheduling commitments.)	Dreamscape - At the Edge of Dreams (몽경(夢境) – 꿈의 경계에서)	Honey J	1,195	1,200	2,395	**1st**	
**RHTokyo**	144 (Note: Including KAITA from RHTokyo and dancers from SOTA)	Awesome! Tokyo! Japanese! (멋지다! 도코! 일본인!)	Rie Hata te2ta of NEiGHBOR FLOW (Note: Served as co-director and creative director. Not part of mega crew performers)	1,065	800	1,865	**4th**	

At the end of the Mega Crew mission, the two crews with the lowest total points competed in the second elimination battle.

Rules of the second elimination battle
- Best of 5:
  - Round 1 – Crew Battle
  - Round 2 – 2v2
  - Round 3 – Aces Battle
  - Round 4 – 2v2 (if Necessary)
  - Round 5 – Leader (if Necessary)
- At the end of each round, the Fight Judges determine the winner.
- The first crew to win three rounds will advance to the next round, while the losing crew is eliminated.

Second elimination battle
Round	Contestant				Winning team
Round	Ag Squad	Score	RHTokyo (Note: Rie Hata was unable to compete due to injury. Reina served as their crew leader.)	Score	Winning team
1	Crew	5	Crew	0	**Ag Squad**
2	Kaea & Ruthy	3	Rico Hirai & Asuka	2	**Ag Squad**
3	Danica	0	Reina	5	**RHTokyo**
4	Vanessa & Aaliyah	4	Ako & Reina	1	**Ag Squad**

=== Mission 5: "Global Artist Performance Mission" ===
Each crew created a new choreography for Saweetie's new single "Shake It Fast".

Scoring system
- The voting period was from July 1, 2025, 12:00 AM KST to July 5, 2025, 18:00 KST. Voting was based on the number of Views + YouTube likes (x 100) of the crew video on THE CHOOM YouTube channel.
- Promotional and manipulated view counts will not be included.

"Global Artist Performance Mission"
Crew	Main Dancer	Scores		
Crew	Main Dancer	Number of YouTube Views	Number of YouTube Likes	Saweetie Pick
**Ag Squad**	Aaliyah	2,451,780	372,865	+100
**Bumsup (Note: Gabee did not participate due to prior scheduling commitments and was replaced by Monika.)**	Leejung	2,800,141	357,079	0
**Motiv**	Kaidi	1,462,376	203,929	0
**Osaka Ojo Gang**	Minami	2,673,866	369,768	0

=== Mission 6: "Dance Film Mission" ===
Scoring system
- Global Popular Vote Score: Voting period from June 25, 2025, at 12:30 AM KST to June 27, 2025, at 12:00 PM KST.[l] Score calculated as number of "Likes" X 100.
- Video campaign promotions and other videos are not included.

"Dance Film Mission"
Crew	Theme	Scores			
Crew	Theme	Number of YouTube views	Number of YouTube likes	Main Section Choreography pick	Final Score
**Ag Squad**	Woman	1,507,967	209,786	+100	22,486,567
**Bumsup** (Note: Gabee did not participate due to prior scheduling commitments.)	Woman	2,439,599	240,231	-	26,462,899
**Motiv**	Woman	996,826	102,873	-	11,284,126
**Osaka Ojo Gang**	Woman	2,588,247	330,805	-	35,668,747

Rank	Crew	Score Breakdown			Total Score (1,200)
Rank	Crew	"Saweetie's Choreography" Mission (100)	"Dance Film" Mission (100)	Views + Likes (1000)	Total Score (1,200)
**1st**	**AG Squad**	100	100	1000	**1,200**
**2nd**	**Osaka Ojo Gang**	0	0	900	**900**
**3rd**	**Bumsup**	0	0	800	**800**
**4th**	**Motiv**	0	0	700	**700**

At the end of both the Global Dance Performance Mission and Dance Film Mission, the two crews with the lowest scores on both rounds will be compete in the semi-final elimination round.

Rules of the semi-final elimination battle
- Best of 5:
  - Round 1 – Crew Battle
  - Round 2 – 2v2
  - Round 3 – Ace
  - Round 4 – 2v2 (if Necessary)
  - Round 5 – 1v1 (if Necessary)
- At the end of each round, the Fight Judges determine the winner.
- The first crew to win three rounds will advance to the next round, while the losing crew is eliminated.

Semi-final elimination battle
Round	Contestant				Winning team
Round	Bumsup	Score	Motiv	Score	Winning team
1	Crew	0	Crew	5	**Motiv**
2	Honey J & Rihey	5	Marlee & Bella	0	**Bumsup**
3	Lip J	3	Logistx	2	**Bumsup**
4	Aiki & Lip J	0	Nyssa & Bella	5	**Motiv**
5	Rihey	1	Marlee	4	**Motiv**

=== Mission 7: "Original "SWF" Theme Mission - Must Have Scene" ===
The 3 finalist crews will perform their original theme song arranged by them with a scene that will impress the audience.

Scoring system
- Preliminary vote score (30%) - The crew with the highest score received 300 points, then 2nd to 3rd place crews had 10 points deducted per rank.
- Live Global Online Voting (70%) - The crew with the highest score received 700 points, then 2nd to 3rd place crews had 50 points deducted per rank. Voting was done via SMS (limited within South Korea only) and via MNet Plus app. Voting period is from the beginning of the show until the announcement of winners.
- Additional points in the finale stage - 50 points
- Global Popular Vote Score: Voting period from July 15, 2025, at 12:00 AM KST to July 20, 2025, at 18:00 PM KST. Score calculated as number of "Likes" X 100.
- Video campaign promotions and other videos are not included.

Original "SWF" Theme Mission - Must Have Scene
Crew	Song selection
**Ag Squad**	"Sass (The Hub Remix)" by Izna
**Motiv**	"Always a Good Time" (The HUB Remix) by Ash Island
**Osaka Ojo Gang**	"Champion" (The HUB Remix) by Sung Han-bin (Zerobaseone)

=== Mission 8: "Crew Identity Mission" ===
The 3 finalist crews will have a performance to show the world the crew's identity with each crew member's unique color, style, and identity.

Scoring system
- Preliminary vote score (30%) - The crew with the highest score received 300 points, then 2nd to 3rd place crews had 10 points deducted per rank.
- Live Global Online Voting (70%) - The crew with the highest score received 700 points, then 2nd to 3rd place crews had 50 points deducted per rank. Voting was done via SMS (limited within South Korea only) and via MNet Plus app. Voting period is from the beginning of the show until the announcement of winners.
- Additional points in the finale stage - 50 points

=== Mission 9: "World Finale with JYP Mission" ===
The 3 finalist crews will each create a choreographed performance for JYP's new single "Gatsby". The crew whose choreography was chosen will receive 50 additional points to their finale score, will have the benefit of directing the live finale permission with JYP and the other two crews, and will serve as the main dancers.

Scoring system
- Preliminary vote score (30%) - The crew with the highest score received 300 points, then 2nd to 3rd place crews had 10 points deducted per rank.
- Live Global Online Voting (70%) - The crew with the highest score received 700 points, then 2nd to 3rd place crews had 50 points deducted per rank. Voting was done via SMS (limited within South Korea only) and via MNet Plus app. Voting period is from the beginning of the show until the announcement of winners.
- Additional points in the finale stage - 50 points

Combined Finals Results (Original "SWF" Theme + Crew Identity + World Finale with JYP Missions)
Rank	Crew	Scores			
Rank	Crew	Preliminary Vote	Live Global Online Vote	World Finale with JYP Mission Bonus Points	Final Score
1	**Osaka Ojo Gang**	300	700	-	1000
2	**Ag Squad**	290	650	50	990
3	**Motiv**	280	600	-	880

Indicates winner of World of Street Woman Fighter
Indicates the 2nd place crew
Indicates the 3rd place crew

== Final Ranking ==
Crews' final rankings
Rank	Crew	Notes
1st place, gold medalist(s)	Osaka Ojo Gang	Winner
2nd place, silver medalist(s)	AG Squad	Runner-up
3rd place, bronze medalist(s)	Motiv	3rd place
4	Bumsup	Eliminated in Episode 8
5	RHTokyo	Eliminated in Episode 6
6	Royal Family	Eliminated in Episode 4

=== Results Summary ===
Colour Key

Crew was having the highest score of the mission.
Crew was in the bottom two and had to do elimination battle.

Crew	No Respect Battle^{1}	Class Mission^{1}	World of Kpop^{2}	Mega Crew	Global Artist Performance + Dance Film	JYP Mission	Final
Osaka Ojo Gang	3rd	3rd^{5}	6th Loss	3rd	2nd	Not Chosen	1st
AG Squad	4th^{3}	2nd^{4}	1st Win	4th	1st	Chosen	2nd
Motiv	2nd	3rd^{5}	5th Win	2nd	4th	Not Chosen	3rd
Bumsup	6th	6th	2nd Win	1st	3rd	Eliminated (Episode 8)	
RHTokyo	1st	1st	3rd Loss^{6}	5th	Eliminated (Episode 6)		
Royal Family	4th^{3}	2nd^{4}	4th Loss	Eliminated (Episode 4)			
Elimination Battle			Osaka Ojo Gang, Royal Family	AG Squad, RHTokyo	Bumsup, Motiv	No elimination battle; results were based on public votes & judges' score	
Eliminated			Royal Family; Loss; 3 of 5 Battle	RHTokyo; Loss; 3 of 4 Battle	Bumsup; Loss; 3 of 5 Battle	No elimination battle; results were based on public votes & judges' score	

- ^1 There is no elimination in this round.
- ^2 Each crew will battle with chosen song, the winning crew will decided by the cumulative of judges' score & online views+likes.
- ^3 Both crew are tied with having 4 Wins and 6 Loss.
- ^4 Both crew are tied with having total score of 50.
- ^5 Both crew are tied with having total score of 0.
- ^6 RHTokyo's score had the highest score of the losing crew and saved from elimination battle.

== Original soundtrack ==
=== Part 0 ===
Released on April 9, 2025
No.	Title	Lyrics	Music	Length
1.	"All in AUS (AG Squad Crew)"	Awrii (The Hub)	Aftrshok (The Hub); Joseph K (The Hub); NF; Chase; Larmook; Awrii (The Hub)	0:46
2.	"Crown's Up (Royal Family Crew)"	Awrii (The Hub)	Joseph K (The Hub); Thru; Shynsu; Awrii (The Hub)	0:45
3.	"Gang's Spirit Queen's Moves (Osaka Ojo Gang Crew)"	Chanti (The Hub)	Strong Dragon (The Hub); Joseph K (The Hub); Thru; Chanti (The Hub)	0:37
4.	"Mek it Bums Up (Bumsup Crew)"	Awrii (The Hub)	Aftrshok (The Hub); NF; Deadbear; Awrii (The Hub)	0:45
5.	"Real Hot Tokyo (RHTokyo Crew)"	Awrii (The Hub); Chanti (The Hub)	Aftrshok (The Hub); NF; Awrii (The Hub); Chanti (The Hub)	0:44
6.	"What's Your Motiv? (Motiv Crew)"	Chanti (The Hub)	Honey Noise (The Hub); Brown Panda (The Hub); Aftrshok (The Hub); Bluar; Chanti (The Hub)	0:39
Total length:				4:19

=== Part 1 ===
Released on May 27, 2025
No.	Title	Lyrics	Music	Artist	Length
1.	"Champion" (produced by The Hub)	Lee Ha-jin; Soulkidd; Y0ung (MUMW); Sero; HL2; HL3; Noerio (The Hub)	Honey Noise (The Hub); Noerio (The Hub); Willy	Sung Han-bin (Zerobaseone)	2:33
2.	"Sass" (produced by The Hub)	Y0ung (MUMW); Chae Ri-ha (MUMW); Camel Park (MUMW); Lee Ha-jin; Soulkidd; Ayushy (The Hub); Jacob Aaron (The Hub)	Aftrshok (The Hub); NF; Ayushy (The Hub); Jacob Aaron (The Hub)	Izna	2:51
3.	"Talk to the Moon" (produced by The Hub)	Lee Ha-jin; Sero; HL2; HL3; Kaya (MUMW); Y0ung (MUMW); Noerio (The Hub); Julius	Joseph K (The Hub); Aftrshok (The Hub); Noerio (The Hub); Julius; Honey Noise (The Hub)	Kim Min-seok	3:30
4.	"Always a Good Time" (produced by The Hub)	Lee Ha-jin; Charis (MUMW); SSAC (MUMW); Sero; HL2; HL3; Awrii (The Hub); Drew Lock; Rachel West	Aftrshok (The Hub); NF; Awrii (The Hub); Drew Lock; Rachel West	Ash Island	2:46
Total length:					11:40

=== Part 2 ===
Released on June 10, 2025
No.	Title	Lyrics	Music	Artist	Length
1.	"ECHO!" (produced by Woozi)	Woozi; Bumzu; Hoshi	Woozi; Bumzu; Jin Jeon	Hoshi X Woozi	2:33
2.	"Ridin'" (produced by The Hub)	Lee Ha-jin; Irene Seo (MUMW); Y0ung (MUMW); Vacation (MUMW); Awrii (The Hub); Ayushy (The Hub)	Strong Dragon (The Hub); Joseph K (The Hub); Ayushy (The Hub); Awrii (The Hub)	Lily (Nmixx); Jiwoo (Nmixx); Kyujin (Nmixx)	2:47
3.	"Flip Flop" (produced by Padi)	Padi; Choi May; Since	Padi; Ikbbo	Gummy; Since	2:59
Total length:					8:19

=== Part 3 ===
Released on July 8, 2025
No.	Title	Lyrics	Music	Artist	Length
1.	"Shake It Fast" (produced by The Hub)	Saweetie; Smitty	Brian U (The Hub); Honey Noise (The Hub); Brown Panda (The Hub); Saweetie; Smitty	Saweetie	2:11
2.	"Shake It Fast" (produced by The Hub; Inst.)		Brian U (The Hub); Honey Noise (The Hub); Brown Panda (The Hub); Saweetie; Smitty		2:11
Total length:					4:22

=== Part 4 ===
Released on July 22, 2025
No.	Title	Lyrics	Music	Artist	Length
1.	"Gatsby"	Bailey Flores; JBach; J.Y. Park	Bailey Flores; Bennett Lee Suede; J.Y. Park	J.Y.Park	2:08
2.	"Gatsby (Backing Track)"		Bailey Flores; Bennett Lee Suede; J.Y. Park		2:08
Total length:					4:16

== Viewership ==
World of Street Woman Fighter : South Korea viewers per episode (thousands)

Season	Episode number								
Season	1	2	3	4	5	6	7	8	9
5	281	340	266	409	425	437	350	338	N/A

Source: Audience measurement performed nationwide by Nielsen Korea.

Average TV viewership ratings
Ep.	Original broadcast date	Average audience share (Nielsen Korea)	
Ep.	Original broadcast date	Nationwide	Seoul
1	May 27, 2025	0.85% (28th)	1.243% (8th)
2	June 3, 2025	0.95% (25th)	N/A
3	June 10, 2025	0.95% (22nd)	N/A
4	June 17, 2025	1.23% (7th)	1.676% (5th)
5	June 24, 2025	1.24% (11th)	1.458% (6th)
6	July 1, 2025	1.29% (7th)	1.610% (4th)
7	July 8, 2025	1.17% (12th)	1.521% (5th)
8	July 15, 2025	1.17% (6th)	1.430% (5th)
9	July 22, 2025	N/A	N/A
Average		1.10% (Note: This average ratings is based on the published ratings, the exact average ratings is unknown due to one rating not published.)	1.489% (Note: This average ratings is based on the published ratings, the exact average ratings is unknown due to three rating not published.)
In the table above, the blue numbers represent the lowest ratings and the red numbers represent the highest ratings.; N/A denotes ratings that were not published.; This show airs on a cable channel/pay TV which normally has a relatively smaller audience compared to free-to-air TV/public broadcasters (KBS, SBS, MBC and EBS).
