= Brotherhood (dance group) =

Canadian dance group

- Full name: Brotherhood Dance Crew
- Sport: Hip-hop dance
- Founded: 2011
- League: International Dance League
- Division: Pro division
- Based in: Vancouver, British Columbia, Canada
- Origin: Surrey, British Columbia, Canada
- Founder: Scott Forsyth
- Directors: Scott Forsyth; Adrian Vendiola
- Website: www.brotherhoodcrew.com

Brotherhood (also known as the Brotherhood Dance Crew) is a Canadian all-male hip-hop dance crew founded in Surrey, British Columbia and currently based in Vancouver, formed in 2011 by Canadian dancer and choreographer Scott Forsyth.

Brotherhood has won numerous international titles, including back-to-back gold medals at the World Hip Hop Dance Championship, three consecutive wins at the World of Dance Vancouver, the Body Rock Dance Competition, and the VIBE Dance Competition. The group also appeared on season two of NBC's World of Dance in 2018. In 2025, Brotherhood joined the International Dance League as a professional franchise team, winning its launch event before being crowned the inaugural regular season champion in 2026.

== History ==
=== Formation and early competitions (2011–2020) ===
Brotherhood was founded in 2011 by Scott Forsyth in Surrey, British Columbia alongside a group of local dancers and choreographers. The group initially rehearsed in the basement of Our Lady of Good Counsel church in Whalley. Without a permanent studio space, the crew often rented facilities after hours, practicing from 10 p.m. to 3 a.m. while members balanced day jobs and school.

The crew quickly gained prominence on the international competitive dance circuit. From 2013 to 2015, they won three consecutive World of Dance Vancouver titles. During the same period, Brotherhood secured back-to-back gold medals at the World Hip Hop Dance Championship held at the Red Rock Resort in Las Vegas, winning the varsity and adult divisions in 2013 and 2014, respectively. In 2015, the group placed first at the Body Rock Dance Competition in San Diego, California and placed second the following year.

Brotherhood also competed at the VIBE Dance Competition in Costa Mesa, California, winning first place in 2017 with a routine based on the American television dating game show Love Connection. In 2018, the crew competed in the second season of NBC's reality competition television show World of Dance, to which they reached the duels round. In 2019, Brotherhood competed again at the VIBE Dance Competition and won. Their 2019 winning routine was built around the theme of internet criticism, incorporating real negative comments posted on their past videos into the performance's concept.

World of Dance performances
Round	Judges' scores (Note: Individual judges' scores are listed in the following order: Ne-Yo, Jennifer Lopez, Derek Hough.)			Average	Result
The Qualifiers	81	75	85	80.3	Qualified
The Duels	94	91	93	92.7	Eliminated

They also made regular appearances at regional and international dance events, including Hit the Floor competitions in Toronto in 2017 and Gatineau in 2020, Artists Emerge, and Dancers Paradise. In 2019, the Surrey Board of Trade awarded Brotherhood the Arts and Innovation Award at the SBoT Arts & Business Awards.

=== International Dance League (2025–present) ===
Following a six-year hiatus, Brotherhood returned to competing in 2025 as a founding professional team in the International Dance League (IDL), a competition framework created by Steezy co-founders Connor Lim and Evan Zhou.

At the IDL launch event on July 26, 2025 held at the Shrine Expo Hall in Los Angeles, Brotherhood competed in the professional division against other international crews. During the first round matchup against New Zealand's Royal Family, Brotherhood performed a routine that featured an "aura farming" sequence paying tribute to an Indonesian viral video. Brotherhood won the match with a 5–0 sweep. The group then competed in the final round against USA's GRV and South Korea's 1Million, ultimately winning the 2025 IDL Championship and a US$20,000 prize, garnering a final score of 99.50%.

The crew's first round performance, choreographed to the song "Move" by rappers Lecrae and 1K Phew, became viral on the video sharing platform TikTok that significantly increased the track's streaming metrics. As reported by Luminate, weekly US on-demand streams for the song rose from 23,000 for the week ending July 24 to 47,000 the following week, marking a 104% increase, and reached 104,000 streams the week after, which represented a further 122% increase. A portion of the same performance was later added as an emote in the online video game Fortnite.

For the 2026 IDL season, directors Scott Forsyth and Adrian Vendiola elected to retain their 20-member championship core, only adding two members. Brotherhood maintained their competitive lead early in the season, securing first-place finishes in the first half of the season. The crew's victory following the Vancouver series also drove a significant increase in online engagement and music streaming of the song "I Want You Back" by NSYNC following a dance trend lifted from its second round performance. According to Luminate, US on-demand streams for the track rose from 379,000 during the week of the win to over 687,000 two weeks later, which is an 81% increase propelled by viral TikTok clips of users attempting the choreography.

Following its win in the Seoul series, the group clinched the number one seed for the championship. Brotherhood ultimately placed second in the championship series following their undefeated streak across the season, finishing behind GRV with a 0.43 difference. Despite this, Brotherhood was still declared as the regular season champion, receiving a US$200,000 payout.

== Style, group culture, and philosophy ==
Brotherhood performs mainly hip-hop, which integrates locking, waacking, and other different dance styles and genres. The group often incorporates storytelling elements into their sets. Forsyth credits the crew's synchronization to chemistry and longevity, noting that a large portion of the team's core has remained intact since its early years. With some members having danced together for approximately 15 years, they are able to anticipate each other's timing and movement. Rather than revolving around a single performer, the team shares opportunities to lead and rotates different members into the center position.

Forsyth has stated that this shared focus eliminates competition for the spotlight. He notes that the team's connection extends beyond rehearsals, with members supporting one another through personal life events, health concerns, and financial challenges. He bases his leadership approach on supporting his team both inside and outside the studio. Their philosophy is: "Don’t take yourself too seriously and never let the opinions of others determine your self-worth. Just keep creating, inspiring, and remember your purpose."

== Members ==
=== Current roster ===
Source adapted from the International Dance League.

- Scott Forsyth – founder, co-director, IDL co-captain
- Adrian Vendiola – co-director, IDL co-captain
- Kelvin Tu – IDL co-captain
- Andrew Ha
- Angelo Admana
- Alo Galedo
- Christian Demetillo
- Dayton Paradis
- Dillon Tran
- Eldon Linsangan
- Elijah Uy
- Francis Aranton
- Humuza Bazira
- Jaymie Sorongon
- Jon Ray Dy Buco
- Josh Mendonça
- Justin Lewis
- Michael Delleva
- Miguel Axibal
- Randall Mella
- Ryan McEwen

=== Other members ===
Attributed to multiple sources.

- AJ Okyere
- David de Guzman
- Devan Isaac
- James Tejada
- Jerome Hocson
- Jesko Guiang
- Justin Nicolas
- Nathan Gavilan
- Raveinal Lescano
- Jacob Soriano

== Dancing results ==
List of competitions and results
Competition	Year	Result	Ref.
Arena LA Dance Competition	2018	Third place	
Body Rock Dance Competition	2015	Won	
Body Rock Dance Competition	2016	Second place	
International Dance League	2025	Won	
International Dance League	2026	Second place (Note: Despite finishing second in the championship, Brotherhood was still declared as the regular season champion.)	
VIBE Dance Competition	2016	Finalist	
VIBE Dance Competition	2017	Won	
VIBE Dance Competition	2019	Won	
World Hip Hop Dance Championship Adult Division	2014	Won	
World Hip Hop Dance Championship Adult Division	2015	Fifth place	
World Hip Hop Dance Championship Varsity Division	2013	Won	
World Hip Hop Dance Championship Varsity Division	2014	Fourth place	
World Hip Hop Dance Championship Varsity Division	2015	Fifth place	
World of Dance season 2	2018	Duels round	
World of Dance Vancouver	2013	Won	
World of Dance Vancouver	2014	Won	
World of Dance Vancouver	2015	Won	

=== International Dance League ===
==== 2025 ====
IDL 2025 matches and results
Round	Opponent	Result	Score
1	(New Zealand) Royal Family	Won	5–0
2	(United States) GRV / (South Korea) 1Million	Won	99.50, 95.69, 81.81

==== 2026 ====
IDL 2026 matches and results
Series	Round	Opponent	Result	Score
New York	1	(South Korea) 1Million	Won	7–0
New York	2	(Norway) Quick Style / (New Zealand) Royal Family	Won	99.28, 89.97, 86.25
Vancouver	1	(United States) GRV	Won	7–0
Vancouver	2	(ASEAN) Jam Republic / (South Korea) 1Million	Won	93.81, 86.31, 85.54
Sydney	1	(New Zealand) Royal Family	Won	7–0
Sydney	2	(United States) GRV / (South Korea) 1Million	Won	93.19, 90.77, 89.37
Seoul	1	(Norway) Quick Style	Won	7–0
Seoul	2	(South Korea) 1Million / (New Zealand) Royal Family	Won	92.25, 89.84, 87.91
Los Angeles	1	(ASEAN) Jam Republic	Won	7–0
Los Angeles	2	(United States) GRV / (New Zealand) Royal Family	Won	96.70, 90.99, 89.31
Championship	1	(Norway) Quick Style (Seed 6)	Won	7–0
Championship	2	(United States) GRV / (ASEAN) Jam Republic	Second	94.00, 93.57, 90.86

== Accolades ==
Year	Award	Category	Result	Ref.
2019	Surrey Board of Trade Arts & Business Awards	Arts and Innovation Award	Awarded	
