= Philippine All Stars =

Filipino Hip-hop dance group

The Philippine All-Stars is a Filipino Hip-hop dance group from the Philippines and the pioneer of Pinoy Hip-hop. They won the 2006 and 2008 World Hip Hop Dance Championships.

They were formed in 2005 by twelve individuals that were working in the Manila underground Hip-hop scene. They also joined the “Artists Revolution: 365 days to change” campaign which asks the Filipino voters to be more critical in choosing their political leaders in the coming 2010 elections. This group set the high standard of dancing in the Philippines and gave the young dancers hope and inspirations.

== History ==
The Philippine Allstars was started in 2005 by twelve friends who wanted to collectively represent their country in the World Hip-Hop Championships held in the US. That year after taking first in the Maximum Groovity II, National Hip-Hop Open, they proudly placed sixth in the world.

In 2006, Allstars put the Philippines on the map of Hip-hop dance in becoming the first Asian country to win back-to-back World Gold titles in the International Hip-hop Open d’Ítalia in Turin, Italy and in the World Hip-Hop Dance Championships in Los Angeles, California. The next year, the group took Bronze in the same competition and also won Team of the Year from V.Ent's First Annual Dance Awards.

In 2008, they came back strong again and took Gold with their 2008 iconic and legendary routine in the World Hip-Hop Dance Championships held in Las Vegas. They also won the Grand Champion in the Malta Guinness Street Dance Competition, Kenya, Africa, and in the same year won 1st Runner Up, UDO World Street Dancing Championships, Blackpoll, United Kingdom.

In February 2010, they opened their first dance school, the Allstars Dance School, located in San Juan city Philippines.

=== Original founding members ===
- Kenjhons Serrano
- Chelo Aestrid
- Maya Carandang
- Michelle "Tzy" Salazar
- Jhong Mesina
- Reagan Cornelio
- Lema Diaz
- Kyxz Mendiola
- Patrick Caballa
- Eye Vee Lobrin
- Sheena Vera Cruz
- Laurence Chua

=== Others ===
- Prince Paltu-Ob
- Madelle Enriquez
- Niko Bolante
- Deo Bantillo
- Vince Mendoza
- Naomi Tamayo
- Heidi Riego
- Krista Roma
- Catherine Sabayle
- Ac Lalata
- Rycher Alfonso
- Boh Valdez
- Matthew Padilla
- Orwayne de Leon
- Jay Lau
- Franco Hernandez

=== Major Endorsement ===
- Smart Bro (2010)
- Nestea Fit (2009)

== Major Events/Gigs/Concerts ==
- Lea Salonga - Your Songs Concert (2009–2010)
- Front Act (with Q-York), Pussycat Dolls Concert (June 2009)
- 365 Days To Change, Music Museum (May 2009)
- Lovapalooza, MOA Open Field (Feb 2007)
- Adidas Philippines MVP Night, Bellevue Hotel (June 2006)
- Hip Hop Awards (2006, 2007)

=== TV Guestings, interviews, features ===
- Showtime (2010)
- ASAP (2010)
- ASAP '09 (March/April 2009)
- Proudly Filipino, QTV11 (Oct 2008)
- America's Best Dance Crew (Performance for Live Audience) (Aug 2008)
- Rated K, ABS-CBN (June 2008)
- Wowowee (June 2008)
- Sharon (May 2008)
- Boy & Kris
- ABS-CBN Summer Team Kapamilya Station ID (Mar 2008)
- (2005–2007) TFC Bravura, Sports Unlimited, TV Patrol, Kay Gandang Umaga, Life @ ANC, Mornings @ ANC, 700Club Asia, 100% Pinoy, Unang Hirit, Homeboy, ASAP, GroopieTV, E-TV, Eat Bulaga, SOP, Master Showman, Urban MYX, Star MYX, MTV Jukebox

=== ALLSTARS concerts and events ===
- Beyond Hip Hop, SM Amphitheater, Pampanga (Jan 2009)
- Hip Hop Generation, Clarke Quay Arena, Singapore (Sept 2008)
- Choreographer's Birth, Irwin Theater, Ateneo (June 2008)
- Beyond Hip Hop, Balara, Bataan (2008)
- Beyond Hip Hop in San Diego, National City, CA (Aug 2007)
- Allstars Anniversary/Dance Battle, Ratsky's Morato (June 2007)
- Allstars Studded Night: The Send-Off Party, Embassy Superclub (July 2007)
- Beyond Hip Hop: The Repeat, Metrobar (July 2007)
- Beyond Hip Hop, Metrobar (June 2007)

== Achievements ==
- 2006 Hiphop Open Italy (𝗖𝗵𝗮𝗺𝗽𝗶𝗼𝗻)
- 2006 World Hip Hop Dance Championship (𝗖𝗵𝗮𝗺𝗽𝗶𝗼𝗻)
- 2007 World Hip Hop Dance Championship (Bronze medalist)
- 2008 World Hip Hop Dance Championship (𝗖𝗵𝗮𝗺𝗽𝗶𝗼𝗻)
- 2009 World Hip Hop Dance Championship (Finalist)
- 2009 Kenya Street Dance Africa (𝗖𝗵𝗮𝗺𝗽𝗶𝗼𝗻)
- 2009 UDO World Street Dancing Championships (Silver medalist)
- 2010 TRI ASIA Competition (𝗖𝗵𝗮𝗺𝗽𝗶𝗼𝗻)
- 2011 Dance2Dance Switzerland (𝗖𝗵𝗮𝗺𝗽𝗶𝗼𝗻)
- 2013 World Hiphop Dance Championships (Finalist)
- 2013 World of Dance Bay Area (Bronze medalist)
