= Kyoka Yamamoto =

Japanese hip-hop dancer

Kyoka
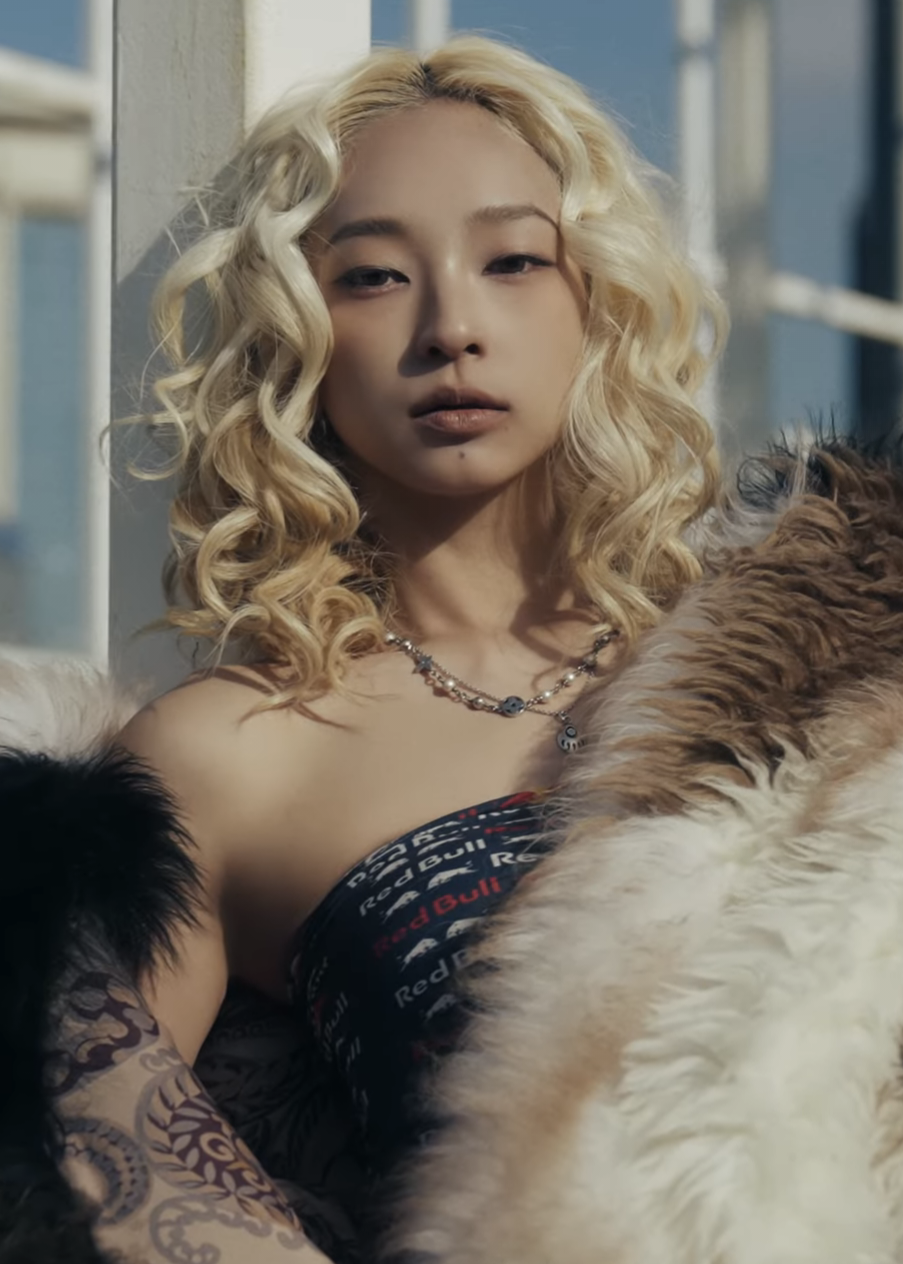
- Kyoka in 2025
- Born: Kyoka Yamamoto; April 24, 1996 (age 29); Osaka, Japan
- Occupation: Hip-hop dancer
- Years active: 2002–present
- Career
- Current group: Rushball (2004–present); Toughness 10; Red Bull Dancers
- Former groups: Osaka Ojo Gang; Nineties; Dream Girls; Stroke
- Dances: Hip-hop, jazz, soul

Kyoka Yamamoto (Japanese: 山本恭華,きょうか ; born April 24, 1996) is a Japanese hip-hop dancer and model from Osaka, Japan. She is best known as a part of the dance duo Rushball, formed in June 2004 with her partner Maika. She is the first non-breaking dancer to be included on the global roster of Red Bull Dancers, a group of street dancers sponsored by Red Bull.

== Biography ==
=== Early life ===
Born in 1996 as the youngest of three siblings, Kyoka followed in her brothers' footsteps by training in karate. She brings the discipline and mindset of martial arts into her dance.

=== Career ===
Kyoka began dancing in 2002. She participated in her first dance competition at the age of eight. In addition to hip-hop, she also performs jazz and soul dance styles. She has been an active participant in underground hiphop dance scene for nearly two decades. Her dance career has been notably influenced by her instructors Wild Cherry and D'oam.

Kyoka was the lead in Step Out, a three-episode series produced by Red Bull, in which she trained in shorinji martial arts, capoeira, and flamenco. She was also featured in Season 1 of The Ins and Outs Show by Red Bull, a series that spotlights four emerging women in Japan's music and dance scene.

Kyoka was also part of the Japanese dance crew Nineties, which includes a collective of close friends and notable dancers such as Ibuki (from Bad Queen), Ruu, Kazane, Katsuya, Momoca, Alex, TwinTwiggz, PrinceTwiggz, Taisuke, and her brother Youki.

In 2022, Kyoka competed in the Chinese dance competition television program Street Dance of China Season 5, where she finished as the runner-up and became the first foreign female dancer to achieve this title in the show's history. As of 2025, she is a member of Osaka Ojo Gang, a team featured on the Korean reality dance competition show World of Street Woman Fighter. Osaka Ojo Gang claimed the championship in the live finale aired on July 22, 2025, topping AG SQUAD and MOTIV.

Apart from her dance career, Kyoka also worked as a model and collaborated with major brands.

=== Rushball ===
Hailing from Osaka, Kyoka and Maika began their dance journey at a young age, meeting in a local dance studio when they were eight and six, respectively. The name Rushball was chosen by Maika's mother to represent "powerful kids who can dance like a bouncing ball".

Rushball gained international recognition in March 2012 when they placed second at the prestigious Juste Debout dance competition in France. At the time, Kyoka and Maika were just 14 and 16 years old, respectively. Four years later, the duo secured a 4–0 victory and made history by becoming the first Japanese crew to win the Juste Debout title in 2016. The duo continued their success by winning the World Dance Colosseum in the hip hop category in Tokyo in 2019, and again in 2024.

In 2023, Rushball also won the 2-on-2 Open-Styles battles at the Circle Dance Lab, defeating a lineup of prominent dancers including Zyko, Poppin C, Nelson, and Da Switch.

== List of notable achievements ==
- Dance Challenge (winner)
- Dance@Live Kids 2009 (side finalist)
- Dance@Live Kids 2010 (side finalist)
- World Dance Colosseum 2011 Hip Hop 2on2 Battle (winner) (Rushball)
- Juste Debout 2012 Japan (winner) (Rushball)
- Juste Debout 2012 World (runner-up) (Rushball)
- Summer Dance Forever 2014 (runner-up)
- Japan Dance Delight 2014 (winner)
- Yo It's Free 2015 (winner)
- KOD Japan 2015 (winner)
- Juste Debout 2016 (winner) (Rushball)
- Summer Dance Forever 2018 (Top 4)
- World Dance Colosseum Hip Hop 2on2 Battle 2019 (winner) (Rushball)
- Bring Down 10th Anniversary Hip Hop 1on1 Battle 2020 (winner)
- Dance@Live Hip Hop 2020&2021 (winner)
- FRESH!? Hip Hop Solo Battle 2021 (winner)
- Street Dancer of China Season 5 (runner-up)
- Area UDC Battle 2023 (Top 4)
- Circle Dance Lab 2-on-2 Open-Styles 2023 (winner) (Rushball)
- World Dance Colosseum 2024 (winner) (Rushball)
- FRESH!? Female Side and Final Battle 2024 (winner)
- World of Street Woman Fighter (winner) (Osaka Ojo Gang)

== See also ==
- List of dancers
- List of female dancers
- Street dancers
- Women in dance
- Street Dance of China
- World of Street Woman Fighter
