= LaTasha Barnes =

American jazz and house dancer (born 1980)

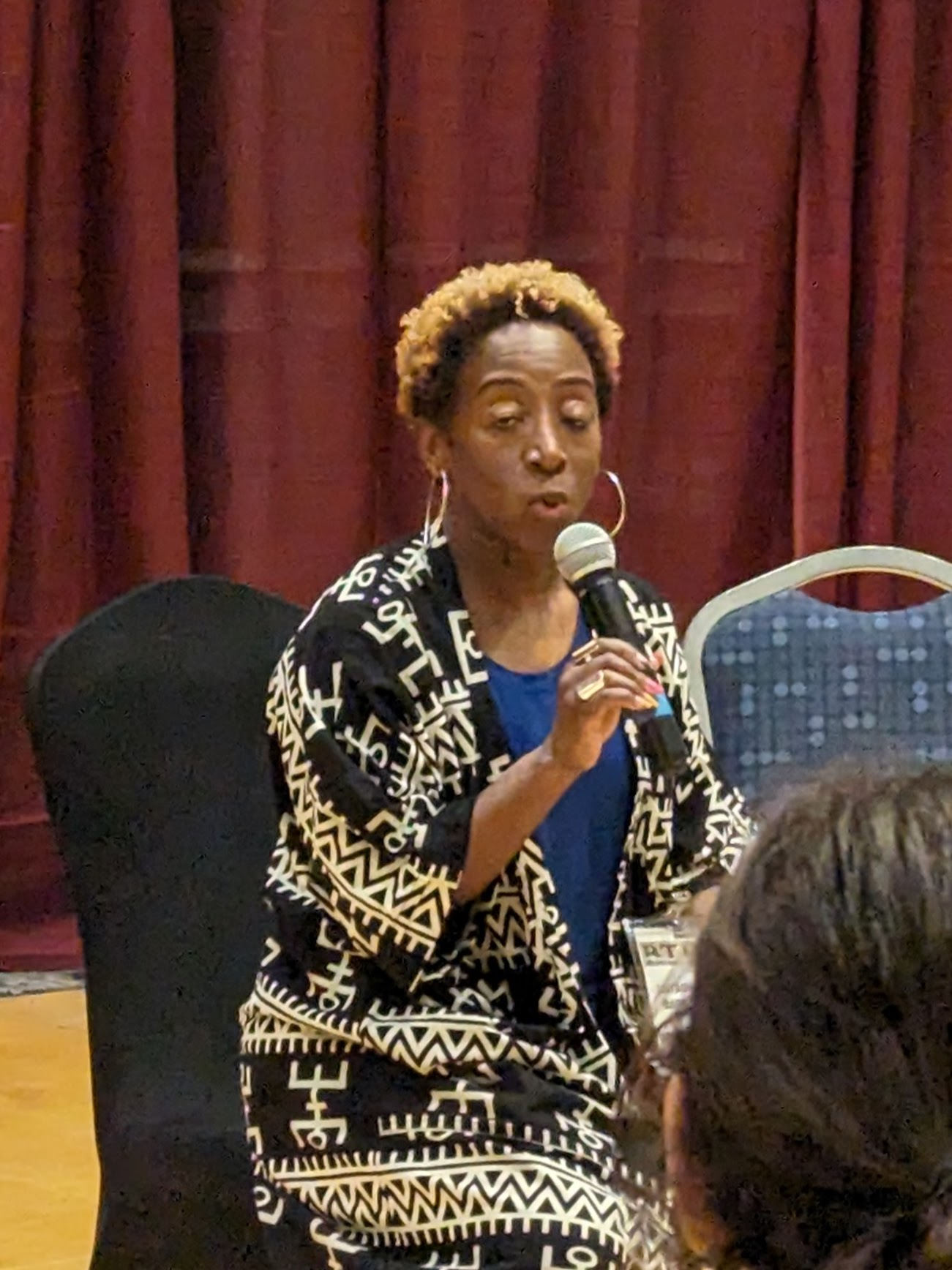
LaTasha Barnes in 2024

LaTasha Barnes is an American dancer, educator, and choreographer. She is the creator and director of The Jazz Continuum, an African roots-based production encompassing Lindy Hop, house dance, locking, breaking, voguing, and jazz dance that connects dance of the swing era to dance today. The show debuted at the Guggenheim Museum in New York City in 2021, and continues to tour in the U.S.

== Early years ==
Barnes was born in Richmond, Virginia, where she was exposed to music at an early age, having a DJ father. During elementary school Barnes took dance classes, and traded moves with her cousins and friends from New York and Washington, D.C. Due to her father's role as an Active Guard Reserve, Barnes became involved in the junior Marine Corps and Junior ROTC. After graduating from high school, she enlisted in the Army in 1998 and became a satellite communications operator, sergeant first class. After serving five years in the army, she was hired by the White House Communications Agency in Washington, D.C. In 2004, Barnes was hit by a car, injuring her lower back, hip, and breaking her wrist. While recovering from these injuries, Barnes took a hip-hop class in popping and regained mobility. Her popping teacher introduced her to Junious Brickhouse, founder of Urban Artistry company in Washington, D.C. Barnes began studying house dance and in time joined the leadership team. In 2011, Barnes and her dance partner Toyin Sogunro placed first in a dance battle at Juste Debout in Paris.

== Performing career ==
In the 2010s, Barnes became more interested in jazz dance and its African American origins, particularly Lindy Hop, which she felt was closely related to the house styles she had been doing. She attended the International Lindy Hop Championships and other Lindy Hop competitions, where she won awards for her dancing. At times, she mingled her house and jazz styles. In 2016, she won a solo jazz competition at the Herräng Dance Camp in Sweden, and won first place in the Advanced Jack & Jill Lindy Hop Championships with her partner Jason Hizon. In 2017, she won second place in the Lindyfest All-Star Jack and Jill Lindy Hop Championships with partner Blake Thiessen. In 2019, she won the Luck of the Draw contest with partner Nick Williams at the International Lindy Hop Championships. Barnes continued placing in dance competitions and performing internationally.

During this time period, Barnes began a collaboration with Caleb Teicher & Friends. The collaboration resulted in the 2021 show "Swing Out", currently touring the U.S. This show, rooted in African American dance from the late 1800s and early 1900s, is a mix of tap and vernacular jazz. Company members dance to a live, onstage band playing tunes from the swing era. The show, produced by the Joyce Theater in New York, was created by Teicher along with a small group of collaborators including Barnes.

Barnes' recent show, The Jazz Continuum continues to tour the U.S. as of October 2024. Backed by Barnes' scholarly research into African diasporic forms, the show is an homage to the dancers who laid the foundation of Black vernacular dance in the Jazz Age. The show is meant to represent dancing from social spaces including clubs, ballrooms, and parties and incorporates an improvisational spirit. Critic Janine Parker noted that the show incorporates various dance styles such as the Lindy Hop, soft shoe, and hip hop, where a live band of four musicians interacts with the dancers. The titular "jazz continuum" is created by connecting creative figures from the early 20th century such as Norma Miller and Frankie Manning with contemporary jazz material. The show was a New York Times critics' pick for 2022.

== Educator ==
As an educator, Barnes teaches African diasporic dance forms at Arizona State University, as well as swing dance and related styles as a guest artist at conferences and other universities. As part of her teaching, Barnes explains the key role of African Americans in developing African diasporic dance forms including hip hop, swing dance, and jazz dance. In 2016, Barnes performed with well-known swing dancers from an earlier generation including Norma Miller, Chester Whitmore, Barbara Billups, and Sugar Sullivan. Because of her experience with these elders and her own extended family, Barnes has taken on some of the responsibility for keeping the history of vernacular Black dance forms alive. Barnes was also a teacher and performer at the Mother City Hop Jazz Festival in Cape Town, South Africa, in 2019. In addition to her work abroad, she has served as a panelist and choreographer at cultural institutions and universities. For instance in 2018, she served as a panelist on the history of Lindy Hop at the Lincoln Center of Performing Arts. In 2023, she lectured on Hip-Hop dance at Arizona State University. In 2024, she did a five-day residency at Boston University where she taught classes and choreography.

As she became more involved in authentic jazz dance, and Lindy Hop in particular, Barnes began a self-designed master's program in Ethnochoreology, Black Studies, and Performance Studies at New York University's Gallatin School. Barnes interviewed Black dancers for her thesis, which explores the connections among jazz, funk, hip-hop, and house dance, and investigates why many Black dancers were not aware of these connections. In 2021, Barnes was hired as an assistant professor, then promoted to associate professor of Dance at the Arizona State University School of Music, Dance, and Theater. She teaches several courses including all levels of Hip Hop; House dance; Authentic Jazz Dance; Dance in U.S. Popular Culture; Creative Practice, and others. In addition, she co-directs the yearly Sol Power Street Dance Festival in Tempe, Arizona.

== Awards and achievements ==
Barnes has received two Bessie Awards. Her 2021 Bessie was for outstanding performance and "sustained achievement in dance". In 2023, she received the Bessie Outstanding Creator/Choreographer Award for her show The Jazz Continuum. She has collaborated with Caleb Teicher on his show Swing Out, which has appeared across the U.S. including at the Lincoln Center in New York. Barnes is also vice president of marketing and outreach for the International Lindy Hop Championships, where she is one of the organizers. Barnes currently teaches at Arizona State University in the department of film, dance, and theater.
