= ReQuest Dance Crew =

Hip-hop dance crew from New Zealand

Request Dance Crew
- Other names: Original Lineup: Parris Goebel, Bianca Ikinofo, Oriana Siew-Kim (Whaiapu), Reimy Jones, Malaena Eagle, Colette Kaiwai (Eagle), Sam De-Leon (Cahill), Kaili Bright, Courtney Hale, Bonnie Talamaivao, Ngavaine Tearea, Janina Thompson. 2nd Lineup: Kaea Pearce, Kyra Aoake, Shyvon Campbell, Onyeka Arapai, Althea Strydom, Kirsten Dodgen, Alex Carson, Christa Albert, Jessica Toatoa, Kerrie Milne.
- Occupations: Dancer; Choreographer; Creative Director
- Years active: 2007–present
- Agent: Brett Goebel
- Known for: Justin Bieber's music video 'Sorry'
- Website: www.thepalacedancestudio.com

ReQuest Dance Crew, also known as just ReQuest, are an all-female hip-hop dance crew from Auckland, New Zealand. Created by Parris Goebel in 2007, with originally five members. They are based out of The Palace Dance Studio in Penrose and are one of ten crews alongside The Royal Family (MegaCrew), The Royal Family Varisty (MegaCrew), ReQuest (Adult), Misfits (Adult), Kings (Adult), Kingsmen (Adult), Inlaws (Varsity), Sorority (Varsity), Duchesses (Varsity), and Bubblegum (Junior).

== Competitions ==
In 2009, ReQuest competed for the first time at the HHI World Hip Hop Dance Championships in Las Vegas, winning first place in the Varsity Crews division. The following year ReQuest moved into the Adult Crews division where they again placed first, ahead of American crew Poreotics who had won season 5 of America's Best Dance Crew earlier that year. In 2011 they won second place at the World Championships, behind Plague from the United Kingdom. Within the larger The Royal Family megacrew, they have won three gold medals (2011, 2012, 2013) and one silver medal (2015) and 2016 Royal Family Varsity bronze medal at the World Hip Hop Dance Championships in the Megacrew division.

Outside of the World Championships, ReQuest placed first at the 2009 World Supremacy Battlegrounds (Varsity division) in Melbourne, and were crowned the champions of the 2012 Body Rock Dance Competition in San Diego.

== Television and live shows ==
In 2011, ReQuest successfully auditioned for season 6 of America's Best Dance Crew. They were the second international dance crew to be featured on the American show (after Blueprint Cru from Montreal, Canada in 2010), and the first crew from outside North America. ReQuest was eliminated in Week 4 of the competition.

In 2012, Goebel was hired as a choreographer for Jennifer Lopez's Dance Again World Tour. ReQuest also performed with Lopez on the season 11 finale of American Idol, and featured in the music video for her single, "Goin' In". As a result of a meeting with international casting director Jamie King, who was working with Jennifer Lopez at the time, six members of ReQuest were contracted for Cirque du Soleil's Michael Jackson: One, based in Las Vegas. Goebel herself was also contracted to serve as one of the choreographers for the show. Goebel was featured during season 15 of the US version of Dancing with the Stars, performing on stage with several dancers from ReQuest and Royal Family. Parris also goes on tour called "Skulls and Crowns" with dancers from The Palace.

In 2015, ReQuest were involved in an On-Demand television series on Māori Television called The Palace, which gave insights into the training and daily lives of the dancers at The Palace Dance Studios. In November that year, several dancers from ReQuest appeared onstage at the 2015 American Music Awards during Jennifer Lopez's opening medley performance. The following month, dancers from ReQuest and the Royal Family appeared at the 2015 Mnet Asian Music Awards, dancing on-stage for K-pop acts CL, 2NE1 and Big Bang. ReQuest dance crew were a part of Parri$ Goebel's music videos "Friday" and "Nasty." They later went on to perform at her live show in Las Vegas, August 2016. Members of ReQuest dance crew also appeared on stage with Rihanna at the Video Music Awards of 2016 for one out of three stage performances, These were Kaea Pearce, Shyvon Campbell, Kirsten Dodgen, Kyra Aoaoke and Corbyn Taulealea-Huch.

== Music videos ==
Music video appearances
Year	Artist	Song	Notes
2011	Vince Harder	"I Want This Forever"	Parris Goebel, Bianca Ikinofo, Samantha Cahill, Janina Suramach, Ngavaine Tearea, Reimy Jones, Malaena Eagle Oriana Whaiapu, Kaili Bright
2012	Jennifer Lopez	"Goin' In"	
2015	Justin Bieber	"Sorry"	(Dance performance video) Parris Goebel, Kirsten Dodgen, Kyra Aoake, Corbyn Taulealea-Huch, Kaea Pearce, Ruthy Pearce, Maddy Barnett, Samyah Powell, Maddy Golightly, Jessica Toatoa, Shyvon Campbell, Bianca Ikinofo, Leilani De Marco, Althea Strydom
2015	Justin Bieber	Children	Maddy Barnett, Samyah Powell, Giverny Hing, Ruthy Pearce, Houston Murray, Sarah Whyte, Ellise Samuels, Ally Mayerhofler, Siyanna Yarr, Drew Sackfield, Cullen Neale, Isla Potini, Teesha Siale, Alexandra Page, Frannie Aquino, Azaria Ieriko, Brianna Dixon, Aria Henry, Courtney Mckay, Isabella Thomas- Edwards, Taimania Pupuke, Sophie De Renzy, Anaya Wakelin, Faolan Okan, MJ Neethling, Jovi Ngo, Henk Tomkins, Irava Upu, Ben Rawnsley, Remy Sutton, Matthew Pule'anga, William Tuarae, Donnell Collins, Brookyln Collins, Ayla Ngaluafe, Quincy Ngaluafe, and Dasha Collins
2015	Justin Bieber	What Do You Mean?	Kirsten Dodgen, Kaea Pearce, Shyvon Campbell, Kyra Aoake, Corbyn Taulealea-Huch, Althea Strydom, Maddy Golightly, Maddy Barnett, Samyah Powell, Jessica Toatoa, Ruthy Pearce, Ling Zhang, Leilani De Marco, Bianca Ikinofo, Kealani Edwards, Weijun Sun, Keanu Feleti, Todd Williamson, Joseph Metuakore, Elvis Lopeti, Esra Pula, Justyce Petelo-Neho, Michael Metuakore, Fetu Taku, Andrew Cesan
2015	CL	"Hello Bitches"	Parris Goebel, Kirsten Dodgen, Kaea Pearce, Shyvon Campbell, Kyra Aoake, Corbyn Taulealea-Huch, Althea Strydom, Leilani De Marco, Bianca Ikinofo
2016	Grace ft. G-Eazy	You Don't Own Me	Kirsten Dodgen, Kaea Pearce, Shyvon Campbell, Corbyn Taulealea-Huch, Kyra Aoake, Maddy Barnett, Samyah Powell, Ruthy Pearce, Bianca Ikinofo, Jessica Toatoa, Martina Toderi, Leilani De Marco, Althea Strydom, Ling Zhang, Oriana Whaiapu, Maddy Golightly, Zena M'Bengue
2016	Savage & Tigermonkey"	Zooby Doo	Kirsten Dodgen, Kaea Pearce, Kyra Aoake, Corbyn Taulealea-Huch and Mini ReQuest
2017	Jason Derulo	Swalla"	Kirsten Dodgen & Kaea Pearce
2017	Psy feat. Taeyang	Love	Parris Goebel, Kyra Aoake, Kaea Pearce, Kirsten Dodgen, Corbyn Taulealea-Huch, Ruthy Pearce, Samyah Powell, Maddy Barnett, Maddy Golightly, Maddie Hale, Ling Zhang, Althea Strydom, Sarah Whyte, Jasmine Jones, Maiya Smith, Brianna Whakatau
2018	Savage X Fenty Show Vol.1	(dance performance video)	Kirsten Dodgen, Kaea Pearce, Ling Zhang, Ruthy Pearce, Shyvon Campbell, Althea Strydom
2018	Ciara	Level Up	Kaea Pearce, Kirsten Dodgen, Ruthy Pearce, Ling Zhang, Corbyn Taulealea-Huch, Isla Potini, Teesha Siale, Harmony Kiripatea, Giverny Hing, Azaria Ieriko, Maiya Smith, Pearl Tekuru, Isabella Thomas-Edwards, Althea Strydom, Maddie Hale, Maddy Golightly, Sarah Whyte
2018	Enrique Iglesias	Move To Miami (dance version)	Parris Goebel, Kirsten Dodgen, Kaea Pearce, Corbyn Taulealea-Huch, Ling Zhang, Ruthy Pearce, Harmony Kiripatea, Sarah Whyte, Maddie Hale, Althea Strydom
2019	TroyBoi	"Do You?"	Parris Goebel, Kirsten Dodgen, Ruthy Pearce, Corbyn Taulealea-Huch, Maddie Hale, Ling Zhang, Azaria Ieriko, Teesha Siale, Isla Potini, Harmony Kiripatea, Isabella Thomas-Edwards, Tyra Berryman, Renee Salesa, Pearl Tekuru, Brianna Hamilton
2019	Request Dance Crew X Kinjaz	(dance performance video)	Kirsten Dodgen, Kaea Pearce, Corbyn Taulealea-Huch, Ruthy Pearce, Ling Zhang, Pearl Tekuru, Harmony Kiripatea, Teesha Siale, Isla Potini
2020	Justin Bieber	"Yummy"	Kirsten Dodgen, Corbyn Taulealea-Huch, Ling Zhang, Harmony Kiripatea, Kaili Bright, Shyvon Campbell & Alexandra Carson
2020	Shakira & J. Lo's Super Bowl Halftime Show	(dance performance video)	Kaea Pearce, Kirsten Dodgen, Shyvon Campbell, Corbyn Taulealea-Huch, Ling Zhang, Harmony Kiripatea, Michael Metuakore, Lance Savali
2020	The Royal Family Virtual Experience	(dance performance video)	All dancers of The Royal Family Dance Crew
2020	Savage x Fenty Show Vol.2	(dance performance video)	Shyvon Campbell, Harmony Kiripatea, Renee Salesa, Ruthy Pearce, Isabella Thomas-Edwards, Teesha Siale, Jessica Toatoa, Lance Savali
2021	Savage X Fenty Show Vol.3	(dance performance video)	Kirsten Dodgen, Isla Potini, Teesha Siale, Harmony Kiripatea, Renee Salesa, Shyvon Campbell, Corbyn Taulealea-Huch
2021	Izzy La Reina - Boy Toy	(dance performance video)	Teesha Siale, Isla Potini, Shyvon Campbell, Harmony Kiripatea, Renee Salesa
2022	The Royal Estate	(dance performance video)	All dancers of the Royal Family Dance Crew
2022	Levanta Riddim	(dance performance video)	All dancers of the Royal Family Dance Crew
2023	Rihanna's Super Bowl Halftime Show	(dance performance video)	Shyvon Campbell, Isla Potini, Maddy Barnett, Teesha Siale, Jessica Toatoa, Kaili Bright, Harmony Kiripatea, Renee Salesa, Azaria Ieriko, Colette Eagle, Corbyn Taulealea-Huch, Elvis Lopeti, Justyce Petelo-Neho, Simon Sketch, Laurence Kaiwai, Christian Segi
2023	Nike Women X Parris Goebel	(dance performance video)	Kaea Pearce, Kirsten Dodgen, Harmony Kiripatea, Renee Salesa, Isla Potini, Jessica Toatoa, Teesha Siale, Maddison Wolfgramm
2023	The Royal Family Winter Camp	(dance performance)	Kirsten Dodgen, Kaea Pearce, Kyra Aoake, Lance Savali, Isla Potini, Teesha Siale, Elvis Lopeti, Corbyn Taulealea-Huch, Laurence Kaiwai, Maiya Smith, Moana Davis
2024	The Royal Family / Rihanna X India	(dance performance)	Teesha Siale, Renee Salesa, Azaria Ieriko, Harmony Kiripatea, Corbyn Taulealea-Huch, Moana Davis, Maiya Smith, Tiare Williams, Reno Peauvale, Christian Segi, Nathan Hendrix, Wo Zyee
2024	The Royal Family Class of 2024	(dance performance)	Teesha Siale, Harmony Kiripatea, Azaria Ieriko, Renee Salesa, Taimania Pupuke, Havana Beal, Maiya Smith, Moana Davis, Tiare Williams, Kylie Kippen, Kaea Southon, Loan Estevez, Lose Hafoka, Madison Wolfgramm, Ida-Maria Stenz, Maia Salesa, Meaan Dimuzio, Shaylah Harris, Robyn Brown, Sophie Stamoulos, Viktoriya Yaneva, Zaina Liang, Jennifer Fracassa, Allae Cameron-Morris, Chance Bristow, Donald Ah Loo, James Tele'a, Christian Segi, Mohamed Sessa, Nathan Hendrix, Reno Peauvale, Shea Evans, Solomona Tasi, Sio Fa'atamala, Kevin Kostov, Te Whatamanawa Tangirua, Yanis Bouchakour
2025	The Royal Family Class of 2025	(dance performance video)	Teesha Siale, Azaria Ieriko, Moana Davis, Maiya Smith, Tiare Williams, Havana Beal, Kaea Southon, Shaylah Harris, Waimania Paikea, Sophie Stamoulos, Kylie Kippen, Chance Bristow, Allae Cameron-Morris, Donald Ah Loo, Ha-neul Jeong, James Tele'a, Nathan Hendrix, Reno Peauvale, Saraseini Momo, Shayden Taare, Shea Evans, Sio Fa'atamala, Soeun Jung, Solomona Tasi
2025	World of Street Woman Fighter	(reality competition show)	Teesha Siale, Azaria Ieriko, Isla Potini, Harmony Kiripatea, Moana Davis, Maiya Smith, Tiare Williams, Kylie Kippen
2025	Killin It x Black and Gold IDL / The Royal Family Dance Crew	(dance performance video)	Teesha Siale, Azaria Ieriko, Maiya Smith, Moana Davis, Shaylah Harris, Daisy Martin, Havana Beal, Kylie Kippen, Sophie Stamoulos, Lose Hafoka, Haneul Jeong, Soeun Jung, Donald Ah Loo, Chance Bristow, Allae Cameron-Morris, Sio Fa'atamala, Solomona Tasi, James Tele'a, Shayden Taare, Nathan Hendrix

Lead choreographer Parris Goebel also appeared in Big Bang's music video "Bang Bang Bang", which she also choreographed with fellow Royal Family choreographer Kiel Tutin.

Awards and achievements
Preceded by (New Zealand) Sweet and Sour	World Hip Hop Dance Championships; Winners – Varsity Division; 2009	Succeeded by (Japan) Zero
Preceded by (France) R.A.F. Crew	World Hip Hop Dance Championships; Winners – Adult Division; 2010	Succeeded by (New Zealand) ReQuest
Preceded by (New Zealand) ReQuest	World Hip Hop Dance Championships; Winners – Adult Division; 2011	Succeeded by (Philippines) The Crew
