= Shaun Evaristo =

Filipino-American dancer and choreographer

Shaun Evaristo is a Filipino-American professional dancer and choreographer and currently CEO of Movement Lifestyle, a management company for choreographers. Shaun has taught at dance institutions that are well known by other dancers; amongst those are the Urban Dance Camp in Germany, the Broadway Dance Center in Japan, and Beat Mix in Korea. He has performed for Omarion, High School Musical star Vanessa Hudgens and Justin Bieber, and has choreographed several dance routines for J. Lewis, NLT, Travis Garland, Luhan (singer) and for Korean groups Big Bang (most notably Taeyang), 2NE1, Se7en, BTS, and Henry's 1st single, "Trap".Jeon Jungkook also stated that he trained with Movement Lifestyle before debut.

== Early life ==
Shaun Evaristo started dancing during his pre-teen years when he originally formed his first dance crew, Gen2, with his cousins and friends. Evaristo cites Janet Jackson's Velvet Rope Tour as an inspiration, saying "That show changed my life and so did the dancers." Also inspired by Michael Jackson and N'Sync, he and Gen2 began dancing in his garage and have constantly choreographed and performed routines together since then. After taking several dance classes through his teenage years, including tap and jazz, Shaun was exposed to his most influential genre and style today, hip-hop. Through his teenage years, he kept on creating and structuring dance routines and put on shows for his high school.

== Career ==
=== Choreography ===
After moving to North Hollywood, Shaun Evaristo was contacted by YG Entertainment to work for Korean pop group Big Bang. It was essentially the gateway to his professional dancing career. He, along with Kyle Beniga, choreographed and danced in BigBang member Tae Yang's hit music videos "Wedding Dress" and "I Need A Girl", as well as a few others. Through YG Entertainment, Shaun caught the attention of other popular Korean pop artists, G-Dragon and Se7en. This time, through Kanauru Productions, Shaun worked with Se7en to help them structure and choreograph a dance routine to his hit song "Drip", released in 2010.

Shaun had the opportunity to not only work with these popular Korean pop artists, but he also toured with Omarion in the United States and Canada. He has shot several music videos for international artists, but his first work with an artist from the United States was a music video-type commercial for Sears using High School Musical star, Vanessa Hudgens' song "Arrive". Shaun has most recently toured with Justin Bieber on his Believe Tour.

=== Dance workshops ===
Aside from choreographing for music artists, Shaun also makes his own dance pieces that he teaches at dance workshops for dancers who want to learn his material. His work has been showcased at several dance workshops around the world. Among these workshops lies the Urban Dance Camp in Germany, a dance intensive education workshop. Every year, UDC brings the world's best choreographers and street dancers to spread their talent to other dancers in a 28-day summer session. Dancers also get to showcase their work to the audience at the Urban Dance Showcase, in which Shaun performed in 2011.

Shaun has also paid a visit to the Broadway Dance Company in Tokyo, Japan. Like UDC, the Broadway Dance Company is a leader in dance education, but in the genre of jazz. It brings in world-class dancers and choreographers who are willing to teach new dance techniques to Asian students. He and his Movement Lifestyle colleague Lyle Beniga both taught as guests to the workshop in Japan.

=== Movement Lifestyle ===
Shaun Evaristo is founder and CEO of his choreography management company, Movement Lifestyle.
