= Competitive dance =

Activity where dancing is judged

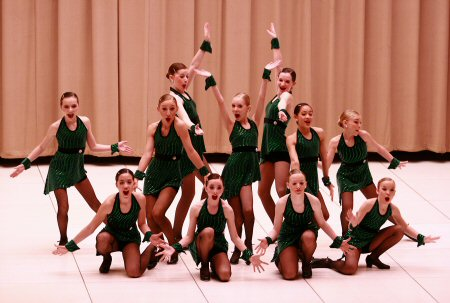
A dance group strikes an ending pose at the conclusion of their competitive performance. Groups such as this are typically formed from students in a dance class. The dancers in this image are members of a tap dance class.

Competitive dance is a popular, widespread sport in which competitors perform dances in any of several permitted dance styles—such as open, acro, ballet, contemporary, jazz, hip-hop, lyrical, modern, musical theatre, tap, and improv—before a panel of judges, typically with professional dance experience. This differs from other dance-related competitions based on specific styles or purposes, such as pom squad and dancesport (competitive ballroom dance).

The competitive dance industry largely consists of competition production companies (sometimes called dance competition companies or competition lines) that conduct regional competitions at stops along their annual, nationwide tours. Dancers who compete at these regional competitions are students typically ranging in age from five to eighteen. After competing regionally, qualifying routines and studios go on to compete nationally towards the end of their season. Dance schools (often referred to as dance studios or academies) arrange for their classes to compete in a range of disciplines as solos, duets, trios, or in a small group dance in addition to or in place of large group routines or lines or productions, used for larger groups of dancers. Competitions typically begin in January and end in July or August.

Competitive dancers must be physically fit because even short dances can be physically demanding. Dancers must continuously train to maintain and improve their technique, balance skills, strength and flexibility. Dance studios typically advise their students to avoid activities that put them at risk for injury or illness, especially while attending competitions.

Except for holidays and short breaks during the summer, competitive dancing is typically a year-round activity: dancers attend classes during competition season, to refine their competitive routines, and during off-season to prepare for the next upcoming competition season. Some dancers attend dance intensives during the summer to improve technique. These intensives normally last a few weeks and happen in various locations around the world. Intensives are typically very intense, as the dancers follow rigorous schedules. Days of twelve hours or more are extremely likely, as many classes and activities are crammed into each day.

== Competition ==
=== Dance music ===
The music used in competitive dance routines is typically adapted from commercially available songs created by professional recording artists or in the world of competitive ballet and musical theater can be performed by a live pianist or even a full band. Dance routines are subject to time limits at most dance competitions, and consequently the original, commercial music is usually edited to conform to such time limits.

=== Standards ===
There is no industry-wide standard for scoring, but awards are typically awarded in this order: Bronze, High Bronze, Silver, High Silver, Gold, High Gold, Platinum, High Platinum, and Diamond. The maximum number of points issued by each judge, as well as the maximum possible final score, varies among competition production companies. Although it is common for judges to issue a maximum of 100 points each, at least one company implements a system in which judges may issue up to 200 points, based on the rationale that such a scoring system is similar to that employed in public schools. Although scoring at dance competitions varies, judges usually give scores based on score technique, performance, costume, music, and difficulty level of the performance. Each competition's ranks are different. The performances are usually ranked within each dance category.

Most competitions have opportunities for dancers to win title positions. Titles include Mr. and Miss Dance for petites (ages commonly 8 and under), juniors (ages 9–11), teens (12–14), and seniors (15–19). These competitions normally include dancers who choose to pay an extra fee to run for title. Although these scoring systems vary from different dance competitions, most go along these basic rules.

== Competitions ==
=== Competitive dance industry ===
Dance competitions are organized and conducted by independent competition production companies, such as OneBeat Dance Brands. In 2007 there were at least 150 such companies operating in the United States and Canada alone. Competition production companies move from one metropolitan area to another, stopping for a few days in each area to conduct a regional competition. By touring in this manner, these companies are able to generate profits while at the same time enabling significant numbers of dancers to attend local competitions. Some companies also conduct one or more national competitions after their regional tours have ended.

The competitive dance industry has no oversight body or standards organization, although at least one effort was attempted to establish a limited set of competition rules and safety standards in the industry. Competition production companies seldom coordinate their tours with each other. Tour start and end dates, as well as cities visited, vary from one company to another. Most companies conduct regional tours from approximately January through May, while National competitions generally run from June through August. It is not uncommon for two regional tours to be visiting the same metropolitan area at the same time.

=== Competitive divisions ===
Dances and performers typically are categorized in various ways so as to create different competitive divisions. These categories are not standardized, and may vary significantly from one competition to another:

- Age – Each dancer is assigned to a particular age division, wherein each division encompasses a range of ages.
- Experience – Each dance is assigned to a particular competitive division based on performers' experience.
- Group size – Dances are also categorized according to the number of performers. Common categories include solo (one performer), duo/trio (two or three performers), small group (four-eight performers), large group (nine to around twenty performers), and line or production (twenty-one or more performers)

These divisions are intended to ensure that dancers will compete against others of the same age and experience, and similarly sized groups, and thus avoid unfair comparisons (e.g., beginner vs. advanced).

=== Videography and photography ===
The choreography of a dance routine—which is the design of movement and flow of steps in the routine—is copyrightable. Consequently, video recording is often prohibited at dance competitions in order to steer clear of copyright infringement issues. Nowadays, most competition companies take photos and videos for dance schools. When no professional videographer is available, competition production companies will sometimes permit each attending dance school to designate a videographer to record performances of students from that school.

Unlike videography, still photography does not infringe copyrighted choreography. Because of this, many competition production companies permit photography at their competitions. Virtually all competitions prohibit flash photography, however, both for the safety of performers and to prevent undesirable distractions. Some competition production companies employ professional photographers to capture and sell photographs of dance performances. Other competitions, such as Groove Dance Competition and Beyond The Stars, offer free photos and videos to registered competitors.

=== In popular culture ===
Dance competitions became more known to the public after the debut of the television show Dance Moms. Dance Moms featured a competitive dance studio and its dancers as these dancers attended regional and national competitions. Although the dancers competed in real competitions, the show presented a dramatized version of the real competitive dance world. They competed a different routine every competition, went to competitions on different continents, and competed a variety of new routines every single weekend. Many dance studios attend 5-10 competitions per year, typically performing the same routines throughout the season.

== See also ==
- Computational musicology
- List of dance organizations
- So You Think You Can Dance (American TV series)
- Dancing with the Stars (American TV series)
- America's Best Dance Crew (American TV series)
- International Dance League
- Electronic dance music
- Gospel music
- Rock music
- Soul music
