= Bangerz (disambiguation) =

Bangerz (2013) is the fourth studio album by American recording artist Miley Cyrus.

Bangerz may also refer to:

- Bangerz Tour (2014), the associated fourth concert tour by Cyrus
- "SMS (Bangerz)", the third track on Bangerz, featuring Britney Spears
- The Bangerz, a California DJ group and MTV's 2008 America's Best Dance Crew Champions

== See also ==
- Bangers (disambiguation)
- Bangor (disambiguation)
