= Bangor Township, Michigan =

Bangor Township, Michigan may refer to:

- Bangor Township, Bay County, Michigan
- Bangor Township, Van Buren County, Michigan

== See also ==
- Bangor, Michigan, a city in Van Buren County
- Bangor Township (disambiguation)
