= Bangor =

Bangor may refer to:

== Places ==
=== Australia ===
- Bangor, New South Wales
- Bangor, Tasmania

=== Canada ===
- Bangor, Nova Scotia
- Bangor, Saskatchewan

=== United Kingdom ===
==== Northern Ireland ====
- Bangor, County Down
  - Bangor railway station (Northern Ireland)
  - Bangor (Northern Ireland Parliament constituency), Bangor's former constituency in the Parliament of Northern Ireland
  - Bangor (Parliament of Ireland constituency), Bangor's former constituency in the Parliament of Ireland
  - Bangor (civil parish)

==== Wales ====
- Bangor, Gwynedd
  - Bangor railway station (Wales)
- Bangor Mountain, Gwynedd
- Bangor-on-Dee, Wrexham

=== United States ===
- Bangor, Alabama, an unincorporated community
- Bangor, California, a census-designated place
- Bangor, Iowa, an unincorporated community
- Bangor, Maine, a city
  - Bangor Air National Guard Base
  - Bangor International Airport
- Bangor, Michigan, a city
  - Bangor (Amtrak station)
- Bangor Township, Van Buren County, Michigan
- Bangor Township, Bay County, Michigan
- Bangor, New York, a town
- Bangor, Pennsylvania, a borough
- Bangor, Wisconsin, a village
- Bangor (town), Wisconsin
- Bangor Township (disambiguation)

=== Elsewhere ===
- Bangor, Morbihan, Brittany, France

== Sports ==
- 1st Bangor Old Boys F.C., a football club in Bangor, County Down, Northern Ireland
- Bangor Amateurs F.C., a football club in Bangor, County Down, Northern Ireland
- Bangor Swifts F.C., a football club in Bangor, County Down, Northern Ireland
- Bangor Young Men F.C., a football club in Bangor, County Down, Northern Ireland
- Bangor F.C., a football club in Bangor, County Down, Northern Ireland
- Bangor City F.C., a defunct football club in Bangor, Gwynedd
- Bangor City 1876 F.C., a football club in Bangor, Gwynedd
- Bangor RFC, a rugby union team in Bangor, Gwynedd

== Transportation ==
- Bangor International Airport, Maine, US
- Bangor railway station (Northern Ireland)
- Bangor railway station (Wales)
- Bangor station (Michigan), US

== Other uses ==
- Bangor Cathedral, Bangor, Gwynedd, Wales
- Bangor New Cemetery, Bangor, Northern Ireland
- Bangor University, Bangor, Gwynedd, Wales
- Bangor FM, County Down, a local radio station

== See also ==
- City of Bangor (disambiguation)
- Bangor Erris, County Mayo, Ireland
- Bangor-on-Dee (Welsh: Bangor-is-Coed or Bangor-is-y-Coed), Wrexham, Wales
- Bangor Teifi, Ceredigion, Wales
- Bangor Base, Washington, US, a census-designated place
- Bangor City Forest, Maine, US
- Bangor and Aroostook Railroad, Maine, US
- Bangor Mall, Maine, US
- The Bangor Aye, an independent online news service for Gwynedd, Wales
- Bagnor, a hamlet in England
- Banger (disambiguation)
