= Furlong =

Unit of length equal to 660 feet or about 201 metres

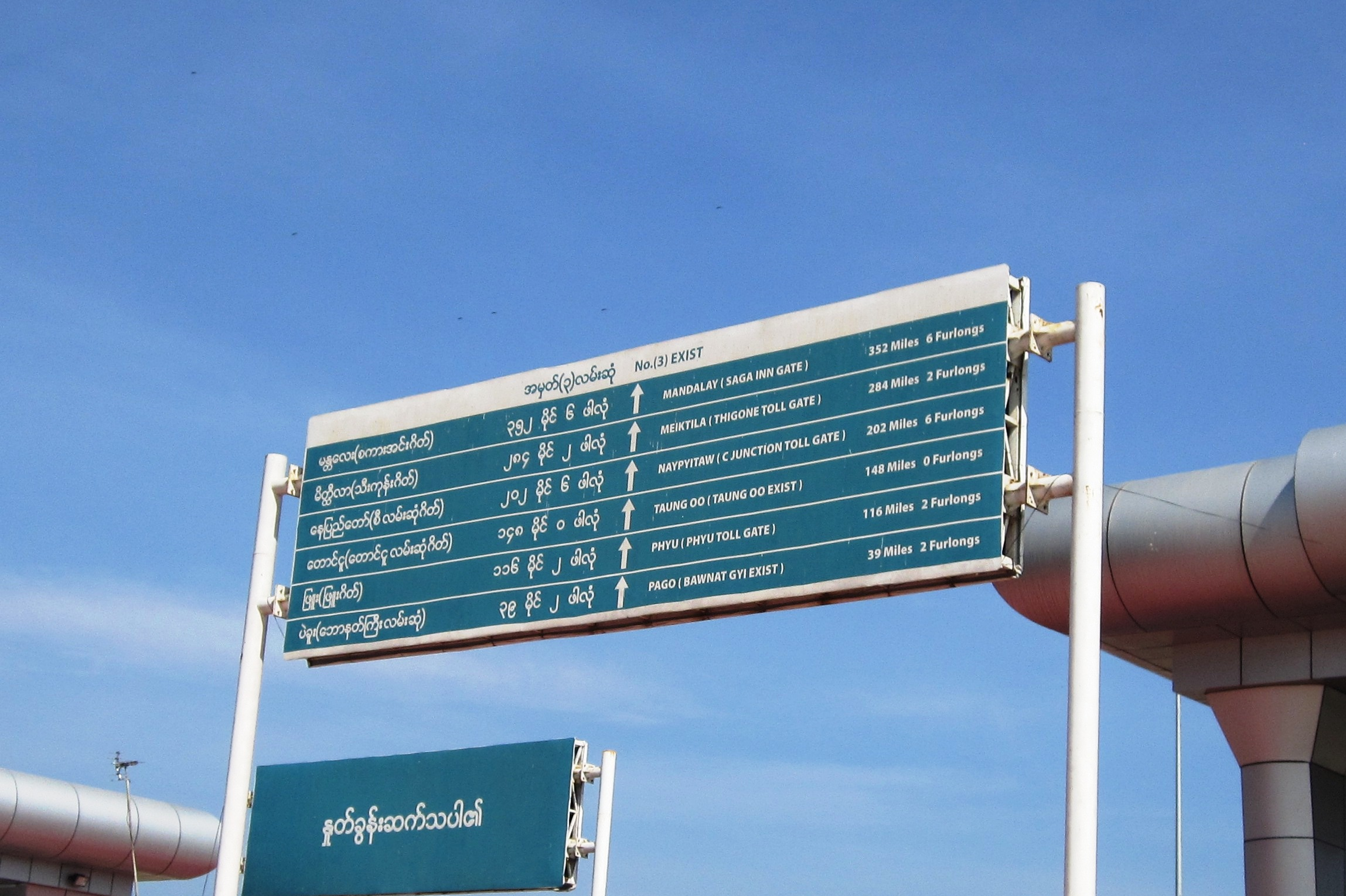
- Present-day use of furlongs on a highway sign near Yangon (Rangoon)

General information
- Unit system: imperial/US units
- Unit of: length
- Symbol: fur

Conversions
| 1 fur in ... | ... is equal to ... |
- imperial/US units: 220 yd or 1/8 mi
- metric (SI) units: 201.1680 m

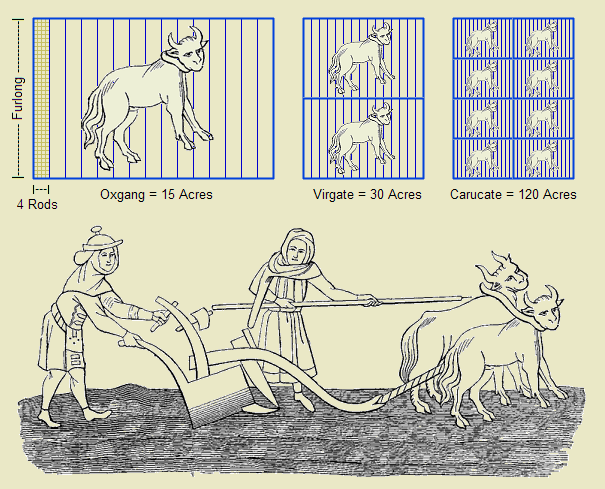
Farm-derived units of measurement: 1. The rod is a historical unit of length equal to 5 1/2 yards. It may have originated from the typical length of a mediaeval ox-goad. There are 4 rods in one chain.; 2. The furlong (meaning furrow length) was the distance a team of oxen could plough without resting. This was standardised to be exactly 40 rods or 10 chains.; 3. An acre was the amount of land tillable by one man behind one team of eight oxen in one day. Traditional acres were long and narrow due to the difficulty in turning the plough and the value of river front access.; 4. An oxgang was the amount of land tillable by one ox in a ploughing season. This could vary from village to village, but was typically around 15 acres.; 5. A virgate was the amount of land tillable by two oxen in a ploughing season.; 6. A carucate was the amount of land tillable by a team of eight oxen in a ploughing season. This was equal to 8 oxgangs or 4 virgates.

A furlong (abbreviated fur) is a measure of distance in imperial units and United States customary units equal to one-eighth of a mile, equivalent to any of 660 feet, 220 yards, 40 rods or perches, 10 chains, or approximately 201 metres. It is now mostly confined to use in horse racing, where in many countries it is the standard measurement of race lengths, and agriculture, where it is used to measure rural field lengths and distances specifically in the United Kingdom, Ireland, Canada, and the United States.

In the United States, some states use older definitions for surveying purposes, leading to variations in the length of the furlong of two parts per million, or about 0.4 millimetres (1/64 inch). This variation is small enough to not have practical consequences in most applications.

Using the international definition of the yard as exactly 0.9144 metres, one furlong is 201.168 metres, and five furlongs is about 1 kilometre (1.00584 km exactly).

== History ==
The name furlong derives from the Old English words furh (furrow) and lang (long). Dating back at least to early Anglo-Saxon times, it originally referred to the length of the furrow in one acre of a ploughed open field (a medieval communal field which was divided into strips). The furlong (meaning furrow length) was the distance a team of oxen could plough without resting. This was standardised to be exactly 40 rods or 10 chains. The system of long furrows arose because turning a team of oxen pulling a heavy plough was difficult. This offset the drainage advantages of short furrows and meant furrows were made as long as possible. An acre is an area that is one furlong long and one chain (66 feet or 22 yards) wide. For this reason, the furlong was once also called an acre's length, though in modern usage an area of one acre can be of any shape. The term furlong, or shot, was also used to describe a grouping of adjacent strips within an open field.

Among the early Anglo-Saxons, the rod was the fundamental unit of land measurement. A furlong was 40 rods; an acre 4 by 40 rods, or 4 rods by 1 furlong, and thus 160 square rods; there are 10 acres in a square furlong. At the time, the Saxons used the North German foot, which was about 10 percent longer than the foot of the international 1959 agreement. When England changed to a shorter foot in the late 13th century, rods and furlongs remained unchanged, since property boundaries were already defined in rods and furlongs. The only thing that changed was the number of feet and yards in a rod or a furlong, and the number of square feet and square yards in an acre. The definition of the rod went from 15 old feet to 16 1/2 new feet, or from 5 old yards to 5 1/2 new yards. The furlong went from 600 old feet to 660 new feet, or from 200 old yards to 220 new yards. The acre went from 36,000 old square feet to 43,560 new square feet, or from 4,000 old square yards to 4,840 new square yards.

The furlong was historically viewed as being equivalent to the Roman stade (stadium). (Note: Compare Josephus, Antiquities (15.11.3), who writes of the Temple Mount in Jerusalem that it was encompassed by a wall which measured one stadion (Gr. στάδιον) to each angle, a word translated in English as "furlong".)

In the Roman system, there were 625 feet to the stadium, eight stadia to the mile, and 1½ miles to the league. A league was considered to be the distance a man could walk in one hour, and the mile (from mille, meaning "thousand") consisted of 1,000 passus (paces, five feet, or double-step).

After the fall of the Western Roman Empire, medieval Europe continued with the Roman system, which the people proceeded to diversify, leading to serious complications in trade, taxation, etc. Around the year 1300, by royal decree, England standardized a long list of measures. Among the important units of distance and length at the time were the foot, yard, rod (or pole), furlong, and the mile. The rod was defined as 5 1/2 yards or 16 1/2 feet, and the mile was eight furlongs, so the definition of the furlong became 40 rods and that of the mile became 5,280 feet (eight furlongs/mile times 40 rods/furlong times 16 1/2 feet/rod). The invention of the measuring chain in the 1620s led to the introduction of an intermediate unit of length, the chain of 22 yards, being equal to four rods, and to one-tenth of a furlong.

A description from 1675 states, "Dimensurator or Measuring Instrument whereof the mosts usual has been the Chain, and the common length for English Measures four Poles, as answering indifferently to the Englishs Mile and Acre, 10 such Chains in length making a Furlong, and 10 single square Chains an Acre, so that a square Mile contains 640 square Acres."

The official use of the furlong was abolished in the United Kingdom under the Weights and Measures Act 1985, an act that also abolished the official use of many other traditional units of measurement.

== Use ==
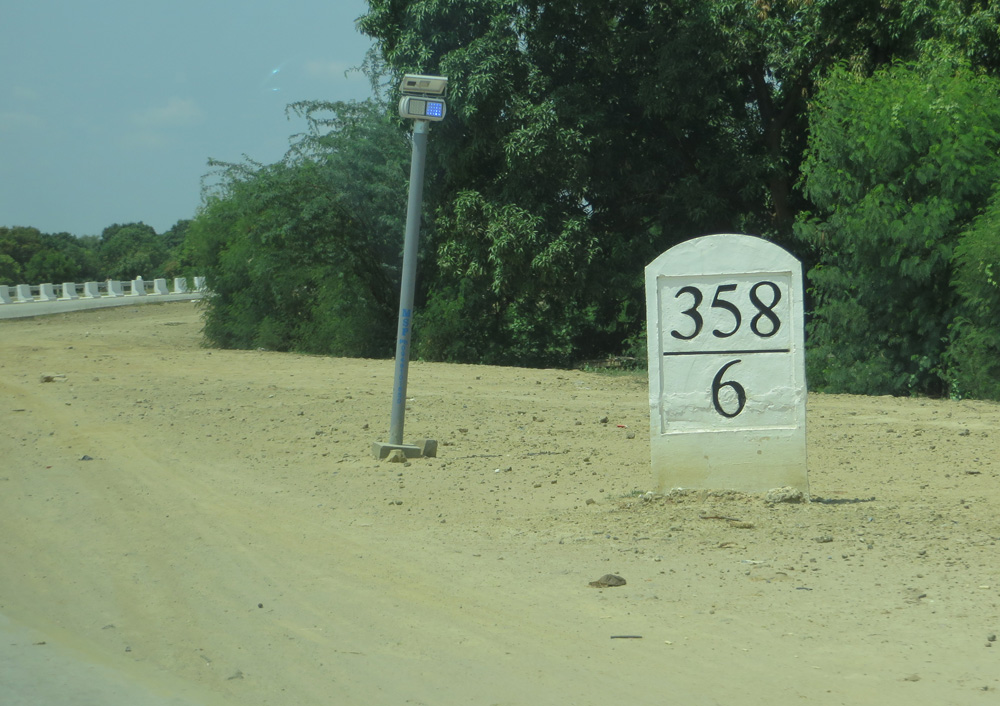
Mileposts on the Yangon–Mandalay Expressway use miles followed by furlongs

In Myanmar furlongs are currently used in conjunction with miles to indicate distances on highway signs. Mileposts on the Yangon–Mandalay Expressway use miles and furlongs.

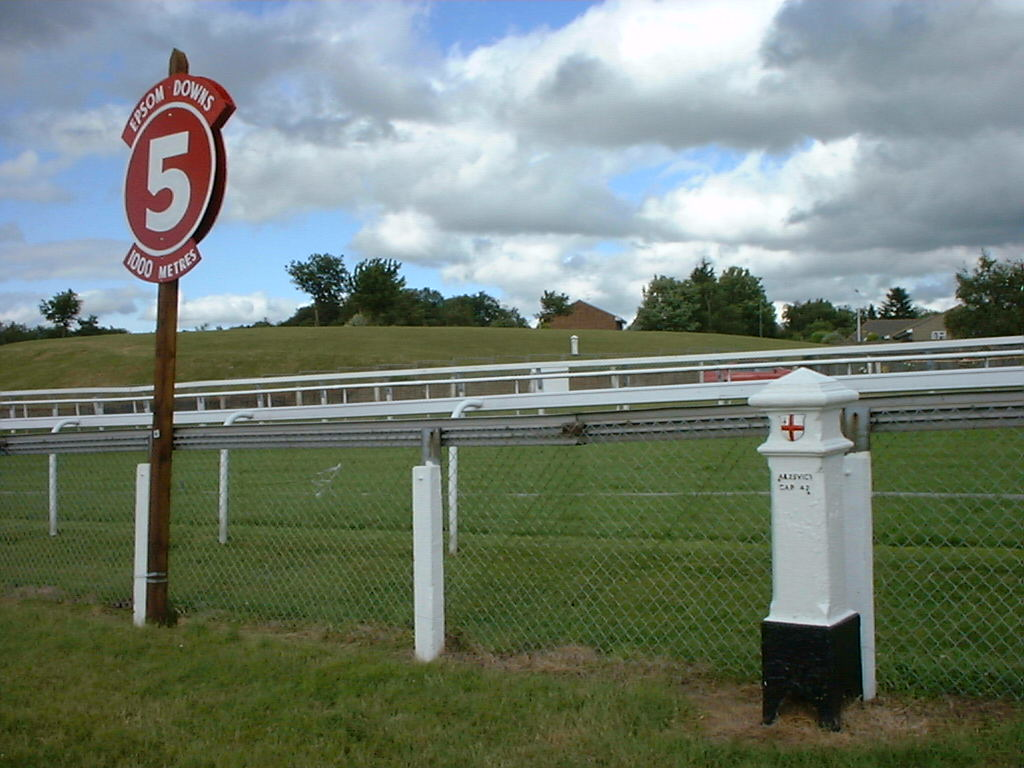
The five-furlong (1000 m) post on Epsom Downs Racecourse

In the rest of the world the furlong has very limited use, with the notable exception of horse racing in most English-speaking countries, including Canada and the United States. The distances for horse racing in Australia were converted to metric in 1972 and the term survives only in slang. In the United Kingdom, Ireland, Canada, and the United States, races are still given in miles and furlongs. Also distances along English canals navigated by narrowboats are commonly expressed in miles and furlongs.

The city of Chicago's street numbering system allots a measure of 800 address units to each mile, in keeping with the city's system of eight blocks per mile. This means that every block in a typical Chicago neighborhood (in either north–south or east–west direction but rarely both) is approximately one furlong in length. City blocks in the Hoddle Grid of Melbourne are also one furlong in length. Salt Lake City's blocks are each a square furlong in the downtown area. The blocks become less regular in shape farther from the center, but the numbering system (800 units to each mile) remains the same everywhere in Salt Lake County. Blocks in central Logan, Utah, and in large sections of Phoenix, Arizona, are similarly a square furlong in extent (eight to a mile, which explains the series of freeway exits: 19th Ave, 27th, 35th, 43rd, 51st, 59th ...).

Much of Ontario, Canada, was originally surveyed on a ten-furlong grid, with major roads being laid out along the grid lines. Now that distances are shown on road signs in kilometres, these major roads are almost exactly two kilometres apart. The exits on highways running through Toronto, for example, are generally at intervals of two kilometres.

The Bangor City Forest in Bangor, Maine has its trail system marked in miles and furlongs.

The furlong is also a base unit of the humorous FFF system of units.

== Definition of length ==
The exact length of the furlong varies slightly among English-speaking countries. In Canada and the United Kingdom, which define the furlong in terms of the international yard of exactly 0.9144 metres, a furlong is 201.168 m. Australia does not formally define the furlong, but it does define the chain and link in terms of the international yard.

The United States previously defined the furlong, chain, rod, and link in terms of the U.S. survey foot of exactly 1200/3937 metre, resulting in a furlong approximately 201.1684 m long. The difference of approximately two parts per million between the old U.S. value and the "international" value was insignificant for most practical measurements.

In October 2019, U.S. National Geodetic Survey and National Institute of Standards and Technology announced their joint intent to retire the U.S. survey foot, with effect from the end of 2022. The furlong in U.S. Customary units is thereafter defined based on the International 1959 foot, giving the length of the furlong as exact 201.168 meters in the United States as well.
