= FFF system =

Humorous system of units

The furlong–firkin–fortnight (FFF) system is a humorous system of units based on unusual or impractical measurements. The length unit of the system is the furlong, the mass unit is the mass of a firkin of water, and the time unit is the fortnight. Like the SI or metre–kilogram–second systems, there are derived units for velocity, volume, mass and weight, etc. It is sometimes referred to as the FFFF system where the fourth 'F' is degrees Fahrenheit for temperature.

While the FFF system is not used in practice, it has been used as an example in discussions of the relative merits of different systems of units. Some of the FFF units, notably the microfortnight, have been used jokingly in computer science. The derived unit furlongs per fortnight has served frequently in classroom examples of unit conversion and dimensional analysis.

== Base units and definitions ==
Unit	Abbreviation	Dimension	SI unit	Imperial unit
furlong	fur	length	201.168 m	220 yards
firkin	fir	mass	40.8233133 kg	90 lb (Note: The firkin of the FFF System is defined as the mass of an imperial firkin (9 imp gal) of water. The imperial gallon was originally defined as the volume of 10 lb of distilled water (weighed according to specific conditions). From this definition a density of 10 lb/imp gal is derived, giving the firkin of water a mass of 90 lb.)
fortnight	ftn	time	1,209,600 s	14 days

== Multiples and derived units ==
=== Microfortnight and other decimal prefixes ===
One microfortnight is equal to 1.2096 seconds. This has become a joke in computer science because in the VMS operating system, the TIMEPROMPTWAIT variable, which holds the time the system will wait for an operator to set the correct date and time at boot if it realizes that the current value is invalid, is set in microfortnights. This is because the computer uses a loop instead of the internal clock, which has not been activated yet to run the timer. The documentation notes that "[t]he time unit of micro-fortnights is approximated as seconds in the implementation".

The Jargon File reports that the millifortnight (about 20 minutes) and nanofortnight have been occasionally used.

=== Furlong per fortnight ===
One furlong per fortnight is a speed that would be barely noticeable to the naked eye. It converts to:

- 1.663×10^{−4} m/s, (i.e. 0.1663 mm/s)
- roughly 1 cm/min (to within 1 part in 400) (Note: Indeed, if the inch were defined as 2.5454... cm, it would be 1 cm/min)
- 5.987×10^{−4} km/h
- roughly 3/8 in/min
- 3.720×10^{−4} mph
- the speed of the tip of a 3 3/4 inch minute hand

=== Speed of light ===
The speed of light is 1.8026×10^{12} furlongs per fortnight (1.8026 terafurlongs per fortnight). By mass–energy equivalence, 1 firkin is equal to 3.24936676×10^{24} firkin·furlong^{2}/fortnight^{2} (≈ 3.478×10^{15} BTU, or 3.669×10^{18} joules).

=== Others ===
In the FFF system, heat transfer coefficients are conventionally reported as BTU per foot-fathom per degree Fahrenheit per fortnight. (Note: The foot-fathom is a unit of area; 1 foot-fathom is equal to 6 square feet.) Thermal conductivity has units of BTU per fortnight per furlong per degree Fahrenheit.

The furlong per fortnight and firkin per fortnight can refer to "any obscure unit".

== See also ==
- List of unusual units of measurement
- List of humorous units of measurement
