= Fortnight =

Time period of two weeks

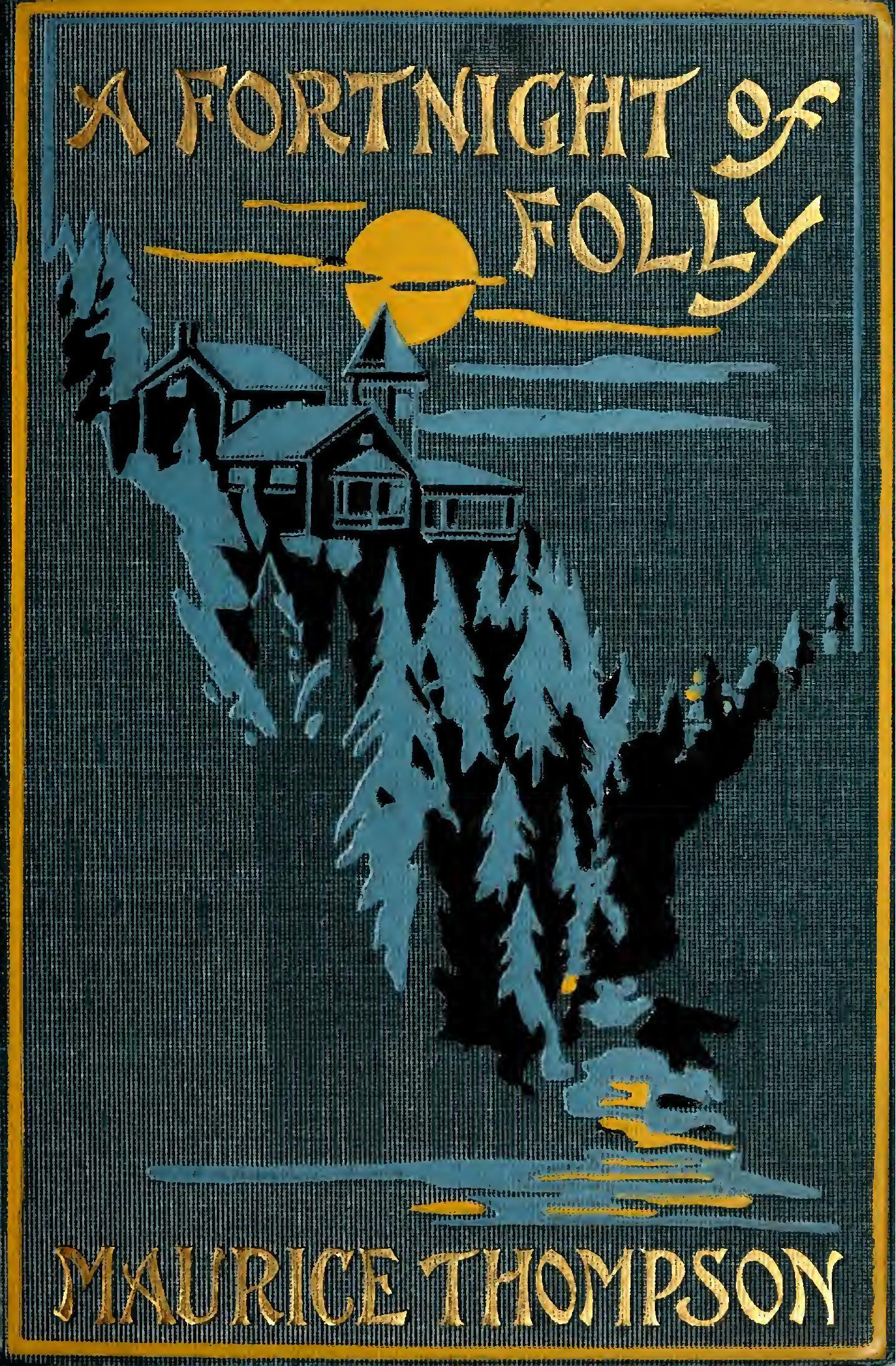
The term "fortnight" being used in an 1888 novel title by Maurice Thompson (1902 cover pictured)

A fortnight is a unit of time equal to 14 days (two weeks). The word derives from the Old English term fēowertīene niht, meaning "fourteen nights" (or "fourteen days", since the Anglo-Saxons counted by nights).

== Astronomy and tides ==
In astronomy, a lunar fortnight is half a lunar synodic month, which is equivalent to the mean period between a full moon and a new moon (and vice versa). This is equal to 14.77 days. It gives rise to a lunar fortnightly tidal constituent (see: Long-period tides).

== Analogs and translations ==
In many languages, there is no single word for a two-week period, and the equivalent terms "two weeks", "14 days", or "15 days" (counting inclusively) have to be used.

- Celtic languages: in Welsh, the term pythefnos, meaning "15 nights", is used. This is in keeping with the Welsh term for a week, which is wythnos ("eight nights"). In Irish, the term is coicís.
- Similarly, in Greek, the term δεκαπενθήμερο (dekapenthímero), meaning "15 days", is used.
- The Hindu calendar uses the Sanskrit word पक्ष "pakṣa", meaning one half of a lunar month, which is between 14 and 15 solar days.
- In Romance languages there are the terms quincena (or quince días) in Galician and Spanish, quinzena or quinze dies in Catalan and quinze dias or quinzena in Portuguese, quindicina in Italian, quinze jours or quinzaine in French, and chenzină in Romanian, all meaning "a grouping of 15".
- Semitic languages have a "doubling suffix". When added at the end of the word for "week" it changes the meaning to "two weeks". In Hebrew, the single-word שבועיים (shvu′ayim) means exactly "two weeks". Also in Arabic, by adding the common dual suffix to the word for "week", أسبوع, the form أسبوعين (usbu′ayn), meaning "two weeks", is formed.
- Slavic languages: in Czech the terms čtrnáctidenní and dvoutýdenní have the same meaning as "fortnight". In Ukrainian, the term два тижні is used in relation to "biweekly, two weeks".

== See also ==
- FFF system
- Half-month
- Sennight
- Ides (idus), Roman day for the midst of a month.
