= Banger =

Banger or Bangers may refer to:

== Film and television ==
- Bangers (1995 film), a Philippine comedy film
- Bangers (1999 film), an Australian short film
- Banger Films, a production company
- "Bangers" (The Apprentice), a 2010 television episode

== Noise makers ==
- Firecracker, a small, explosive noise maker
- Thundersticks, plastic balloons that are used as noise makers

== People ==
- Edgar Henry Banger (1897–1968), British illustrator
- Nicky Banger (born 1971), British footballer

== Songs ==
- "Banger" (song), a song by JME
- "The Banger", a song by Nigerian artist Runtown
- Banger, slang for a popular song with a heavy beat

== Other uses ==
- Banger (car), a decrepit vehicle
- Sausage ("bangers" in the UK), often served with mash (mashed potatoes)
- Bangalore torpedo, an explosive charge used by combat engineers
- Banger, a pickleball player that returns most balls using a hard drive

== See also ==
- Bangerz (disambiguation)
- Bangor (disambiguation)
