= Jabbawockeez =

American hip-hop dance crew

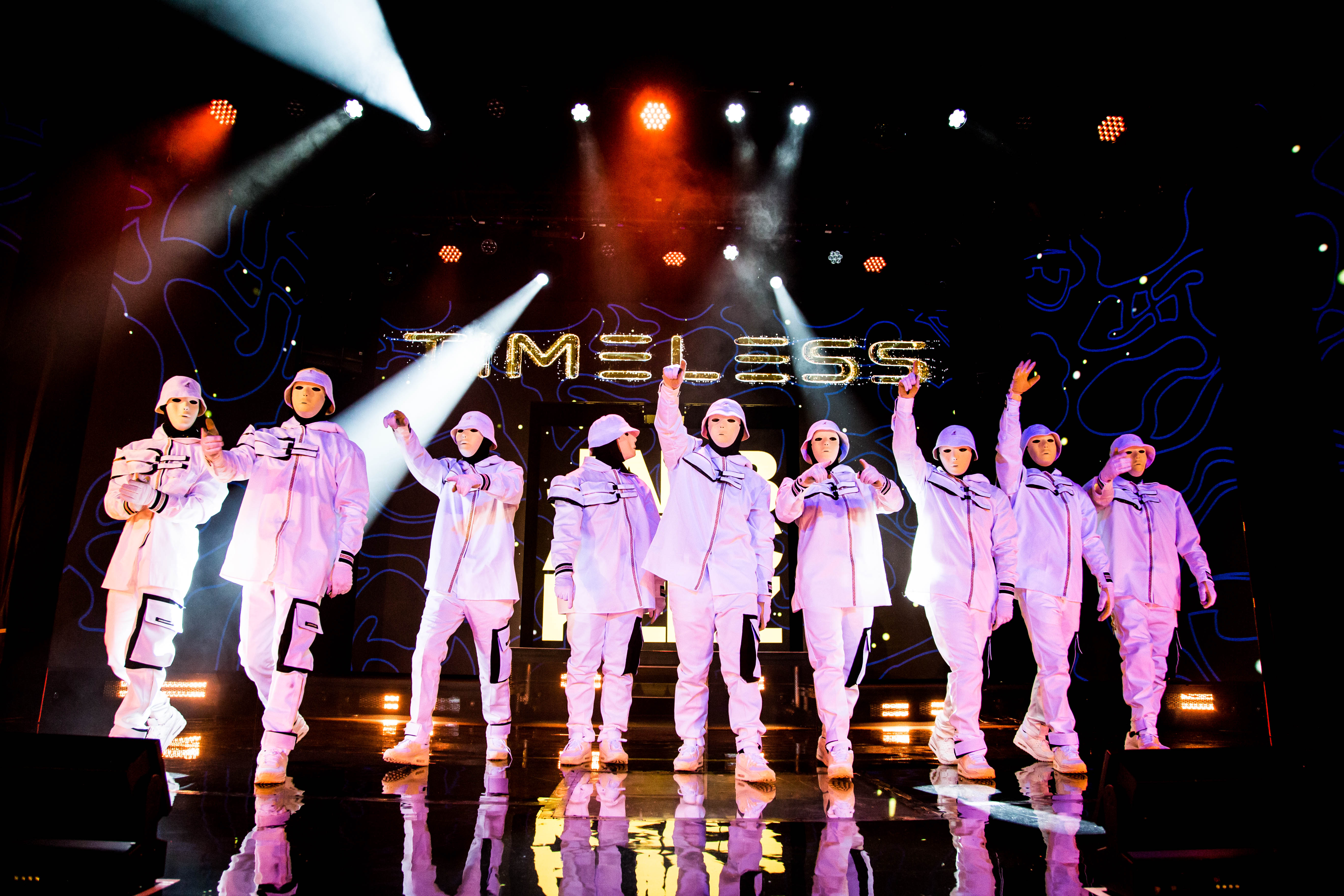
- Jabbawockeez performing "Timeless" at MGM Grand in Las Vegas, NV.

Background information
- Also known as: JBWKZ, JBWKZ Productions
- Origin: San Diego, California, U.S.
- Genres: Hip-hop dance, B-boying, popping
- Years active: 2003–present
- Labels: JBWKZ Records; Manager- Nick Ngo; Key Dove 8 Entertainment
- Members: Kevin "KB" Brewer; Joe "Punkee" Larot; Jeff "Phi" Nguyen; Rynan "Kid Rainen" Paguio
- Past members: Gary "Gee One" Kendell; Chris "Christyle" Gatdula; Ben "B-Tek" Chung; Phil "Swagger Boy" Tayag; Eddie "Eddie Styles" Gutierrez; Saso "King Saso" Jimenez; Randy "DJ Wish One" Bernal; Brian “Ong Kong” Ong
- Website: www.jbwkz.com

The Jabbawockeez is an American hip-hop dance crew that rose to prominence as the winner of the first season of America's Best Dance Crew in 2008. The group was established in 2003 in San Diego, California, by dancers Kevin "KB" Brewer and Joe Larot. They participated in dance competitions with the idea of striking a balance between dancing to the music, and dancing as an artistic expression.

By 2004, the Jabbawockeez's members included Gary "Gee One" Kendell, Randy "DJ Wish One" Bernal, Phil "Swagger Boy" Tayag, Ben "B-Tek" Chung, Kevin "KB" Brewer, Chris "Cristyle" Gatdula, Rynan "Kid Rainen" Paguio, and Jeff "Phi" Nguyen. Tony "Transformer" Tran joined the crew in 2013. The Jabbawockeez does not have a group leader; choreography for their performances, as well as music, design choices, is made as a collective unit.

== History ==
=== Early career ===
The dancers began performing wearing ski masks and gloves. The mask and glove motif was adopted as a tribute to the 1990s San Francisco strutting crew Medea Sirkas. Gary "Gee One" Kendell and Randy "DJ Wish One" Bernal were both members of the MindTricks dance crew who were active in the San Francisco Bay Area. Jeff "Phi" Nguyen explains, "There's no lead dancer in our crew. Our philosophy is that when you watch us perform, you have to watch us as a whole... When we put [the masks] on, it's not about who we are or where we came from. We're all one." The name Jabbawockeez, coined by Joe Larot, was inspired by the fantastical monster from the Lewis Carroll nonsense poem "Jabberwocky". Over time, the group switched to their signature white masks and gloves which better fit their persona and image. In San Diego, through Gary's connections, the Jabbawockeez added b-boys Rynan "Kid Rainen" Paguio and Chris "Cristyle" Gatdula to the group. The original eight-member iteration of the Jabbawockeez began performing as a group in 2004. This lineup consisted of Gary, Randy, Phi, Phil, Kevin, Joe, Rynan, and Chris.

Jabbawockeez rounded out their numbers with additional members, bringing their total to 11. Phoenix native Jeff "Phi" Nguyen had met Rynan Paguio at various Los Angeles area auditions and performances and earned a spot in the Jabbawockeez in 2004 by battling Kevin Brewer. The Jabbawockeez also brought Kaba Modern alumnus Ben "B-Tek" Chung and b-boys Eddie "Eddiestyles" Gutierrez and Saso "Saso Fresh" Jimenez into the fold. Stylistically, the Jabbawockeez style of dance features an eclectic mix of various urban styles, primarily popping and b-boying, along with a careful synchronicity to self-created instrumentals which one member dubs "Beat-Kune-Do" (a play on the word "Jeet Kune Do", a martial arts style created by Bruce Lee). In 2007, the Jabbawockeez appeared on the second season of America's Got Talent. Performing with nine members, the group was eliminated in the Las Vegas callbacks episode. In 2008, they auditioned and were accepted onto the first season of America's Best Dance Crew.

=== America's Best Dance Crew ===
The Jabbawockeez auditioned as a seven-member contingent for the first season of America's Best Dance Crew (ABDC), because of crew member limits imposed by the show. Originally, the ABDC group was supposed to consist of Gary Kendell, Phil Tayag, Kevin Brewer, Joe Larot, Rynan Paguio, Chris Gatdula, and Phi Nguyen; however, when Gary died that year, and Joe suffered a knee injury during the audition rounds, the group chose Ben Chung to replace Joe on the show and left Gary's spot vacant, proceeding with six members. They eventually went on to become the winners of the show. The win earned the crew $100,000 (USD).

=== Years after ABDC ===
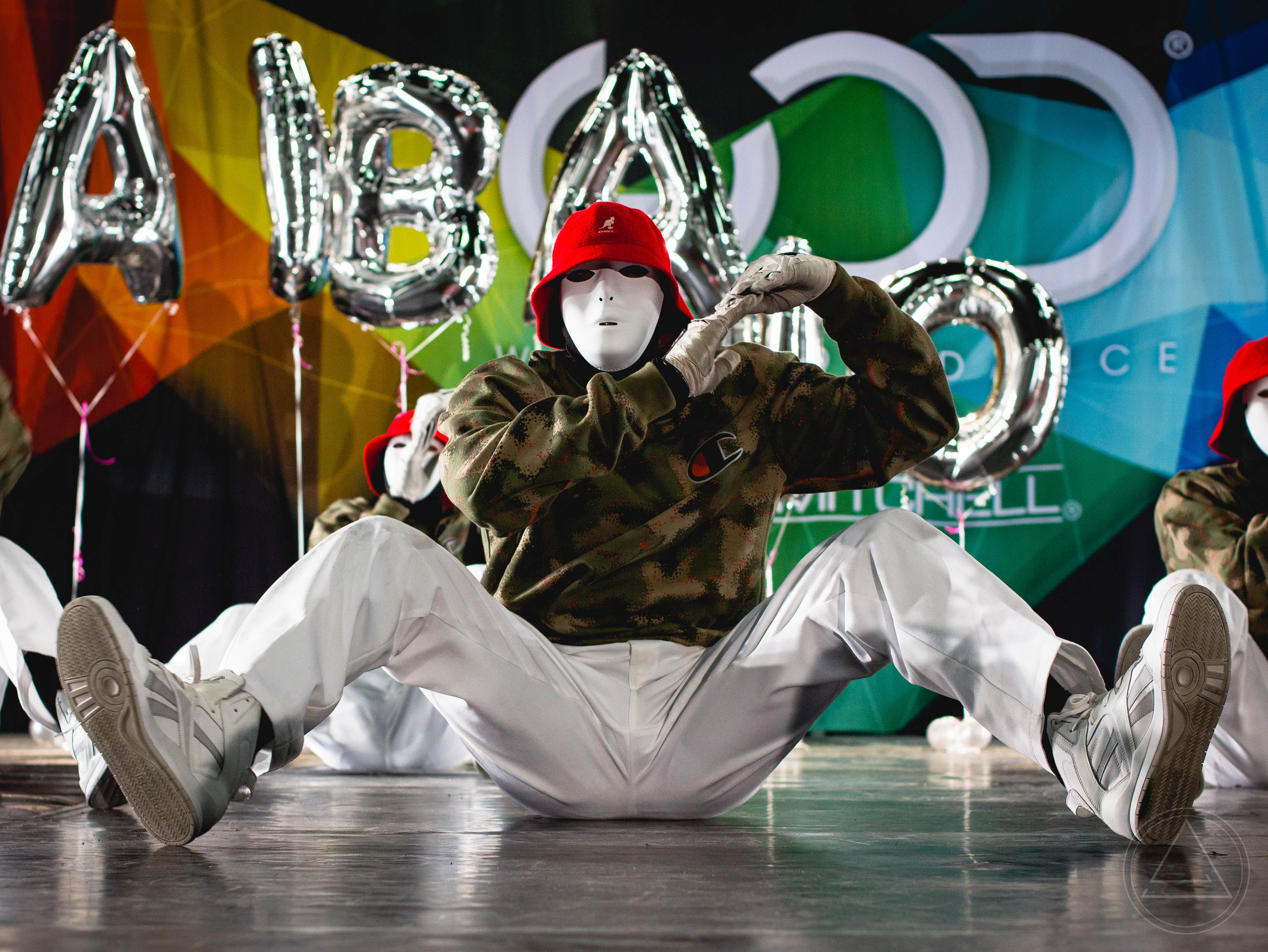
Jabbawockeez performing with their trademark white masks

Since ABDC, the Jabbawockeez have appeared in Pepsi, Ford, and Gatorade commercials, and performed on Dancing with the Stars, So You Think You Can Dance, The Ellen DeGeneres Show, and Live with Regis and Kelly. They also made a cameo appearance in Step Up 2 The Streets, launched their own clothing line, and toured with New Kids on the Block, and Jesse McCartney. Along with the ABDC season two winner, Super Cr3w, Jabbawockeez were the opening act for the Battle of the VMAs ABDC special. The group made an appearance on Cycle 13 of America's Next Top Model in the episode "Dance With Me" to help the contestants learn how to convey emotions with their bodies. They starred in Shake It Up, a Disney Channel comedy show. On February 15, 2009, they accompanied and danced with NBA All-Star center Shaquille O'Neal in his NBA All-Star Game player introduction. On October 16, 2009, they performed in front of a crowd of 35,000 at the University of Florida's Gator Growl. They performed for DECA's 66th Annual International Career Development Conference in Salt Lake City. Jabbawockeez returned to America's Best Dance Crew on June 5, 2011, to perform on the Season 6 finale. On May 19, 2013, they were backup dancers for Taylor Swift's performance at the 2013 Billboard Music Awards. They appeared in Season 7, Episode 2 of The Bachelorette with Ashley Hebert. They starred in DaBaby's "BOP on Broadway" music video in 2020. They are featured on NBA 2K23 as a part of the halftime show.

=== Australia tour ===
The Jabbawockeez toured Australia from August 28 to 30, 2009. The three-day tour was for Australian fans who were unable to see the crew due to the cancellation of the Australian leg of New Kids on the Block's Full Service Tour. The group performed in Sydney, Melbourne, and Brisbane and made several appearances on MTV Iggy.

=== Las Vegas shows ===
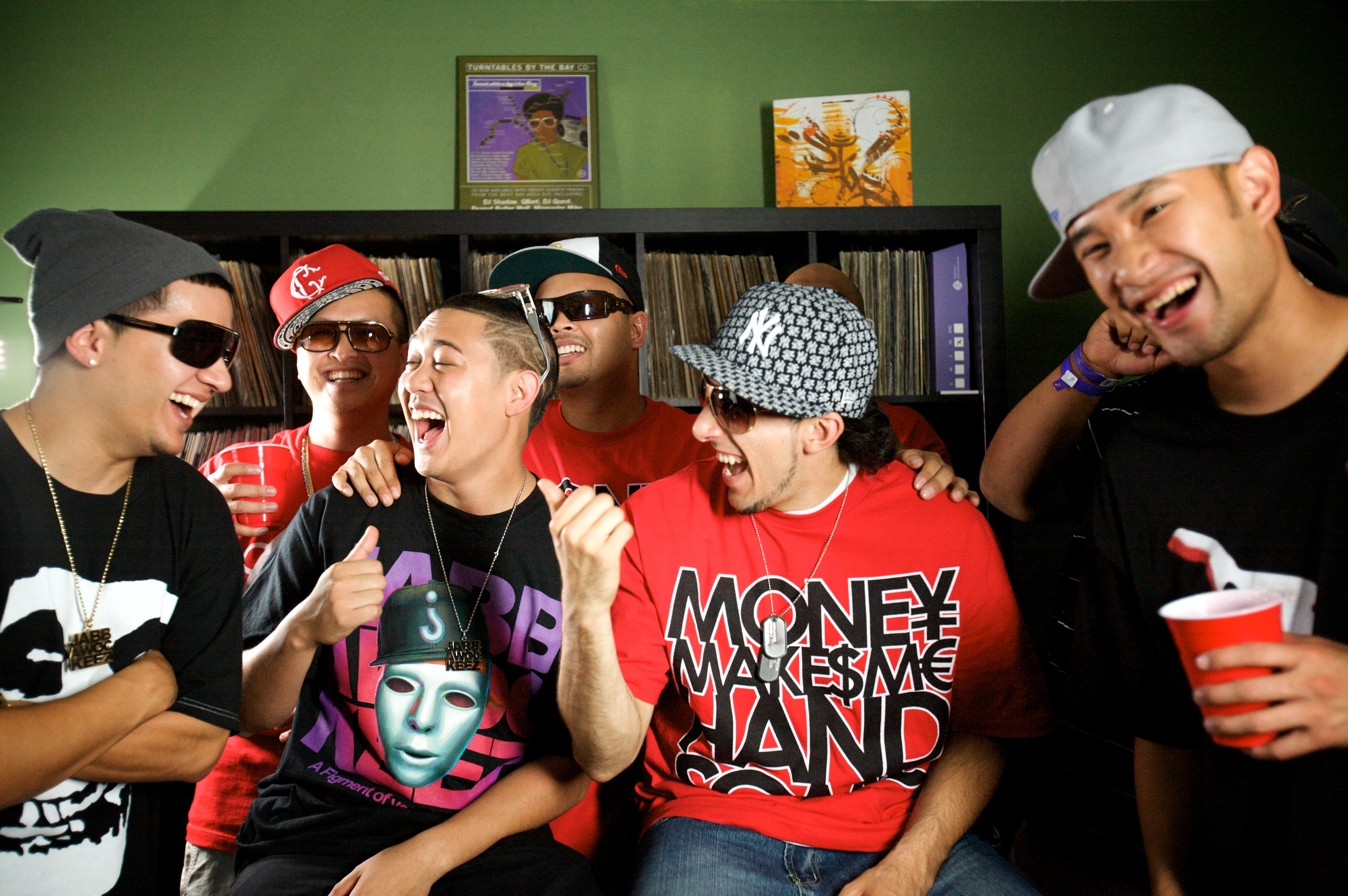
Members of the Jabbawockeez with DJ collective The Bangerz

On May 7, 2010, the Jabbawockeez were brought to Las Vegas to perform a personal audition to Felix Rappaport (MGM President) to produce and debut their own live stage show called MÜS.I.C at the Monte Carlo Resort and Casino in Las Vegas. They are the first dance crew to headline a show in Las Vegas. The show included members of Super Cr3w, the winners of season two of America's Best Dance Crew. Music for the show was produced by DJ collective The Bangerz and their costumes were designed by Kara Saun. Although scheduled to end in June, the show was later extended through August. Since its initial run, the show has moved to the Jupiters Hotel and Casino in Gold Coast, Queensland, Australia. They moved to the Luxor Hotel and Casino for their new show PRiSM in May 2013. PRiSM was housed in a brand new 850-seat theater and a mural of the crew is painted in the lobby by performance artist David Garibaldi. In November 2015, The Jabbawockeez started performing their show called "JREAMZ" at the MGM Grand. In February 2020, Jabbawockeez announced the arrival of their latest production, "TIMELESS," which replaced JREAMZ in the Jabbawockeez Theater at MGM Grand. Coming out of the pandemic in 2021, the Jabbawockeez took over the MGM Grand Garden with their "TIMELESS" production for a temporary residency hitting 90,000 in attendance. The show later returned to the Jabbawockeez Theater and in 2024 was named Best Show in Las Vegas by USA Today, solidifying Jabbawockeez’s status as one of the top theatrical productions on the Strip. In October 2025, the crew signed a long-term extension with MGM Grand and debuted their fifth production titled "FREQNCY" at the Jabbawockeez Theater.

=== JBWKZ Records ===
JBWKZ Records, the company's official record label, was founded to create and distribute their own music. Becoming the first of its kind, JBWKZ Records uniquely became the first record label to create music specifically made for dancers. In 2010, the label signed San Jose-based production group The Bangerz. The production group built a close-knit relationship with the crew, and released their first joint-single entitled “Robot Remains.” The single quickly became one of the Jabbawockeez most iconic records, being closely tied to one of the dance crew's most notable dance pieces.

The Bangerz continued an ongoing relationship with the crew, and worked closely with them on multiple albums. In 2010, The Bangerz and Jabbawockeez produced Mus.I.C - The Album, which was composed entirely of music used to score the Mus.I.C live Jabbawockeez Show in Las Vegas. In 2013, The Bangerz followed up with Prism - The Album to accompany the crew's second Las Vegas production, Prism. In 2015, The Bangerz went on to produce the Movement album. The album's lead single, "Two Step", ended up reaching 8.5+ million views in its accompanied "Two Step Challenge" video. In 2019, the label signed producer and dancer TJ Lewis. He went on to release singles "Focus" and "Jabba the Dawn". In 2020, the Bangerz and TJ Lewis are continuing to work with JBWKZ Records, and have scored the most recent soundtrack for the Jabbawockeez production of "TIMELESS".

=== Master of None ===
The Jabbawockeez appeared in the season two episode "Dinner Party" on Master of None, the Netflix series starring Aziz Ansari. In the episode, the Jabbawockeez are guest judges on the series's fictional TV program Clash of the Cupcakes, in which Ansari's character is frustrated they will not remove their masks to taste the cupcakes.

=== Halloween Horror Nights ===
The group appeared as part of Universal Studios Hollywood's Halloween Horror Nights nighttime events from 2015 to 2022.

== Awards and honors ==
The Jabbawockeez first rose to national prominence in 2008 when they won the inaugural season of America’s Best Dance Crew on MTV. That same year, they were named Favorite Reality TV Star at the Asian Excellence Awards, where they also performed alongside fellow finalists Kaba Modern.

In 2010, the group made history as the first dance crew to headline a Las Vegas show, debuting MÜS.I.C. at the Monte Carlo Resort and Casino. Their continued success led to an extended Las Vegas residency, with shows such as PRiSM, JREAMZ, and TIMELESS earning critical acclaim and solidifying their reputation as pioneers in theatrical hip-hop dance.

The Jabbawockeez were the first dance crew to receive the Living Legend of Hip Hop Award from Hip Hop International in 2012. The following year, they were honored with a Lifetime Achievement Award at the Set It Off Competition, which they accepted via video while introducing rising talent BabyWockee.

In 2021, they were awarded Best Dance at the 11th Annual Streamy Awards, celebrating their excellence in digital dance content. In 2022, they were inducted into the Las Vegas Magazine Hall of Fame in recognition of their lasting impact on the city's entertainment industry. Most recently, in 2024, their production TIMELESS at the MGM Grand was named Best Show in Las Vegas by USA Today.

The Jabbawockeez have also achieved major digital milestones. They received YouTube’s Gold Creator Award after surpassing 1 million subscribers on their official channel, JABBAWOCKEEZ OFFICIAL. As of 2025, the channel has grown to nearly 6 million subscribers and over 700 million views, underscoring their global influence through digital platforms.

== Gallery ==
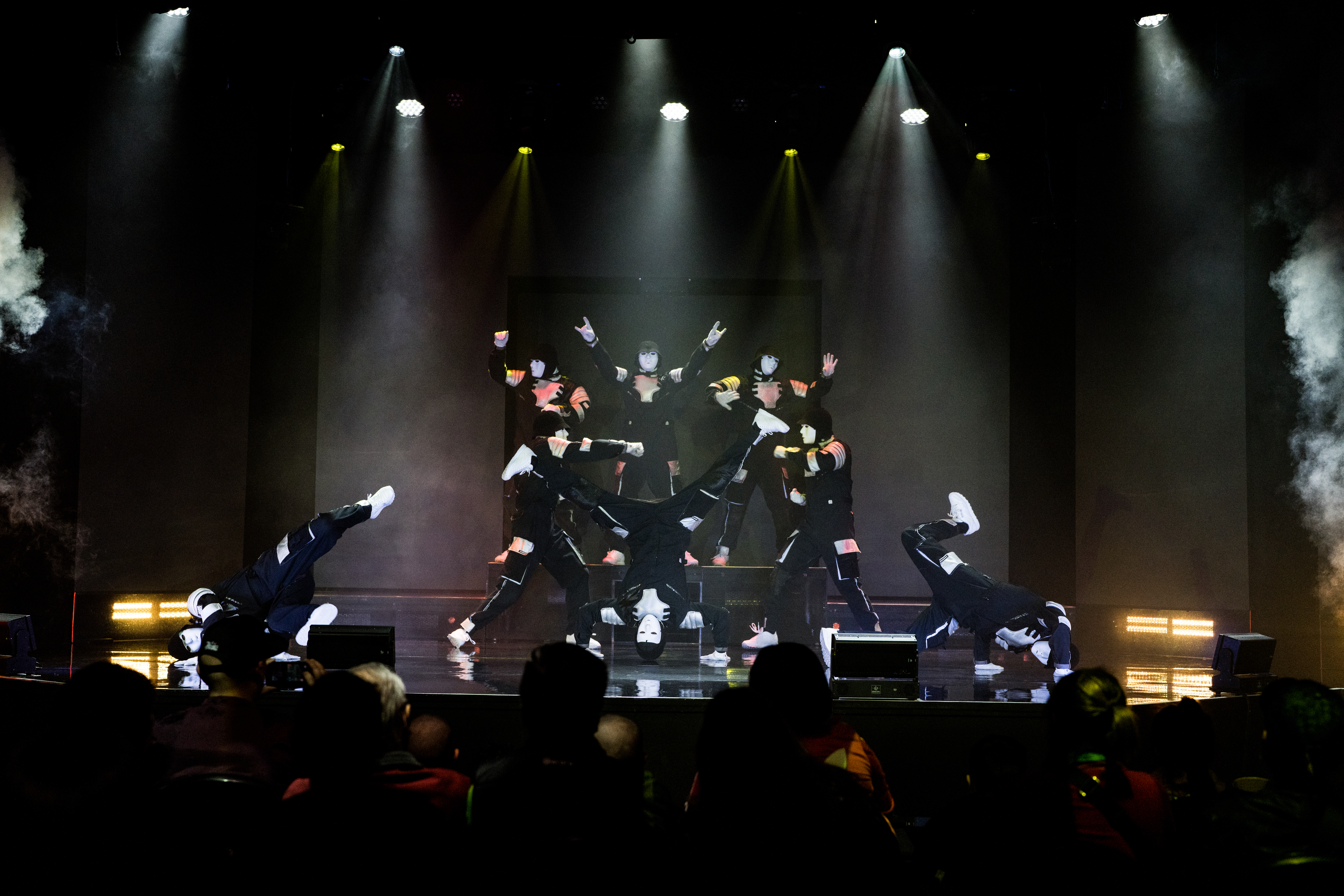
Jabbawockeez Live On Stage

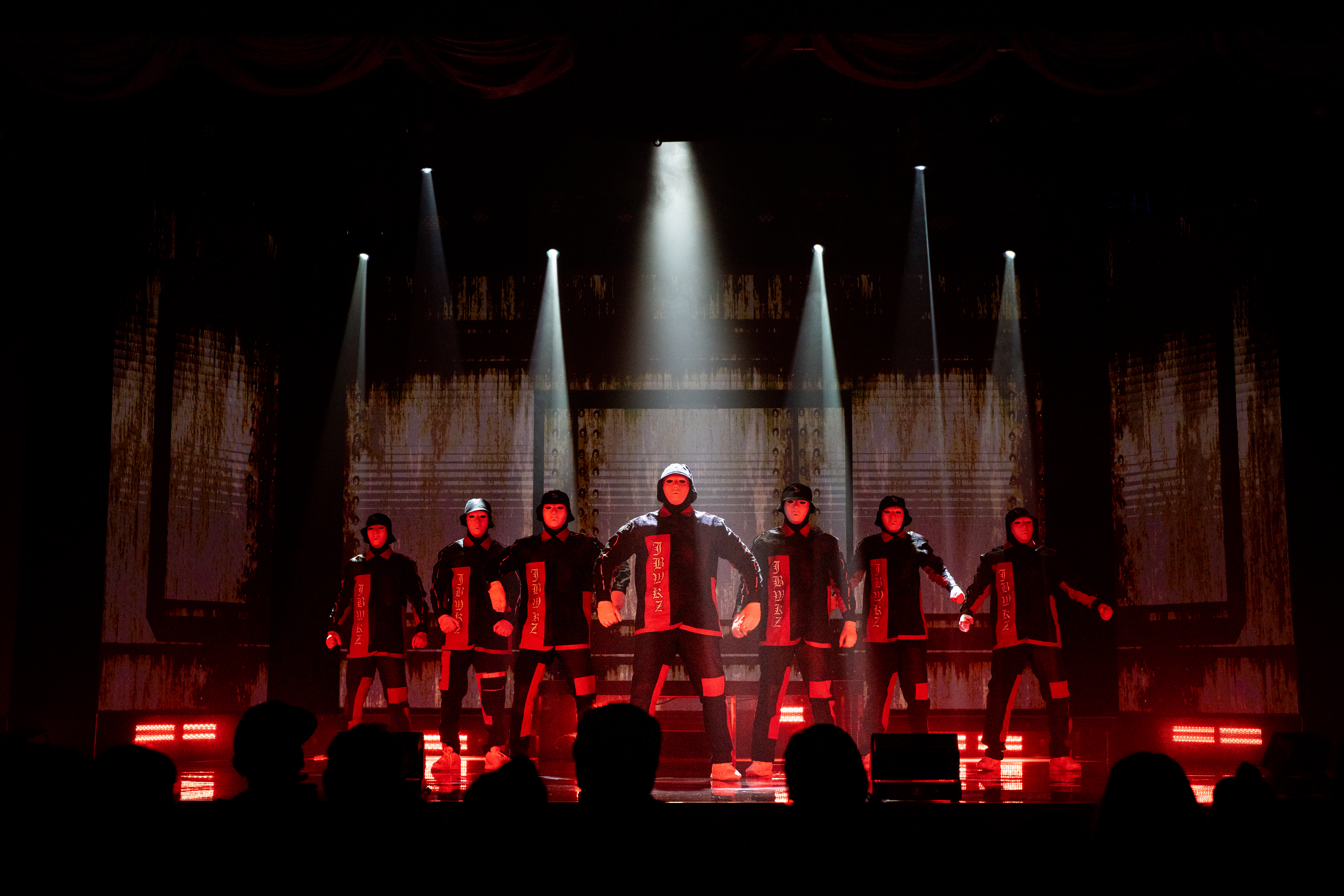
Jabbawockeez Live at MGM Grand

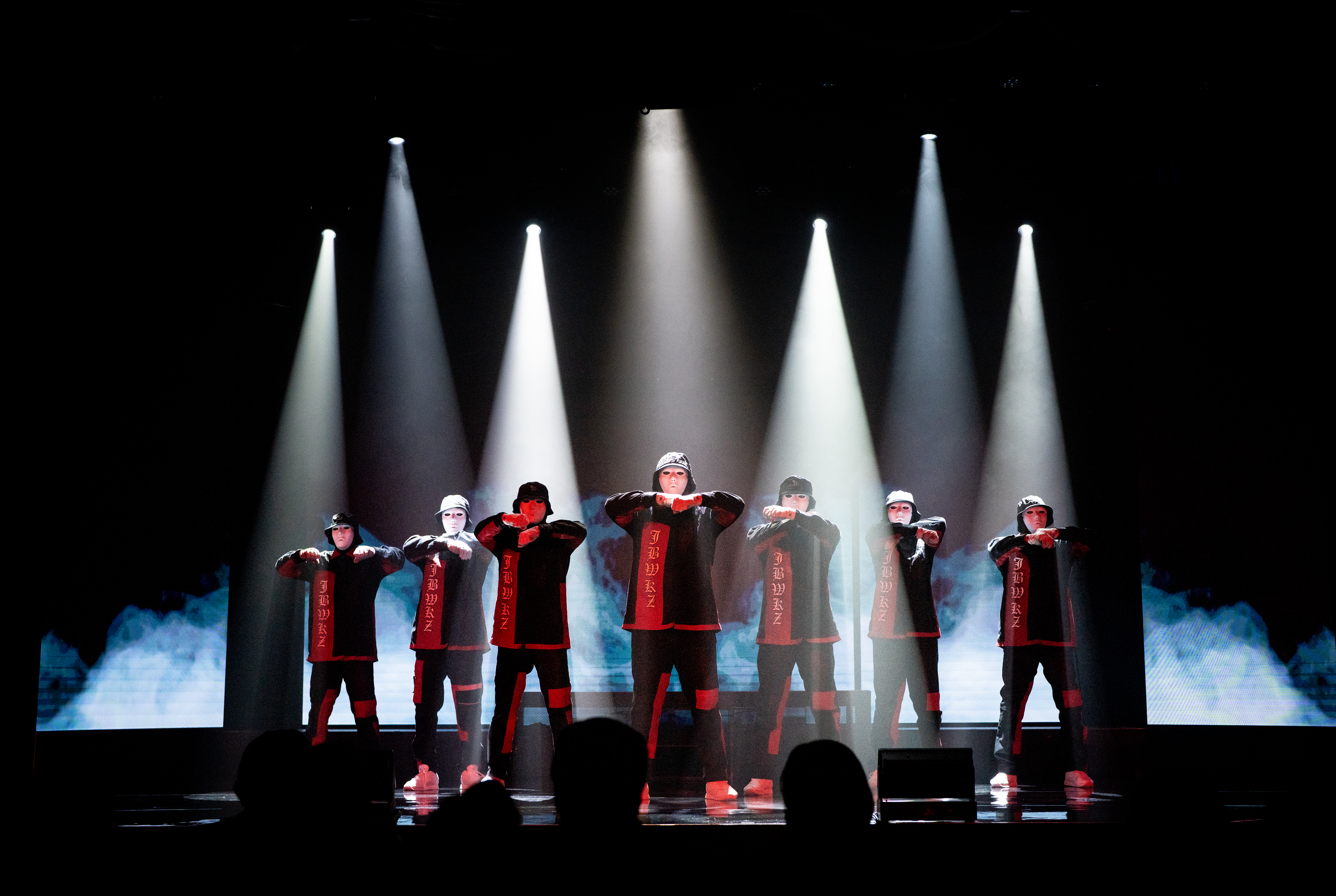
Jabbawockeez Present Timeless at MGM Grand Hotel, Las Vegas

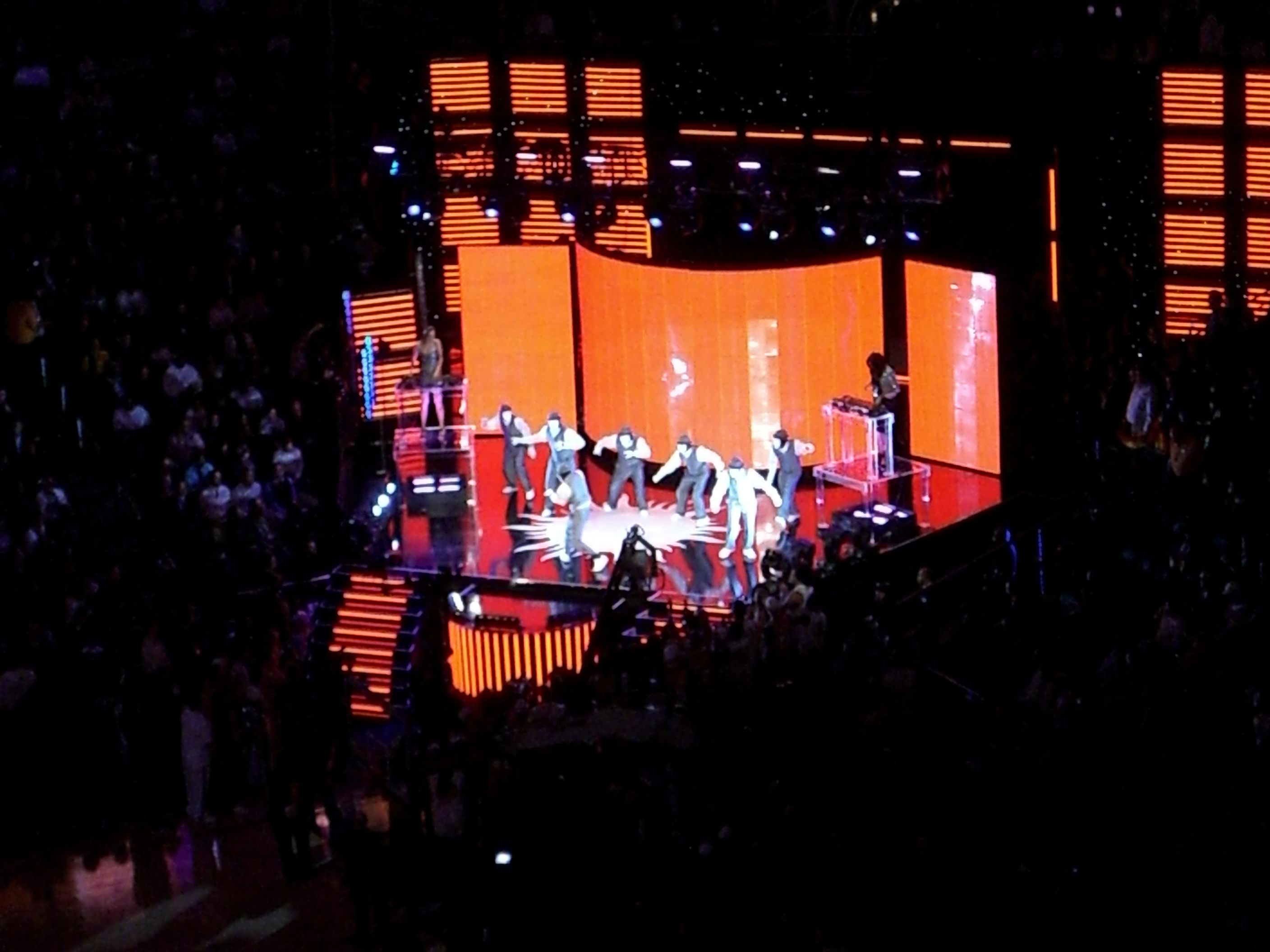
Jabbawockeez performance

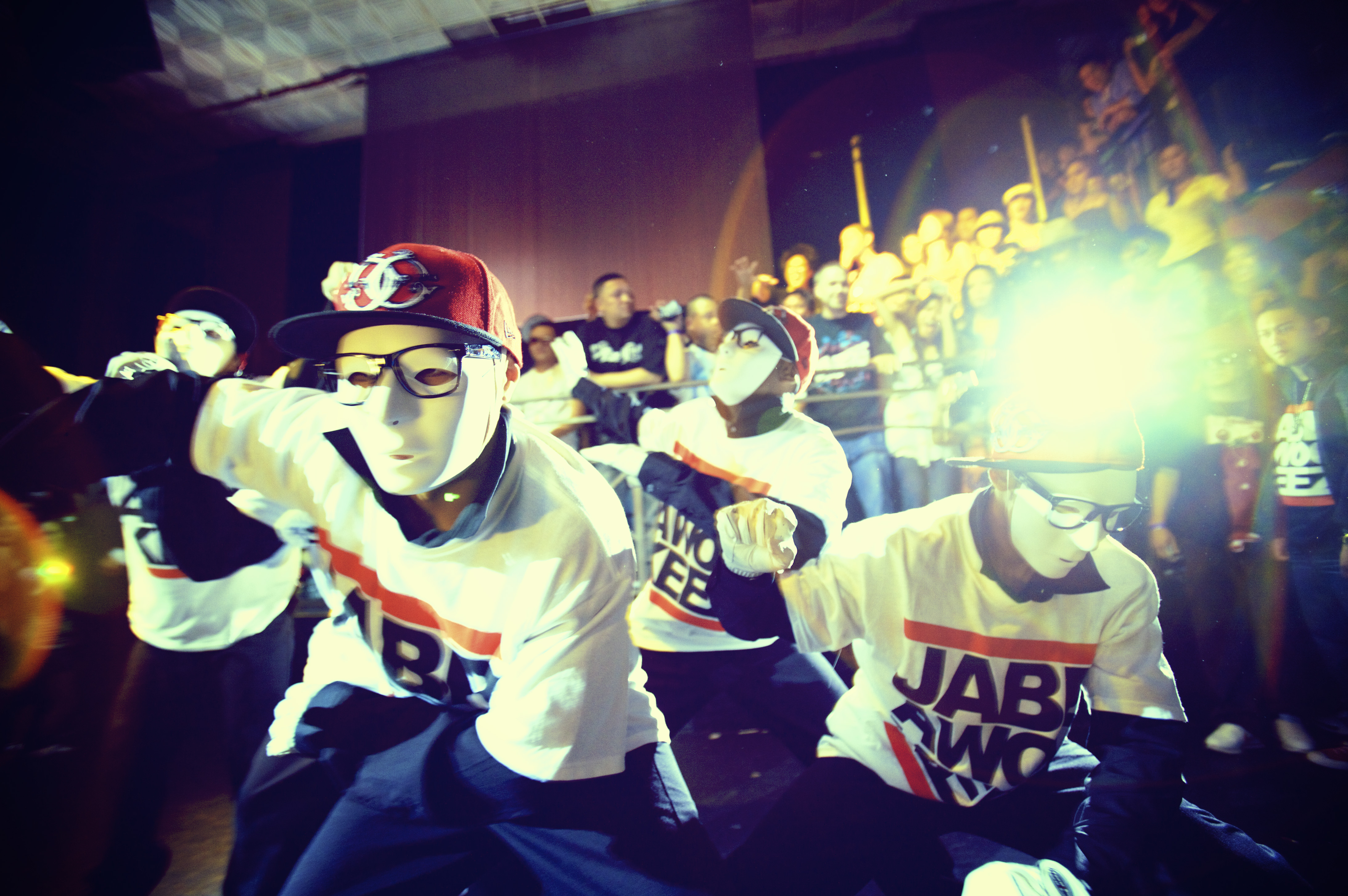
Jabbawockeez in San Jose

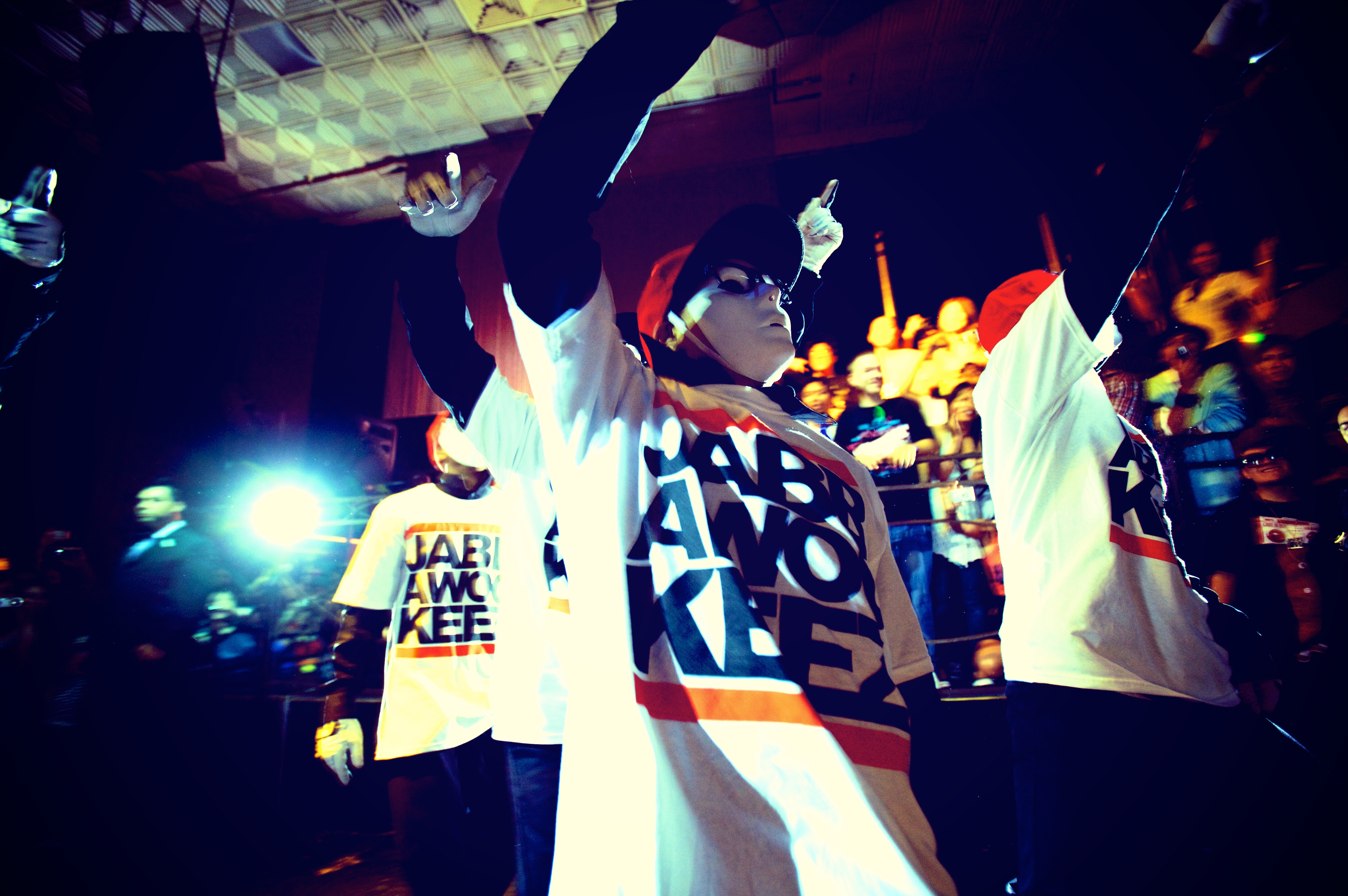
Jabbawockeez

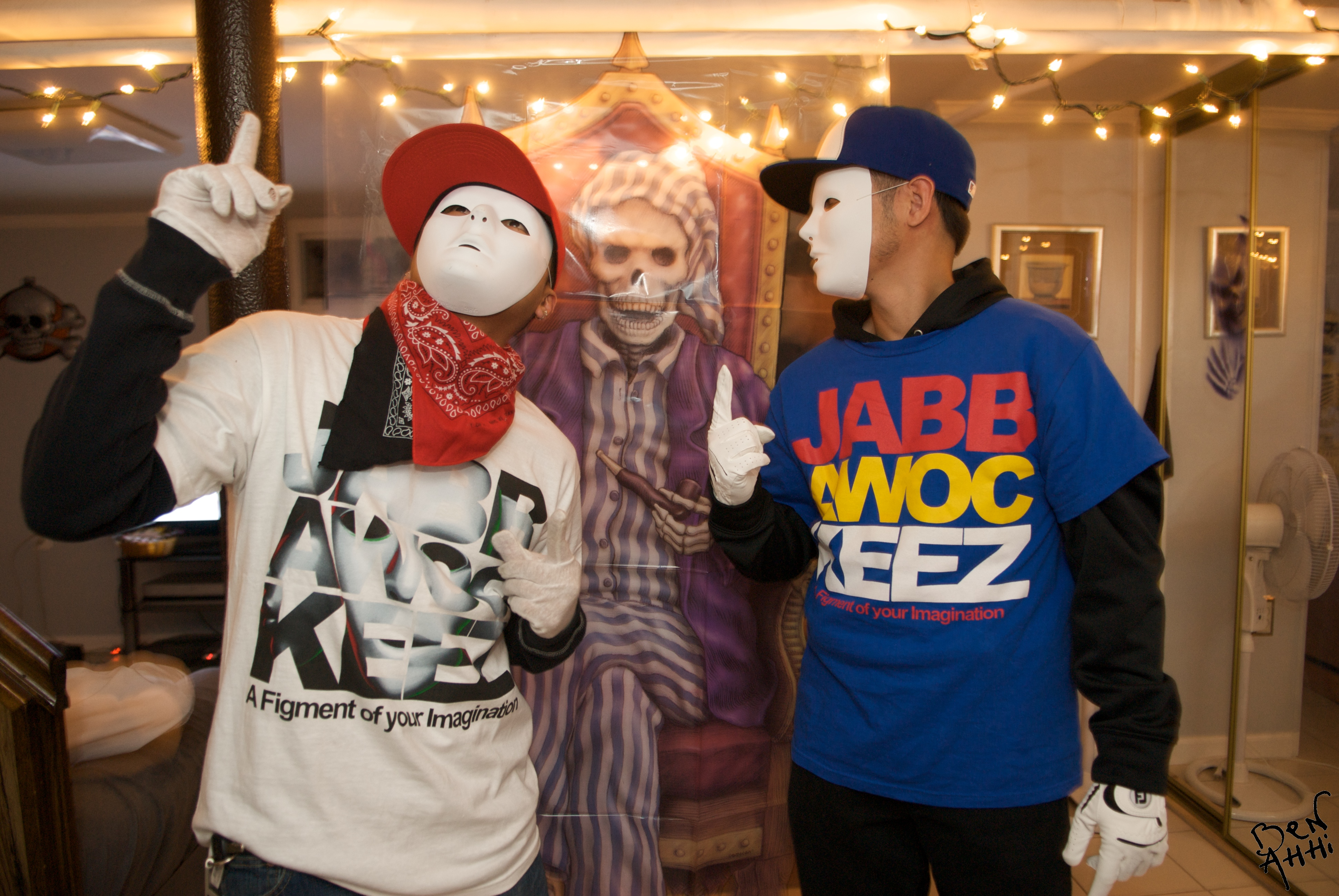
Members of Jabbawockeez

Preceded by Inaugural	America's Best Dance Crew Champions; Jabbawockeez	Succeeded by Super Cr3w
