= Orono Bog =

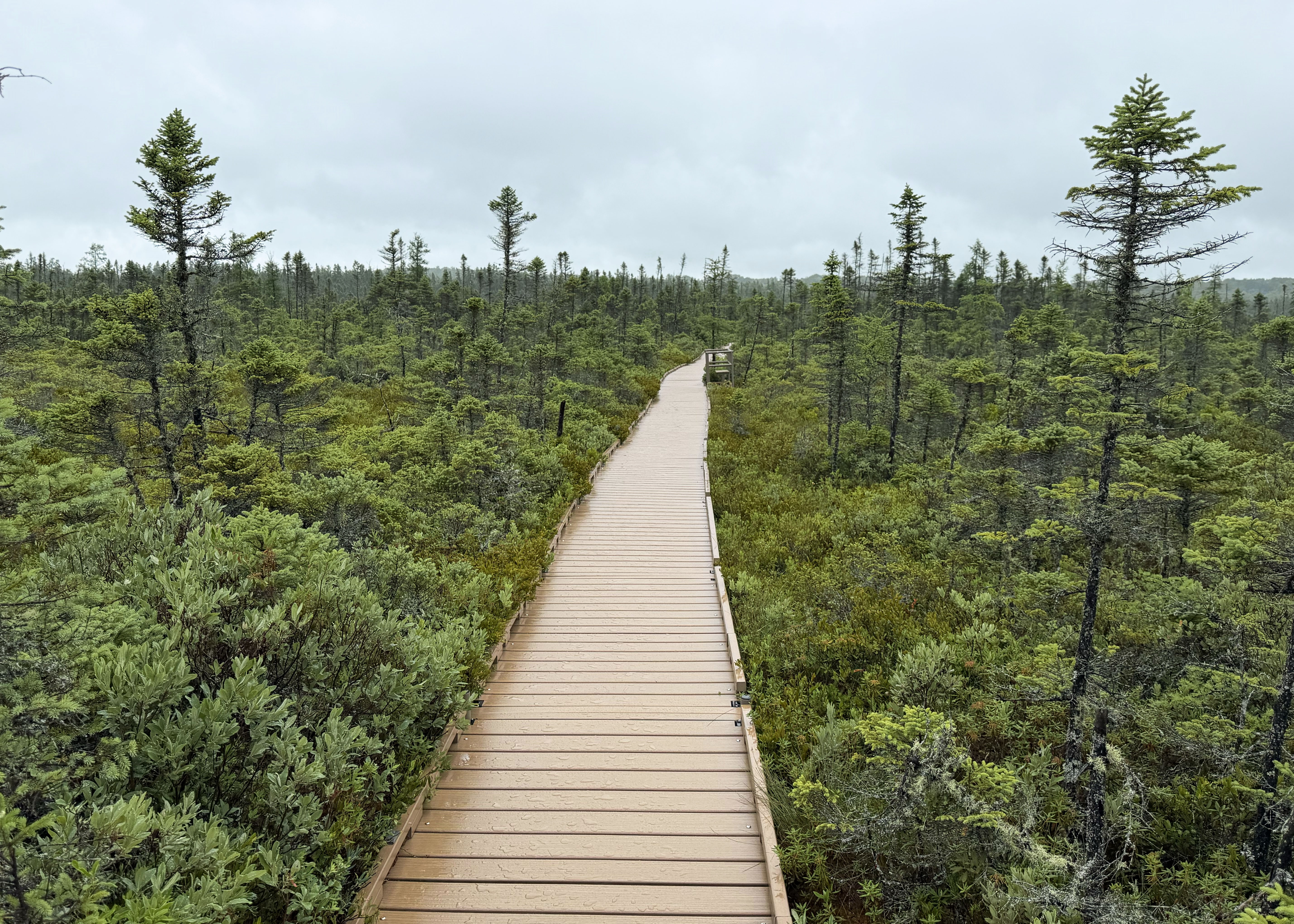
- Orono Bog Boardwalk

- Location within Maine
- Location: Penobscot County, Maine, United States
- Nearest city: Bangor, ME
- Coordinates: 44.86907°N 68.725668°W
- Area: 600 acres (240 ha)
- Designated: 1973
- Administrator: University of Maine/City of Bangor
- Website: Official website

The Orono Bog is a bog that covers 600 acres (240 ha) and is part of the Caribou Bog complex in Penobscot County, Maine. The bog is known for the Orono Bog Boardwalk, which is a 4,200 feet (1,300 m) long boardwalk open to public use. The bog is in both the city of Bangor and the town of Orono. The bog is also partially protected as part of both the Bangor City Forest and land owned by the University of Maine. Orono Bog became a National Natural Landmark in 1973.
