= Bangor Township =

Bangor Township may refer to:

- Bangor Township, Marshall County, Iowa
- Bangor Township, Bay County, Michigan
- Bangor Township, Van Buren County, Michigan
- Bangor Township, Pope County, Minnesota
- Bangor Township, Brookings County, South Dakota; see Brookings County, South Dakota

== See also ==
- Bangor (disambiguation)
