= City of Bangor =

City of Bangor may refer to:

- City of Bangor (ship), a Great Lakes shipwreck
- City of Bangor, a US airline with the ICAO code XBG; see Airline codes-C
- Bangor, Maine, United States, a city
- Bangor, Michigan, United States, a city
