= The Bangerz =

American hip hop group

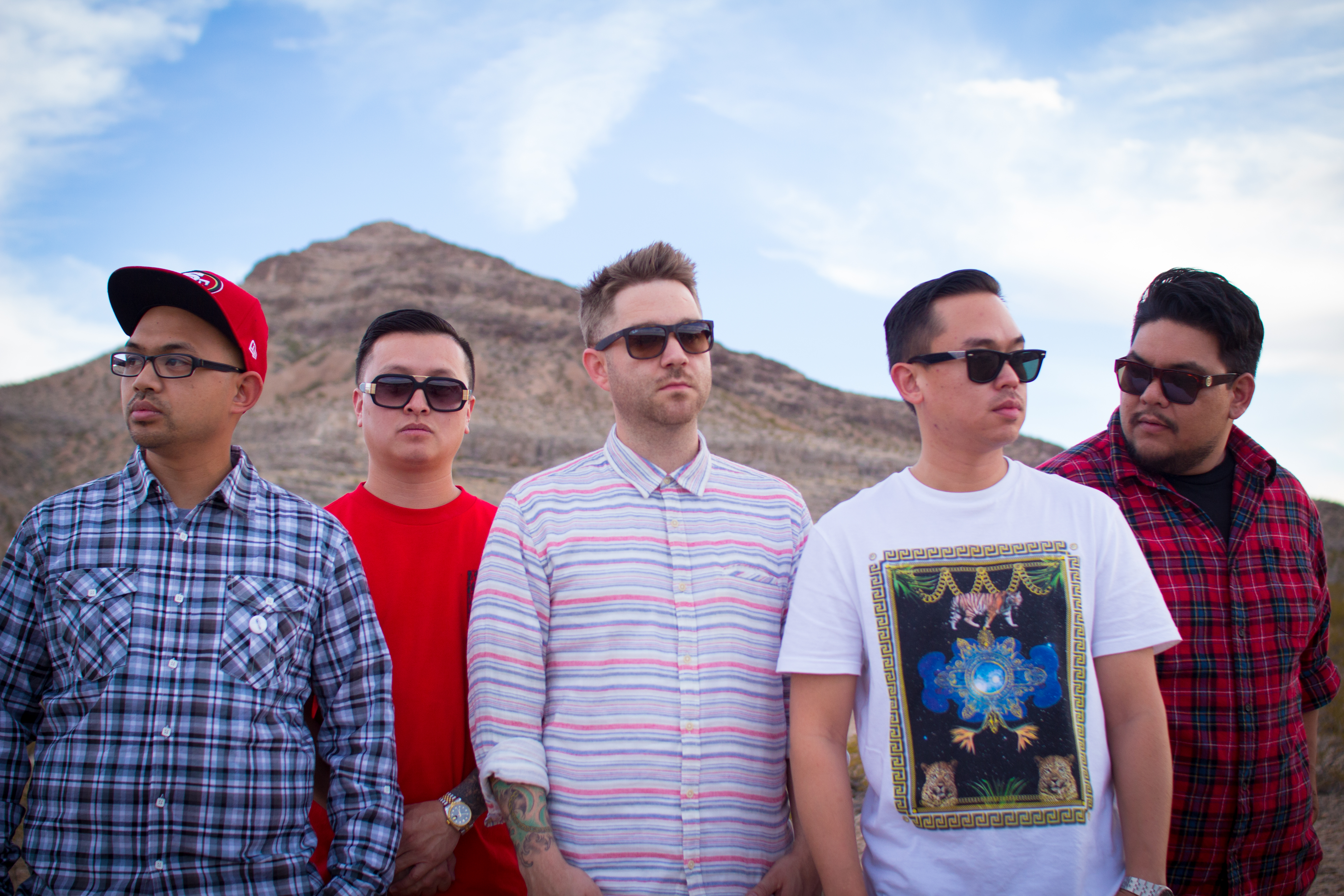

Background information
- Origin: San Jose, California
- Genres: Hip hop, R&B, electronica
- Years active: 1998–present
- Label: JBWKZ Records
- Members: Nick Ngo Bangerz; Goldenchyld; Cutso; Squareweezy; Replay; G-Wrex
- Website: TheBangerz.com

The Bangerz are a six-member production and DJ group originating in San Jose, California, and now based in Las Vegas, Los Angeles, and the Bay Area. They have released three studio albums, two of which are the official scores for live stage shows by the group Jabbawockeez, who were named MTV’s America’s Best Dance Crew Champions in 2008.

The Bangerz have collaborated with groups as diverse as San Jose Taiko, a Japanese drumming ensemble, and have toured with groups such as Afrika Bambaataa, Clipse, ?uestlove (of The Roots), Raekwon, Ghostface, Carlos Mencia and DJ Z-Trip.

== History ==
=== Founding ===
The Bangerz were founded as a six-person production and DJ supergroup in San Jose, California. All the members, including Goldenchyld, Replay, Nick Ngo, Cutso, Squareweezy, and G-Wrex, had attended Silver Creek High School together.

All six members had previously been parts of different DJ collectives. DJ Cutso, for example, had started mixing after learning from his uncle at eight years old, and based a lot of his early music on Depeche Mode, Kraftwerk, OMD, and Pet Shop Boys. According to Cutso, "Growing up in San Jose, there was a strong presence of mobile DJs, dance groups and mix-shows on the radio. So growing up in that environment really struck a nerve with me, and I decided to get a little more serious about it when my friends started taking an interest in it."

On October 24, 1998, Cutso invited a number of DJ friends to his 17th birthday party. According to Cutso, "We had a bit of an impromptu showcase that night. We jammed in front of the whole party and everyone was super juiced on it. That following Monday at school, we assembled what would eventually become the Fingerbangerz Crew."

=== Battling ===
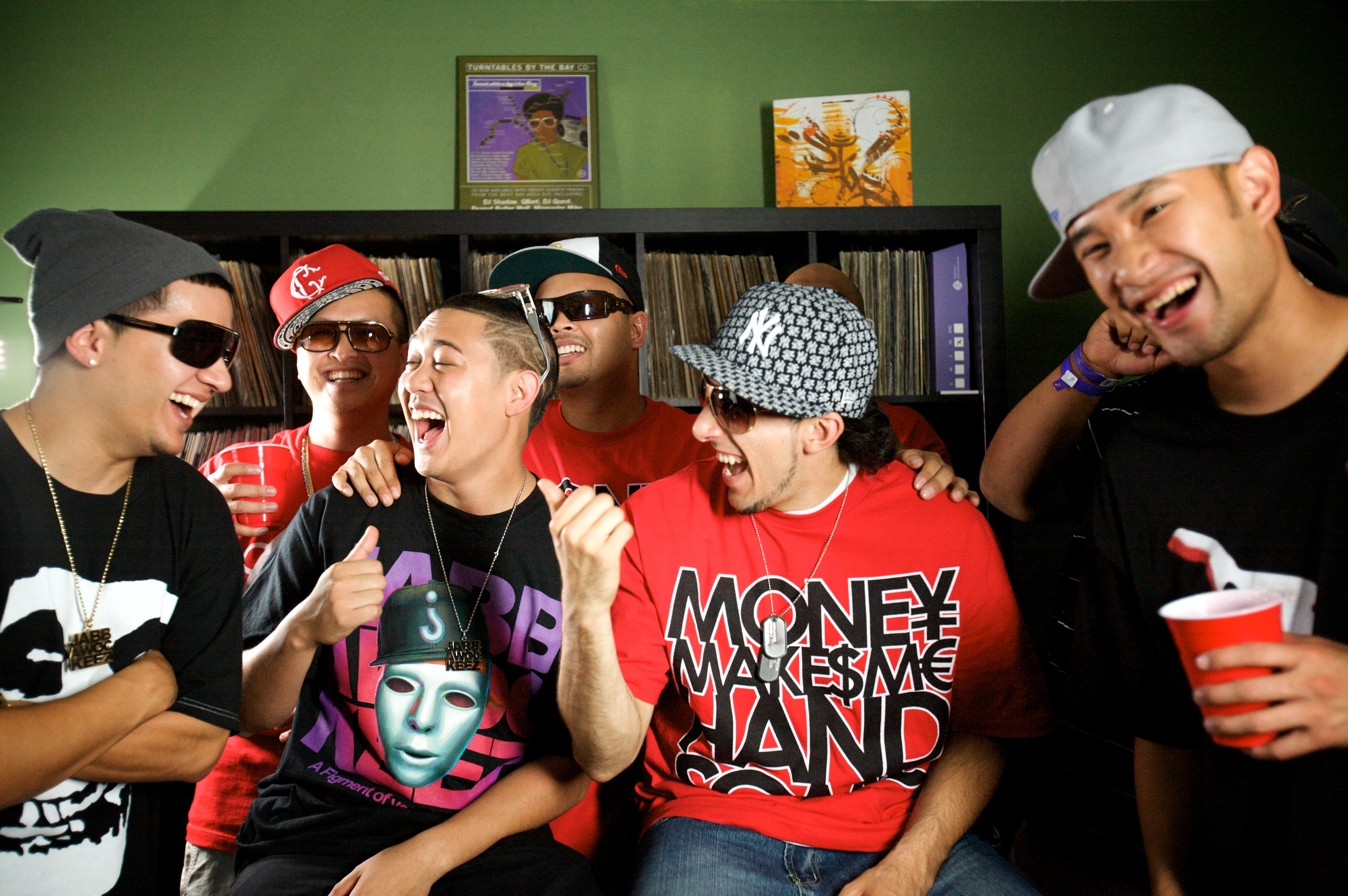
Backstage picture of the Bangerz with members of Jabbawockeez. Both groups collaborated in the San Jose party scene as early as 2003.

The Fingerbangerz originally formed "for the sake of battling," and later began to DJ parties. As the only 6-person DJ and production team to make and perform music, they were the first DJ group to utilize a 12-turntable team routine in 1999.

They've stated, "we entered every local record store, high school and car show battle under that name. Our plan was to just dominate the battle scene, and that’s exactly what we did." The Bangerz were named the 2001 DMC Regional Champions and 2000 International Turntablist Federation Western Hemisphere Team Champions, also winning the Red Bull 3-Style Bay Area DJ Competition.

The group came out with a mixtape called Robot Remains, which debuted at #7 on the electronic charts on iTunes. After releasing several mixtapes and winning various DJ battles, they started "producing our own brand of scratch-infused experimental music." After 2003, the "finger" aspect of the name was dropped to make the group more accessible to a younger crowd.

=== VI-R-US (2003) ===
The group released their first album, VI-R-US, in 2003. Released independently, it widened their fanbase as far as Japan and brought them more fully to the attention of Jabbawockeez, a hip-hop dance crew who had started dancing to Bangerz tracks in 2003. According to Cutso, "We grew up with one of the Jabbawockeez’ former members, Wish One. They were forming the Jabbawockeez around the same time we released our first album, VI.R.US, in 2003. He showed it to them, and they used it for some of their routines. They built their signature style around all of the chaos and intricacies of our music."

Their official connection with the dance group started around 2007, when they were about to be named MTV’s America's Best Dance Crew (season 1) Champions,. The Jabbawockeez commissioned the Bangerz to create all their original music, and after winning ABDC, they began collaborating on a Vegas dance show.

=== MÜS.I.C. (2008) ===
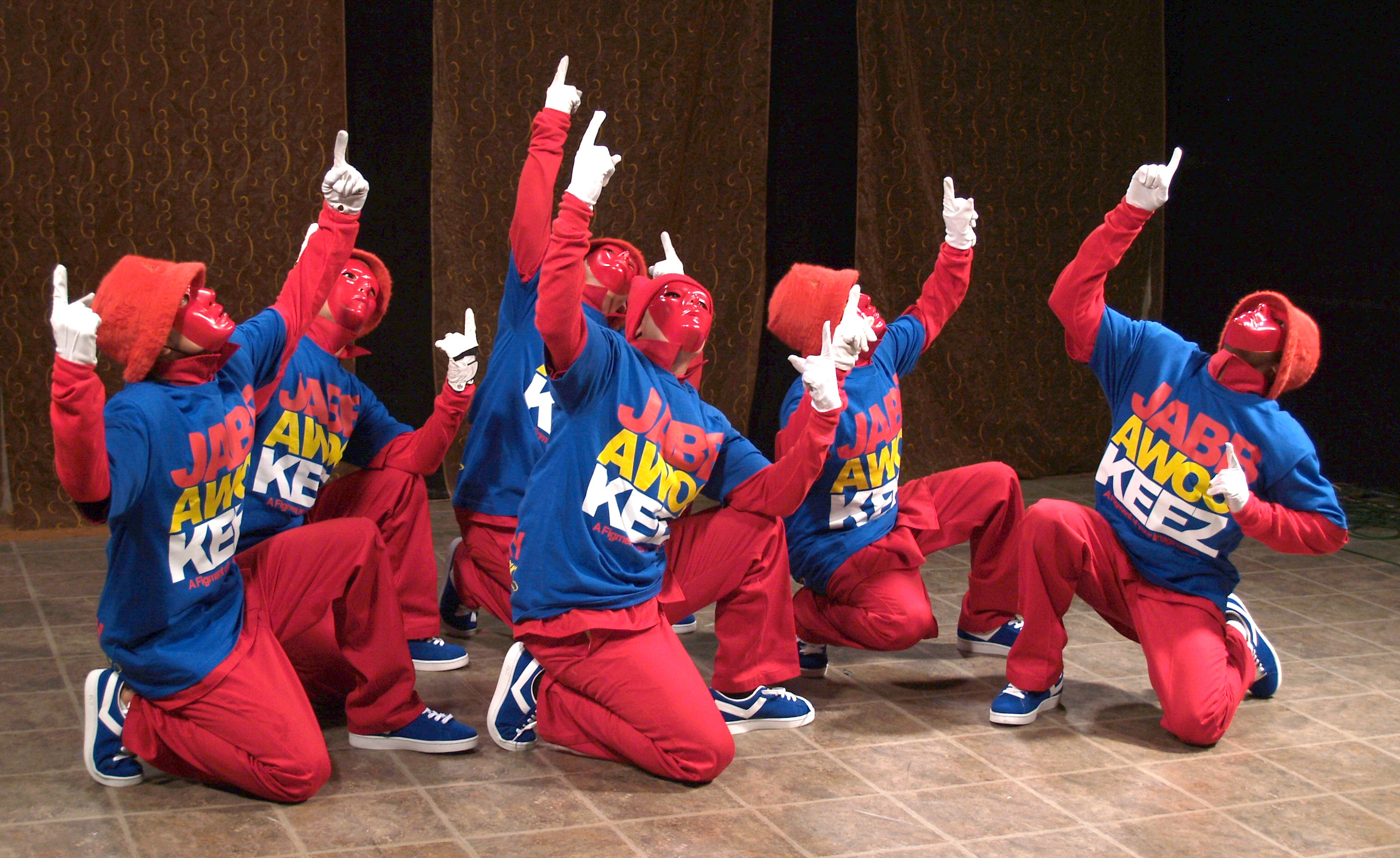
The Jabbawockeez performing to Bangerz music in 2008

On March 1st, 2011 the Bangerz released the LP Müs.I.C. It charted directly behind Daft Punk’s Tron on iTunes upon its release. The first single from the 14 tracks, "Robot Remains," had climbed to the number seven electronic song on iTunes after its release in October 2010.

The tracks had been used as a live soundtrack for over a year by the JabbaWockeez at the Monte Carlo Resort & Casino in Las Vegas, and the overall album was three years in the making.

=== PRiSM (2013) ===
After MÜS.I.C., the Bangerz began collaborating on the new stage show PRiSM with the Jabbawockeez in Las Vegas. It became the third largest show in the city, only behind the Blue Man Group and Cirque du Soleil. The score to the show, also titled PRiSM, was released as an LP on June 25, 2013. The single from the album, "Beam," premiered several weeks earlier.

=== Collaborations ===
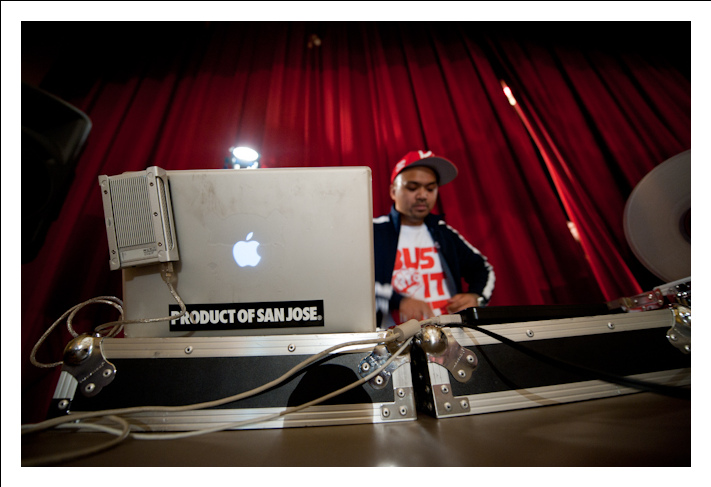
DJ Squareweezy of The Bangerz DJing live in 2010

As of 2011, everyone in the crew are full-time musicians and DJs. Group member Replay, for example, has produced tracks for Diplo, Kelis and Chris Brown on his single "Look At Me Now." Their music has appeared in advertisements for McDonald's, Sprint, The Sims, The Simpsons Game, the 2009 NBA All Star Game, America's Best Dance Crew (season 1), and Pepsi. As of June 2013, their music was being featured in two Microsoft commercials. The Bangerz have toured with and opened for artists such as Afrika Bambaataa, The Clipse, ?uestlove (of The Roots), Raekwon, Ghostface, Kid Koala, The Rapture, and Little Dragon, also touring with Carlos Mencia and DJ Z-Trip both nationally and internationally. The New Orleans’ Voodoo Fest was their first festival, and they also performed at the first Fader Fest.

They've also worked with artists out of San Jose like rappers Rey Resurreccion and Don Prahfit, as well as American born, Japan based rapper Paulie Rhyme. In early 2013 the group was solicited by the director of the film Project X to produce a track for their party soundtrack. The Bangerz held a collaborative show at the Montgomery Theater on June 15, 2013 with the Japanese-American drumming group San Jose Taiko, after first performing with them at the 2010 SubZERO festival. Kumi daiko, a new style that evolved to include American and Japanese drumming techniques and genres, originated in San Francisco in 1968. Started in 1973, San Jose Taiko is the third-oldest American taiko group.

== Style ==
"When producing, the big-picture challenge is to tell a story and keep people excited. When DJing, we play hip-hop classics, pop favorites, RnB electro, trap, and all sorts of stuff but we keep it fresh and surprising.”

— The Bangerz

About their method, "It's a lot of experimenting," says Bello, "We record everything, and then if something cool comes from it, we'll expand on it and make it a song." According to the group, "Nick Ngo loves aggressive sounds, bringing harder, meaner sounds and throwing in production tricks and off-kilter sounds. Cutso’s crates go deeper and weirder; he’s a master of beat-juggling and unexpected flips. Goldenchyld‘s vision harmonizes the group’s sound with futuristic ideas. Squareweezy is an experimentalist and a showman, heavy into where hip-hop and electronica meet and takes notes from genre figureheads like J Dilla and FlyLo. G-Wrex makes sure the music has depth, his love of RnB and soul automatically serves him in grounding the group. And Replay [brings] a glossy pop sheen to every track.

Starting around 2009, the group have done most of their performing on Serato and Ableton, with much of their production work on Ableton. Squareweezy uses an Akai MPC (an MPC2000XL) and the Roland SP-404 in live shows. They also use Native Instruments products.

== Members ==
Current

- Nick Ngo Bangerz (Ngobility)
- Cutso (Paolo Bello)
- Replay (Ryan Buendia)
- G-Wrex (Germel Boado)
- DJ Goldenchyld (Dominic Cueto)
- Squareweezy aka Weezmatic (Aaron Aquino)

== Discography ==
Studio albums

- 2003: VI-R-US
- 2011: MÜS.I.C.
- 2013: PRiSM
- 2020: Timeless

Singles

- 2010: "Robot Remains"
- 2013: "Beam"
- 2013: "Legends Never Die"
- 2020: “Mask Off”
- 2020: “Prophecy”
