= Bangor City Forest =

Coordinates: 44°52′N 68°45′W

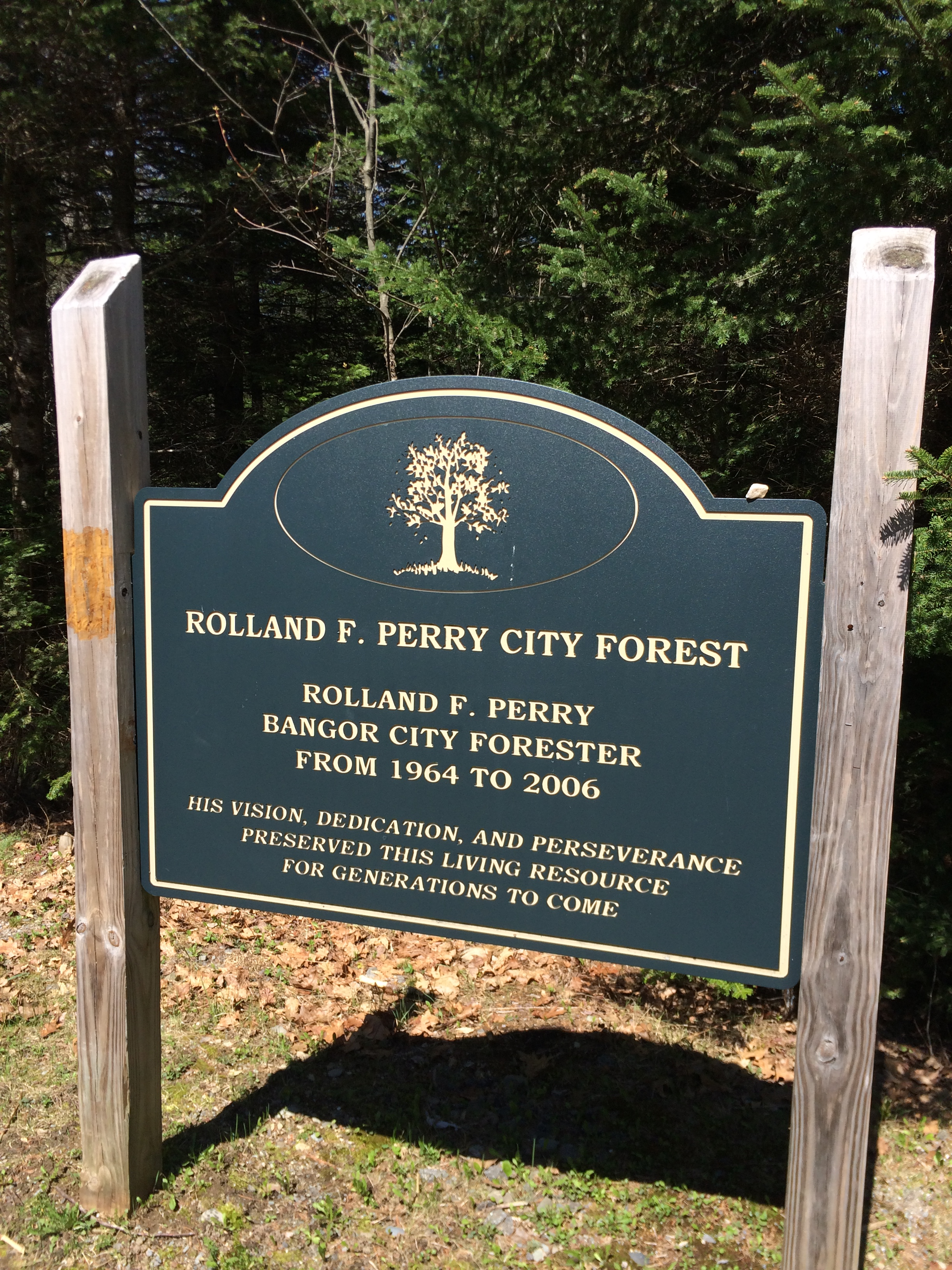
Sign at the entrance to the Bangor, Maine, USA City Forest

The Bangor City Forest, also known as the Rolland F. Perry City Forest, is a large recreation area in Bangor, Maine. The park consists of approximately 650 acres (2.6 km^{2}) and features close to 10 miles (16 km) of hiking, cycling, and cross-country skiing trails. The trail system is well maintained and most trails are packed gravel. Although primarily a recreational area, it is technically a "working forest."

The park has a large parking and picnic area located at the end of Tripp Drive. Additional parking is available at the end of Kittredge Road.

The entrance to the Orono Bog Boardwalk, a one-mile (1.6 km) boardwalk over the Orono Bog, is located on East Trail approximately 0.25 miles (0.4 km) from the parking area. The boardwalk is handicapped accessible.
