= Rob Dyrdek =

American skateboarder and reality TV personality (born 1974)

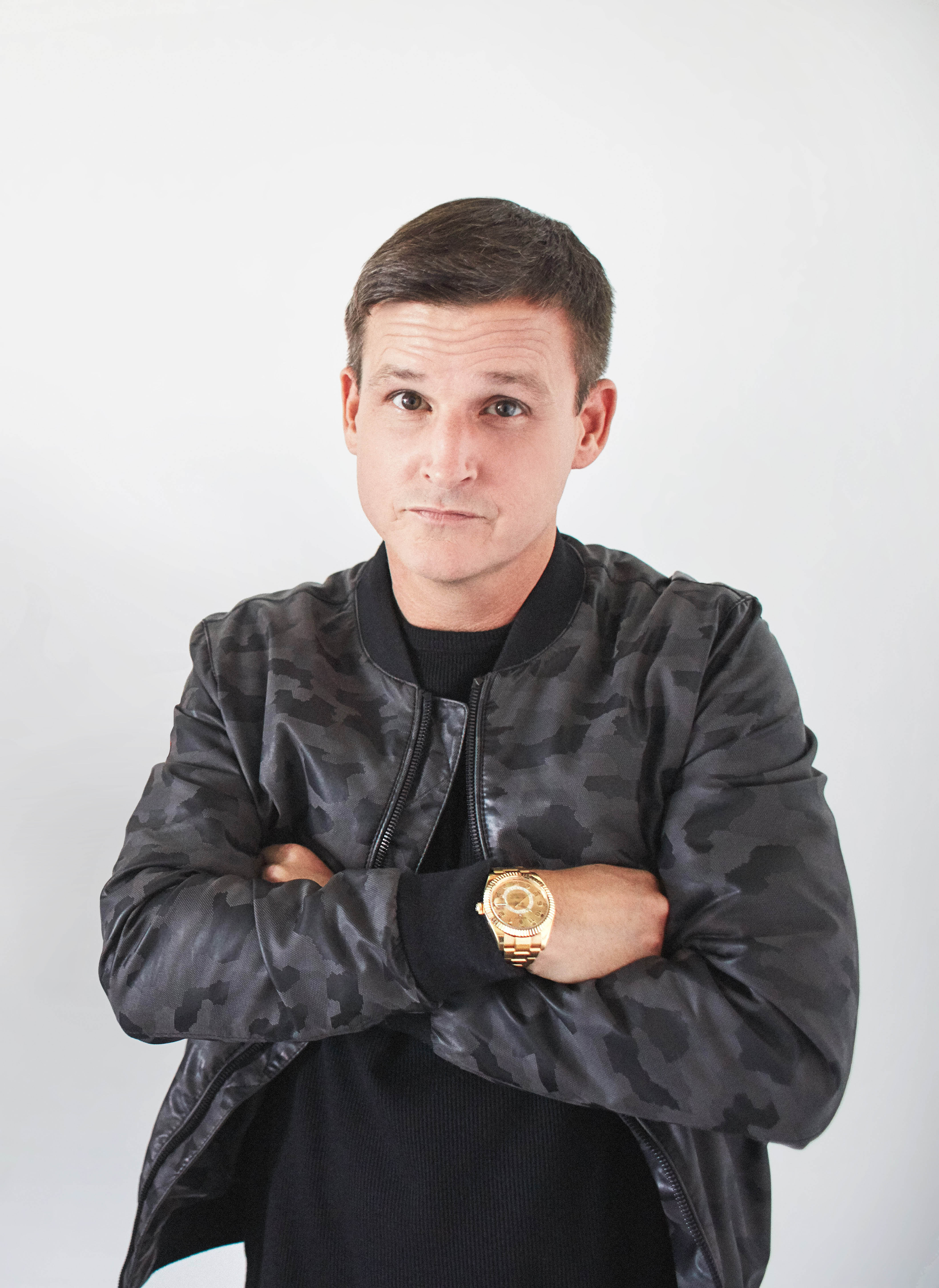
- Dyrdek in 2017
- Born: Robert Stanley Dyrdek; June 28, 1974 (age 52); Kettering, Ohio, U.S.
- Occupations: Skateboarder; actor/television personality; producer; entrepreneur
- Years active: 1991–present
- Television: Rob & Big; Rob Dyrdek's Fantasy Factory; Ridiculousness; Wild Grinders
- Spouse: Bryiana Noelle Flores (m. 2016)
- Children: 2
- Sports career
- Sport: Skateboarding
- Turned pro: 1991 (age 16)
- Website: dyrdek.com

Robert Stanley Dyrdek (/rɒp ˈdɪərˌdɛk/) (born June 28, 1974) is an American actor, producer, reality TV personality, and former professional skateboarder. He is best known for his roles in the MTV reality and variety shows Rob & Big, Rob Dyrdek's Fantasy Factory, and Ridiculousness. In addition to his television ventures, Dyrdek is an entrepreneur, founding several businesses through his venture studio, Dyrdek Machine, including Street League Skateboarding and Superjacket Productions (now Thrill One Media).

== Early life ==
Dyrdek was born on June 28, 1974, in Kettering, Ohio, to Gene and Patty Dyrdek. He was involved in sports as a child and began skateboarding at the age of 11. Of his early interest in the sport, Dyrdek has stated, "I was so focused on becoming a pro skateboarder. I would sit in school and think about all the tricks I was going to do, then I'd get out of school and skate until they made me come inside." Dyrdek attended Fairmont High School in Kettering.

== Career ==
=== 1986–2005: Professional skateboarding and early business ventures ===
At the age of 11, Dyrdek earned a sponsorship to represent Surf Ohio, a local skate shop in Dayton, Ohio. He began competing at age 12. Gordon and Smith Skateboard Company (G&S), a national brand, began sponsoring him around that time. In July 1989 at age 15, Dyrdek placed first at a National Skateboard Association North Central District competition. At the age of 16, he decided to forgo his senior year of high school and instead moved to Southern California to continue his professional skate career. He officially turned pro in 1991, competing at the Skateboard World Cup in Germany and placing fifth. He also appeared in the Alien Workshop skate video, Memory Screen, that year. Alien Workshop, a Dayton, Ohio-based skateboarding company, began sponsoring Dyrdek at that time. The company began producing signature Dyrdek skateboards soon after the endorsement. Dyrdek also founded his own skateboard accessory company, Orion Trucks, at age 17.

By 1995, Dyrdek was competing at events and performing at exhibitions throughout North America, Europe, Asia, and Australia. Around that time, Droors Clothing, which later became known as DC Shoes, began sponsoring Dyrdek. During 1995, he launched his first signature shoe (the RD 1) with DC, beginning a 20-year partnership that included 29 signature shoes. In 1999, Dyrdek expanded into the business world by founding Dyrdek Enterprises.

In 2000, Dyrdek placed sixth in park skating at that year's X Games in San Francisco. In 2003, he founded Silver Trucks, a skateboarding accessories company. In 2005, he drafted, designed, developed, and raised funding for the world's first skate plaza, the Rob Dyrdek/DC Shoes Skate Plaza, in his hometown of Kettering. The park emphasized elements of street skateboarding, incorporating urban artifacts like stairs, ledges, planters, and railings. It was the first project funded by the Rob Dyrdek/DC Shoes Skate Plaza Foundation.

=== 2006–2009: MTV reality series ===
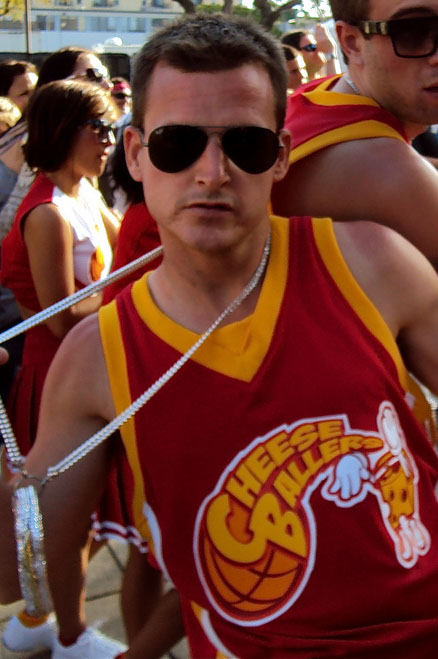
Dyrdek in 2010

In November 2006, the MTV reality series Rob & Big premiered, which starred Dyrdek and his best friend and bodyguard, Christopher "Big Black" Boykin, as well as his cousin, Chris "Drama" Pfaff, and friend, Rashawn "Bam Bam" Davis. It was born from a skit Dyrdek wrote for a 2003 DC Shoes video, The DC Video. In the skit, he hired Boykin as a bodyguard for protection from security guards while filming street skating videos. The show featured instances of these interactions along with other facets of Dyrdek's daily life. As part of Rob & Big in 2007, Dyrdek set 21 skating world records in one day, according to the Guinness Book of World Records. Some of these included the longest board slide (100 ft 5.75 in, or 30.62 m), the highest skateboard ramp jump into water (10 ft 8 in, or 3.29 m), and the most nollie kickflips in one minute (22). The series ended its run in April 2008 after three seasons.

In February 2009, Rob Dyrdek's Fantasy Factory, featuring Dyrdek, Pfaff, and his Dyrdek Enterprise staff, was first broadcast. It covered Dyrdek's "Fantasy Factory", a converted warehouse where Dyrdek runs his businesses. He also built a recording studio for Pfaff inside the factory. During the course of the first season, he opened his first SafeSpot SkateSpot. At the grand-opening, Mayor Antonio Villaraigosa rode with Dyrdek on the world's largest skateboard. Fantasy Factory aired a total of seven seasons, with the season finale airing on March 13, 2014. On that final episode, Dyrdek set the Guinness World Record for the longest reverse ramp jump by a car at 89 feet, 3.25 inches. The show mainly featured a cast of Dyrdek, Chris Pfaff, Boykin, Scott Pfaff, Chanel West Coast, and Sterling "Steelo" Brim. Episodes featured Dyrdek being bitten by a shark and attacked by a trained tiger. Other stunts included the first kickflip with a Chevrolet Sonic, filmed as a part of a television advertisement for Chevrolet. He co-invented the first "skateboard car," a customized Ford Mustang which appeared on the show.

In a 2009 episode of Fantasy Factory, Dyrdek purchased a racehorse with Joe Ciagla, Jr. and jockeyed it in its first race. The horse, named Mega Heat, won the race with Dyrdek as the jockey. Dyrdek would go on to own as many as 13 horses at one time, some of which raced in Breeders' Cup events.

=== 2010–2016: Creation of Street League Skateboarding, Ridiculousness, and other TV series ===
In 2010, Dyrdek launched Street League Skateboarding (SLS), a professional skateboarding competition series. The league offered the highest overall purse in the history of the sport ($1.6 million) for its championship event in 2012, which was broadcast on ESPN in 198 countries. The league also partnered with the Boys & Girls Clubs of America to develop new skate parks in California. The organization was the focus of Dyrdek's 2013 documentary film The Motivation, which premiered at the Tribeca Film Festival. SLS has expanded into a global series with events throughout the world.

On August 29, 2011, Dyrdek's third MTV series, Ridiculousness, premiered. The show, which is filmed in front of a studio audience, is hosted by Dyrdek alongside friends Chanel West Coast and Steelo Brim. In addition to occasional guests, the three primarily comment on popular internet videos that are often mishaps. By 2020, MTV had devoted most of its programming schedule to Ridiculousness. In April 2012, Dyrdek's Wild Grinders animated television series premiered on Nicktoons. Dyrdek created and produced the show and also provided the voice of Lil' Rob. The characters are based on a line of toys designed by Dyrdek.

Also in 2012, Dyrdek Enterprises acquired DNA Distribution, the holding company for his original skateboarding sponsor brand, Alien Workshop, and other brands including Habitat and Reflex. DNA Distribution was later acquired by Pacific Vector Holdings in October 2013. In 2014, Dyrdek and his production company Superjacket Productions agreed to a multi-year deal with MTV to continue producing Ridiculousness and a final season of Rob Dyrdek's Fantasy Factory. That year, the Dyrdek-produced cooking competition series, Snack-Off, also premiered on MTV.

As part of Superjacket Productions, Dyrdek would go on to create and produce a number of new series. In 2016, two Dyrdek-produced shows, Jagger Eaton's Mega Life and Crashletes, premiered on Nickelodeon. He also produced The Dude Perfect Show, which premiered on CMT in 2016 and was moved to Nickelodeon for its second season in 2017.

=== 2016–present: Entrepreneurship with Dyrdek Machine and Thrill One ===
In 2016, he founded the Dyrdek Machine, a business investment firm and incubator (described by Dyrdek as a "venture studio") that targets startups. He had previously operated as a serial entrepreneur while also investing independently in various companies, including UFC and the clothing brand, Stance. Under Dyrdek Machine, he has co-founded, funded, and developed Lusso Cloud, Mindright (with Travis Barker and Joe Jonas), Outstanding Foods, Leisuretown (with Diplo), Momentous, Deon Libra, Jolie, and Black Feather Whiskey (with Travis Pastrana). By 2022, he had co-founded or partnered with a total of 18 brands through the Dyrdek Machine, five of which had been acquired by outside investors.

Dyrdek also continued creating television series through Superjacket Productions. In 2017, he produced a Ridiculousness spin-off for MTV, entitled Amazingness. The show was a variety talent competition hosted by Dyrdek. In 2020, The Raine Group and Causeway Media Partners provided the venture capital backing to form Thrill One Sports & Entertainment after a merger of Nitro Circus and two Dyrdek-created entities: Street League Skateboarding and Superjacket Productions. All three companies became subsidiaries of Thrill One at that time. Later that year, Dyrdek and Superjacket produced another Ridiculousness spin-off for MTV called Deliciousness, a food-based clip show hosted by Tiffani Thiessen. Superjacket Productions became known as Thrill One Media in 2021. Two more Ridiculousness spin-offs premiered that year in Messyness and Adorableness with Dyrdek as executive producer.

In 2021, Dyrdek started the business-focused podcast, Build with Rob. That year, he also founded the Do-Or-Dier Visionary Foundation, a non-profit organization aimed at providing entrepreneurship opportunities to underrepresented youth. In July 2022, Fiume Capital and Juggernaut Capital Partners acquired Thrill One Sports & Entertainment for $300 million. Through the Dyrdek Machine, Dyrdek provided additional investment capital in Thrill One at the time.

== Personal life ==
Dyrdek has one sister. Dyrdek became an ordained minister through the Universal Life Church in order to perform his sister's wedding in December 2011. The ceremony, which was featured in an episode of Rob Dyrdek's Fantasy Factory, took place at the Fantasy Factory in Los Angeles. He became engaged to his girlfriend, model Bryiana Noelle Flores, after proposing to her at Disneyland. They are married and have two children.

== Filmography ==
=== Film ===
List of selected film roles
Year	Title	Role	Notes
1991	Memory Screen	Self	Skate video
2003	The DC Video	Self	Skate video
2008	Righteous Kill	Rambo	
2009	Mind Field	Self	Skate video
2009	Street Dreams	Troy	Executive producer and writer
2011	Jackass 3.5	Self	Guest appearance
2012	We Are Skateboarders	Self	Documentary
2012	Waiting for Lightning	Self	Documentary
2012	Nitro Circus: The Movie	Self	Documentary
2013	The Motivation	Self	Documentary; producer
2015	Sneakerheadz	Self	Documentary
2017	Dumb: The Story of Big Brother Magazine	Self	Documentary
2022	Jackass Forever	Self	Guest appearance

=== Television ===
List of selected television roles
Year	Title	Role	Notes
2006–2008	Rob & Big	Self	Co-creator and producer
2009	Nitro Circus	Self	3 episodes
2009–2014	Rob Dyrdek's Fantasy Factory	Self	Creator and producer
2010	MTV's Ultimate Parkour Challenge	Self	Executive producer
2011–present	Ridiculousness	Self (host)	Creator and producer
2012	Punk'd	Self	2 episodes
2012–2015	Wild Grinders	Lil' Rob / Gene	Animated series; creator, writer, and executive producer
2013	MTV Cribs	Self	Episode 12.1: "Retro Cribs"
2014	Snack-Off	—N/a	Creator, executive producer
2016–2017	Jagger Eaton's Mega Life	—N/a	Creator, executive producer
2016–2017	Crashletes	—N/a	Creator, executive producer
2016–2018	The Dude Perfect Show	—N/a	Executive producer
2017–2018	Amazingness	Self	Creator, executive producer
2020–2022	Deliciousness	Self	Creator, executive producer
2021	Adorableness	—N/a	Creator, executive producer
2021–2022	Messyness	—N/a	Creator, executive producer
