= Amazingness =

- Presented by: Rob Dyrdek
- Judges: Chris "Drama" Pfaff; Eddie Huang; Krystal Bee
- No. of seasons: 1
- No. of episodes: 8

Production
- Executive producers: Blake Levin; Paul Ricci; Rob Dyrdek; Shane Nickerson
- Production company: SuperJacket Productions

Original release
- Network: MTV
- Release: December 8, 2017 – January 19, 2018

Related
- Ridiculousness; Deliciousness; Adorableness; Messyness

Amazingness is an American talent show competition hosted by Rob Dyrdek. It ran from December 8, 2017, to January 19, 2018, on MTV.

== Format ==
Every episode features six contestants showcasing their unique talents. After each performance, the judges decide who moves on and who is eliminated. The last performer standing is awarded $10,000.

== Episodes ==
| No. | Title | Original release date | U.S. viewers (millions) |
|---|---|---|---|
| 1 | "Episode 1" | December 8, 2017 | 0.49 |
| 2 | "Episode 2" | December 15, 2017 | 0.44 |
| 3 | "Episode 3" | December 22, 2017 | 0.48 |
| 4 | "Episode 4" | December 29, 2017 | 0.39 |
| 5 | "Episode 5" | January 5, 2018 | 0.52 |
| 6 | "Episode 6" | January 12, 2018 | 0.56 |
| 7 | "Episode 7" | January 19, 2018 | 0.53 |
| 8 | "Episode 8" | January 19, 2018 | N/A |
