= Messyness =

American comedy TV series

- Genre: Clip show; Comedy
- Presented by: Nicole "Snooki" Polizzi; Tori Spelling; Adam Rippon; Teddy Ray
- Country of origin: United States
- Original language: English
- No. of seasons: 2
- No. of episodes: 30

Production
- Executive producers: Rachel Tung; Jessica Zalkind
- Running time: 22 min.
- Production companies: Thrill One Media; Gorilla Flicks; MTV Entertainment Studios

Original release
- Network: MTV
- Release: August 23, 2021 – October 6, 2022

Related
- Ridiculousness; Amazingness; Deliciousness; Adorableness

Messyness is an American comedy clip show that premiered on MTV on August 23, 2021. It is hosted by Nicole Polizzi and co-hosted by actress Tori Spelling, Olympian Adam Rippon, and comedian Teddy Ray. The series is the fourth spin off of Ridiculousness. The show focuses on the "most debaucherous clips found on the internet – everything from awkward proposals, to nights out gone wrong and cheaters caught red handed. Messyness seeks to celebrate dating, partying and all the messy stages of young adulthood." The series was greenlit in June 2021. It was renewed for a second season for 2022.

== Episodes ==
=== Series overview ===
Season	Episodes	Originally released	
Season	Episodes	First released	Last released
1	20	August 23, 2021	January 27, 2022
2	10	September 15, 2022	October 6, 2022

=== Season 1 (2021–22) ===
No. overall	No. in season	Title	Original release date	US viewers (millions)
1	1	"Wide Open Bar"	August 23, 2021	0.21
2	2	"Drunk and Disorderly"	August 23, 2021	0.18
3	3	"Hot Mess Summer"	August 24, 2021	0.15
4	4	"Making of a Merkin"	August 24, 2021	0.15
5	5	"Dads After Dark"	August 25, 2021	0.12
6	6	"Personal Party Trainers"	August 25, 2021	0.15
7	7	"Sexy Sauce"	August 26, 2021	0.11
8	8	"Death of the Party"	August 26, 2021	0.19
9	9	"To Dye For"	August 27, 2021	0.14
10	10	"Liquid Courage"	August 27, 2021	0.17
11	11	"Sneaky Drinkies"	December 27, 2021	0.18
12	12	"Real Intimacy"	December 27, 2021	0.18
13	13	"I'm Here, Bitches"	December 28, 2021	0.16
14	14	"The New Me"	December 29, 2021	0.20
15	15	"Drinking and Entering"	December 30, 2021	0.19
16	16	"Vegas, Baby"	December 31, 2021	0.17
17	17	"Seen It All"	January 6, 2022	0.21
18	18	"Woke Up Like This"	January 13, 2022	0.18
19	19	"Going Full Tori"	January 20, 2022	0.17
20	20	"Bad and Bushy"	January 27, 2022	0.18

=== Season 2 (2022) ===
No. overall	No. in season	Title	Original release date	US viewers (millions)
21	1	"Employee of the Blunt"	September 15, 2022	0.17
22	2	"Power Purses"	September 15, 2022	0.09
23	3	"Weenies in the Wild"	September 22, 2022	0.12
24	4	"Dance Trance"	September 22, 2022	0.10
25	5	"Bar Souvenirs"	September 29, 2022	0.12
26	6	"Wonderfully Wasted"	September 29, 2022	0.11
27	7	"Swag Gone Bad"	September 29, 2022	0.11
28	8	"Messy Besties"	October 6, 2022	0.16
29	9	"Two Types of Messes"	October 6, 2022	0.14
30	10	"Sober Up!"	October 6, 2022	0.15
