= Teddy Ray =

American comedian and actor (1990–2022)

- Born: Theadore Brown; July 30, 1990; Los Angeles, California, U.S.
- Died: August 12, 2022 (aged 32); Rancho Mirage, California, U.S.
- Occupations: Actor; comedian
- Years active: 2014-2022

Theadore Brown (July 30, 1990 – August 12, 2022), known professionally as Teddy Ray, was an American comedian and actor. He was best known for his stand-up acts and for the Internet memes inspired by his viral videos.

== Early life ==
Ray was born and raised in Los Angeles.

== Career ==
Ray made his television debut on ComicView. He later gained prominence as a comedian after appearing on comedy series such as Comedy Central and All Def Comedy. Ray also appeared on a number of comedy shows including Wild ‘N Out (season 8), MTV's Messyness, and as a bailiff on HBO's PAUSE with Sam Jay.

Ray was a regular performer at comedy clubs such as The Improv and Laugh Factory.

== Death ==
Ray died on August 12, 2022, at the age of 32.
