= Chevrolet Aveo =

Subcompact car

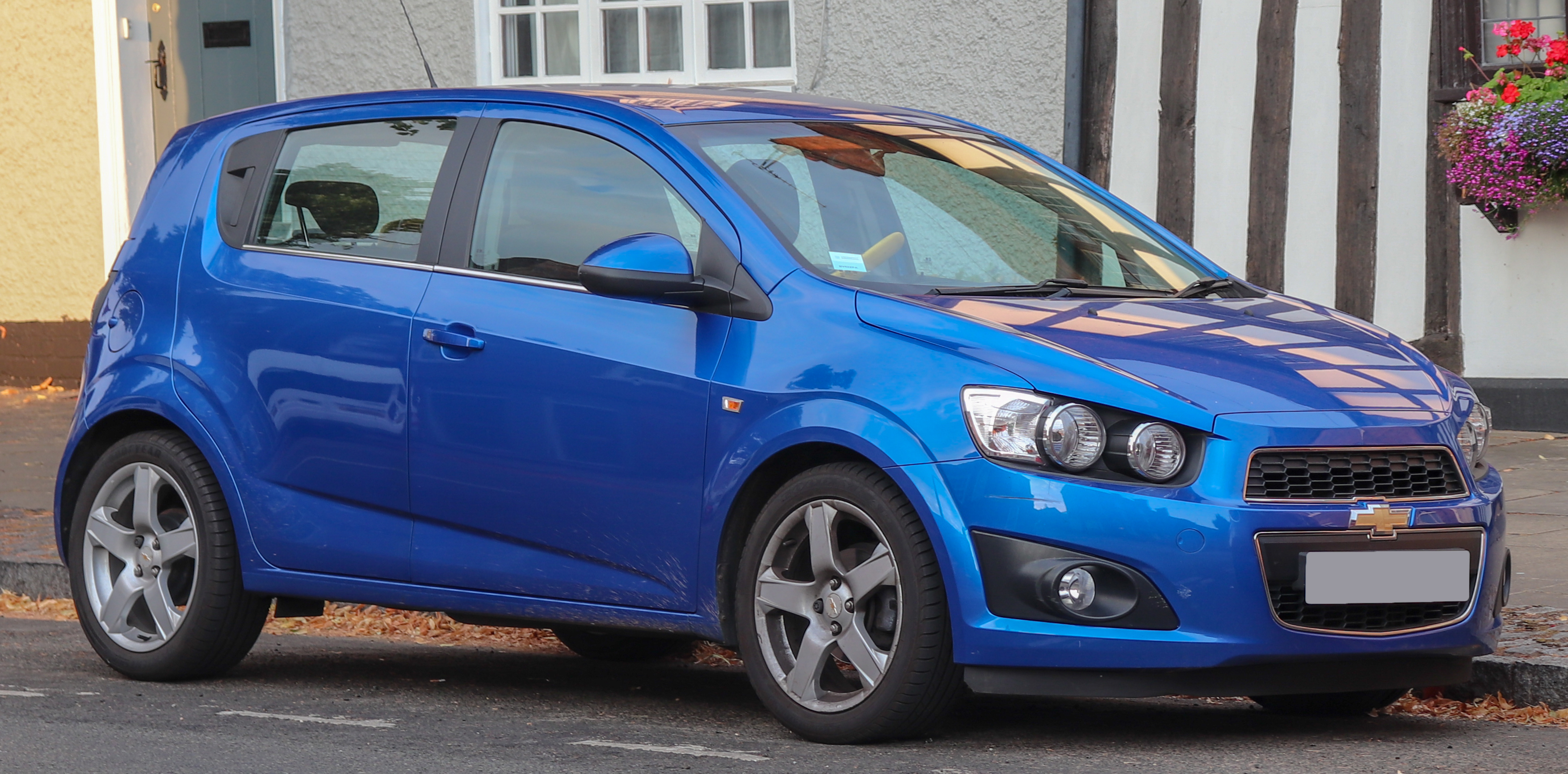

Overview
- Manufacturer: General Motors (2002–2020); SAIC-GM-Wuling (2023–present)
- Also called: Daewoo Kalos; Daewoo Gentra; Chevrolet Sonic (2011–2020); Holden Barina (2005–2018); Chevrolet Sail (2023–present)
- Production: 2002–present

Body and chassis
- Class: Subcompact car (B)
- Layout: Front-engine, front-wheel-drive

Chronology
- Predecessor: Chevrolet Metro; Daewoo Lanos
- Successor: Chevrolet Onix Chevrolet Sail Chevrolet Cavalier (fourth generation) (Mexico)

The Chevrolet Aveo (/əˈveɪ.oʊ/ ə-VAY-oh) is a five-seat, front-wheel drive subcompact car (B-segment) marketed by General Motors (GM) since 2002 over two generations. Originally developed by South Korean manufacturer Daewoo Motors and marketed as the Daewoo Kalos (Korean: 대우 칼로스), the takeover of Daewoo by GM to form GM Daewoo Auto & Technology (GMDAT) resulted in the car's marketing in 120 countries under seven brands (Chevrolet, Daewoo, ZAZ, Holden, Pontiac, Ravon and Suzuki) — prominently as the Chevrolet Aveo.

The second-generation Aveo, developed by GM Korea (formerly GMDAT), was introduced in 2011 and was also marketed as the Chevrolet Sonic in markets including the Americas, Japan, Middle East, South Africa and several Southeast Asian markets. Production of the second-generation model ended in October 2020.

Since 2017, GM marketed the Chinese market Chevrolet Sail sedan in Mexico and other Central American countries as the Aveo. Developed by GM PATAC in China and produced by joint venture SAIC-GM, it was positioned below the more advanced Sonic. In 2023, GM introduced a new generation to Mexico and Central America in a sedan and hatchback form, developed and manufactured by another Chinese joint venture, SAIC-GM-Wuling.

== First generation (T200; 2002) ==
First generation
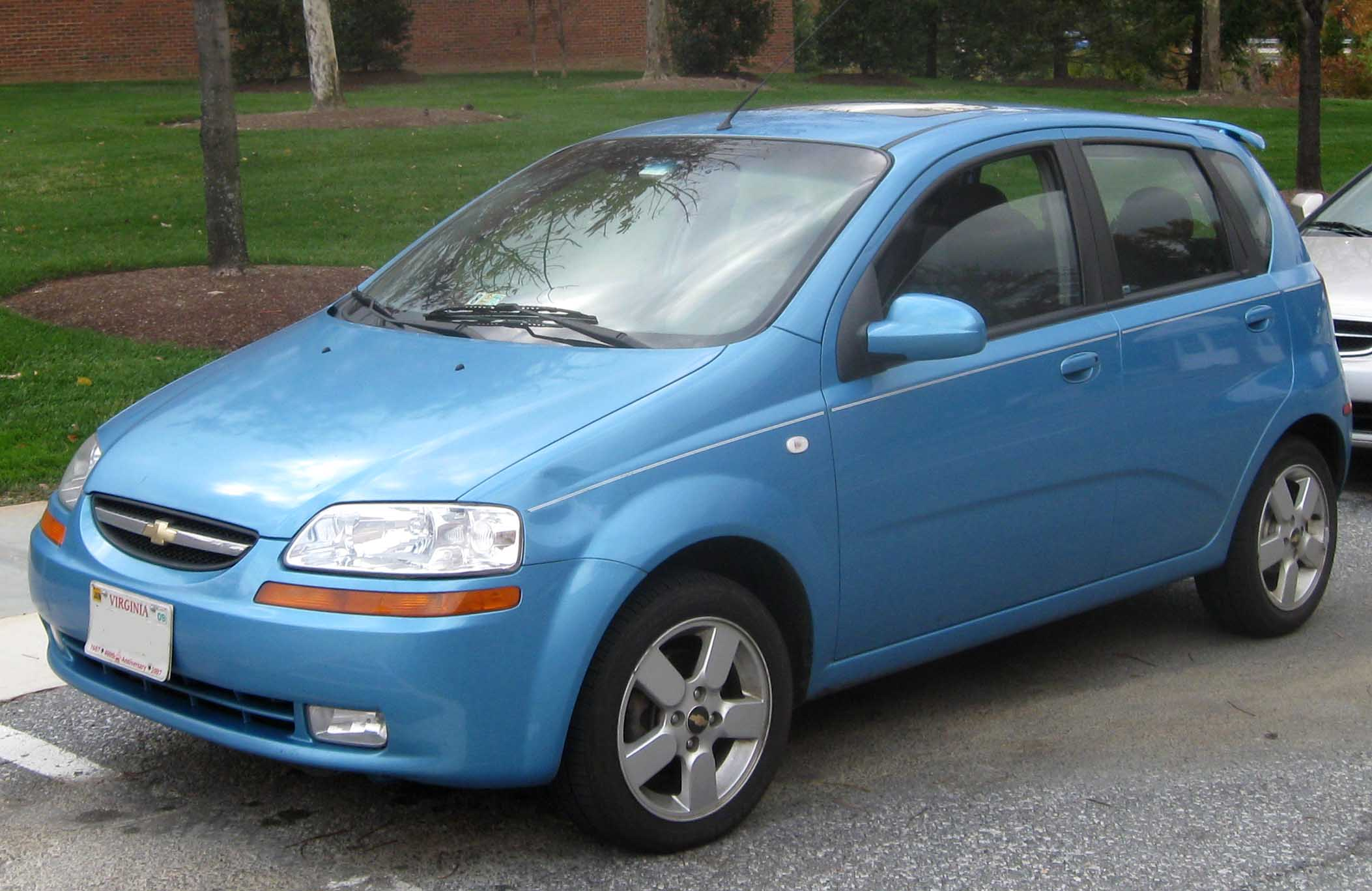
- Chevrolet Aveo hatch (T200, pre-facelift)

Overview
- Model code: T200; T250 (2005 facelift)
- Also called: Chevrolet Kalos; Chevrolet Lova; Chevrolet Nexia; Daewoo Gentra; Daewoo Kalos; Holden Barina (TK); Pontiac G3; Pontiac G3 Wave; Pontiac Wave; Ravon Nexia R3; Suzuki Swift+ (Canada); ZAZ Vida
- Production: 2002–2011 (South Korea); 2002–2023 (under license)
- Model years: 2004–2011

Body and chassis
- Body style: 3/5-door hatchback 4-door sedan

=== T200 ===
GM Daewoo introduced the Daewoo Kalos in September 2002, based on a new platform, replacing the Daewoo Lanos (T100). Under development before Daewoo's bankruptcy, the Kalos was the company's first new model introduction following its subsequent takeover by General Motors. Manufacture of the Kalos began in early March 2002, with pre-production prototypes shown at the Geneva Auto Show in April 2002. The nameplate Kalos derives from the Greek word καλός (kalós) for "beautiful" and "good".

Originally designed by Italdesign, the Kalos derives directly from the "Kalos Dream" concept vehicle first presented at the 2000 Paris Motor Show and subsequent developmental concepts at the 2001 Frankfurt Motor Show, 2002 Geneva Motor Show, and 2003 Geneva Motor Show. During this three-year development period Daewoo was struggling financially.

The Kalos was sold in three body styles: a 4-door sedan and 5-door hatchback from the beginning of production in 2002, and a 3-door hatchback available in certain European markets beginning in 2005. Two different T200 front-end styling designs were sold: when released in 2002, the T200's headlamps were detached from the horizontal amber turn signal strip, located directly below. This detached style, used primarily in South Korea and North America, was used in conjunction with a semi-elliptical grille. When sales in Europe began in 2003, the headlights were an integrated unit that slanted upwards from the "V-shaped" grille towards the front fenders. In Australia, when the Daewoo Kalos was introduced in 2003, the hatchback featured the integrated lighting arrangement, with the detached style used to differentiate the sedans. In South Korea, where the detached lights were used at first, the integrated design was later utilized as a facelift.

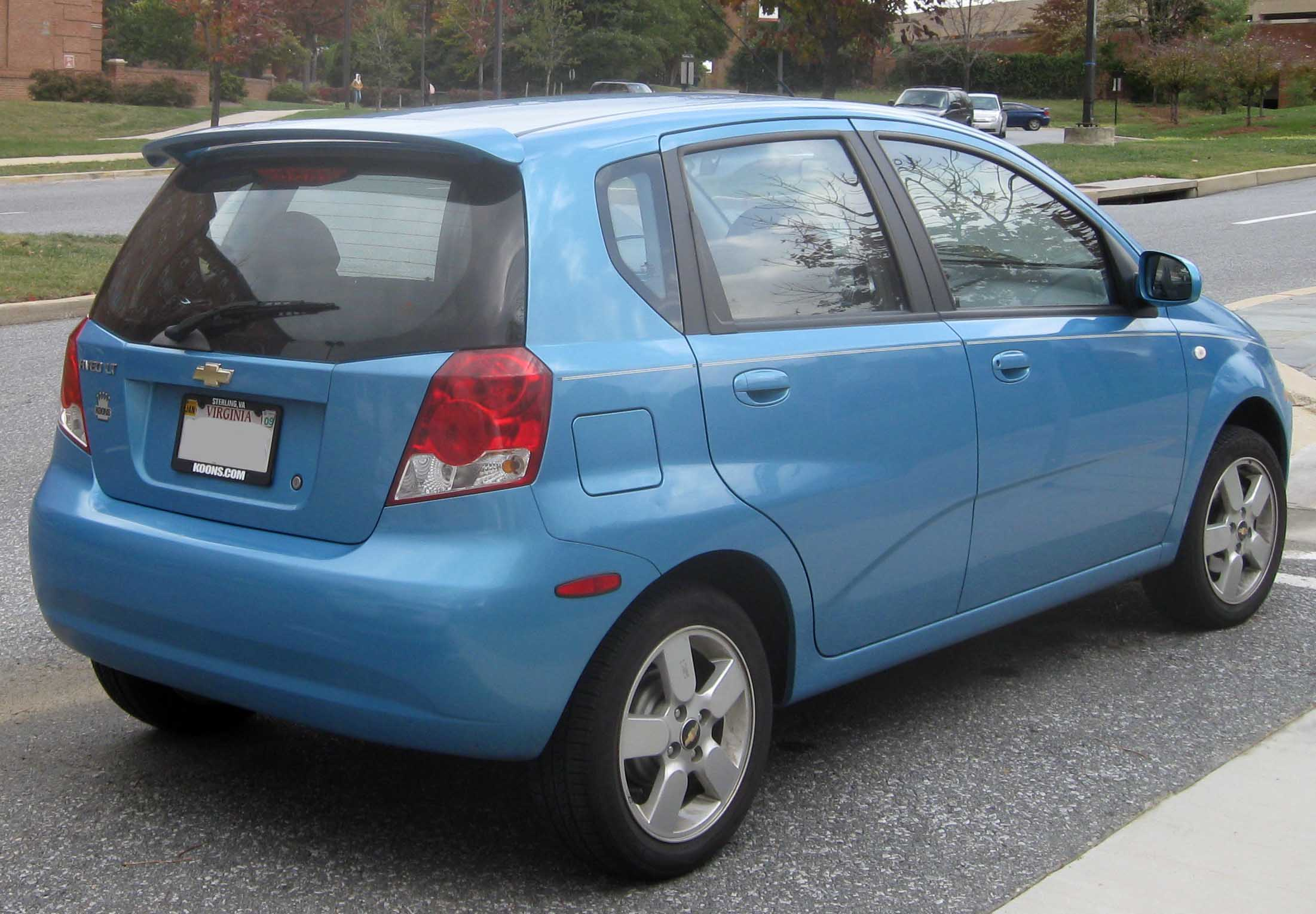
Chevrolet Aveo 5-door hatchback (T200, pre-facelift)

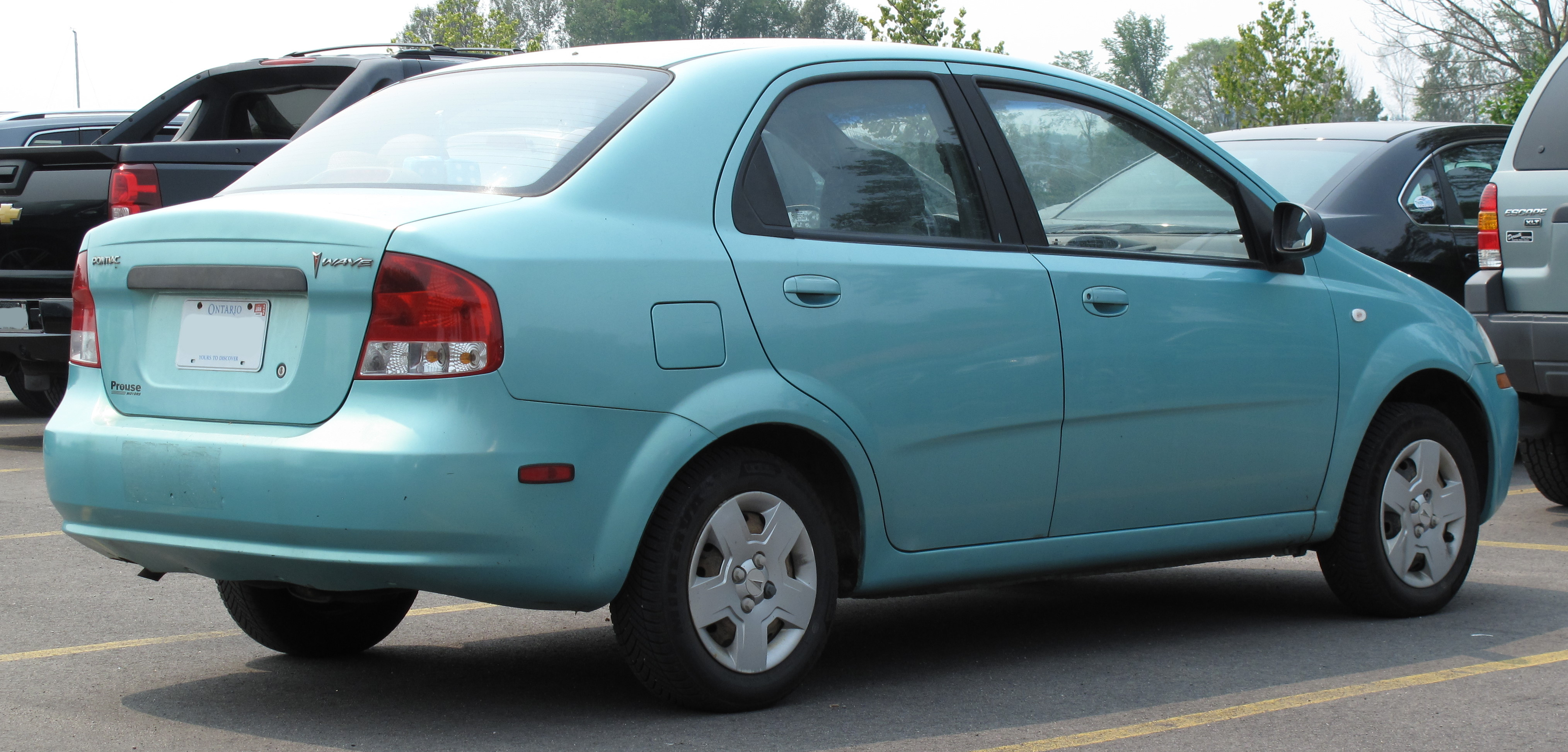
Pontiac Wave sedan (T200, pre-facelift)

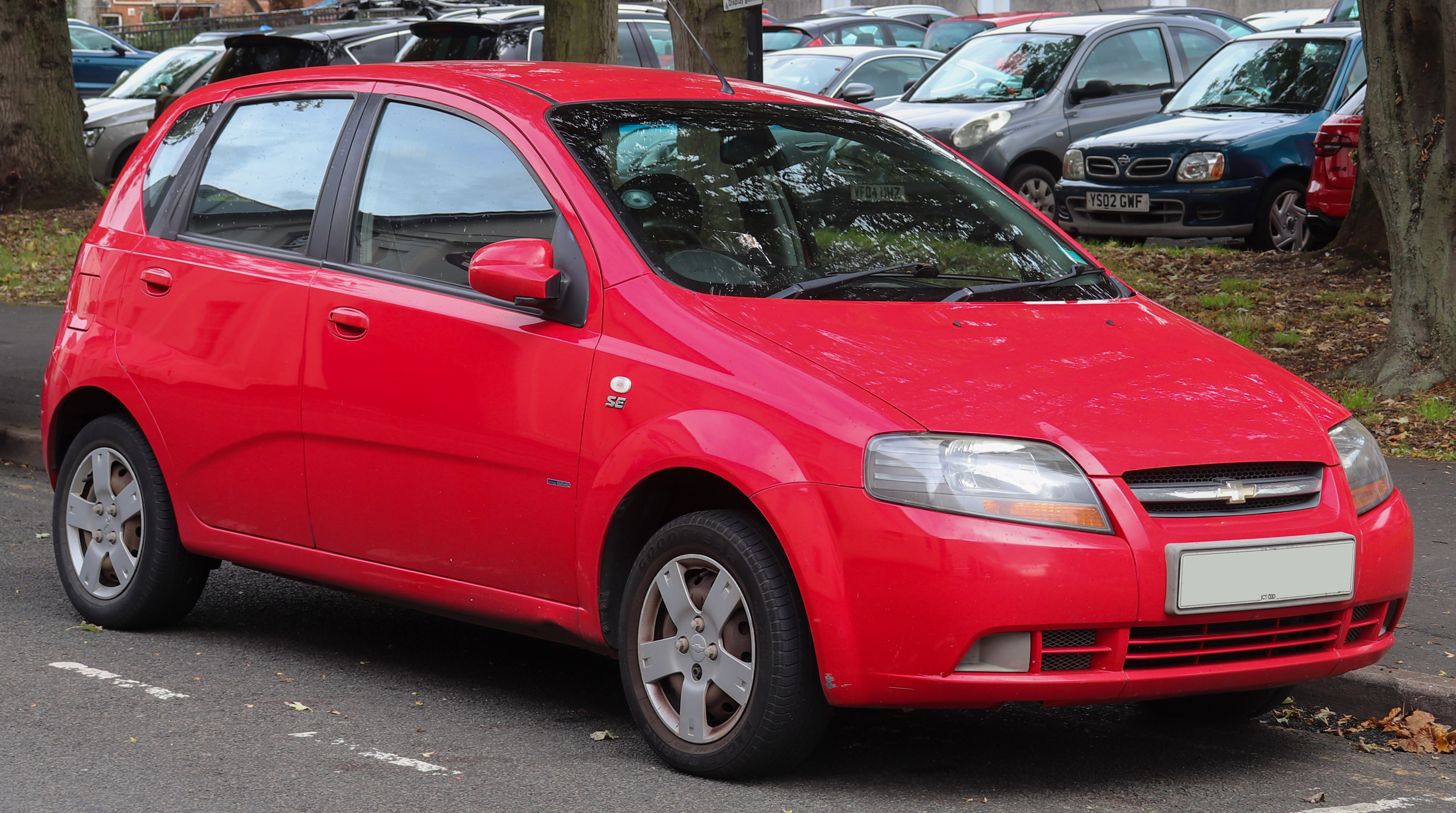
Chevrolet Kalos 5-door hatchback (T200, facelift)

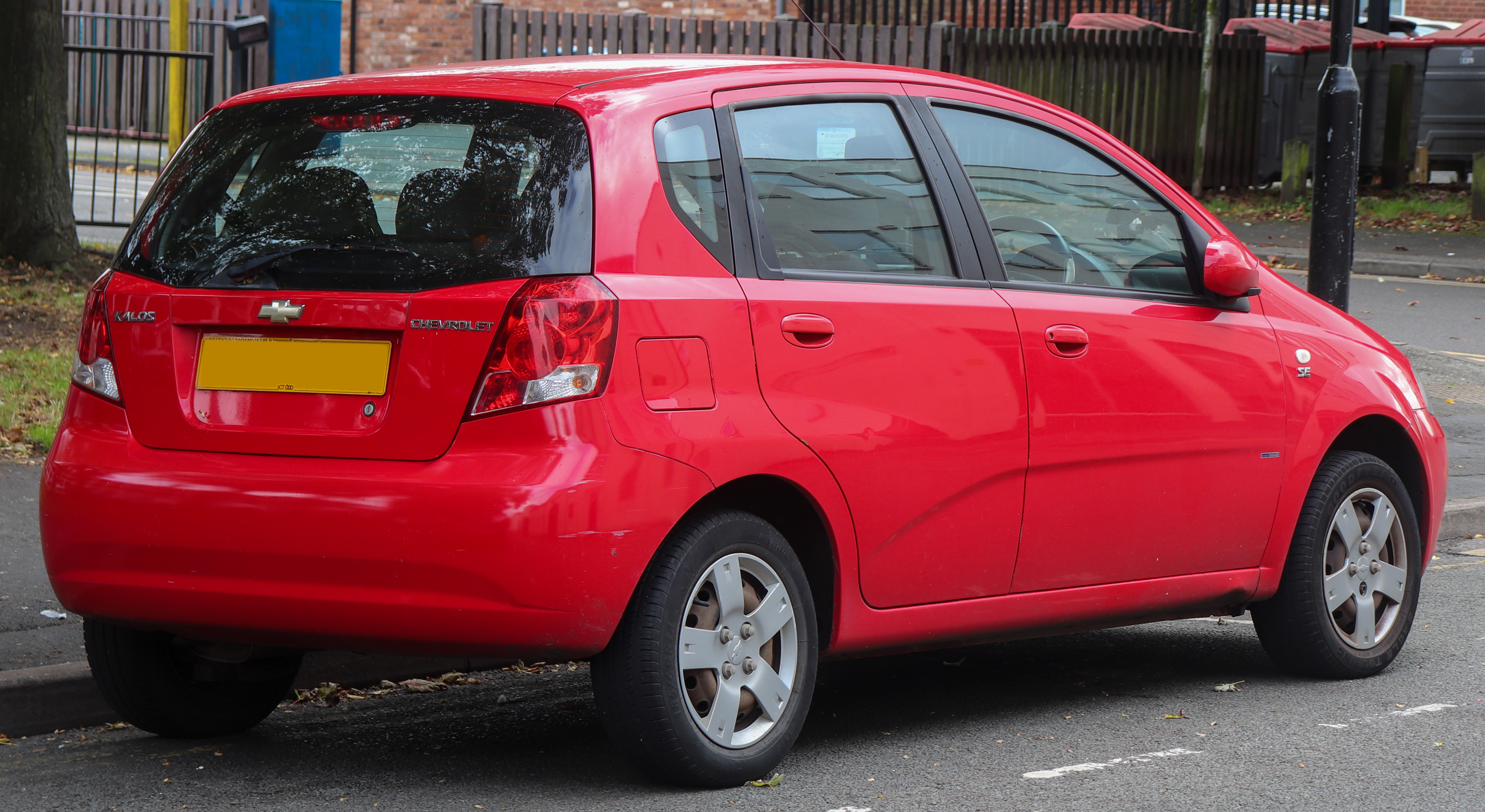
Chevrolet Kalos 5-door hatchback (T200, facelift)

=== T250 ===
GM introduced the heavily facelifted sedan at the 2005 Auto Shanghai, designed in cooperation with PATAC. Bearing the internal code T250 and marketed in South Korea as the Daewoo Gentra, revisions included exterior styling changes, a new interior instrument panel and minor equipment changes, including increased sound deadening. Incorporation of the radio antenna into the rear glass and extensive wind tunnel testing helped reduce the coefficient of drag from 0.348 to 0.326.

A facelifted hatchback with the sedan's updated instrument panel was presented as the Chevrolet Aveo during the 2007 Frankfurt Motor Show, to be marketed globally. The Korean market received its own distinct restyle of the hatchback, the Gentra X, whose bumper without the distinctly "Chevrolet" split grille was also used for the Pontiac, Holden and Suzuki variants. In the USA, the Aveo was marketed as the "lowest-priced [new] car in America."

US-market Aveo and Aveo5s have a 1.6-litre (1,598-cubic-centimetre) inline-four engine producing 77 kW (103 hp; 105 PS) at 5800 rpm.

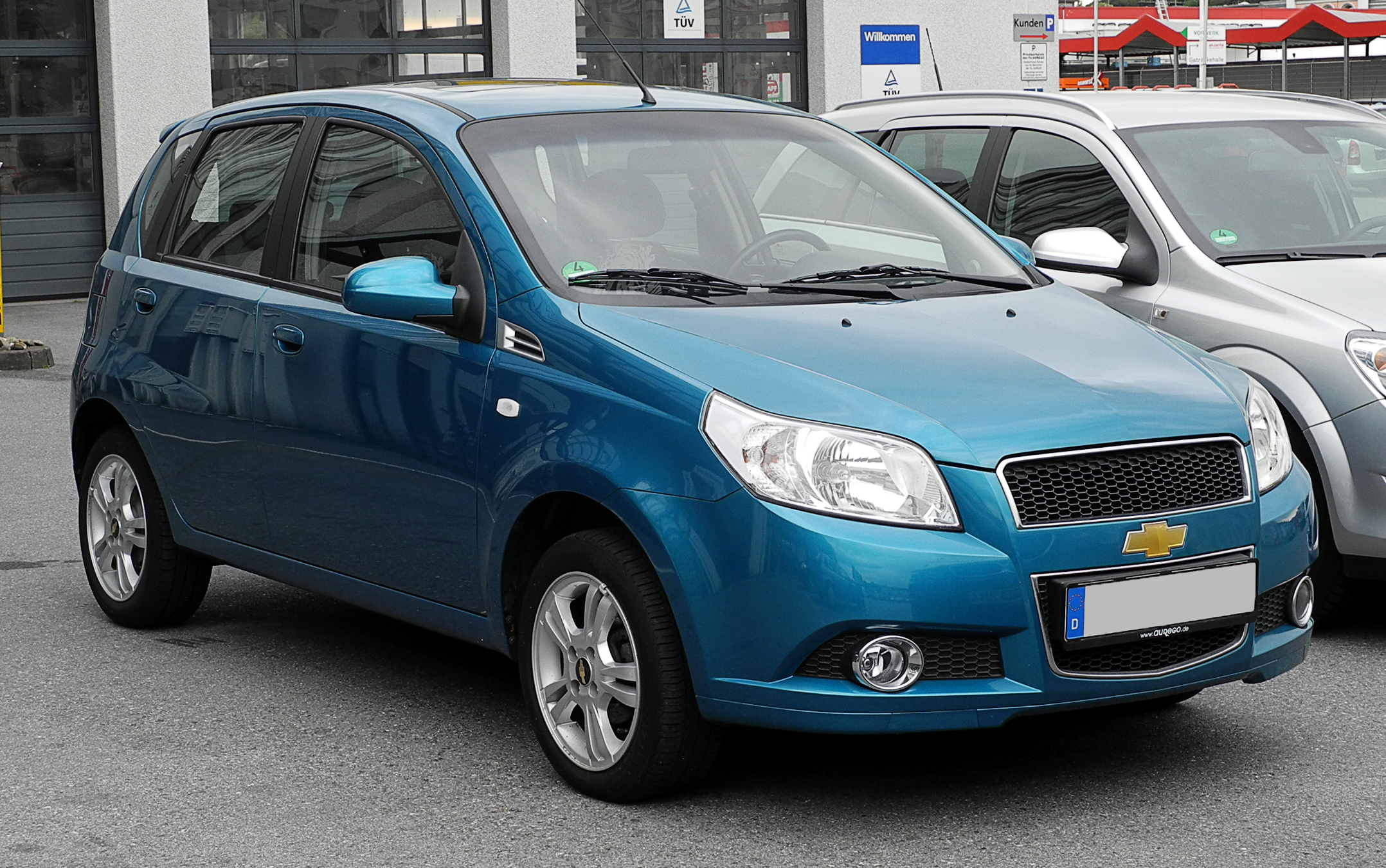
Chevrolet Aveo 5-door hatchback (T250)

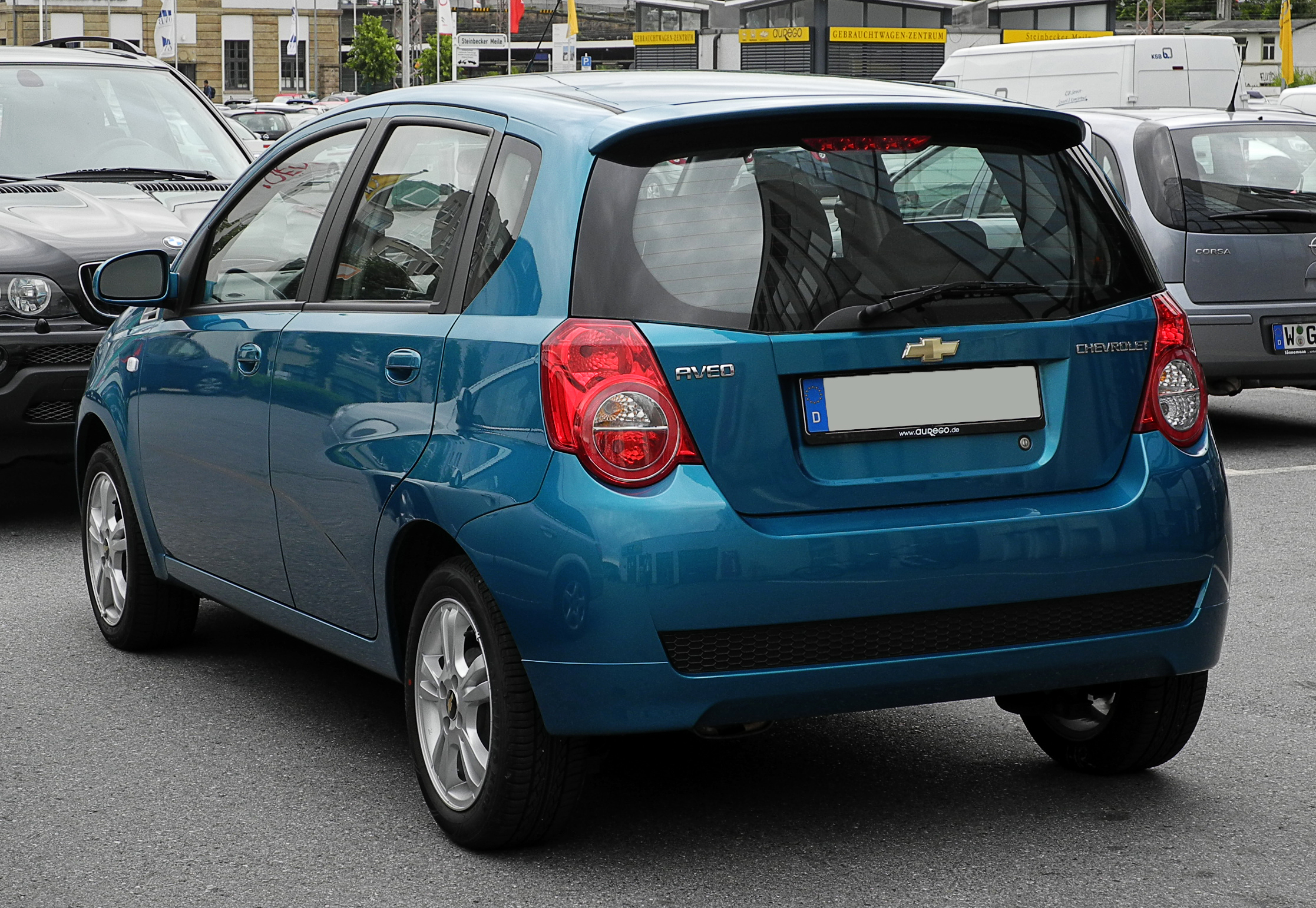
Chevrolet Aveo 5-door hatchback (T250)

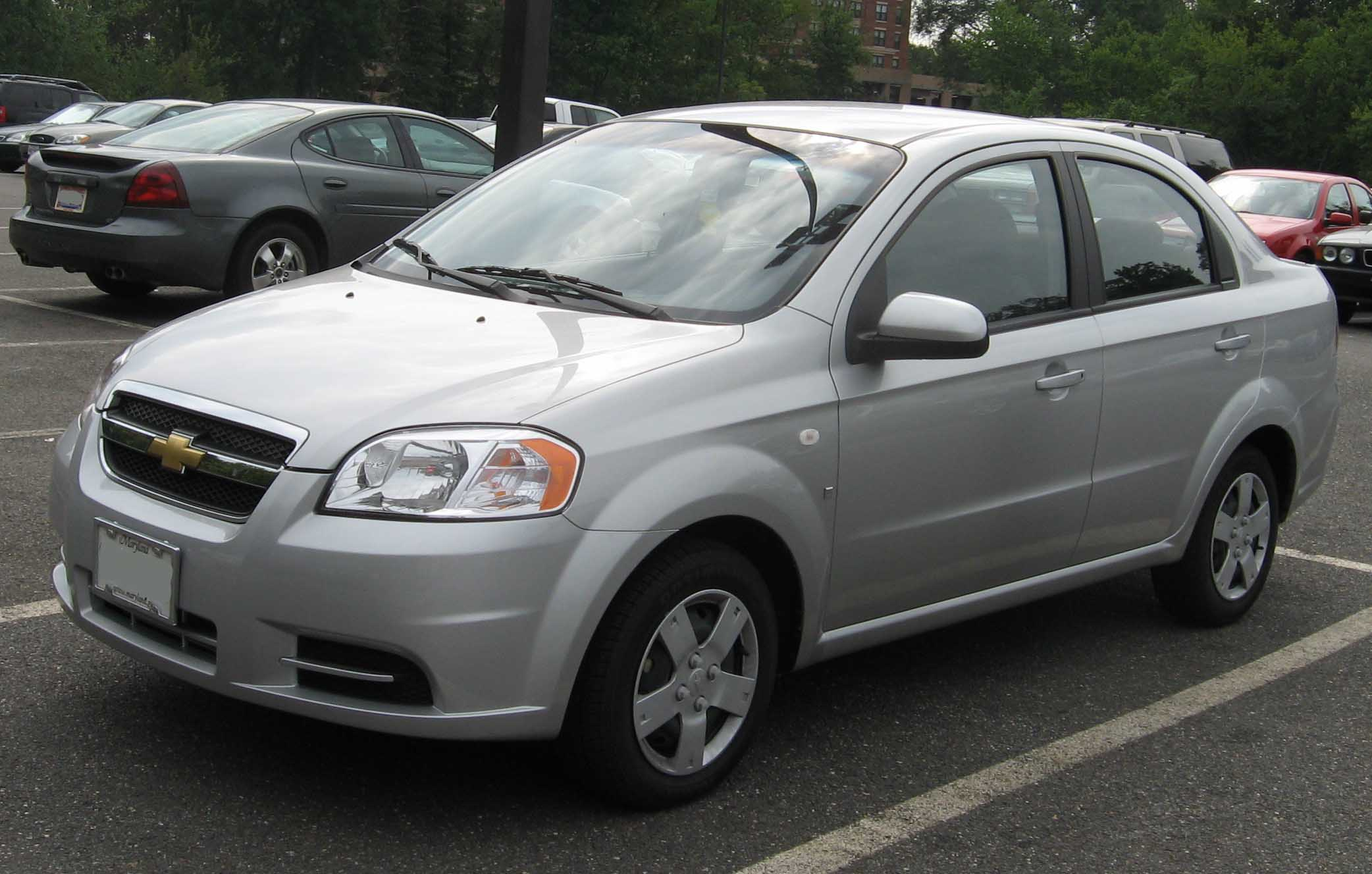
Chevrolet Aveo sedan (T250)

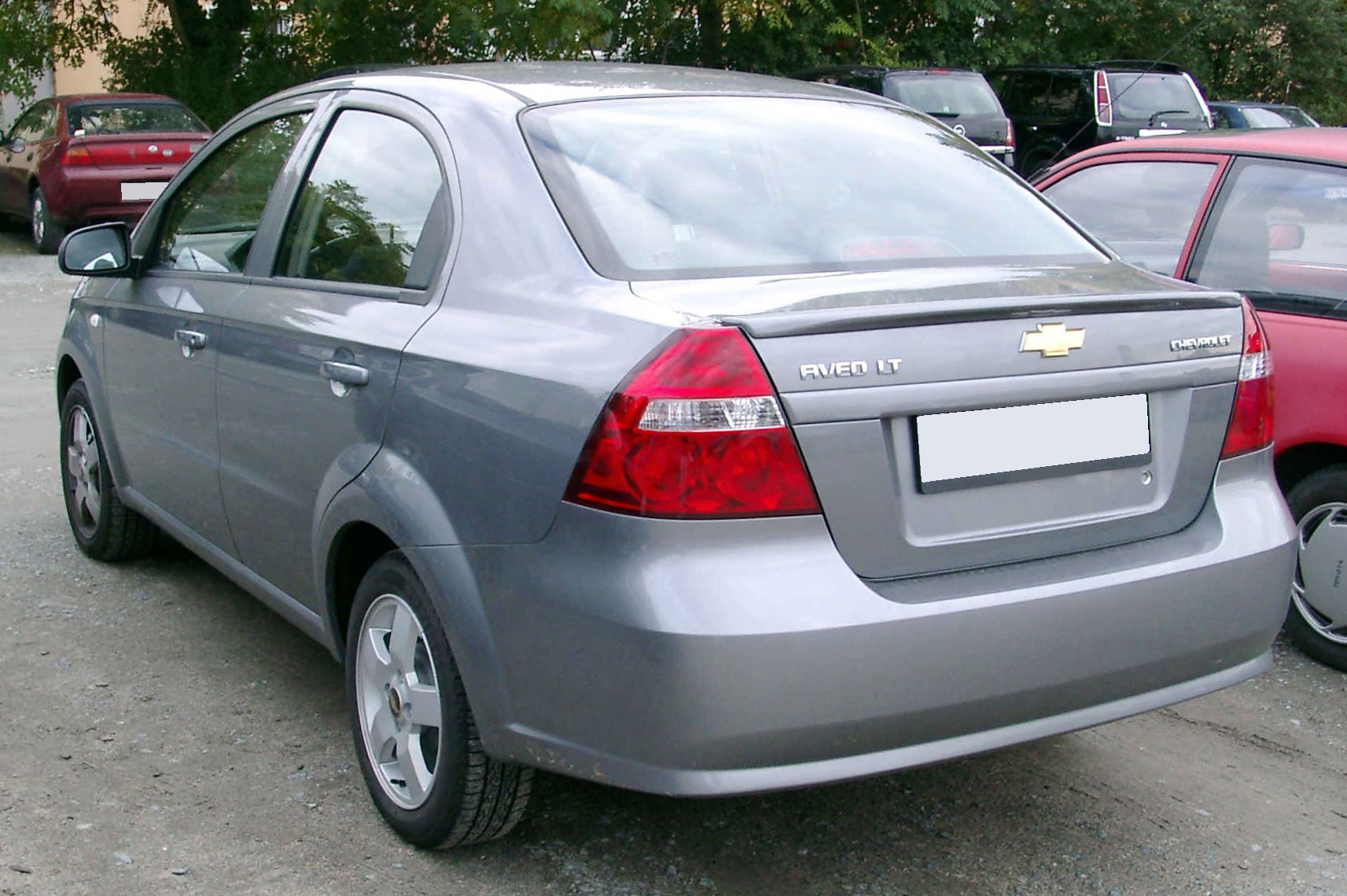
Chevrolet Aveo sedan (T250)

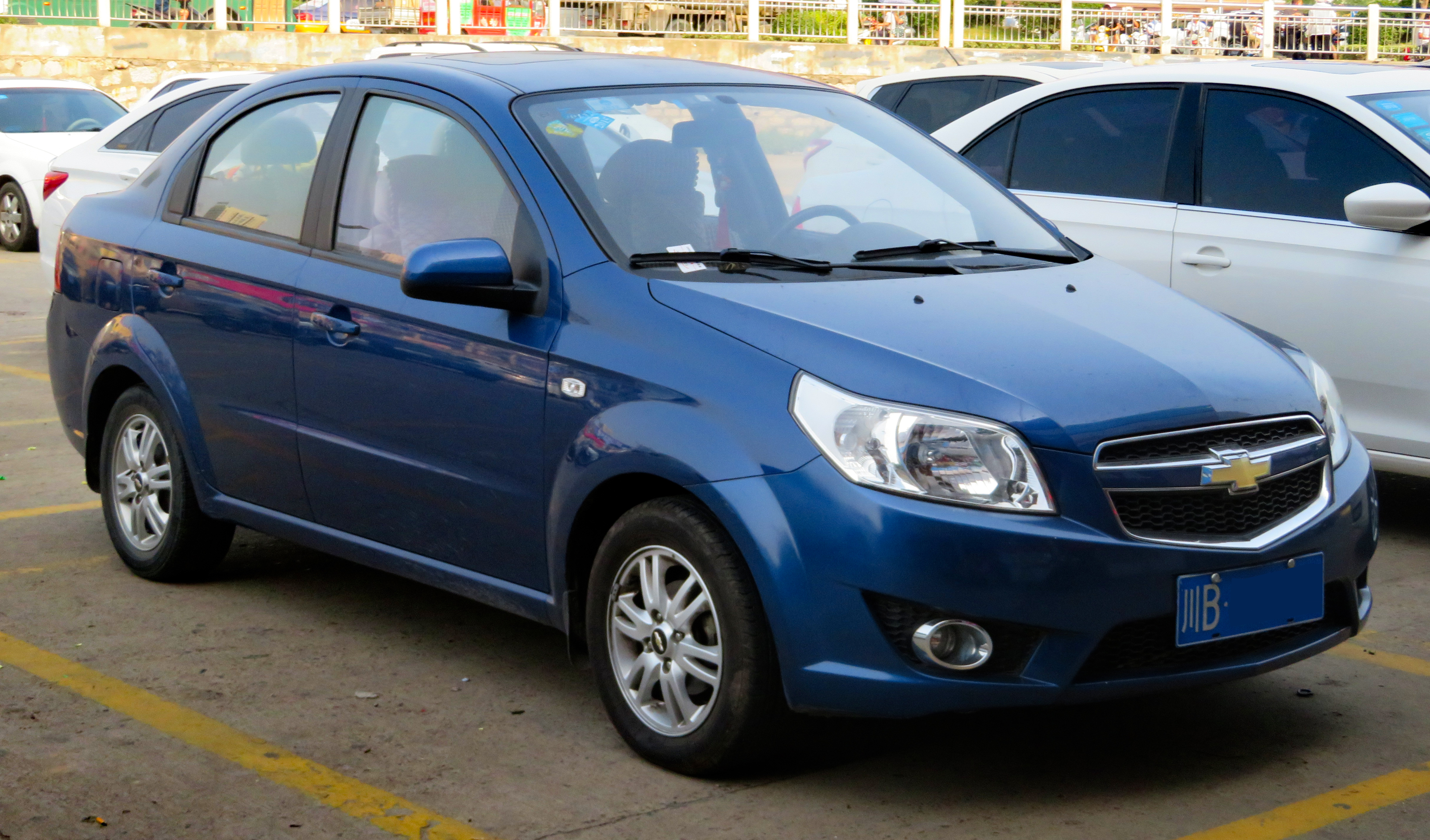
Chevrolet Lova sedan (T250)

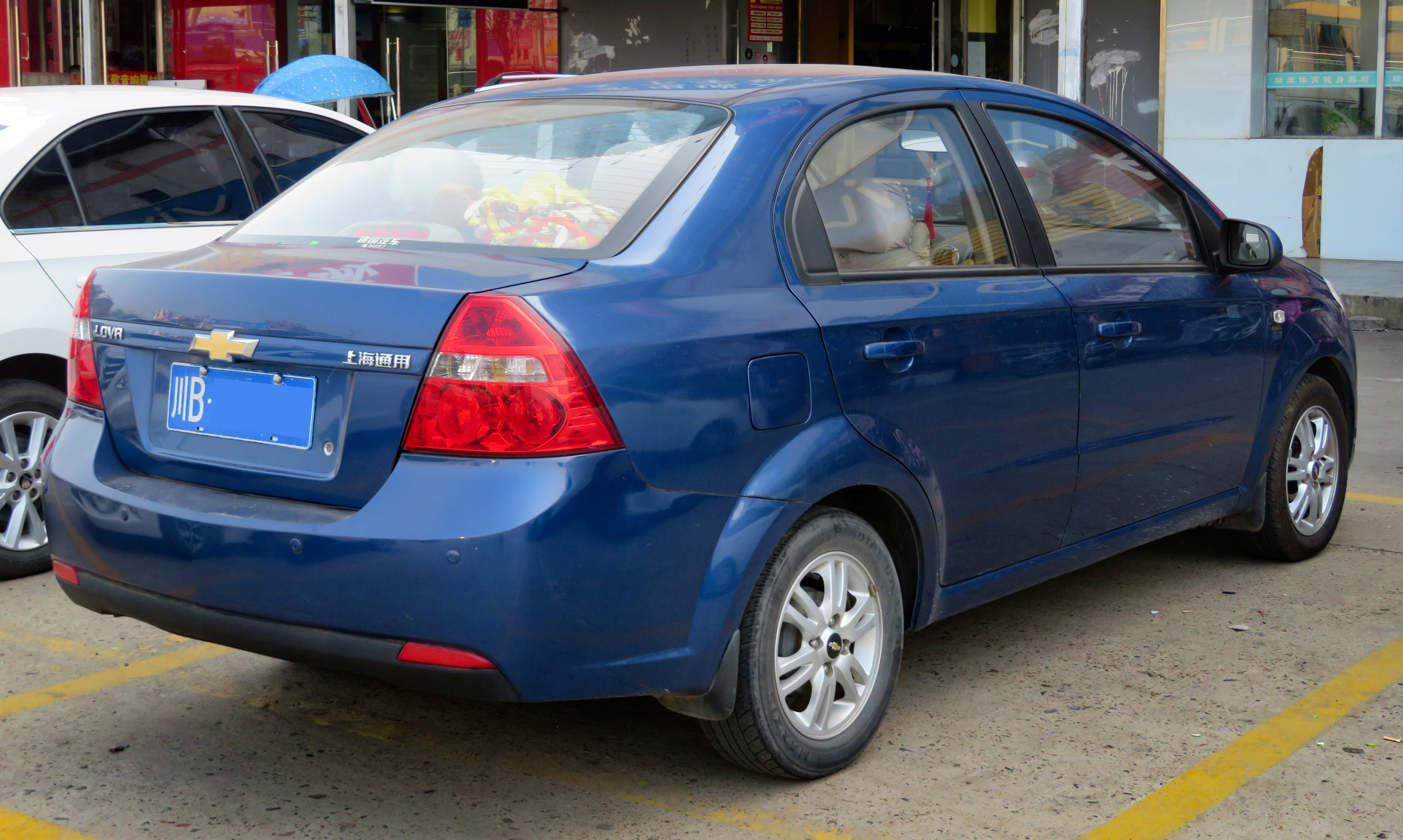
Chevrolet Lova sedan (T250)

==== ZAZ Vida ====
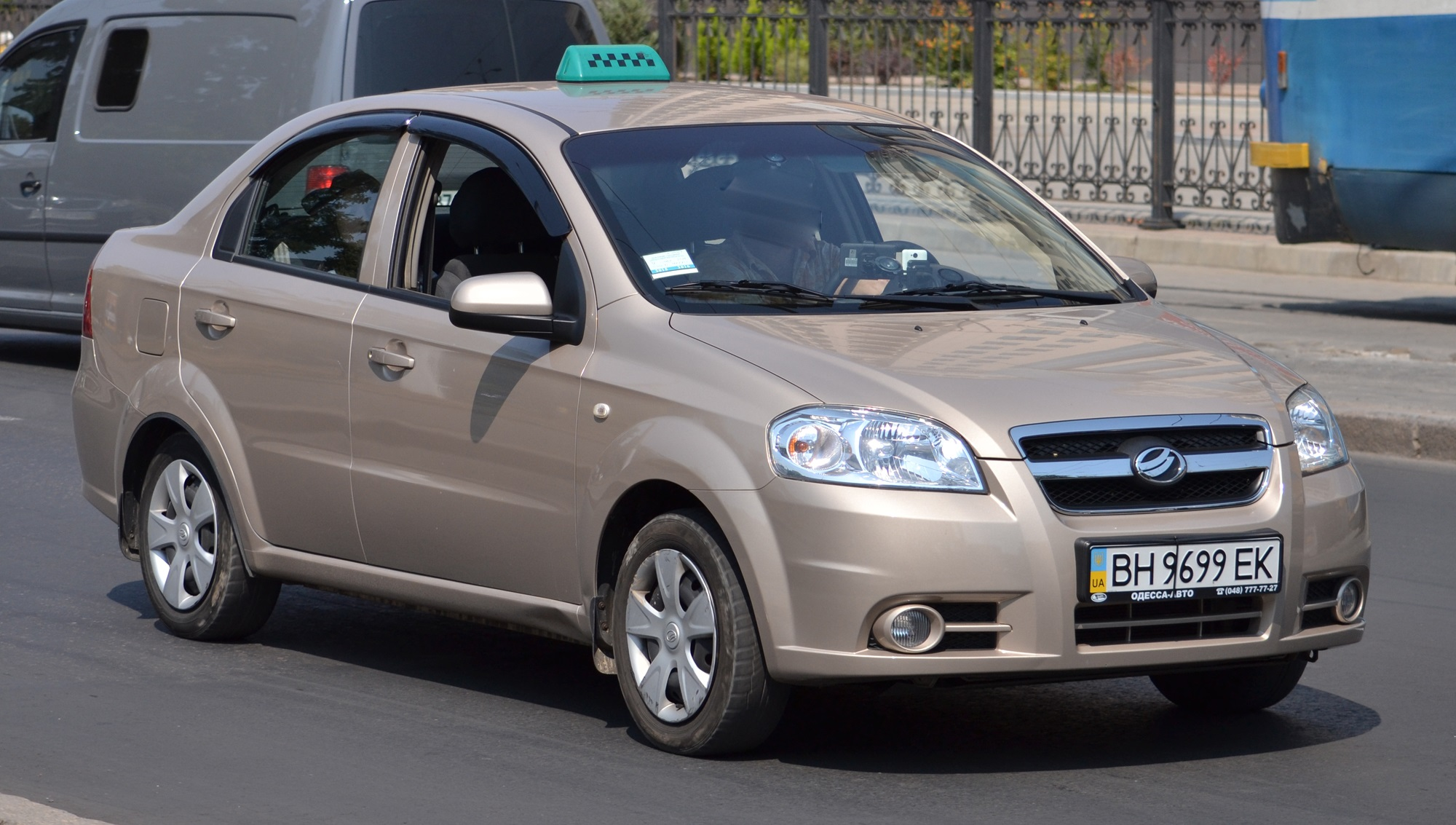
ZAZ Vida

ZAZ Vida is a licensed copy of the Chevrolet Aveo, serial production began in early 2012.. The presence of 15% Ukrainian components was declared, which was increased to 51%. The Zaporizhzhian Automobile Plant (ZAZ) produced 10 thousand cars in 2012..

In 2016, production of the ZAZ Vida Cargo vehicle with a van body and a carrying capacity of 750 kg began.

==== Ravon Nexia R3 ====
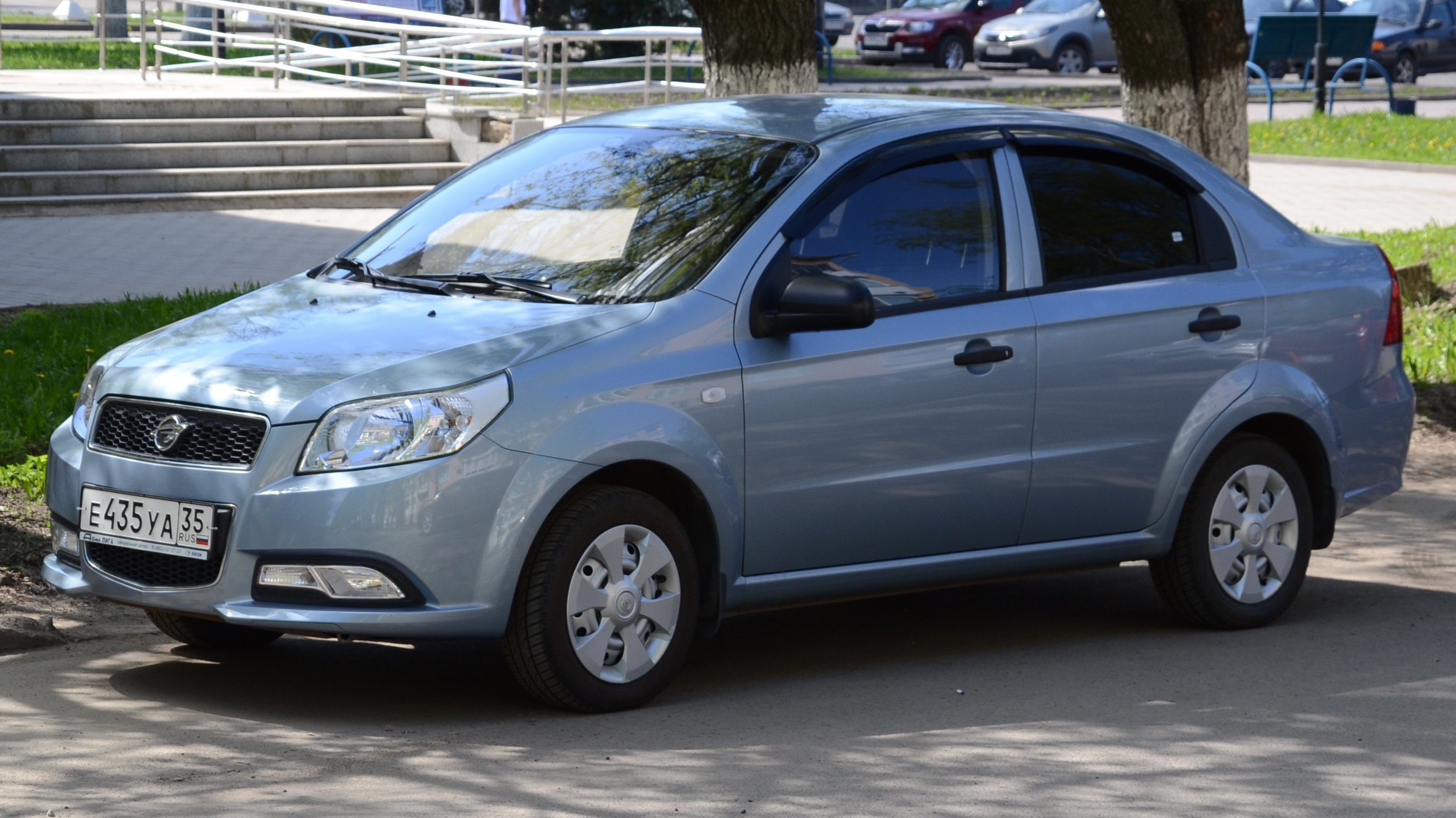
Ravon Nexia R3

The refreshed T250 Aveo sedan was launched in Uzbekistan and Russia in 2016 as Ravon Nexia R3. The car is produced at the GM Uzbekistan plant. The Ravon Nexia R3 is available with the 1.5-liter petrol engine (105 hp) paired with the 5-speed manual or the 6-speed automatic. After 2020 it was renamed to Chevrolet Nexia and was discontinued in 2023.

== Second generation (T300; 2011) ==
Second generation
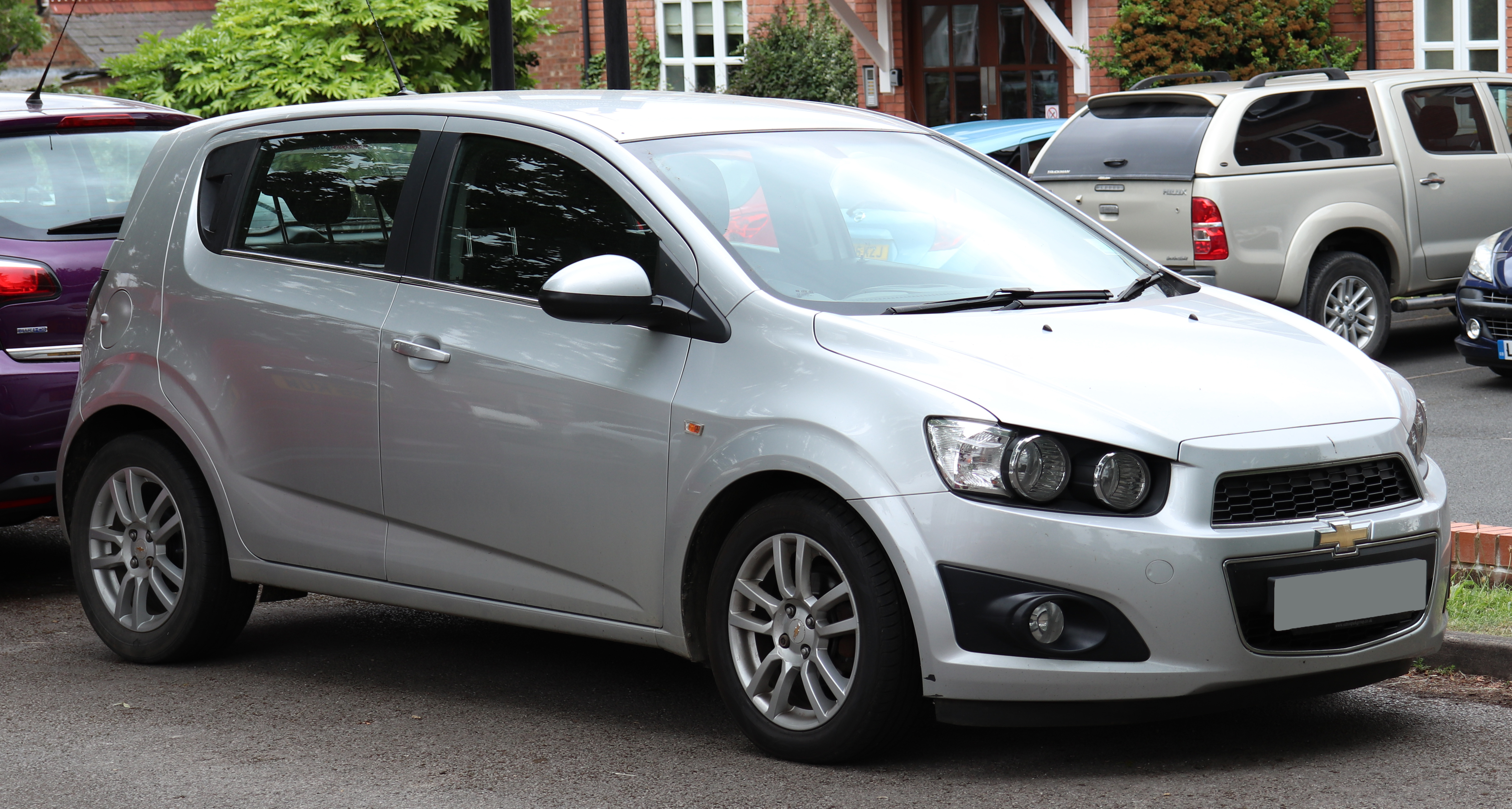

Overview
- Model code: T300
- Also called: Chevrolet Sonic; Holden Barina
- Production: 2011–2020; 2012–2015 (Thailand, Russia)
- Model years: 2012–2020
- Assembly: South Korea: Bupyeong-gu, Incheon (GM Korea); United States: Orion Township, Michigan (Orion Assembly); China: Yantai, Shandong (SAIC-GM Dongyue Plant); Mexico: Ramos Arizpe; Colombia: Bogotá (GM Colombia); Thailand: Rayong (GM Thailand); Russia: Nizhny Novgorod (GAZ)
- Designer: Kim Tae-Wan (GM Daewoo); Ondrej Koromhaz (GM Holden, 2008)

Body and chassis
- Body style: 5-door hatchback 4-door sedan
- Platform: GM Gamma II platform
- Related: Chevrolet Trax

Powertrain
- Engine: Gasoline: 1.2 L Family 0 I4; 1.4 L Family 0 I4; 1.4 L EcoTec turbo I4; 1.6 L Family 1 I4; 1.8 L LUW I4; 1.8 L LWE I4; Diesel: 1.3 L CDTi turbo I4
- Transmission: 5-speed F17 manual; 6 speed M32 manual; 6-speed 6T30 automatic; 6-speed 6T40 automatic

Dimensions
- Wheelbase: 99.4 in (2,525 mm)
- Length: Hatchback: 159 in (4,039 mm); Sedan: 173.1 in (4,397 mm)
- Width: 68.3 in (1,735 mm)
- Height: 59.7 in (1,516 mm)

The second generation Aveo debuted at the 2010 Paris Motor Show, using the Gamma II global subcompact platform. It had been previewed earlier in the year as the Aveo RS concept, shown in concept form with 19-inch wheels and a M32 six-speed manual transmission mated to a 1.4-liter, turbocharged Ecotec engine, rated at 103 kW (138 hp).

Development of the second-generation Aveo was led by GM Korea, with Opel engineers leading platform development along with significant input from engineers from Australia's Holden and Chevrolet of the United States. The Aveo marked the debut of the Gamma II global subcompact platform. Exterior design was led by GM Daewoo Executive Designer(VP) Kim Tae Wan, and Australian designer Ondrej Koromhaz from Holden who was on assignment to GM Korea from 2005 to 2007. Koromhaz described his goal for the Aveo as a "four-seat motorcycle" and took design inspiration from motorcycles, notably in the Aveo's exposed headlights and motorcycle-style instrument cluster. For US-manufactured models, the Sonic features suspension tuning by Corvette Racing engineer John Buttermore.

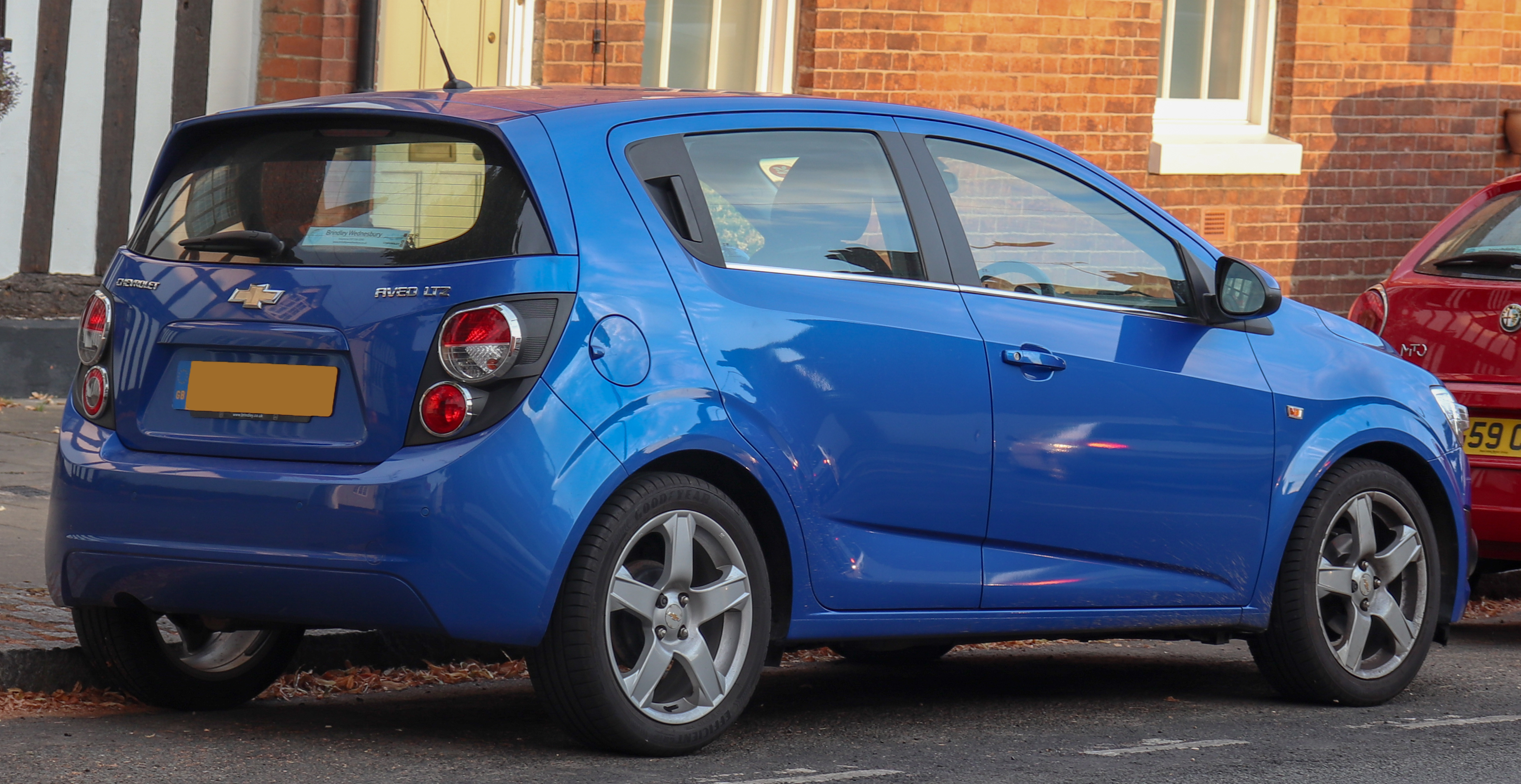
Hatchback (pre-facelift)

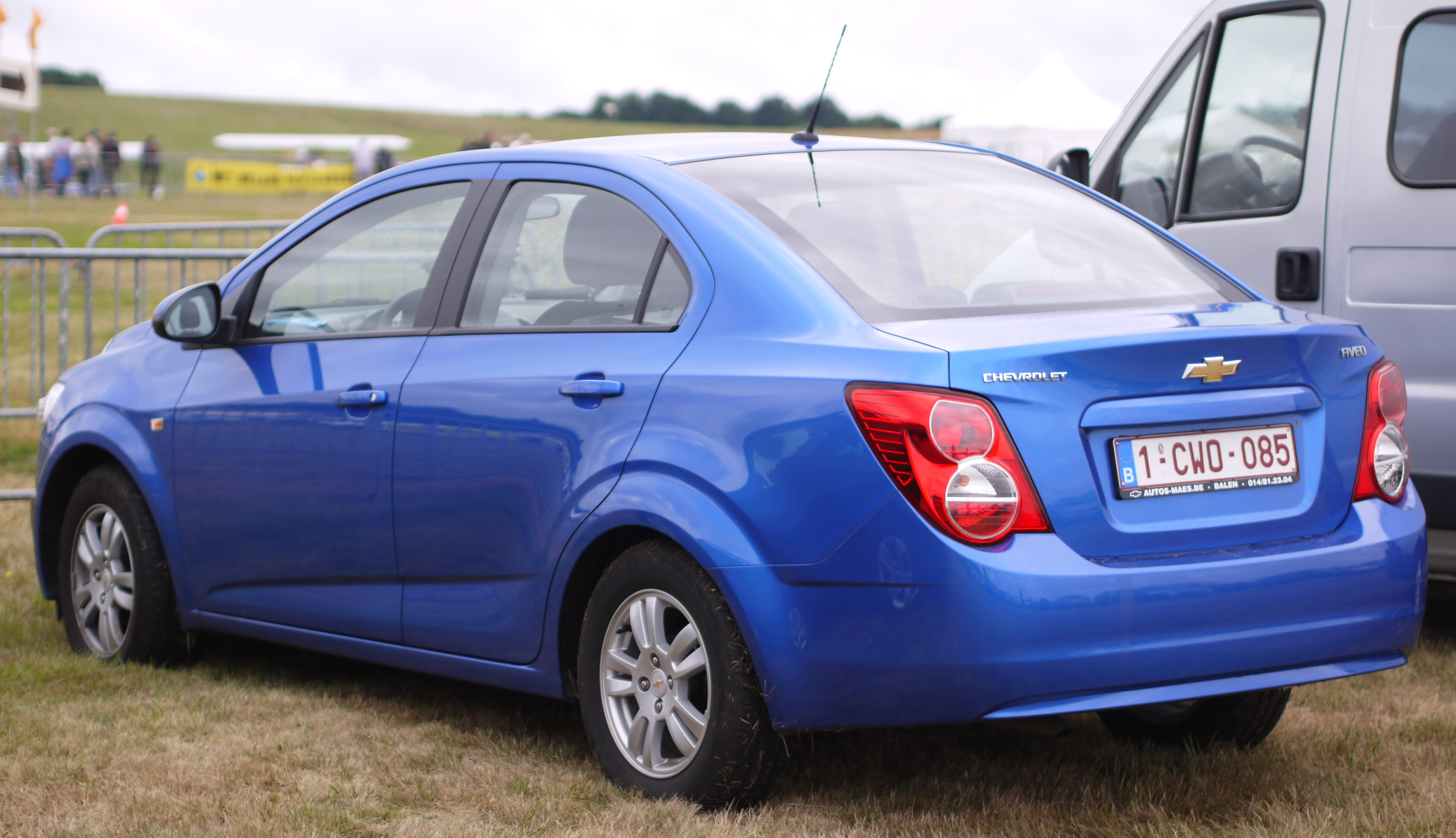
Sedan (pre-facelift)

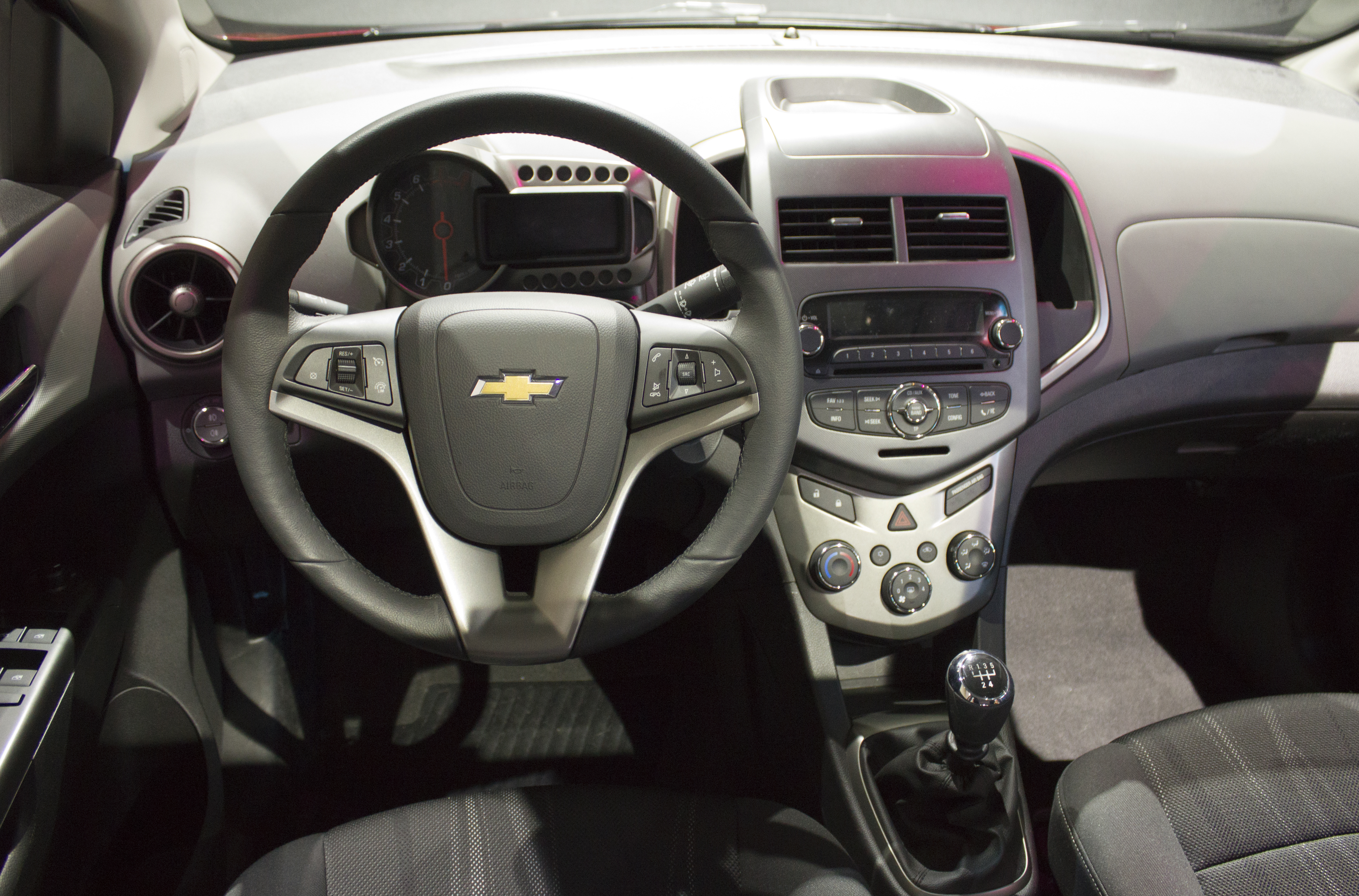
Interior

=== Marketing and production ===
Chevrolet marketed the second generation Aveo as the Chevrolet Sonic in the Americas, Japan, Middle East, South Africa and several Southeast Asian markets. In Australia and New Zealand, it was marketed as the Holden Barina until early 2019. In Europe, it retained the "Aveo" name, with sales ending in 2014, subsequent to Chevrolet's discontinuation in Europe.

The North American-spec Sonic was available as a 4-door sedan or five-door hatchback with a 1.8-liter inline-four producing 101 kW (135 hp) and 169 N⋅m (125 lb⋅ft) torque, or a 1.4-liter turbo inline-four producing 103 kW (138 hp) and 201 N⋅m (148 lb⋅ft) torque. The 1.8-liter engine uses one of few cast-iron block with timing belt; the 1.4-liter turbo engine uses a timing chain to drive the camshafts. The 1.8-liter inline-four used a standard five-speed manual or six-speed automatic transmission, while the 1.4-liter turbo used a six-speed manual transmission. The Sonic was, notably, the only car in its class assembled in America. For the 2015 model year, the US Sonic added OnStar, a 1.4-liter turbo engine that became standard on LTZ models, and an exterior color, Blue Velvet.

On August 2, 2011, the Sonic entered production at Orion Assembly, with the first cars arriving at dealerships in October.

In an industry first, the Sonic used a water-based "three-wet" paint process that eliminated the primer bake oven; reducing the paint shop footprint by 10%, and using 50% less energy per vehicle.

The Bolt (based on a different platform) joined the Aveo/Sonic on the Orion assembly line in 2016, at a combined rate of 90,000 per year.

=== Other markets ===
The Sonic had its Southeast Asian debut at the Bangkok Motor Show in March 2012, as both a 4-door sedan and 5-door hatchback, assembled at GM's facility in Rayong, Thailand in July 2012 as a 4-door sedan. Three trims were available, LS, LT and LTZ, in both the sedan and hatchback models (the LS would be available only with the 4-door sedan), and powered by the 1.4-liter engine with the option of 5-speed manual or 6-speed automatic transmission. Delivery of the 4-door sedan started in late of July 2012, and the hatchback followed in August 2012. The Thai-built Sonic was exported to other Southeast Asian countries like Philippines, Indonesia and Malaysia. Production ceased in 2015.

The model was unveiled in Japan at the Summer Sonic 2011 event in QVC Marine Field, and went on sale in November 2011. Early models included the 5-door hatchback with a 1.6-litre, 115 PS (85 kW) Ecotec engine, and a 6-speed automatic transmission with TAPshift. The base model is based on the equivalent of North American LTZ trim level, while the LT model includes alloy wheels and metallic paint.

The Sonic was also assembled at the GM Colmotores plant in Bogotá, Colombia, where it was initially introduced for the domestic market only and later also exported to countries in the Andean region. As of December 2012, production was also underway at the GAZ (Gorky Automobile Plant) plant in Nizhny Novgorod, Russia, but during 2015, the contract was discontinued.

The Barina sold in Australia and New Zealand was sourced from South Korea and only available with the 1.6-liter Family 1 engine, with either a 5-speed manual or conventional 4- or 6-speed automatic.

=== Facelift ===
At the 2016 New York International Auto Show, Chevrolet revealed the refreshed North American version of the Sonic hatchback and sedan. The facelift brought a restyled front fascia, new LED tail lights and refreshed equipment. The Barina sold in Australia and New Zealand was available only with 6-speed conventional automatic, the 4-speed model being dropped, with the same 5-speed manual in the standard model.

The LTZ trim level was renamed Premier for the 2017 model year. The previous RS trim level became a standard appearance package for all Hatchback models (1LT and Premier), and included unique upholstery (cloth trim for the 1LT, and perforated leatherette trim for the Premier), red interior accents and stitching, unique 'RS' badging, and unique aluminum-alloy wheels (16" for LT and 17" for Premier). Since the refresh, the 1LS model was only available as a sedan.

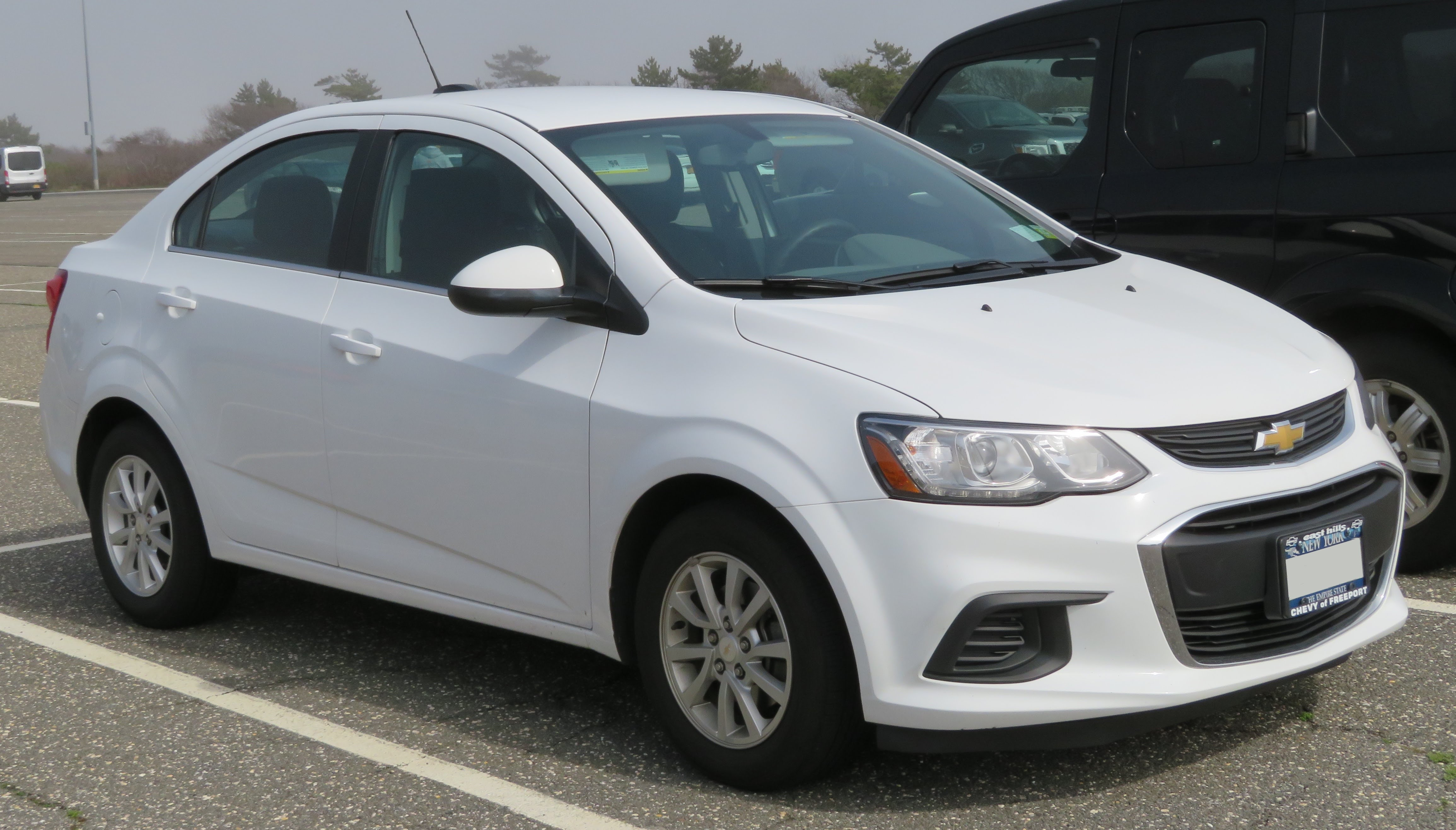
2017 Chevrolet Sonic Sedan LT (facelift, US; front)

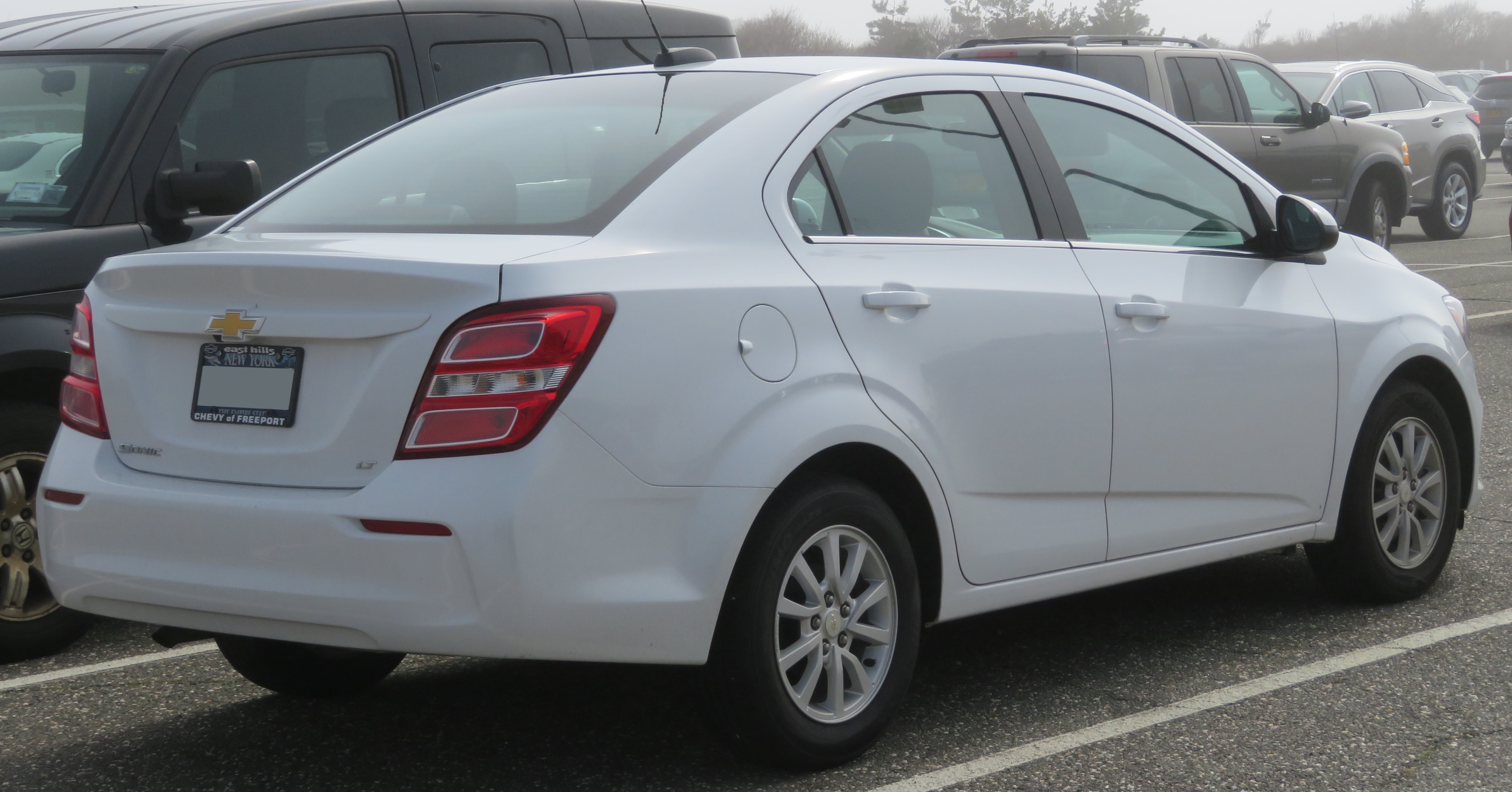
2017 Chevrolet Sonic Sedan LT (facelift, US; rear)

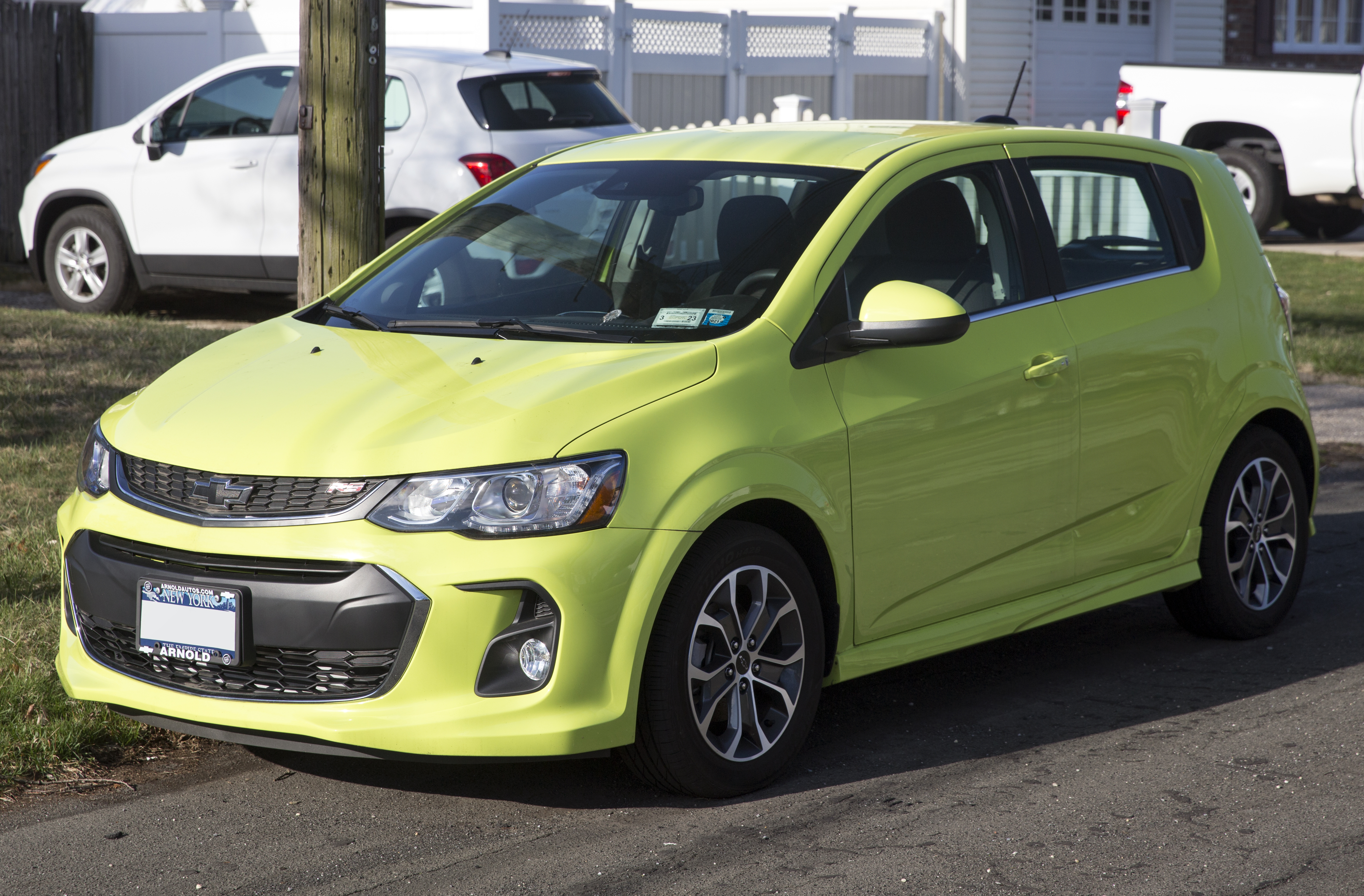
2019 Chevrolet Sonic Hatchback RS (facelift, US; front)

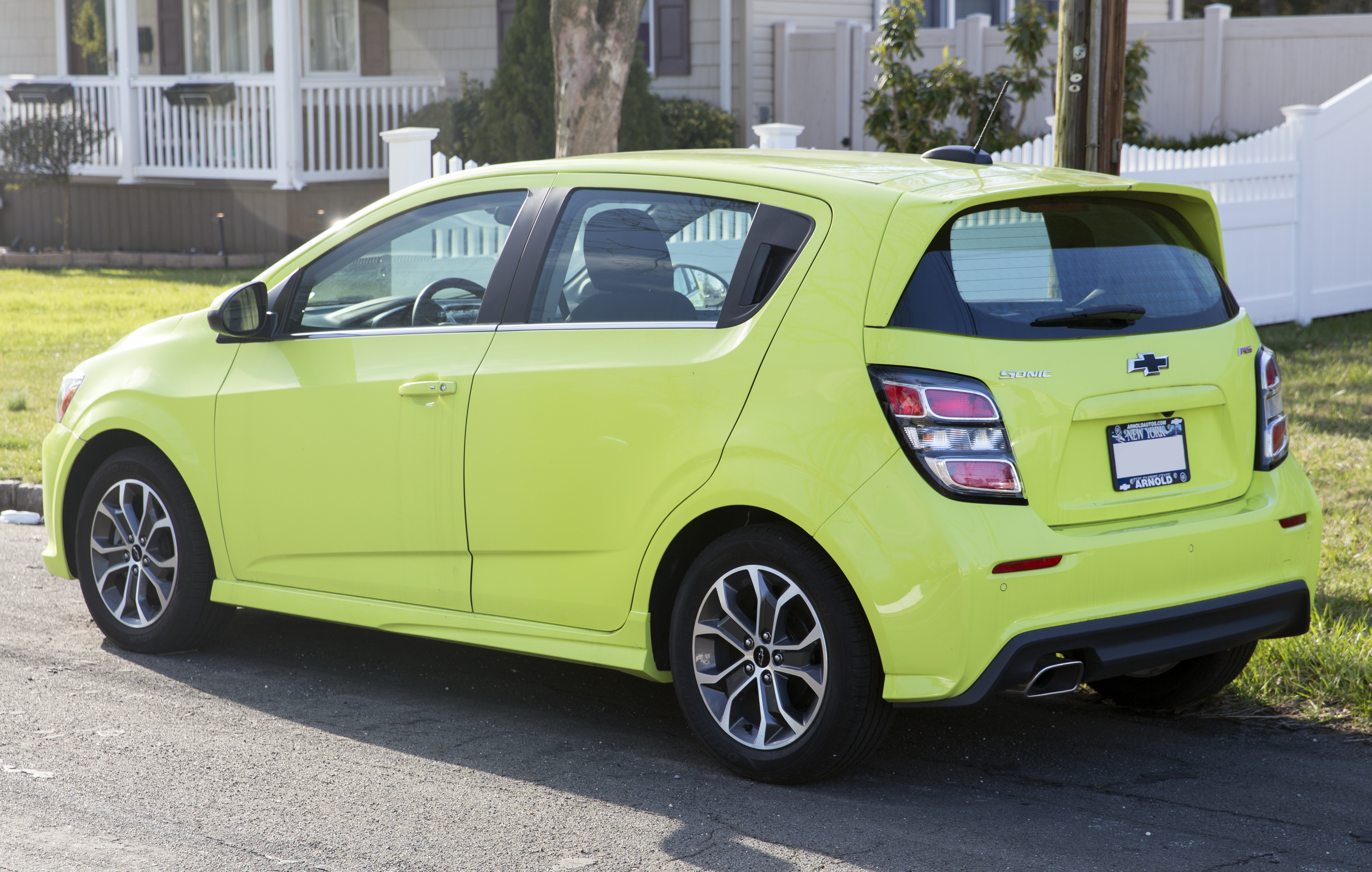
2019 Chevrolet Sonic Hatchback RS (facelift, US; rear)

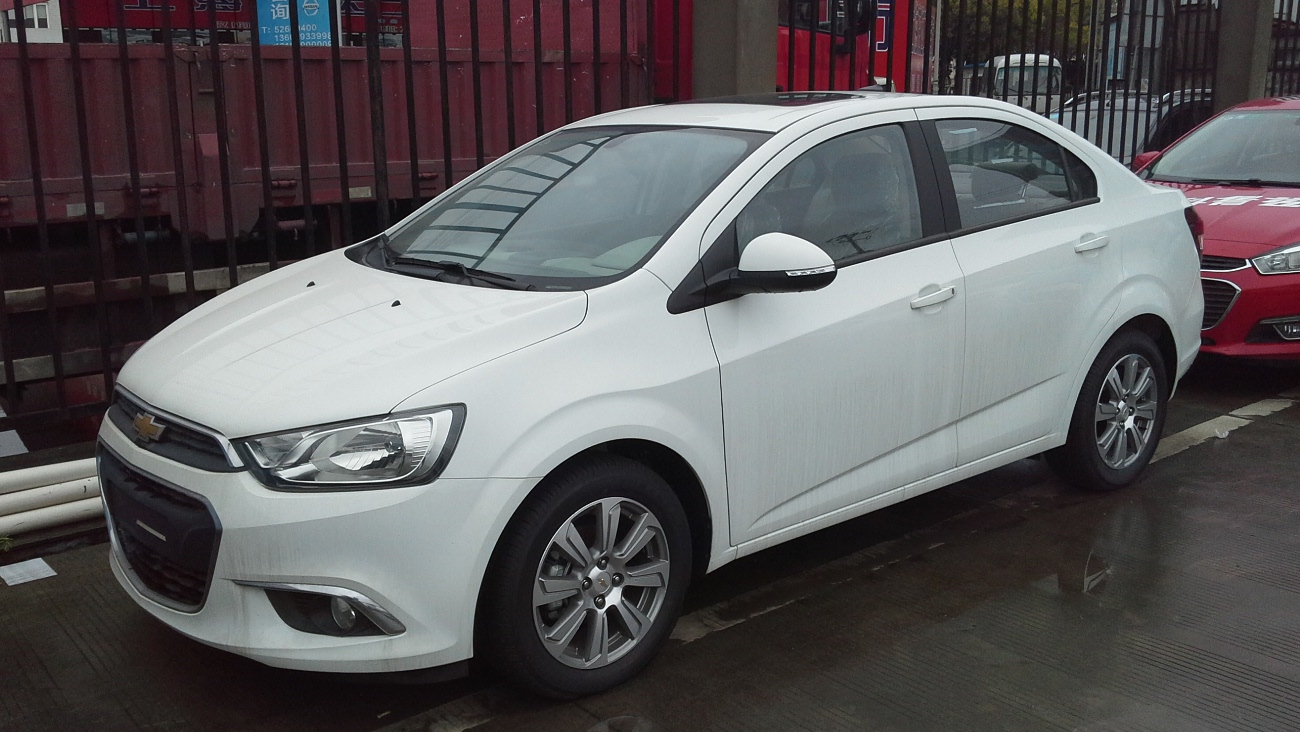
2015 Chevrolet Aveo Sedan (facelift, China; front)

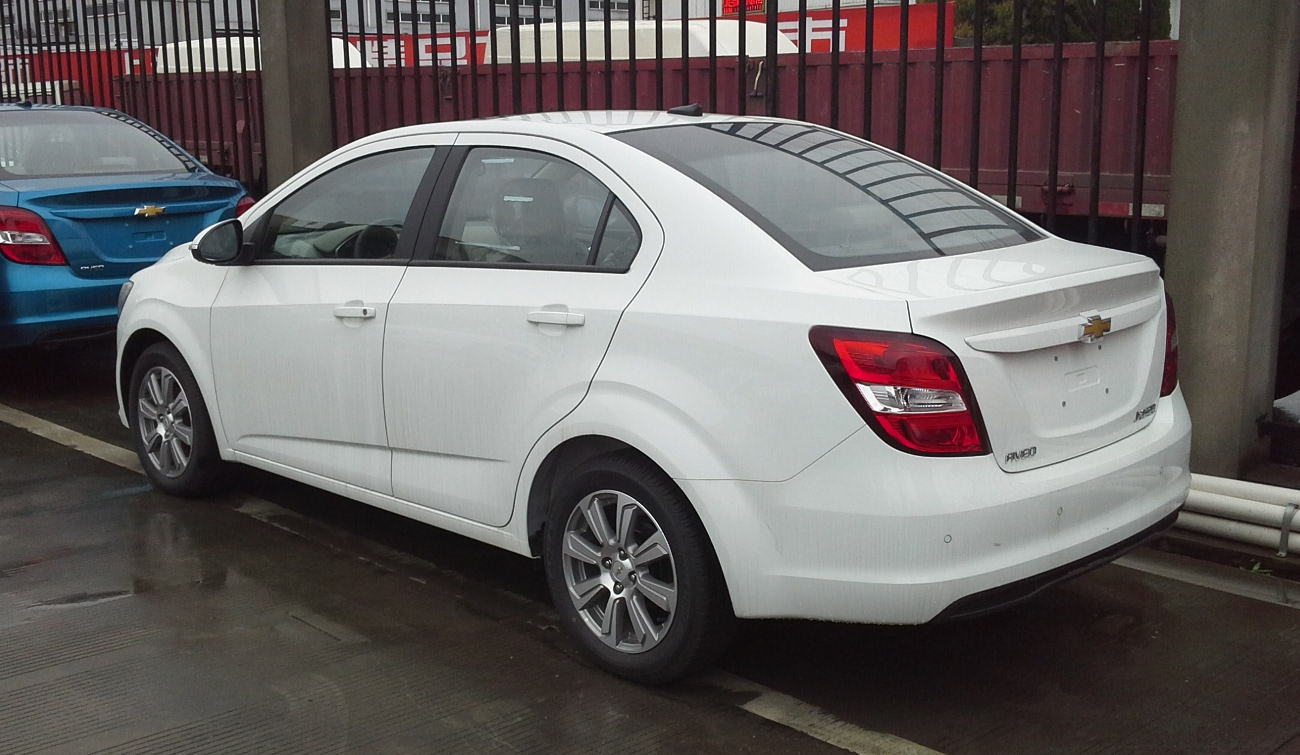
2015 Chevrolet Aveo Sedan (facelift, China; rear)

=== Powertrains ===
Gasoline
Engine	Power	Torque	Transmission	Years
1.2 L (1,229 cc) LDC/LWB Ecotec I4	51 kW (69 PS; 68 hp)	115 N⋅m (85 lb⋅ft)	5-speed manual	2011–
1.2 L (1,229 cc) LDC/LWB Ecotec I4	62 kW (84 PS; 83 hp)	115 N⋅m (85 lb⋅ft)	5-speed manual	2011–
1.4 L (1,398 cc) LDD Ecotec I4	74 kW (101 PS; 99 hp)	130 N⋅m (96 lb⋅ft)	5-speed manual; 6-speed GM 6T30 automatic	2011–
1.4 L (1,364 cc) LUV Ecotec I4 (t/c) (US Engine)	103 kW (140 PS; 138 hp)	201 N⋅m (148 lb⋅ft) (NA)	6-speed manual; 6-speed GM 6T40 automatic	2011–
1.6 L (1,598 cc) LDE Ecotec I4	85 kW (116 PS; 114 hp)	155 N⋅m (114 lb⋅ft)	5-speed manual; 6-speed GM 6T30 automatic	2011–
1.8 L (1,796 cc) LUW Ecotec I4 (US Engine)	103 kW; 140 PS (138 hp) (NA)	169 N⋅m (125 lb⋅ft) (NA)	5-speed manual; 6-speed GM 6T30 automatic	2011–2018
Diesel
1.3 L (1248 cc) CDTI LDV/LSF I4 (t/c)	55 kW (75 PS; 74 hp)	190 N⋅m (140 lb⋅ft)	5-speed manual	2011–
1.3 L (1248 cc) CDTI LDV/LSF I4 (t/c)	70 kW (95 PS; 94 hp)	210 N⋅m (155 lb⋅ft)	6-speed manual	2011–

=== Safety ===
The Aveo in its most basic Latin American market configuration with no airbags and no ABS received 0 stars for adult occupants and 2 stars for toddlers from Latin NCAP 1.0 in 2015.

Latin NCAP 1.5 test results Chevrolet Aveo - NO Airbags (2015, similar to Euro NCAP 2002)
Test	Points	Stars
Adult occupant:	0/17.0	0 /5 stars
Child occupant:	17.93/49.00	2 /5 stars

The Aveo in its most basic Latin American market configuration with 2 airbags and no ESC received 0 stars for adult occupants and 3 stars for toddlers from Latin NCAP 2.0 in 2017.

Latin NCAP 1.5 test results Chevrolet Aveo + 2 Airbags (2015, similar to Euro NCAP 2002)
Test	Points	Stars
Adult occupant:	17.49/17.0	0 /5 stars
Child occupant:	30.11/49.00	3 /5 stars

NHTSA (US)		Euro NCAP (2011)		IIHS (US)(after Feb. 2015)	
Overall	5/5 stars	Overall	5/5 stars	Small overlap front, driver side	Good
Frontal, driver	5/5 stars	Adult occupant	34.4 pts / 95%	Small overlap front, passenger side	Good
Frontal, passenger	5/5 stars	Child occupant	42.5 Pts / 87%	Moderate overlap front	Good
Side, driver	5/5 stars	Pedestrian	19.3 Pts / 54%	Side	Good
Side, passenger	5/5 stars	Driver assist	6.5 Pts / 93%	Roof strength	Good
Side pole, driver	5/5 stars			Head restraints & seats	Good
Rollover	/ 12.60%			Child seat anchors	Marginal
				Front crash prevention	Basic

=== Marketing ===
In marketing the Sonic, GM had the car driven by skateboarder Rob Dyrdek in a full 360-degree rotation (referred to as a kickflip) off a ramp and over an oversized skateboard. In addition, GM produced a commercial for Super Bowl XLVI called "Stunt Anthem", which featured the kickflip, as well as other Sonics skydiving, doing a bungee jump, and scenes from OK Go's music video for the song "Needing/Getting." The song featured in the commercial is "We Are Young" by Fun.

=== Discontinuation ===
The Sonic was discontinued in Canada after the 2018 model year. In March 2019, the Aveo was discontinued in South Korea. Chevrolet discontinued the Sonic after the 2020 model year in the United States, due to GM's plans to convert the Orion Assembly to EV production and declining sales. There are no plans for a successor. The Sonic ended production on October 20, 2020.

== Chevrolet Sail-based Aveo (2017) ==
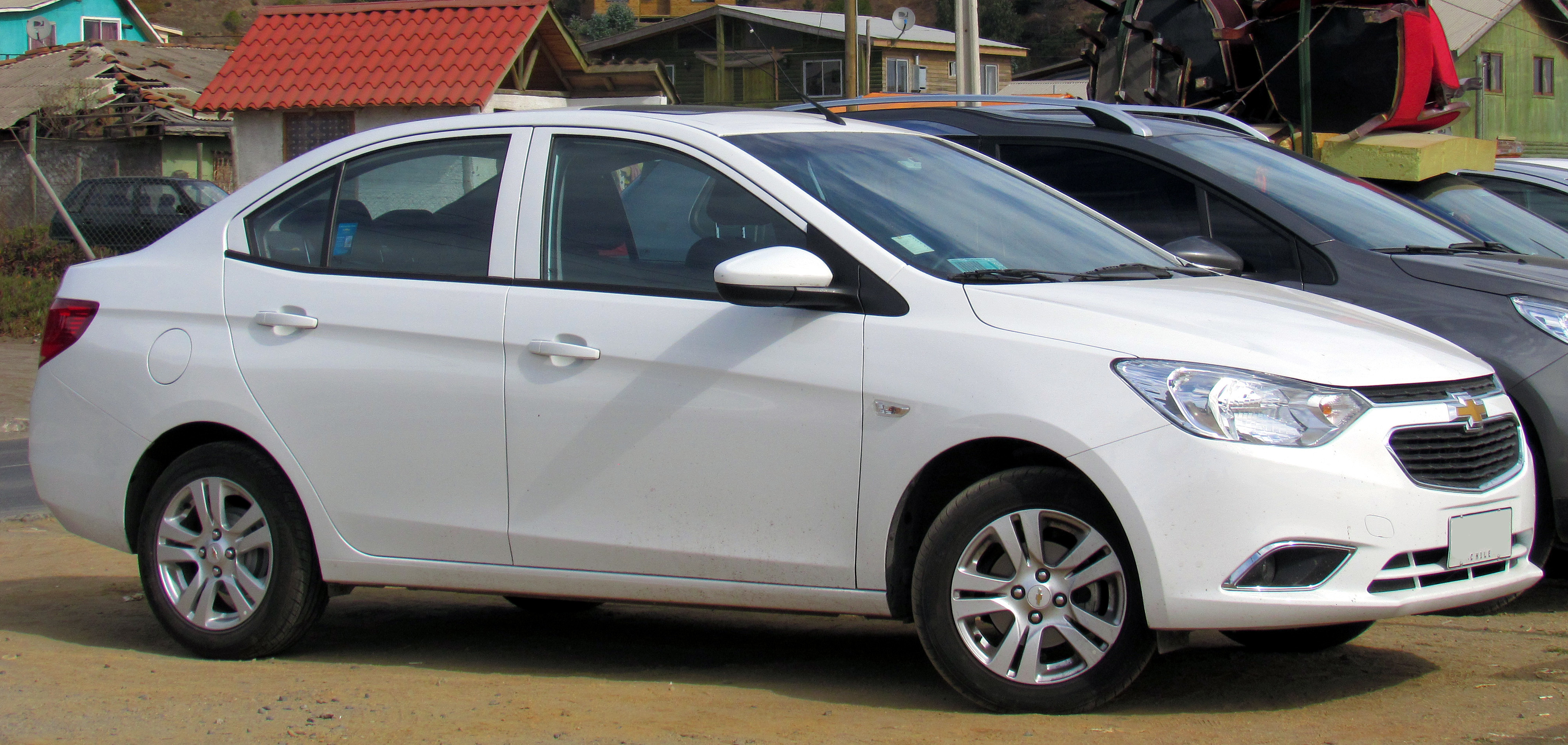
Chevrolet Aveo/Sail (2017–2023)

In several Central American countries, the Aveo nameplate is used for the third-generation Chevrolet Sail sedan, which went on sale in Mexico in November 2017 for the 2019 model year to replace the first-generation Aveo sedan. The Chinese-made Sail was renamed as to avoid being related to the second-generation Sail, which obtained zero star rating in Latin NCAP in 2015 in a variant without airbags. It was marketed alongside the Sonic as a more budget offering until the latter's discontinuation.

== Third generation (310C; 2023) ==
Third generation
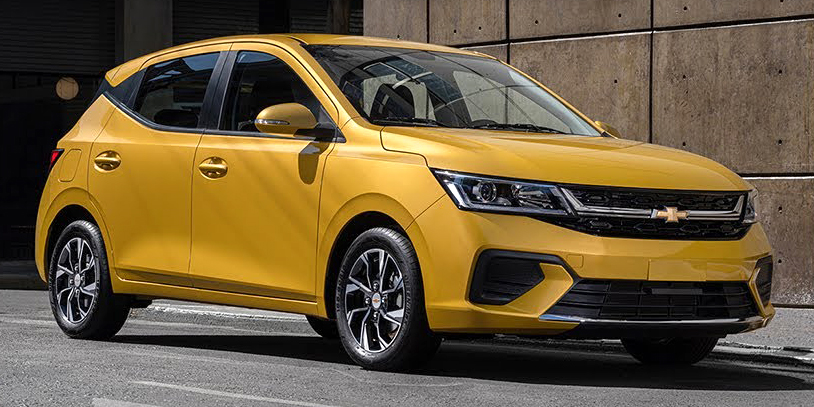

Overview
- Model code: 310C
- Also called: Chevrolet Sail (South America); Chevrolet Optra (Egypt)
- Production: 2023–present
- Assembly: China: Liuzhou, Guangxi (SGMW); Egypt: 6 October City (GM Egypt)

Body and chassis
- Body style: 5-door hatchback 4-door sedan
- Related: Wuling Xingchi/Alvez

Powertrain
- Engine: Gasoline: 1.5 L LAR I4
- Power output: 73 kW (98 hp; 99 PS)
- Transmission: 6-speed manual; CVT

Dimensions
- Wheelbase: 2,550 mm (100.4 in)
- Length: 4,170 mm (164.2 in) (hatchback); 4,490 mm (176.8 in) (sedan)
- Width: 1,695 mm (66.7 in)
- Height: 1,490 mm (58.7 in)

The new generation Aveo was introduced in December 2022 and launched in February 2023 for the Mexican market for the 2024 model year. Available as a 5-door hatchback and 4-door sedan, it is developed and produced by SAIC-GM-Wuling under the model code 310C.

=== Markets ===
In Mexico, sales of the Aveo hatchback started in April 2023. Sales of the Aveo sedan started in June. The Aveo and Groove started local production in 2026.

The model became available in Chile and other nearby countries since September 2023 as a 2024 model year as the Chevrolet Sail.

The Aveo was sold in Egypt as the Chevrolet Optra; replacing the Baojun 630 rebadged model that was sold under the Optra nameplate.

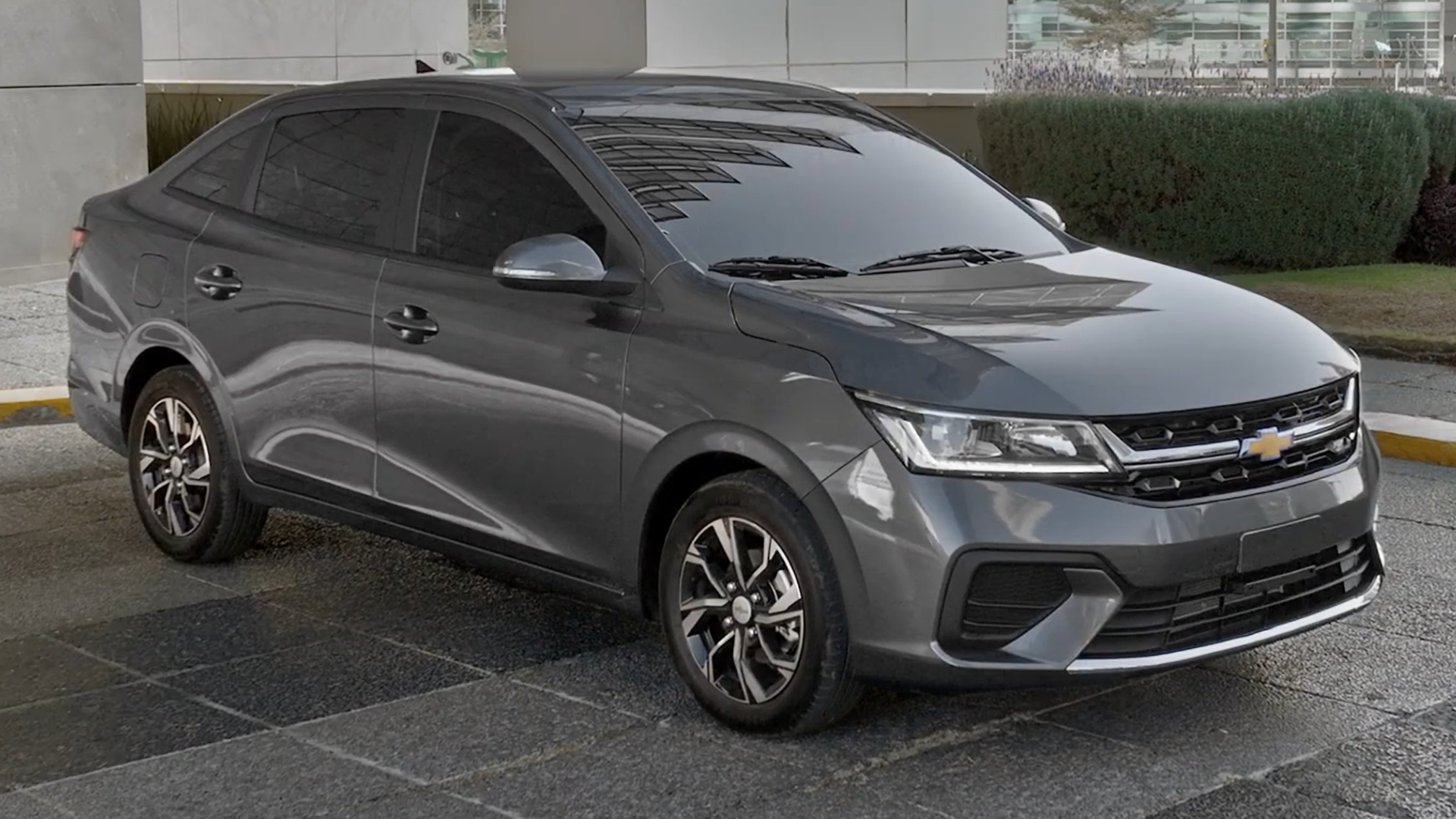
Sedan

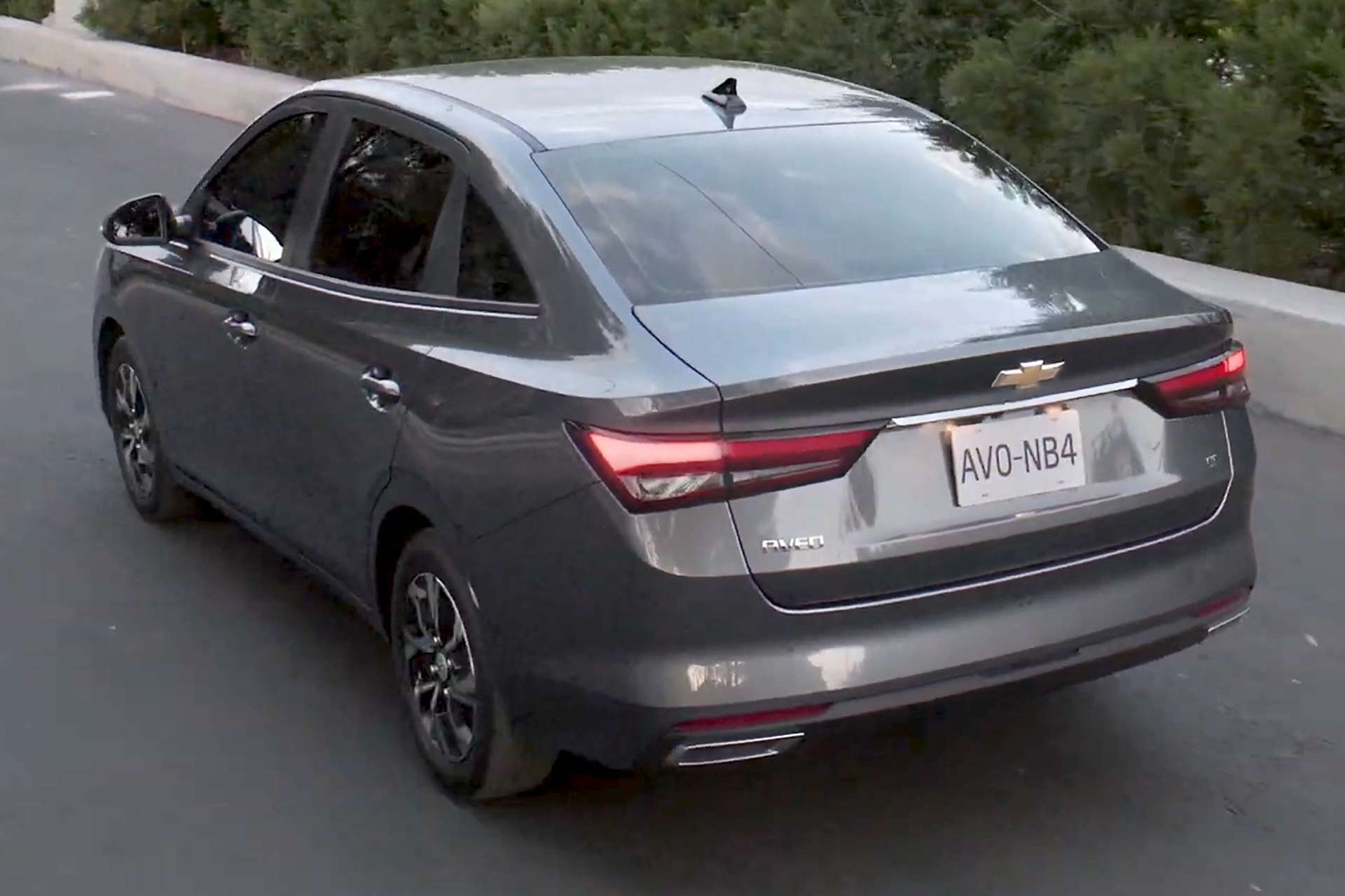
Rear view

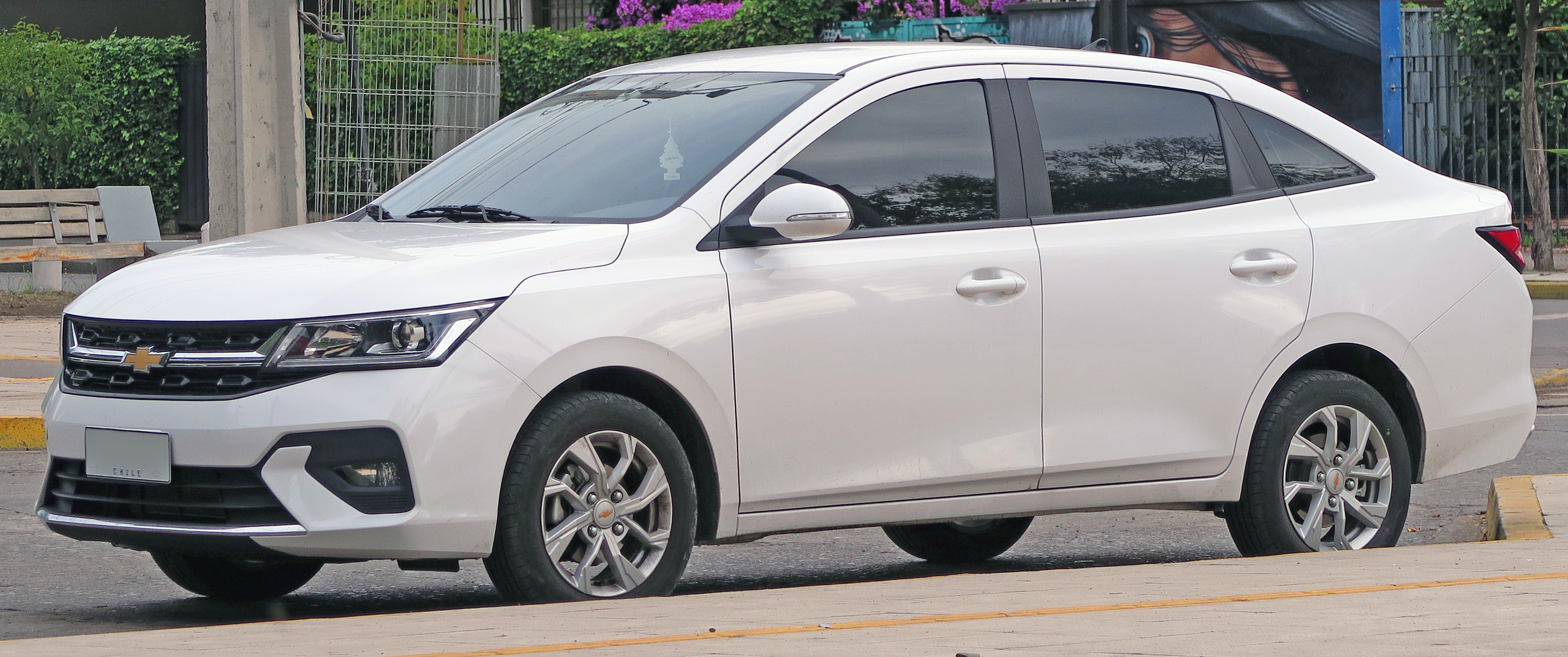
2026 Chevrolet Sail LTZ (Chile)

== Sales ==
Calendar year	United States			Mexico			Europe	China
Calendar year	Aveo	Pontiac G3	Sonic	Aveo	Pontiac G3	Sonic	Kalos/Aveo	Aveo
2002				-	-	-	5,337	
2003	5,677			-	-	-	49,024	
2004	56,642			-	-	-	70,024	
2005	68,085			-	-	-	70,235	13,935
2006	58,244			-	4,416	-	54,695	15,914
2007	67,028			-	7,520	-	44,993	11,455
2008	55,360			19,871	7,567	-	47,947	12,301
2009	38,516	6,223		24,206	3,011	-	66,329	9,532
2010	48,623	14		29,409	-	-	47,881	5,040
2011	28,601		15,778	36,972	-	6,664	48,704	29,869
2012	67		81,247	66,099	-	20,947	44,123	56,627
2013	2		85,646	65,331	-	20,331	22,686	35,509
2014			93,518	65,394	-	22,091	3,774	29,907
2015			64,775	76,696	-	29,606	140	5,943
2016			55,255	80,052	-	45,325	37	6
2017			30,290	65,772	-	22,874	3	
2018			20,613	82,035	-	877	2	
2019			13,971	70,947	-	8		
2020			13,007	31,219	-	3		
2021			1,581	37,039	-	-		
2022			12	30,850	-	-		
2023				52,254	-	-		
2024				58,503	-			
2025				61,066				
