= Adorableness (TV series) =

American comedy TV series

- Genre: Clip show; Comedy
- Presented by: James Davis; Alyson Hannigan; Ross Mathews; Dulcé Sloan
- Country of origin: United States
- Original language: English
- No. of seasons: 1
- No. of episodes: 10

Production
- Running time: 22 min.
- Production companies: Superjacket Productions; Gorilla Flicks; MTV Entertainment Studios

Original release
- Network: MTV
- Release: July 19 – July 23, 2021

Related
- Ridiculousness; Amazingness; Deliciousness; Messyness

Adorableness is an American comedy clip show that premiered on July 19, 2021. It is hosted by James Davis and co-hosted by Alyson Hannigan, Ross Mathews and Dulcé Sloan. The series is the third spin off of Ridiculousness.

== Episodes ==
No.	Title	Original release date	US viewers (millions)
1	"Cute Cursers"	July 19, 2021	N/A
2	"Quack Heads"	July 19, 2021	N/A
3	"Strange Pillows"	July 20, 2021	N/A
4	"Don't Call Me Cute"	July 20, 2021	N/A
5	"Kid Litters"	July 21, 2021	N/A
6	"Gram-Tastic"	July 21, 2021	N/A
7	"Mini Miracles"	July 22, 2021	N/A
8	"It's Been Too Long"	July 22, 2021	N/A
9	"Claw Daddies"	July 23, 2021	N/A
10	"I Love You, Man"	July 23, 2021	N/A
