= Deliciousness =

American comedy TV series

- Genre: Clip show; Comedy
- Presented by: Tiffani Thiessen; Angela Kinsey; Kel Mitchell; Tim Chantarangsu
- Country of origin: United States
- Original language: English
- No. of seasons: 3
- No. of episodes: 60

Production
- Running time: 22 min.
- Production companies: Superjacket Productions, Gorilla Flicks

Original release
- Network: MTV
- Release: December 14, 2020 – December 26, 2022

Related
- Ridiculousness; Amazingness; Adorableness; Messyness

Deliciousness is an American comedy clip show that premiered on December 14, 2020. It is hosted by Tiffani Thiessen and co-hosted by Angela Kinsey, Kel Mitchell and Tim Chantarangsu. The series is a spin off of Ridiculousness and showcases various food-themed videos from the Internet.

In February 2021, the series was renewed for a second season, and in December for a third.

== Episodes ==
=== Series overview ===
Season	Episodes	Originally released	
Season	Episodes	First released	Last released
1	10	December 14, 2020	December 18, 2020
2	30	March 22, 2021	June 25, 2021
3	20	August 15, 2022	December 26, 2022

=== Season 1 (2020) ===
No. overall	No. in season	Title	Original release date	U.S. viewers (millions)
1	1	"A Very Merry Deliciousness"	December 14, 2020	0.48
2	2	"A Very Merry Deliciousness II"	December 14, 2020	0.40
3	3	"A Very Merry Deliciousness III"	December 15, 2020	0.36
4	4	"A Very Merry Deliciousness IV"	December 15, 2020	0.38
5	5	"A Very Merry Deliciousness V"	December 16, 2020	0.26
6	6	"A Very Merry Deliciousness VI"	December 16, 2020	0.28
7	7	"A Very Merry Deliciousness VII"	December 17, 2020	0.40
8	8	"The Happiest Meals"	December 17, 2020	0.41
9	9	"A Very Merry Deliciousness VIII"	December 18, 2020	0.35
10	10	"The Power of Pizza"	December 18, 2020	0.34

=== Season 2 (2021) ===
No. overall	No. in season	Title	Original release date	U.S. viewers (millions)
11	1	"F'd Up Fusions"	March 22, 2021	0.23
12	2	"Crimes Against Pizza"	March 22, 2021	0.22
13	3	"Fruit Dogs"	March 23, 2021	0.24
14	4	"Hardest Job in America"	March 23, 2021	0.17
15	5	"Hanger Issues"	March 24, 2021	0.21
16	6	"Too Late to Drive Thru"	March 24, 2021	0.22
17	7	"First Tastes"	March 25, 2021	0.18
18	8	"Bird Boys"	March 25, 2021	0.22
19	9	"No Time for Tables"	March 26, 2021	0.21
20	10	"Will a Dog Eat It?"	March 26, 2021	0.25
21	11	"Better with Bacon"	April 26, 2021	0.20
22	12	"Needing the Dough"	April 26, 2021	0.20
23	13	"Dish Duty"	April 27, 2021	0.22
24	14	"All-Night Diners"	April 27, 2021	0.20
25	15	"Xtra Crispy"	April 28, 2021	0.19
26	16	"Flam Baes"	April 28, 2021	0.15
27	17	"Pancake Princes"	April 29, 2021	0.14
28	18	"Pasta Powered"	April 29, 2021	0.14
29	19	"Stove's Broke"	April 30, 2021	0.15
30	20	"Kitchen Breakdowns"	April 30, 2021	0.18
31	21	"Delivery Systems"	June 21, 2021	0.18
32	22	"Dumpster Diners"	June 21, 2021	0.14
33	23	"Love at First Bite"	June 22, 2021	0.12
34	24	"Treat Heists"	June 22, 2021	0.17
35	25	"Questionable Prep"	June 23, 2021	0.16
36	26	"Eat Freaks"	June 23, 2021	0.14
37	27	"Furry Food Buddies"	June 24, 2021	0.20
38	28	"Campin' Cuisine"	June 24, 2021	0.20
39	29	"Gettin' Fried"	June 25, 2021	0.20
40	30	"P.B. & Cray"	June 25, 2021	0.21

=== Season 3 (2022) ===
No. overall	No. in season	Title	Original release date	U.S. viewers (millions)
41	1	"Be-Tray-Al"	August 15, 2022	0.18
42	2	"Onion Eyes"	August 15, 2022	0.16
43	3	"Don't Shop Hungry"	August 16, 2022	0.12
44	4	"I Was Gonna Eat That"	August 16, 2022	0.14
45	5	"Slopsticks"	August 17, 2022	0.18
46	6	"Five Second Rule"	August 17, 2022	0.18
47	7	"Taste Buds"	August 18, 2022	0.08
48	8	"Little Kitchen Nightmares"	August 18, 2022	0.09
49	9	"Food Pioneers"	August 19, 2022	0.15
50	10	"Super Stocked"	August 19, 2022	0.13
51	11	"Savin' the Cake"	December 5, 2022	0.11
52	12	"Delicious Indignance"	December 5, 2022	0.09
53	13	"No Slice for You"	December 5, 2022	0.08
54	14	"Job Well Done"	December 12, 2022	0.15
55	15	"Snack Attacked"	December 12, 2022	0.12
56	16	"Happy Blendings"	December 12, 2022	0.12
57	17	"Yolks On You"	December 19, 2022	0.14
58	18	"Rejected Foods"	December 19, 2022	0.13
59	19	"S'more Love"	December 26, 2022	0.18
60	20	"Seriously Saucy"	December 26, 2022	0.18

== Broadcast ==
The series premiered on December 14, 2020. The series aired for a brief time on Viacom owned networks, including Comedy Central, Pop, CMT and MTV2. The series aired from 7:00 to 7:30 PM (EST) on MTV.
