= Michael A. Simon =

American television and film director and writer

Michael Alan Simon
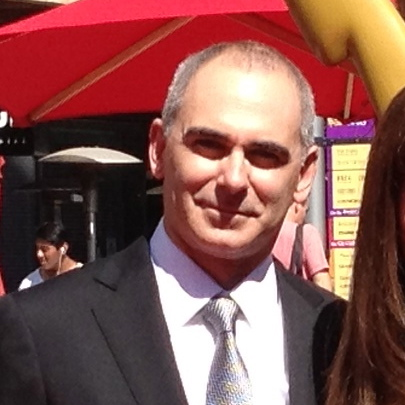
- Born: Michael Alan Simon; December 17, 1960 (age 65); NY, NY
- Occupations: Director, writer, producer
- Years active: 1986 to present
- Spouse: Debra Simon
- Awards: Emmy Awards, ACE Awards
- Website: www.michaelasimon.com

Michael A. Simon (born December 17, 1960) is an American television and film director, writer, and producer best known for his work on VH1 Storytellers, New Visions, and Ridiculousness.

== Career ==
Michael A. Simon was born in Queens NYC. He ran the campus radio station (WRGW; a classic college punk/alternative station) as a college student at George Washington University, which was his introduction into the entertainment field. Upon graduating Simon headed to TV News, and landed a job with ABC News in their DC bureau. Simon worked at ABC News during that election year of and also worked for ABC Sports including Monday Night Football.

After ABC, Simon moved back to his hometown of NYC and worked in a variety of positions in the Production Assistant world and at NBC Sports on NFL coverage. The next change would be pivotal in Simon's career as he got a job with VH1 in its early days. From his position inside VH1 Simon would first Produce and Direct the award-winning music series New Visions. New Visions featured a vast variety of musicians in-studio performances and interviews across five genres; Jazz, Rock, Folk, WorldBeat, and Soul. Some of the artists who appeared in the four-year run were: Miles Davis, Dizzy Gillespie, Joan Baez, Chris Issac, Sinead O'Connor, Lou Reed, Joe Cocker.

Continuing at VH1 for a full decade Simon moved into Directing major live music specials and award shows. He created, wrote, produced and directed the iconic VH1 Storytellers which featured artists telling intimate stories and then performing them before a small audience, originally shot on Film Simon the first 53 episodes, from Johnny Cash to David Bowie, to Elton John to Garth Brooks.

Simon left VH1 in 1998 and has worked on over 25 series and specials including; 22 Live Survivor Finales, A Home for the Holidays, America's Best Dance Crew, The Sing-Off and the worldwide sensation Ridiculousness which is now at 1800+ episodes. He has continued his work, directing programs primarily in music and dance, including broadcast concerts and Reality TV competitions, such as The Sing-Off, Fake off, and Randy Jackson Presents America's Best Dance Crew.

In 2000, he established Give and Go, Inc., an entertainment production company where he currently is developing multiple feature films, documentary series, and animations. He is a multiple EMMY award nominated/winning director, as well as a recipient of multiple ACE awards. He is a long time member of the Directors Guild of America, the Negotiating Committee of the DGA and the Academy of Television Arts and Sciences.

Currently has many scripted and non-scripted projects in various forms of development. He started Fstreet Productions in 2023 and to date have entered the podcast and youtube spaces with much success.

== Personal life ==
Michael was born in NYC and raised in Great Neck, NY. He attended George Washington University in Washington D.C. He currently resides in Los Angeles with his wife Debra.

== Awards and nominations ==
EMMYs

- Nomination for Live Survivor Finale: “Best Non-Fiction”
- Award for Special Class Program: “A Home for the Holidays”

& Nomination for Best Daytime Game/Quiz Show: American Bible Challenge

ACE Awards

- Award for Best Music Series: “New Visions”
- Award for Best Music Series “VH1 to One”
- Nominations for "Center Stage", "Four on the Floor", "VH1 Presents", "VH1 Storytellers", "My Generation", "New Visions" (4), "Brian Eno Special"
