= List of Ridiculousness episodes (season 21–present) =

Ridiculousness is an American comedy clip show that began airing on August 29, 2011. It is hosted by Rob Dyrdek and co-hosted by Steelo Brim and Chanel West Coast. Some episodes feature a celebrity special guest. Ridiculousness shows various viral videos from the Internet, usually involving failed do-it-yourself attempts at stunts, to which Rob and his panelists add mock commentary. Although the format bears some similarity to viewer-submission driven shows such as America's Funniest Home Videos, Ridiculousness producers, as well as the show's network, MTV, do not accept viewer submissions because of the dangerous nature of the stunts being shown.

== Series overview ==
| Season | Episodes | Originally released | |
| Season | Episodes | First released | Last released |
|---|---|---|---|
| 1 | 16 | August 29, 2011 | December 19, 2011 |
| 2 | 20 | April 30, 2012 | November 5, 2012 |
| 3 | 20 | February 14, 2013 | September 19, 2013 |
| 4 | 21 | January 2, 2014 | April 3, 2014 |
| 5 | 18 | July 10, 2014 | October 30, 2014 |
| 6 | 32 | January 1, 2015 | June 25, 2015 |
| 7 | 30 | October 8, 2015 | June 30, 2016 |
| 8 | 30 | July 7, 2016 | September 27, 2016 |
| 9 | 30 | January 20, 2017 | June 22, 2017 |
| 10 | 30 | September 1, 2017 | January 26, 2018 |
| 11 | 41 | August 5, 2018 | October 12, 2018 |
| 12 | 43 | October 19, 2018 | February 13, 2019 |
| 13 | 41 | February 17, 2019 | May 10, 2019 |
| 14 | 42 | May 17, 2019 | September 6, 2019 |
| 15 | 39 | September 7, 2019 | December 29, 2019 |
| 16 | 43 | January 6, 2020 | March 11, 2020 |
| 17 | 41 | April 20, 2020 | September 14, 2020 |
| 18 | 43 | September 15, 2020 | November 19, 2020 |
| 19 | 42 | November 30, 2020 | January 28, 2021 |
| 20 | 42 | February 8, 2021 | April 18, 2021 |
| 21 | 42 | April 23, 2021 | July 18, 2021 |
| 22 | 42 | July 30, 2021 | October 1, 2021 |
| 23 | 58 | October 8, 2021 | January 7, 2022 |
| 24 | 28 | January 14, 2022 | March 11, 2022 |
| 25 | 42 | March 18, 2022 | May 18, 2022 |
| 26 | 39 | May 20, 2022 | June 22, 2022 |
| 27 | 31 | June 22, 2022 | August 10, 2022 |
| 28 | 37 | August 12, 2022 | October 7, 2022 |
| 29 | 58 | October 7, 2022 | January 16, 2023 |
| 30 | 43 | January 16, 2023 | March 29, 2023 |
| 31 | 8 | April 3, 2023 | April 12, 2023 |
| 32 | 22 | April 17, 2023 | May 8, 2023 |
| 33 | 85 | May 8, 2023 | July 7, 2023 |
| 34 | 24 | July 7, 2023 | July 24, 2023 |
| 35 | 68 | July 28, 2023 | September 25, 2023 |
| 36 | 31 | September 25, 2023 | October 30, 2023 |
| 37 | 33 | November 3, 2023 | December 22, 2023 |
| 38 | 51 | December 22, 2023 | April 14, 2024 |
| 39 | 4 | April 14, 2024 | April 21, 2024 |
| 40 | 20 | April 21, 2024 | May 26, 2024 |
| 41 | 12 | June 2, 2024 | June 16, 2024 |
| 42 | 62 | June 23, 2024 | August 7, 2024 |
| 43 | 119 | August 11, 2024 | May 21, 2025 |
| 44 | 48 | May 21, 2025 | July 18, 2025 |
| 45 | 44 | July 18, 2025 | October 12, 2025 |
| 46 | 27 | October 12, 2025 | November 6, 2025 |
| 47 | 27 | November 10, 2025 | November 20, 2025 |
| 48 | 59 | November 20, 2025 | December 18, 2025 |
| 49 | TBA | February 11, 2026 | TBA |

== Episodes ==
=== Season 21 (2021) ===
The season premiered on MTV on April 23, 2021, with two episodes: Chanel and Sterling CCCI and Chanel and Sterling CCCII and concluded on July 18, 2021 with 2 episodes: Chanel and Sterling CCCXXXI and Chanel and Sterling CCCXXXII.

| No. in series | No. in season | Guest | Original air date | U.S. viewers (millions) |
|---|---|---|---|---|
| 659 | 1 | Chanel and Sterling CCCI | April 23, 2021 | 0.38 |
| 660 | 2 | Chanel and Sterling CCCII | April 23, 2021 | 0.38 |
| 661 | 3 | Lauren Riihimaki | April 25, 2021 | 0.37 |
| 662 | 4 | Chanel and Sterling CCCIII | April 25, 2021 | 0.39 |
| 663 | 5 | Chanel and Sterling CCCIV | April 30, 2021 | 0.29 |
| 664 | 6 | Chanel and Sterling CCCV | April 30, 2021 | 0.32 |
| 665 | 7 | David Arquette II | May 2, 2021 | 0.45 |
| 666 | 8 | Chanel and Sterling CCCVI | May 2, 2021 | 0.44 |
| 667 | 9 | Chanel and Sterling CCCVII | May 9, 2021 | 0.45 |
| 668 | 10 | Chanel and Sterling CCCVIII | May 9, 2021 | 0.46 |
| 669 | 11 | Chanel and Sterling CCCIX | May 14, 2021 | 0.39 |
| 670 | 12 | Chanel and Sterling CCCX | May 14, 2021 | 0.41 |
| 671 | 13 | Iliza Shlesinger II | May 16, 2021 | 0.39 |
| 672 | 14 | Blac Chyna | May 16, 2021 | 0.34 |
| 673 | 15 | Kevin Dillon | May 23, 2021 | 0.34 |
| 674 | 16 | Chanel and Sterling CCCXI | May 23, 2021 | 0.36 |
| 675 | 17 | Chanel and Sterling CCCXII | May 28, 2021 | 0.31 |
| 676 | 18 | Chanel and Sterling CCCXIII | May 28, 2021 | 0.34 |
| 677 | 19 | Griffin Johnson | May 30, 2021 | 0.31 |
| 678 | 20 | Chanel and Sterling CCCXIV | May 30, 2021 | 0.34 |
| 679 | 21 | Chanel and Sterling CCCXV | June 4, 2021 | 0.43 |
| 680 | 22 | Chanel and Sterling CCCXVI | June 4, 2021 | 0.43 |
| 681 | 23 | Yungblud | June 6, 2021 | 0.30 |
| 682 | 24 | Chanel and Sterling CCCXVII | June 6, 2021 | 0.34 |
| 683 | 25 | Chanel and Sterling CCCXVIII | June 11, 2021 | 0.34 |
| 684 | 26 | Chanel and Sterling CCCXVIX | June 11, 2021 | 0.37 |
| 685 | 27 | Jxdn | June 13, 2021 | 0.35 |
| 686 | 28 | Chanel and Sterling CCCXX | June 13, 2021 | 0.39 |
| 687 | 29 | Chanel and Sterling CCCXXI | June 18, 2021 | 0.33 |
| 688 | 30 | Chanel and Sterling CCCXXII | June 18, 2021 | 0.31 |
| 689 | 31 | Mod Sun | June 20, 2021 | 0.30 |
| 690 | 32 | Chanel and Sterling CCCXXIII | June 20, 2021 | 0.34 |
| 691 | 33 | Chanel and Sterling CCCXXIV | June 25, 2021 | 0.25 |
| 692 | 34 | Chanel and Sterling CCCXXV | June 25, 2021 | 0.27 |
| 693 | 35 | Chanel and Sterling CCCXXVI | July 9, 2021 | 0.32 |
| 694 | 36 | Chanel and Sterling CCCXXVII | July 9, 2021 | 0.36 |
| 695 | 37 | Luke Bryan | July 11, 2021 | 0.33 |
| 696 | 38 | Chanel and Sterling CCCXXVIII | July 11, 2021 | 0.35 |
| 697 | 39 | Chanel and Sterling CCCXXIX | July 16, 2021 | 0.32 |
| 698 | 40 | Chanel and Sterling CCCXXX | July 16, 2021 | 0.36 |
| 699 | 41 | Chanel and Sterling CCCXXXI | July 18, 2021 | 0.29 |
| 700 | 42 | Chanel and Sterling CCCXXXII | July 18, 2021 | 0.31 |

=== Season 22 (2021) ===
The season premiered on MTV on July 30, 2021, with two episodes: Chanel and Sterling CCCXXXIII and Chanel and Sterling CCCXXXIV and concluded on October 1, 2021, with 4 episodes: Chanel and Sterling CCCLXIX, Chanel and Sterling CCCLXX, Chanel and Sterling CCCLXXI and Chanel and Sterling CCCLXXII.

| No. in series | No. in season | Guest | Original air date | U.S. viewers (millions) |
|---|---|---|---|---|
| 701 | 1 | Chanel and Sterling CCCXXXIII | July 30, 2021 | 0.36 |
| 702 | 2 | Chanel and Sterling CCCXXXIV | July 30, 2021 | 0.34 |
| 703 | 3 | Chanel and Sterling CCCXXXV | August 1, 2021 | 0.34 |
| 704 | 4 | Chanel and Sterling CCCXXXVI | August 1, 2021 | 0.32 |
| 705 | 5 | Chanel and Sterling CCCXXXVII | August 6, 2021 | 0.21 |
| 706 | 6 | Chanel and Sterling CCCXXXVIII | August 6, 2021 | 0.22 |
| 707 | 7 | Travis Mills II | August 8, 2021 | 0.31 |
| 708 | 8 | Chanel and Sterling CCCXXXIX | August 8, 2021 | 0.32 |
| 709 | 9 | Chanel and Sterling CCCXXXVIX | August 13, 2021 | 0.30 |
| 710 | 10 | Chanel and Sterling CCCXL | August 13, 2021 | 0.27 |
| 711 | 11 | Nate Bargatze | August 15, 2021 | 0.32 |
| 712 | 12 | Chanel and Sterling CCCXLI | August 15, 2021 | 0.33 |
| 713 | 13 | Chanel and Sterling CCCXLII | August 20, 2021 | 0.31 |
| 714 | 14 | Chanel and Sterling CCCXLIII | August 20, 2021 | 0.31 |
| 715 | 15 | Bretman Rock | August 22, 2021 | 0.43 |
| 716 | 16 | Chanel and Sterling CCCXLIII | August 22, 2021 | 0.41 |
| 717 | 17 | Chanel and Sterling CCCXLIV | August 27, 2021 | 0.32 |
| 718 | 18 | Chanel and Sterling CCCXLV | August 27, 2021 | 0.34 |
| 719 | 19 | Chanel and Sterling CCCXLVI | August 29, 2021 | 0.32 |
| 720 | 20 | Chanel and Sterling CCCXLVII | August 29, 2021 | 0.43 |
| 721 | 21 | Chanel and Sterling CCCXLVIII | September 3, 2021 | 0.28 |
| 722 | 22 | Chanel and Sterling CCCXLIX | September 3, 2021 | 0.25 |
| 723 | 23 | Chanel and Sterling CCCL | September 5, 2021 | 0.24 |
| 724 | 24 | Chanel and Sterling CCCLI | September 5, 2021 | 0.25 |
| 725 | 25 | Chanel and Sterling CCCLII | September 10, 2021 | 0.34 |
| 726 | 26 | Chanel and Sterling CCCLIII | September 10, 2021 | 0.36 |
| 727 | 27 | Chanel and Sterling CCCLIV | September 17, 2021 | 0.37 |
| 728 | 28 | Chanel and Sterling CCCLV | September 17, 2021 | 0.44 |
| 729 | 29 | Chanel and Sterling CCCLXV | September 17, 2021 | 0.36 |
| 730 | 30 | Chanel and Sterling CCCLXVI | September 17, 2021 | 0.33 |
| 731 | 31 | Chanel and Sterling CCCLVI | September 19, 2021 | 0.27 |
| 732 | 32 | Chanel and Sterling CCCLVII | September 19, 2021 | 0.30 |
| 733 | 33 | Chanel and Sterling CCCLVIII | September 24, 2021 | 0.21 |
| 734 | 34 | Chanel and Sterling CCCLIX | September 24, 2021 | 0.27 |
| 735 | 35 | Chanel and Sterling CCCLXVII | September 24, 2021 | 0.34 |
| 736 | 36 | Chanel and Sterling CCCLXVIII | September 24, 2021 | 0.35 |
| 737 | 37 | Chanel and Sterling CCCLX | September 26, 2021 | 0.18 |
| 738 | 38 | Chanel and Sterling CCCLXI | September 26, 2021 | 0.21 |
| 739 | 39 | Chanel and Sterling CCCLXIX | October 1, 2021 | 0.30 |
| 740 | 40 | Chanel and Sterling CCCLXX | October 1, 2021 | 0.29 |
| 741 | 41 | Chanel and Sterling CCCLXXI | October 1, 2021 | 0.28 |
| 742 | 42 | Chanel and Sterling CCCLXXII | October 1, 2021 | 0.32 |

=== Season 23 (2021–22) ===
The season premiered on MTV on October 8, 2021, with four episodes: Chanel and Sterling CCCLXXIII, Chanel and Sterling CCCLXXIV, Halloween I and Chanel and Sterling CCCLXXV and concluded on January 7, 2022, with 4 episodes: DDG, Chanel and Sterling CDXI, Chanel and Sterling CDXII and Chanel and Sterling CDXIII.

| No. in series | No. in season | Guest | Original air date | U.S. viewers (millions) |
|---|---|---|---|---|
| 743 | 1 | Chanel and Sterling CCCLXXIII | October 8, 2021 | 0.25 |
| 744 | 2 | Chanel and Sterling CCCLXXIV | October 8, 2021 | 0.25 |
| 745 | 3 | Halloween I | October 8, 2021 | 0.30 |
| 746 | 4 | Chanel and Sterling CCCLXXV | October 8, 2021 | 0.31 |
| 747 | 5 | Chanel and Sterling CCCLXXVI | October 15, 2021 | 0.27 |
| 748 | 6 | Chanel and Sterling CCCLXXVII | October 15, 2021 | 0.31 |
| 749 | 7 | Halloween II | October 15, 2021 | 0.37 |
| 750 | 8 | Halloween III | October 15, 2021 | 0.42 |
| 751 | 9 | Halloween IV | October 22, 2021 | 0.36 |
| 752 | 10 | Halloween V | October 22, 2021 | 0.31 |
| 753 | 11 | Chanel and Sterling CCCLXXVIII | October 22, 2021 | 0.29 |
| 754 | 12 | Chanel and Sterling CCCLXXIX | October 22, 2021 | 0.32 |
| 755 | 13 | Halloween VI | October 29, 2021 | 0.33 |
| 756 | 14 | Chanel and Sterling CCCLXXX | October 29, 2021 | 0.32 |
| 757 | 15 | Chanel and Sterling CCCLXXXI | October 29, 2021 | 0.30 |
| 758 | 16 | Chanel and Sterling CCCLXXXII | October 29, 2021 | 0.31 |
| 759 | 17 | Greg Yuna | November 5, 2021 | 0.35 |
| 760 | 18 | Chanel and Sterling CCCLXXXIII | November 5, 2021 | 0.37 |
| 761 | 19 | Chanel and Sterling CCCLXXXIV | November 5, 2021 | 0.32 |
| 762 | 20 | Chanel and Sterling CCCLXXXV | November 5, 2021 | 0.28 |
| 763 | 21 | Chanel and Sterling CCCLXXXVI | November 12, 2021 | 0.32 |
| 764 | 22 | Chanel and Sterling CCCLXXXVII | November 12, 2021 | 0.27 |
| 765 | 23 | Chanel and Sterling CCCLXXXVIII | November 12, 2021 | 0.29 |
| 766 | 24 | Chanel and Sterling CCCLXXXIX | November 12, 2021 | 0.28 |
| 767 | 25 | Thanksgiving I | November 19, 2021 | 0.32 |
| 768 | 26 | Thanksgiving II | November 19, 2021 | 0.36 |
| 769 | 27 | Chanel and Sterling CCCXCII | November 19, 2021 | 0.29 |
| 770 | 28 | Chanel and Sterling CCCXCIII | November 19, 2021 | 0.37 |
| 771 | 29 | Ed "Big Ed" Brown | November 26, 2021 | 0.33 |
| 772 | 30 | Chanel and Sterling CCCXCV | November 26, 2021 | 0.35 |
| 773 | 31 | Chanel and Sterling CCCXCVI | November 26, 2021 | 0.39 |
| 774 | 32 | Chanel and Sterling CCCXCVII | November 26, 2021 | 0.37 |
| 775 | 33 | Holiday I | December 3, 2021 | 0.34 |
| 776 | 34 | Holiday II | December 3, 2021 | 0.35 |
| 777 | 35 | Chanel and Sterling CD | December 3, 2021 | 0.36 |
| 778 | 36 | Chanel and Sterling CDI | December 3, 2021 | 0.37 |
| 779 | 37 | Holiday III | December 10, 2021 | 0.38 |
| 780 | 38 | Holiday IV | December 10, 2021 | 0.39 |
| 781 | 39 | Chanel and Sterling CCCXC | December 10, 2021 | 0.37 |
| 782 | 40 | Chanel and Sterling CCCXCI | December 10, 2021 | 0.31 |
| 783 | 41 | Holiday V | December 17, 2021 | 0.40 |
| 784 | 42 | Holiday VI | December 17, 2021 | 0.44 |
| 785 | 43 | Chanel and Sterling CCCXCIV | December 17, 2021 | 0.38 |
| 786 | 44 | Chanel and Sterling CCCXCVIII | December 17, 2021 | 0.36 |
| 787 | 45 | Chanel and Sterling CCCXCIX | December 27, 2021 | 0.26 |
| 788 | 46 | Chanel and Sterling CDII | December 27, 2021 | 0.24 |
| 789 | 47 | Chanel and Sterling CDIII | December 28, 2021 | 0.23 |
| 790 | 48 | Chanel and Sterling CDIV | December 28, 2021 | 0.26 |
| 791 | 49 | Chanel and Sterling CDV | December 29, 2021 | 0.28 |
| 792 | 50 | Chanel and Sterling CDVI | December 29, 2021 | 0.32 |
| 793 | 51 | Chanel and Sterling CDVII | December 30, 2021 | 0.28 |
| 794 | 52 | Chanel and Sterling CDVIII | December 30, 2021 | 0.31 |
| 795 | 53 | Chanel and Sterling CDIX | December 31, 2021 | 0.26 |
| 796 | 54 | Chanel and Sterling CDX | December 31, 2021 | 0.30 |
| 797 | 55 | DDG | January 7, 2022 | 0.35 |
| 798 | 56 | Chanel and Sterling CDXI | January 7, 2022 | 0.34 |
| 799 | 57 | Chanel and Sterling CDXII | January 7, 2022 | 0.30 |
| 800 | 58 | Chanel and Sterling CDXIII | January 7, 2022 | 0.32 |

=== Season 24 (2022) ===
The season premiered on MTV on January 14, 2022, with three episodes: Chanel and Sterling CDXIV, Chanel and Sterling CDXV and Chanel and Sterling CDXVI and concluded on March 11, 2022, with 4 episodes: Chanel and Sterling CDXXXIX, Chanel and Sterling CDXL, Chanel and Sterling CDXLI and Chanel and Sterling CDXLII.

| No. in series | No. in season | Guest | Original air date | U.S. viewers (millions) |
|---|---|---|---|---|
| 801 | 1 | Chanel and Sterling CDXIV | January 14, 2022 | 0.39 |
| 802 | 2 | Chanel and Sterling CDXV | January 14, 2022 | 0.42 |
| 803 | 3 | Chanel and Sterling CDXVI | January 14, 2022 | 0.39 |
| 804 | 4 | Chanel and Sterling CDXVII | January 21, 2022 | 0.40 |
| 805 | 5 | Chanel and Sterling CDXVIII | January 21, 2022 | 0.40 |
| 806 | 6 | Chanel and Sterling CDXIX | January 21, 2022 | 0.40 |
| 807 | 7 | Johnny Knoxville II | January 28, 2022 | 0.48 |
| 808 | 8 | Steve-O III | January 28, 2022 | 0.41 |
| 809 | 9 | Rachel Wolfson | January 28, 2022 | 0.41 |
| 810 | 10 | Poopies | January 28, 2022 | 0.37 |
| 811 | 11 | Chanel and Sterling CDXX | February 4, 2022 | 0.29 |
| 812 | 12 | Chanel and Sterling CDXXI | February 4, 2022 | 0.29 |
| 813 | 13 | Chanel and Sterling CDXXII | February 11, 2022 | 0.36 |
| 814 | 14 | Chanel and Sterling CDXXIII | February 11, 2022 | 0.32 |
| 815 | 15 | Chanel and Sterling CDXXIV | February 11, 2022 | 0.37 |
| 816 | 16 | Chanel and Sterling CDXXV | February 18, 2022 | 0.31 |
| 817 | 17 | Chanel and Sterling CDXXVI | February 18, 2022 | 0.32 |
| 818 | 18 | Chanel and Sterling CDXXVIII | February 18, 2022 | 0.32 |
| 819 | 19 | Chanel and Sterling CDXXVIII | February 25, 2022 | 0.42 |
| 820 | 20 | Chanel and Sterling CDXXIX | February 25, 2022 | 0.40 |
| 821 | 21 | Chanel and Sterling CDXXX | February 25, 2022 | 0.39 |
| 822 | 22 | Chanel and Sterling CDXXXI | March 4, 2022 | 0.30 |
| 823 | 23 | Chanel and Sterling CDXXXII | March 4, 2022 | 0.31 |
| 824 | 24 | Chanel and Sterling CDXXXIII | March 4, 2022 | 0.26 |
| 825 | 25 | Chanel and Sterling CDXXXIX | March 11, 2022 | 0.37 |
| 826 | 26 | Chanel and Sterling CDXL | March 11, 2022 | 0.36 |
| 827 | 27 | Chanel and Sterling CDXLI | March 11, 2022 | 0.34 |
| 828 | 28 | Chanel and Sterling CDXLII | March 11, 2022 | 0.32 |

=== Season 25 (2022) ===
The season premiered on MTV on March 18, 2022 with four episodes: Chanel and Sterling CDXLIII, Chanel and Sterling CDXLIV, Chanel and Sterling CDXLV and Chanel and Sterling CDXLVI and concluded on May 18, 2022, with 2 episodes: Chanel and Sterling CDLV and Chanel and Sterling CDLXVII.

| No. in series | No. in season | Guest | Original air date | U.S. viewers (millions) |
|---|---|---|---|---|
| 829 | 1 | Chanel and Sterling CDXLIII | March 18, 2022 | 0.36 |
| 830 | 2 | Chanel and Sterling CDXLIV | March 18, 2022 | 0.40 |
| 831 | 3 | Chanel and Sterling CDXLV | March 18, 2022 | 0.44 |
| 832 | 4 | Chanel and Sterling CDXLVI | March 18, 2022 | 0.36 |
| 833 | 5 | Josh Richards | March 23, 2022 | 0.30 |
| 834 | 6 | Chanel and Sterling CDXXXIV | March 23, 2022 | 0.23 |
| 835 | 7 | Chanel and Sterling CDXLVII | March 23, 2022 | 0.26 |
| 836 | 8 | Chanel and Sterling CDXLVIII | March 23, 2022 | 0.23 |
| 837 | 9 | Ryan Williams | March 25, 2022 | 0.31 |
| 838 | 10 | Chanel and Sterling CDXXXV | March 25, 2022 | 0.38 |
| 839 | 11 | Chanel and Sterling CDXLIX | March 25, 2022 | 0.34 |
| 840 | 12 | Chanel and Sterling CDL | March 25, 2022 | 0.29 |
| 841 | 13 | Dean Vacca | March 30, 2022 | 0.26 |
| 842 | 14 | Chanel and Sterling CDXXXVI | March 30, 2022 | 0.27 |
| 843 | 15 | Haley Kalil | March 30, 2022 | 0.26 |
| 844 | 16 | Chanel and Sterling CDXXXVII | March 30, 2022 | 0.19 |
| 845 | 17 | Leon Thomas III | April 6, 2022 | 0.26 |
| 846 | 18 | Chanel and Sterling CDXXXVIII | April 6, 2022 | 0.25 |
| 847 | 19 | Chanel and Sterling CDLI | April 8, 2022 | 0.35 |
| 848 | 20 | Chanel and Sterling CDLII | April 8, 2022 | 0.28 |
| 849 | 21 | Chanel and Sterling CDLIII | April 13, 2022 | 0.25 |
| 850 | 22 | Chanel and Sterling CDLIV | April 13, 2022 | 0.25 |
| 851 | 23 | Chanel and Sterling CDLV | April 15, 2022 | 0.31 |
| 852 | 24 | Chanel and Sterling CDLVI | April 15, 2022 | 0.36 |
| 853 | 25 | Chanel and Sterling CDLVII | April 20, 2022 | 0.22 |
| 854 | 26 | Chanel and Sterling CDLVIII | April 20, 2022 | 0.23 |
| 855 | 27 | Chanel and Sterling CDLIX | April 22, 2022 | 0.30 |
| 856 | 28 | Chanel and Sterling CDLX | April 22, 2022 | 0.32 |
| 857 | 29 | Chanel and Sterling CDLXI | April 27, 2022 | 0.21 |
| 858 | 30 | Chanel and Sterling CDLXII | April 27, 2022 | 0.22 |
| 859 | 31 | Chanel and Sterling CDLXIII | April 29, 2022 | 0.42 |
| 860 | 32 | Chanel and Sterling CDLXIV | April 29, 2022 | 0.46 |
| 861 | 33 | Chanel and Sterling CDLXV | May 4, 2022 | 0.25 |
| 862 | 34 | Chanel and Sterling CDLXVI | May 4, 2022 | 0.26 |
| 863 | 35 | Jay Glazer | May 6, 2022 | 0.33 |
| 864 | 36 | Chanel and Sterling CDLXVIII | May 6, 2022 | 0.29 |
| 865 | 37 | Chanel and Sterling CDLXIX | May 11, 2022 | 0.34 |
| 866 | 38 | Chanel and Sterling CDLXX | May 11, 2022 | 0.34 |
| 867 | 39 | Chanel and Sterling CDLXXI | May 13, 2022 | 0.34 |
| 868 | 40 | Chanel and Sterling CDLXXII | May 13, 2022 | 0.29 |
| 869 | 41 | Chanel and Sterling CDLV | May 18, 2022 | 0.31 |
| 870 | 42 | Chanel and Sterling CDLXVII | May 18, 2022 | 0.27 |

=== Season 26 (2022) ===
The season premiered on MTV on May 20, 2022, with four episodes: Chanel and Sterling CDLXXIII, Chanel and Sterling CDLXXIV, Chanel and Sterling CDLXXV and Chanel and Sterling CDLXXVI and ended on June 22, 2022, with 3 episodes: Chanel and Sterling DIX, Chanel and Sterling DX and Chanel and Sterling DXI.

| No. in series | No. in season | Guest | Original air date | U.S. viewers (millions) |
|---|---|---|---|---|
| 871 | 1 | Chanel and Sterling CDLXXIII | May 20, 2022 | 0.28 |
| 872 | 2 | Chanel and Sterling CDLXXIV | May 20, 2022 | 0.31 |
| 873 | 3 | Chanel and Sterling CDLXXV | May 20, 2022 | 0.30 |
| 874 | 4 | Chanel and Sterling CDLXXVI | May 20, 2022 | 0.26 |
| 875 | 5 | Chanel and Sterling CDLXXVII | May 25, 2022 | 0.33 |
| 876 | 6 | Chanel and Sterling CDLXXVIII | May 25, 2022 | 0.29 |
| 877 | 7 | Chanel and Sterling CDLXXIX | May 25, 2022 | 0.24 |
| 878 | 8 | Chanel and Sterling CDLXXX | May 25, 2022 | 0.24 |
| 879 | 9 | Chanel and Sterling CDLXXXI | May 27, 2022 | 0.32 |
| 880 | 10 | Chanel and Sterling CDLXXXII | May 27, 2022 | 0.29 |
| 881 | 11 | Chanel and Sterling CDLXXXIII | May 27, 2022 | 0.33 |
| 882 | 12 | Chanel and Sterling CDLXXXIV | May 27, 2022 | 0.34 |
| 883 | 13 | Chanel and Sterling CDLXXXV | June 1, 2022 | 0.32 |
| 884 | 14 | Chanel and Sterling CDLXXXVI | June 1, 2022 | 0.36 |
| 885 | 15 | Chanel and Sterling CDLXXXVII | June 1, 2022 | 0.35 |
| 886 | 16 | Chanel and Sterling CDLXXXVIII | June 1, 2022 | 0.29 |
| 887 | 17 | Chanel and Sterling CDLXXXIX | June 3, 2022 | 0.30 |
| 888 | 18 | Chanel and Sterling CDXC | June 3, 2022 | 0.34 |
| 889 | 19 | Chanel and Sterling CDXCI | June 3, 2022 | 0.35 |
| 890 | 20 | Chanel and Sterling CDXCII | June 3, 2022 | 0.33 |
| 891 | 21 | Chanel and Sterling CDXCIII | June 8, 2022 | 0.28 |
| 892 | 22 | Chanel and Sterling CDXCIV | June 8, 2022 | 0.30 |
| 893 | 23 | Chanel and Sterling CDXCV | June 8, 2022 | 0.27 |
| 894 | 24 | Chanel and Sterling CDXCVI | June 8, 2022 | 0.26 |
| 895 | 25 | Chanel and Sterling CDXCVII | June 10, 2022 | 0.34 |
| 896 | 26 | Chanel and Sterling CDXCVIII | June 10, 2022 | 0.33 |
| 897 | 27 | Chanel and Sterling CDXCVIX | June 10, 2022 | 0.34 |
| 898 | 28 | Chanel and Sterling D | June 10, 2022 | 0.33 |
| 899 | 29 | Chanel and Sterling DI | June 15, 2022 | 0.30 |
| 900 | 30 | Chanel and Sterling DII | June 15, 2022 | 0.32 |
| 901 | 31 | Chanel and Sterling DII | June 15, 2022 | 0.34 |
| 902 | 32 | Chanel and Sterling DIV | June 15, 2022 | 0.32 |
| 903 | 33 | Chanel and Sterling DV | June 17, 2022 | N/A |
| 904 | 34 | Chanel and Sterling DVI | June 17, 2022 | 0.34 |
| 905 | 35 | Chanel and Sterling DVII | June 17, 2022 | 0.31 |
| 906 | 36 | Chanel and Sterling DVIII | June 17, 2022 | 0.36 |
| 907 | 37 | Chanel and Sterling DIX | June 22, 2022 | 0.27 |
| 908 | 38 | Chanel and Sterling DX | June 22, 2022 | 0.23 |
| 909 | 39 | Chanel and Sterling DXI | June 22, 2022 | 0.27 |

=== Season 27 (2022) ===
The season premiered on MTV on June 22, 2022, with one episode: Chanel and Sterling DXII and ended on August 10, 2022, with 2 episodes: Chanel and Sterling DXXXIX and Chanel and Sterling DXL.

| No. in series | No. in season | Guest | Original air date | U.S. viewers (millions) |
|---|---|---|---|---|
| 910 | 1 | Chanel and Sterling DXII | June 22, 2022 | 0.29 |
| 911 | 2 | Jimmie Allen | June 24, 2022 | 0.27 |
| 912 | 3 | Chanel and Sterling DXIII | June 24, 2022 | 0.26 |
| 913 | 4 | Chanel and Sterling DXIV | June 24, 2022 | 0.31 |
| 914 | 5 | Chanel and Sterling DXV | June 24, 2022 | 0.33 |
| 915 | 6 | Miles Chamley-Watson | June 29, 2022 | 0.33 |
| 916 | 7 | Chanel and Sterling DXVI | June 29, 2022 | 0.32 |
| 917 | 8 | Howie Mandel | July 1, 2022 | 0.37 |
| 918 | 9 | Chanel and Sterling DXVII | July 1, 2022 | 0.37 |
| 919 | 10 | Chanel and Sterling DXVIII | July 6, 2022 | 0.27 |
| 920 | 11 | Chanel and Sterling DXIX | July 6, 2022 | 0.26 |
| 921 | 12 | Chanel and Sterling DXX | July 8, 2022 | 0.34 |
| 922 | 13 | Chanel and Sterling DXXI | July 8, 2022 | 0.38 |
| 923 | 14 | Chanel and Sterling DXXII | July 13, 2022 | 0.28 |
| 924 | 15 | Chanel and Sterling DXXIII | July 13, 2022 | 0.31 |
| 925 | 16 | Chanel and Sterling DXXIV | July 15, 2022 | 0.33 |
| 926 | 17 | Chanel and Sterling DXXV | July 15, 2022 | 0.37 |
| 927 | 18 | Chanel and Sterling DXXVI | July 20, 2022 | 0.36 |
| 928 | 19 | Chanel and Sterling DXXVII | July 20, 2022 | 0.39 |
| 929 | 20 | Chanel and Sterling DXXVIII | July 22, 2022 | 0.38 |
| 930 | 21 | Chanel and Sterling DXXIX | July 22, 2022 | 0.36 |
| 931 | 22 | Chanel and Sterling DXXX | July 27, 2022 | 0.28 |
| 932 | 23 | Chanel and Sterling DXXXI | July 27, 2022 | 0.31 |
| 933 | 24 | Chanel and Sterling DXXXIII | July 29, 2022 | 0.29 |
| 934 | 25 | Chanel and Sterling DXXXIV | July 29, 2022 | 0.27 |
| 935 | 26 | Chanel and Sterling DXXXV | August 3, 2022 | 0.35 |
| 936 | 27 | Chanel and Sterling DXXXVI | August 3, 2022 | 0.40 |
| 937 | 28 | Chanel and Sterling DXXXVII | August 5, 2022 | 0.32 |
| 938 | 29 | Chanel and Sterling DXXXVIII | August 5, 2022 | 0.35 |
| 939 | 30 | Chanel and Sterling DXXXIX | August 10, 2022 | 0.29 |
| 940 | 31 | Chanel and Sterling DXL | August 10, 2022 | 0.31 |

=== Season 28 (2022) ===
The season premiered on MTV on August 12, 2022, with two episodes: Chanel and Sterling DXLII and Travie McCoy and ended on October 7, 2022, with guest Latto.

| No. in series | No. in season | Guest | Original air date | U.S. viewers (millions) |
|---|---|---|---|---|
| 941 | 1 | Chanel and Sterling DXLII | August 12, 2022 | 0.31 |
| 942 | 2 | Travie McCoy | August 12, 2022 | 0.29 |
| 943 | 3 | Chanel and Sterling DXLIII | August 17, 2022 | 0.28 |
| 944 | 4 | Chanel and Sterling DXLIV | August 17, 2022 | 0.29 |
| 945 | 5 | The Potash Twins | August 19, 2022 | 0.35 |
| 946 | 6 | Chanel and Sterling DXLVI | August 19, 2022 | 0.36 |
| 947 | 7 | Chanel and Sterling DXLVII | August 24, 2022 | 0.31 |
| 948 | 8 | Chanel and Sterling DXLVIII | August 24, 2022 | 0.28 |
| 949 | 9 | Chanel and Sterling DXLIX | August 26, 2022 | 0.28 |
| 950 | 10 | Chanel and Sterling DL | August 26, 2022 | 0.31 |
| 951 | 11 | Chanel and Sterling DXLI | August 31, 2022 | 0.28 |
| 952 | 12 | Chanel and Sterling DLI | August 31, 2022 | 0.33 |
| 953 | 13 | Chanel and Sterling DLII | September 2, 2022 | 0.19 |
| 954 | 14 | Chanel and Sterling DLIII | September 2, 2022 | 0.19 |
| 955 | 15 | Chanel and Sterling DLIV | September 7, 2022 | 0.22 |
| 956 | 16 | Chanel and Sterling DLV | September 7, 2022 | 0.19 |
| 957 | 17 | Julian Edelman | September 9, 2022 | 0.29 |
| 958 | 18 | Chanel and Sterling DXXXII | September 9, 2022 | 0.32 |
| 959 | 19 | Chanel and Sterling DLX | September 9, 2022 | 0.32 |
| 960 | 20 | Chanel and Sterling DLXI | September 9, 2022 | 0.32 |
| 961 | 21 | Chanel and Sterling DLVI | September 14, 2022 | 0.24 |
| 962 | 22 | Chanel and Sterling DLVII | September 14, 2022 | 0.26 |
| 963 | 23 | Chanel and Sterling DLXII | September 14, 2022 | 0.32 |
| 964 | 24 | Chanel and Sterling DLXIII | September 14, 2022 | 0.32 |
| 965 | 25 | Chanel and Sterling DLVIII | September 16, 2022 | 0.26 |
| 966 | 26 | Chanel and Sterling DLIX | September 16, 2022 | 0.24 |
| 967 | 27 | Chanel and Sterling DLXIV | September 16, 2022 | 0.25 |
| 968 | 28 | Chanel and Sterling DLXV | September 16, 2022 | 0.26 |
| 969 | 29 | Pauly Shore II | September 23, 2022 | 0.29 |
| 970 | 30 | Chanel and Sterling DXLV | September 23, 2022 | 0.30 |
| 971 | 31 | Chanel and Sterling DLX | September 23, 2022 | 0.30 |
| 972 | 32 | Chanel and Sterling DLXI | September 23, 2022 | 0.34 |
| 973 | 33 | Brendan Schaub VII | September 30, 2022 | 0.23 |
| 974 | 34 | Chanel and Sterling DLXIX | September 30, 2022 | 0.23 |
| 975 | 35 | Chanel and Sterling DLXX | September 30, 2022 | 0.22 |
| 976 | 36 | Chanel and Sterling DLXXI | September 30, 2022 | 0.24 |
| 977 | 37 | Latto | October 7, 2022 | 0.24 |

=== Season 29 (2022–23) ===
The season premiered on MTV on October 7, 2022, with three episodes: Chanel and Sterling DLXXIII, Chanel and Sterling DLXXIV and Chanel and Sterling DLXXV and ended on January 16, 2023, with one episode: Chanel and Sterling DCXXIV.

| No. in series | No. in season | Guest | Original air date | U.S. viewers (millions) |
|---|---|---|---|---|
| 978 | 1 | Chanel and Sterling DLXXIII | October 7, 2022 | 0.26 |
| 979 | 2 | Chanel and Sterling DLXXIV | October 7, 2022 | 0.27 |
| 980 | 3 | Chanel and Sterling DLXXV | October 7, 2022 | 0.26 |
| 981 | 4 | Chanel and Sterling DLXXVI | October 14, 2022 | 0.29 |
| 982 | 5 | Brendan Schaub VIII | October 14, 2022 | 0.30 |
| 983 | 6 | Chanel and Sterling DLXXVIII | October 14, 2022 | 0.31 |
| 984 | 7 | Chanel and Sterling DLXXIX | October 14, 2022 | 0.34 |
| 985 | 8 | Chanel and Sterling DLXXX | October 21, 2022 | 0.24 |
| 986 | 9 | Chanel and Sterling DLXXXI | October 21, 2022 | 0.23 |
| 987 | 10 | Chanel and Sterling DLXXXII | October 21, 2022 | 0.20 |
| 988 | 11 | Chanel and Sterling DLXXXIII | October 21, 2022 | 0.19 |
| 989 | 12 | Chanel and Sterling DLXXIII | October 28, 2022 | 0.16 |
| 990 | 13 | Chanel and Sterling DLXXVI | October 28, 2022 | 0.17 |
| 991 | 14 | Brendan Schaub IX | October 28, 2022 | 0.17 |
| 992 | 15 | Chanel and Sterling DLXXXIV | October 28, 2022 | 0.22 |
| 993 | 16 | Chanel and Sterling DLXXXV | November 4, 2022 | 0.31 |
| 994 | 17 | Chanel and Sterling DLXXXVII | November 4, 2022 | 0.31 |
| 995 | 18 | Chanel and Sterling DLXXXVIII | November 4, 2022 | 0.28 |
| 996 | 19 | Chanel and Sterling DLXXXIX | November 4, 2022 | 0.24 |
| 997 | 20 | Chanel and Sterling DLXVIII | November 11, 2022 | 0.27 |
| 998 | 21 | Chanel and Sterling DLXXII | November 11, 2022 | 0.28 |
| 999 | 22 | Chanel and Sterling DLXXVIIX | November 11, 2022 | 0.29 |
| 1000 | 23 | Chanel and Sterling DLXXXVI | November 11, 2022 | 0.28 |
| 1001 | 24 | Chanel and Sterling DXC | November 18, 2022 | 0.28 |
| 1002 | 25 | Chanel and Sterling DXCI | November 18, 2022 | 0.25 |
| 1003 | 26 | Chanel and Sterling DXCII | November 18, 2022 | 0.19 |
| 1004 | 27 | Chanel and Sterling DXCIII | November 18, 2022 | 0.21 |
| 1005 | 28 | Chanel and Sterling DXCIV | November 25, 2022 | 0.38 |
| 1006 | 29 | Chanel and Sterling DXCV | November 25, 2022 | 0.36 |
| 1007 | 30 | Chanel and Sterling DXCVI | November 25, 2022 | 0.30 |
| 1008 | 31 | Chanel and Sterling DXCVII | November 25, 2022 | 0.32 |
| 1009 | 32 | Chanel and Sterling DXCVIII | December 2, 2022 | 0.26 |
| 1010 | 33 | Chanel and Sterling DXCIX | December 2, 2022 | 0.23 |
| 1011 | 34 | Chanel and Sterling DC | December 2, 2022 | 0.21 |
| 1012 | 35 | Chanel and Sterling DCI | December 2, 2022 | 0.26 |
| 1013 | 36 | Chanel and Sterling DCII | December 9, 2022 | 0.29 |
| 1014 | 37 | Chanel and Sterling DCIII | December 9, 2022 | 0.28 |
| 1015 | 38 | Chanel and Sterling DCIV | December 9, 2022 | 0.26 |
| 1016 | 39 | Chanel and Sterling DCV | December 9, 2022 | 0.24 |
| 1017 | 40 | Chanel and Sterling DCX | December 12, 2022 | 0.25 |
| 1018 | 41 | Chanel and Sterling DCXI | December 12, 2022 | 0.24 |
| 1019 | 42 | Chanel and Sterling DCVI | December 16, 2022 | 0.31 |
| 1020 | 43 | Chanel and Sterling DCVII | December 16, 2022 | 0.35 |
| 1021 | 44 | Chanel and Sterling DCVIII | December 16, 2022 | 0.29 |
| 1022 | 45 | Chanel and Sterling DCIX | December 16, 2022 | 0.27 |
| 1023 | 46 | Chanel and Sterling DCXII | December 19, 2022 | 0.27 |
| 1024 | 47 | Chanel and Sterling DCXIII | December 19, 2022 | 0.21 |
| 1025 | 48 | Chanel and Sterling DCXVIII | December 26, 2022 | 0.24 |
| 1026 | 49 | Chanel and Sterling DCXIX | December 26, 2022 | 0.27 |
| 1027 | 50 | Chanel and Sterling DCXIV | January 2, 2023 | 0.28 |
| 1028 | 51 | Chanel and Sterling DCXV | January 2, 2023 | 0.27 |
| 1029 | 52 | Chanel and Sterling DCXVI | January 2, 2023 | 0.28 |
| 1030 | 53 | Chanel and Sterling DCXVII | January 2, 2023 | 0.31 |
| 1031 | 54 | Chanel and Sterling DCXX | January 9, 2023 | N/A |
| 1032 | 55 | Chanel and Sterling DCXXI | January 9, 2023 | N/A |
| 1033 | 56 | Chanel and Sterling DCXXII | January 9, 2023 | 0.27 |
| 1034 | 57 | Chanel and Sterling DCXXIII | January 9, 2023 | N/A |
| 1035 | 58 | Chanel and Sterling DCXXIV | January 16, 2023 | 0.20 |

=== Season 30 (2023) ===
The season premiered on MTV on January 16, 2023, with three episodes: Chanel and Sterling DCXXV, Chanel and Sterling DCXXVI and Chanel and Sterling DCXXVII and concluded on March 29, 2023, with two episodes: Chanel and Sterling DCLXV and Chanel and Sterling DCLXVI.

Note: This is the final season for Chanel West Coast, who had been co-presented the comedic clip show, alongside Steelo Brim and lead host Rob Dyrdek, since its launch in 2011.

| No. in series | No. in season | Guest | Original air date | U.S. viewers (millions) |
|---|---|---|---|---|
| 1036 | 1 | Chanel and Sterling DCXXV | January 16, 2023 | 0.18 |
| 1037 | 2 | Chanel and Sterling DCXXVI | January 16, 2023 | 0.19 |
| 1038 | 3 | Chanel and Sterling DCXXVII | January 16, 2023 | 0.20 |
| 1039 | 4 | Torey Pudwill | January 23, 2023 | 0.34 |
| 1040 | 5 | Chanel and Sterling DCXXVIII | January 23, 2023 | 0.35 |
| 1041 | 6 | Chanel and Sterling DCXXIX | January 23, 2023 | 0.25 |
| 1042 | 7 | Chanel and Sterling DCXXX | January 23, 2023 | 0.24 |
| 1043 | 8 | Chanel and Sterling DCXXXI | January 30, 2023 | 0.22 |
| 1044 | 9 | Chanel and Sterling DCXXXII | January 30, 2023 | 0.24 |
| 1045 | 10 | Chanel and Sterling DCXXXIII | January 30, 2023 | 0.24 |
| 1046 | 11 | Chanel and Sterling DCXXXIV | January 30, 2023 | 0.28 |
| 1047 | 12 | Chanel and Sterling DCXXXV | February 6, 2023 | 0.26 |
| 1048 | 13 | Chanel and Sterling DCXXXVI | February 6, 2023 | 0.29 |
| 1049 | 14 | Chanel and Sterling DCXXXVII | February 6, 2023 | 0.30 |
| 1050 | 15 | Chanel and Sterling DCXXXVIII | February 6, 2023 | 0.26 |
| 1051 | 16 | Chanel and Sterling DCXXXIX | February 13, 2023 | 0.21 |
| 1052 | 17 | Chanel and Sterling DCXL | February 13, 2023 | 0.25 |
| 1053 | 18 | Chanel and Sterling DCXLI | February 13, 2023 | 0.28 |
| 1054 | 19 | Chanel and Sterling DCXLII | February 13, 2023 | 0.27 |
| 1055 | 20 | Chanel and Sterling DCXLIII | February 20, 2023 | 0.23 |
| 1056 | 21 | Chanel and Sterling DCXLIV | February 20, 2023 | 0.27 |
| 1057 | 22 | Chanel and Sterling DCXLV | February 20, 2023 | 0.23 |
| 1058 | 23 | Chanel and Sterling DCXLVI | February 20, 2023 | 0.25 |
| 1059 | 24 | Chanel and Sterling DCXLVII | February 27, 2023 | 0.24 |
| 1060 | 25 | Chanel and Sterling DCXLVIII | February 27, 2023 | 0.19 |
| 1061 | 26 | Chanel and Sterling DCXLIX | February 27, 2023 | 0.19 |
| 1062 | 27 | Chanel and Sterling DCL | February 27, 2023 | 0.20 |
| 1063 | 28 | Chanel and Sterling DCLI | March 6, 2023 | 0.27 |
| 1064 | 29 | Chanel and Sterling DCLII | March 6, 2023 | 0.31 |
| 1065 | 30 | Chanel and Sterling DCLIII | March 6, 2023 | 0.31 |
| 1066 | 31 | Chanel and Sterling DCLIV | March 6, 2023 | 0.27 |
| 1067 | 32 | Chanel and Sterling DCLV | March 13, 2023 | 0.24 |
| 1068 | 33 | Chanel and Sterling DCLVI | March 13, 2023 | 0.25 |
| 1069 | 34 | Chanel and Sterling DCLVII | March 15, 2023 | 0.23 |
| 1070 | 35 | Chanel and Sterling DCLVIII | March 15, 2023 | 0.21 |
| 1071 | 36 | Chanel and Sterling DCLIX | March 20, 2023 | 0.20 |
| 1072 | 37 | Chanel and Sterling DCLX | March 20, 2023 | 0.24 |
| 1073 | 38 | Chanel and Sterling DCLXI | March 22, 2023 | 0.27 |
| 1074 | 39 | Chanel and Sterling DCLXII | March 22, 2023 | 0.22 |
| 1075 | 40 | Chanel and Sterling DCLXIII | March 27, 2023 | 0.26 |
| 1076 | 41 | Chanel and Sterling DCLXIV | March 27, 2023 | 0.28 |
| 1077 | 42 | Chanel and Sterling DCLXV | March 29, 2023 | 0.24 |
| 1078 | 43 | Chanel and Sterling DCLXVI | March 29, 2023 | 0.21 |

=== Season 31 (2023) ===
The season premiered on MTV on April 3, 2023, with two episodes: Sterling and Karrueche Tran and Sterling and Karrueche Tran VIIII and concluded on April 12, 2023, with two episodes: Sterling and Lolo Wood and Sterling and Lolo Wood II.

Notes: The 31st season had an all-star lineup of temporary celebrity guests' co-hosts, after Chanel West Coast left the show after 30 seasons. Also, the background of the set was reverted back to red and black since Season 10. This is the first and only shortest season of the show.

| No. in series | No. in season | Guest | Original air date | U.S. viewers (millions) |
|---|---|---|---|---|
| 1079 | 1 | Sterling and Karrueche Tran | April 3, 2023 | 0.24 |
| 1080 | 2 | Sterling and Karrueche Tran II | April 3, 2023 | 0.29 |
| 1081 | 3 | Sterling and Nina Agdal | April 5, 2023 | 0.24 |
| 1082 | 4 | Sterling and Nina Agdal II | April 5, 2023 | 0.24 |
| 1083 | 5 | Sterling and Carly Aquilino | April 10, 2023 | 0.22 |
| 1084 | 6 | Sterling and Carly Aquilino II | April 10, 2023 | 0.24 |
| 1085 | 7 | Sterling and Lolo Wood | April 12, 2023 | 0.19 |
| 1086 | 8 | Sterling and Lolo Wood II | April 12, 2023 | 0.20 |

=== Season 32 (2023) ===
The season premiered on MTV on April 17, 2023, with four episodes: Sterling and Camille Kostek, Sterling and Camille Kostek II, Sterling and Karrueche Tran III and Sterling and Karrueche Tran VI and concluded on May 8, 2023, with two episodes Sterling and Brie Bella and Sterling and Brie Bella II.

| No. in series | No. in season | Guest | Original air date | U.S. viewers (millions) |
|---|---|---|---|---|
| 1087 | 1 | Sterling and Camille Kostek | April 17, 2023 | 0.18 |
| 1088 | 2 | Sterling and Camille Kostek II | April 17, 2023 | 0.19 |
| 1089 | 3 | Sterling and Karrueche Tran III | April 17, 2023 | 0.22 |
| 1090 | 4 | Sterling and Karrueche Tran V | April 17, 2023 | 0.21 |
| 1091 | 5 | Sterling and B. Simone | April 24, 2023 | 0.18 |
| 1092 | 6 | Sterling and B. Simone II | April 24, 2023 | 0.21 |
| 1093 | 7 | Sterling and B. Simone III | April 24, 2023 | 0.22 |
| 1094 | 8 | Sterling and B. Simone IV | April 24, 2023 | 0.24 |
| 1095 | 9 | Sterling and Madison Beer II | April 26, 2023 | 0.17 |
| 1096 | 10 | Sterling and Madison Beer III | April 26, 2023 | 0.20 |
| 1097 | 11 | Sterling and Madison Beer IV | April 26, 2023 | 0.23 |
| 1098 | 12 | Sterling and Madison Beer V | April 26, 2023 | 0.24 |
| 1099 | 13 | Sterling and Rachel Wolfson | May 1, 2023 | 0.18 |
| 1100 | 14 | Sterling and Rachel Wolfson II | May 1, 2023 | 0.20 |
| 1101 | 15 | Sterling and Rachel Wolfson III | May 1, 2023 | 0.20 |
| 1102 | 16 | Sterling and Rachel Wolfson IV | May 1, 2023 | 0.19 |
| 1103 | 17 | Sterling and Nikki Blades | May 3, 2023 | 0.18 |
| 1104 | 18 | Sterling and Nikki Blades II | May 3, 2023 | 0.18 |
| 1105 | 19 | Sterling and Nikki Blades III | May 3, 2023 | 0.20 |
| 1106 | 20 | Sterling and Nikki Blades IV | May 3, 2023 | 0.23 |
| 1107 | 21 | Sterling and Brie Bella | May 8, 2023 | 0.22 |
| 1108 | 22 | Sterling and Brie Bella II | May 8, 2023 | 0.22 |

=== Season 33 (2023) ===
The season premiered on MTV on May 8, 2023, with two episodes: Sterling and Brie Bella III and Sterling and Brie Bella IV and concluded on July 7, 2023, with three episodes: Sterling and Karrueche Tran XIII, Sterling and Karrueche Tran XVIII and Sterling and Karrueche Tran XIX.

| No. in series | No. in season | Guest | Original air date | U.S. viewers (millions) |
|---|---|---|---|---|
| 1109 | 1 | Sterling and Brie Bella III | May 8, 2023 | 0.28 |
| 1110 | 2 | Sterling and Brie Bella IV | May 8, 2023 | 0.30 |
| 1111 | 3 | Sterling and Maddy Smith | May 10, 2023 | 0.16 |
| 1112 | 4 | Sterling and Maddy Smith II | May 10, 2023 | 0.15 |
| 1113 | 5 | Sterling and Maddy Smith III | May 10, 2023 | 0.23 |
| 1114 | 6 | Sterling and Maddy Smith IV | May 10, 2023 | 0.22 |
| 1115 | 7 | Sterling and The Stallone Sisters | May 15, 2023 | 0.19 |
| 1116 | 8 | Sterling and The Stallone Sisters II | May 15, 2023 | 0.22 |
| 1117 | 9 | Sterling and Camille Kostek III | May 15, 2023 | 0.23 |
| 1118 | 10 | Sterling and Camille Kostek IV | May 15, 2023 | 0.28 |
| 1119 | 11 | Sterling and Karrueche Tran VI | May 17, 2023 | 0.20 |
| 1120 | 12 | Sterling and Karrueche Tran VIII | May 17, 2023 | 0.20 |
| 1121 | 13 | Sterling and Karrueche Tran IV | May 17, 2023 | 0.21 |
| 1122 | 14 | Sterling and Karrueche Tran V | May 17, 2023 | 0.23 |
| 1123 | 15 | Sterling and Nina Agdal IV | May 22, 2023 | 0.20 |
| 1124 | 16 | Sterling and Nina Agdal III | May 22, 2023 | 0.18 |
| 1125 | 17 | Sterling and Nina Agdal V | May 22, 2023 | 0.16 |
| 1126 | 18 | Sterling and Nina Agdal IX | May 22, 2023 | 0.18 |
| 1127 | 19 | Sterling and Lolo Wood III | May 24, 2023 | 0.18 |
| 1128 | 20 | Sterling and Lolo Wood | May 24, 2023 | 0.21 |
| 1129 | 21 | Sterling and Lolo Wood VI | May 24, 2023 | 0.20 |
| 1130 | 22 | Sterling and Lolo Wood IX | May 24, 2023 | 0.22 |
| 1131 | 23 | Sterling and Carly Aquilino III | May 29, 2023 | 0.21 |
| 1132 | 24 | Sterling and Carly Aquilino VI | May 29, 2023 | 0.17 |
| 1133 | 25 | Sterling and Carly Aquilino IX | May 29, 2023 | 0.18 |
| 1134 | 26 | Sterling and Carly Aquilino V | May 29, 2023 | 0.18 |
| 1135 | 27 | Sterling and Madison Beer VI | May 31, 2023 | 0.19 |
| 1136 | 28 | Sterling and Madison Beer VIII | May 31, 2023 | 0.21 |
| 1137 | 29 | Sterling and Madison Beer IX | May 31, 2023 | 0.22 |
| 1138 | 30 | Sterling and Madison Beer X | May 31, 2023 | 0.18 |
| 1139 | 31 | Sterling and Draya Michele | June 5, 2023 | 0.20 |
| 1140 | 32 | Sterling and Draya Michele II | June 5, 2023 | 0.25 |
| 1141 | 33 | Sterling and Draya Michele III | June 5, 2023 | 0.26 |
| 1142 | 34 | Sterling and Draya Michele IV | June 5, 2023 | 0.27 |
| 1143 | 35 | Sterling and Karrueche Tran IX | June 7, 2023 | 0.19 |
| 1144 | 36 | Sterling and Karrueche Tran X | June 7, 2023 | 0.22 |
| 1145 | 37 | Sterling and Karrueche Tran XI | June 9, 2023 | 0.21 |
| 1146 | 38 | Sterling and Karrueche Tran XII | June 9, 2023 | 0.23 |
| 1147 | 39 | Sterling and Nina Agdal VI | June 12, 2023 | 0.26 |
| 1148 | 40 | Sterling and Nina Agdal VII | June 12, 2023 | 0.20 |
| 1149 | 41 | Sterling and Nina Agdal X | June 12, 2023 | 0.20 |
| 1150 | 42 | Sterling and Nina Agdal XI | June 12, 2023 | 0.24 |
| 1151 | 43 | Sterling and Lolo Wood IV | June 14, 2023 | 0.21 |
| 1152 | 44 | Sterling and Lolo Wood XII | June 14, 2023 | 0.23 |
| 1153 | 45 | Sterling and Lolo Wood VII | June 14, 2023 | 0.24 |
| 1154 | 46 | Sterling and Lolo Wood XVI | June 14, 2023 | 0.20 |
| 1155 | 47 | Sterling and Carly Aquilino IV | June 16, 2023 | 0.14 |
| 1156 | 48 | Sterling and Carly Aquilino XIII | June 16, 2023 | 0.16 |
| 1157 | 49 | Sterling and Carly Aquilino VII | June 16, 2023 | 0.17 |
| 1158 | 50 | Sterling and Carly Aquilino XI | June 16, 2023 | 0.18 |
| 1159 | 51 | Sterling and Camille Kostek V | June 19, 2023 | 0.19 |
| 1160 | 52 | Sterling and Camille Kostek VI | June 19, 2023 | 0.21 |
| 1161 | 53 | Sterling and Camille Kostek VII | June 19, 2023 | 0.21 |
| 1162 | 54 | Sterling and Camille Kostek VIII | June 19, 2023 | 0.21 |
| 1163 | 55 | Sterling and Karrueche Tran XIV | June 21, 2023 | 0.27 |
| 1164 | 56 | Sterling and Karrueche Tran XV | June 21, 2023 | 0.26 |
| 1165 | 57 | Sterling and Karrueche Tran XVI | June 21, 2023 | 0.29 |
| 1166 | 58 | Sterling and Karrueche Tran XVII | June 21, 2023 | 0.27 |
| 1167 | 59 | Sterling and Brittney Elena | June 23, 2023 | 0.23 |
| 1168 | 60 | Sterling and Brittney Elena II | June 23, 2023 | 0.22 |
| 1169 | 61 | Sterling and Brittney Elena III | June 23, 2023 | 0.21 |
| 1170 | 62 | Sterling and Brittney Elena IV | June 23, 2023 | 0.23 |
| 1171 | 63 | Sterling and Nina Agdal VIII | June 26, 2023 | 0.17 |
| 1172 | 64 | Sterling and Nina Agdal XIV | June 26, 2023 | 0.17 |
| 1173 | 65 | Sterling and Nina Agdal XII | June 26, 2023 | 0.23 |
| 1174 | 66 | Sterling and Nina Agdal XIII | June 26, 2023 | 0.22 |
| 1175 | 67 | Sterling and Lolo Wood XI | June 28, 2023 | 0.22 |
| 1176 | 68 | Sterling and Lolo Wood XVII | June 28, 2023 | 0.21 |
| 1177 | 69 | Sterling and Lolo Wood XIII | June 28, 2023 | 0.17 |
| 1178 | 70 | Sterling and Lolo Wood VIII | June 28, 2023 | 0.23 |
| 1179 | 71 | Sterling and Teala Dunn | June 30, 2023 | N/A |
| 1180 | 72 | Sterling and Teala Dunn II | June 30, 2023 | N/A |
| 1181 | 73 | Sterling and Teala Dunn III | June 30, 2023 | N/A |
| 1182 | 74 | Sterling and Teala Dunn IV | June 30, 2023 | N/A |
| 1183 | 75 | Sterling and Carly Aquilino VIII | July 3, 2023 | N/A |
| 1184 | 76 | Sterling and Carly Aquilino XII | July 3, 2023 | N/A |
| 1185 | 77 | Sterling and Carly Aquilino X | July 3, 2023 | N/A |
| 1186 | 78 | Sterling and Carly Aquilino XIV | July 3, 2023 | N/A |
| 1188 | 79 | Sterling and Camille Kostek IX | July 5, 2023 | N/A |
| 1188 | 80 | Sterling and Camille Kostek X | July 5, 2023 | N/A |
| 1189 | 81 | Sterling and Camille Kostek XI | July 5, 2023 | N/A |
| 1190 | 82 | Sterling and Camille Kostek XII | July 5, 2023 | N/A |
| 1191 | 83 | Sterling and Karrueche Tran XIII | July 7, 2023 | N/A |
| 1192 | 84 | Sterling and Karrueche Tran XVIII | July 7, 2023 | N/A |
| 1193 | 85 | Sterling and Karrueche Tran XIX | July 7, 2023 | N/A |

=== Season 34 (2023) ===
The season premiered on MTV on July 7, 2023, with one episode: Sterling and Karrueche Tran XX and concluded on July 24, 2023, with three episodes: Sterling and Karrueche Tran XXI, Sterling and Karrueche Tran XXII and Sterling and Karrueche Tran XXIII.

| No. in series | No. in season | Guest | Original air date | U.S. viewers (millions) |
|---|---|---|---|---|
| 1194 | 1 | Sterling and Karrueche Tran XX | July 7, 2023 | N/A |
| 1195 | 2 | Sterling and Lolo Wood X | July 10, 2023 | N/A |
| 1196 | 3 | Sterling and Lolo Wood XIV | July 10, 2023 | N/A |
| 1197 | 4 | Sterling and Lolo Wood XV | July 10, 2023 | N/A |
| 1198 | 5 | Sterling and Lolo Wood XVIII | July 10, 2023 | N/A |
| 1199 | 6 | Sterling and Nina Agdal XV | July 12, 2023 | N/A |
| 1200 | 7 | Sterling and Nina Agdal XVI | July 12, 2023 | N/A |
| 1201 | 8 | Sterling and Nina Agdal XVII | July 12, 2023 | N/A |
| 1202 | 9 | Sterling and Nina Agdal XVIII | July 12, 2023 | N/A |
| 1203 | 10 | Sterling and Carly Aquilino XV | July 14, 2023 | N/A |
| 1204 | 11 | Sterling and Carly Aquilino XVI | July 14, 2023 | N/A |
| 1205 | 12 | Sterling and Carly Aquilino XVII | July 16, 2023 | N/A |
| 1206 | 13 | Sterling and Carly Aquilino XVIII | July 16, 2023 | N/A |
| 1207 | 14 | Sterling and Camille Kostek XIII | July 17, 2023 | N/A |
| 1208 | 15 | Sterling and Camille Kostek XIV | July 17, 2023 | N/A |
| 1209 | 16 | Sterling and Camille Kostek XV | July 17, 2023 | N/A |
| 1210 | 17 | Sterling and Lolo Wood XIX | July 21, 2023 | N/A |
| 1211 | 18 | Sterling and Lolo Wood XX | July 21, 2023 | N/A |
| 1212 | 19 | Sterling and Lolo Wood XXI | July 21, 2023 | N/A |
| 1213 | 20 | Sterling and Lolo Wood XXII | July 23, 2023 | N/A |
| 1214 | 21 | Sterling and Camille Kostek XVI | July 23, 2023 | N/A |
| 1215 | 22 | Sterling and Karrueche Tran XXI | July 24, 2023 | N/A |
| 1216 | 23 | Sterling and Karrueche Tran XXII | July 24, 2023 | N/A |
| 1217 | 24 | Sterling and Karrueche Tran XXIII | July 24, 2023 | N/A |

=== Season 35 (2023) ===
The season premiered MTV on July 28, 2023, with three episodes: Sterling and Carly Aquilino XXVI and Sterling and Carly Aquilino XIX and Sterling and Carly Aquilino XX.

| No. in series | No. in season | Guest | Original air date | U.S. viewers (millions) |
|---|---|---|---|---|
| 1218 | 1 | Sterling and Carly Aquilino XXVI | July 28, 2023 | N/A |
| 1219 | 2 | Sterling and Carly Aquilino XIX | July 28, 2023 | N/A |
| 1220 | 3 | Sterling and Carly Aquilino XX | July 28, 2023 | N/A |
| 1221 | 4 | Sterling and Nina Agdal XX | July 30, 2023 | N/A |
| 1222 | 5 | Sterling and Nina Agdal XXI | July 30, 2023 | N/A |
| 1223 | 6 | Sterling and Lolo Wood XXI | July 31, 2023 | N/A |
| 1224 | 7 | Sterling and Lolo Wood XXII | July 31, 2023 | N/A |
| 1225 | 8 | Sterling and Lolo Wood XXIII | July 31, 2023 | N/A |
| 1226 | 9 | Sterling and Nina Agdal XXII | August 4, 2023 | N/A |
| 1227 | 10 | Sterling and Nina Agdal XXIII | August 4, 2023 | N/A |
| 1228 | 11 | Sterling and Nina Agdal XXIV | August 4, 2023 | N/A |
| 1229 | 12 | Sterling and Camille Kostek XVII | August 6, 2023 | N/A |
| 1230 | 13 | Sterling and Camille Kostek XVIII | August 6, 2023 | N/A |
| 1231 | 14 | Sterling and Carly Aquilino XXI | August 7, 2023 | N/A |
| 1232 | 15 | Sterling and Carly Aquilino XXII | August 7, 2023 | N/A |
| 1231 | 16 | Sterling and Carly Aquilino XXIII | August 7, 2023 | N/A |
| 1232 | 17 | Sterling and Nina Agdal XXXI | August 13, 2023 | N/A |
| 1233 | 18 | Sterling and Nina Agdal XXXII | August 13, 2023 | N/A |
| 1234 | 19 | Sterling and Lolo Wood XXVI | August 14, 2023 | N/A |
| 1235 | 20 | Sterling and Lolo Wood XXVII | August 14, 2023 | N/A |
| 1236 | 21 | Sterling and Lolo Wood XXVIII | August 14, 2023 | N/A |
| 1237 | 22 | Sterling and Nina Agdal XLI | August 18, 2023 | N/A |
| 1238 | 23 | Sterling and Nina Agdal XXVII | August 18, 2023 | N/A |
| 1239 | 24 | Sterling and Nina Agdal XXIX | August 18, 2023 | N/A |
| 1240 | 25 | Sterling and Karrueche Tran XXX | August 20, 2023 | N/A |
| 1241 | 26 | Sterling and Karrueche Tran XXXI | August 20, 2023 | N/A |
| 1242 | 27 | Sterling and Nina Agdal XXIV | August 21, 2023 | N/A |
| 1243 | 28 | Sterling and Nina Agdal XXV | August 21, 2023 | N/A |
| 1244 | 29 | Sterling and Nina Agdal XXVI | August 21, 2023 | N/A |
| 1245 | 30 | Sterling and Karrueche Tran XXIV | August 25, 2023 | N/A |
| 1246 | 31 | Sterling and Karrueche Tran XXVII | August 25, 2023 | N/A |
| 1247 | 32 | Sterling and Karrueche Tran XXVIII | August 25, 2023 | N/A |
| 1248 | 33 | Sterling and Carly Aquilino XXVIII | August 27, 2023 | N/A |
| 1249 | 34 | Sterling and Carly Aquilino XXIX | August 27, 2023 | N/A |
| 1250 | 35 | Sterling and Karrueche Tran XXV | August 28, 2023 | N/A |
| 1251 | 36 | Sterling and Karrueche Tran XXVI | August 28, 2023 | N/A |
| 1252 | 37 | Sterling and Karrueche Tran XXIX | August 28, 2023 | N/A |
| 1253 | 38 | Sterling and Carly Aquilino XXIV | September 1, 2023 | N/A |
| 1254 | 39 | Sterling and Carly Aquilino XXV | September 1, 2023 | N/A |
| 1255 | 40 | Sterling and Carly Aquilino XXVII | September 1, 2023 | N/A |
| 1256 | 41 | Sterling and Arielle Vandenberg | September 3, 2023 | N/A |
| 1257 | 42 | Sterling and Arielle Vandenberg II | September 3, 2023 | N/A |
| 1258 | 43 | Sterling and Nina Agdal XXVIII | September 4, 2023 | N/A |
| 1259 | 44 | Sterling and Nina Agdal XXX | September 4, 2023 | N/A |
| 1260 | 45 | Sterling and Nina Agdal XXXIII | September 4, 2023 | N/A |
| 1261 | 46 | Sterling and Karrueche Tran XXXII | September 8, 2023 | N/A |
| 1262 | 47 | Sterling and Karrueche Tran XXXIII | September 8, 2023 | N/A |
| 1263 | 48 | Sterling and Karrueche Tran XXXIV | September 8, 2023 | N/A |
| 1264 | 49 | Sterling and Rocsi Diaz | September 10, 2023 | N/A |
| 1265 | 50 | Sterling and Rocsi Diaz II | September 10, 2023 | N/A |
| 1266 | 51 | Sterling and Carly Aquilino XXX | September 11, 2023 | N/A |
| 1267 | 52 | Sterling and Carly Aquilino XXXI | September 11, 2023 | N/A |
| 1268 | 53 | Sterling and Carly Aquilino XXXII | September 11, 2023 | N/A |
| 1269 | 54 | Sterling and Karrueche Tran XXXIX | September 15, 2023 | N/A |
| 1270 | 55 | Sterling and Karrueche Tran XXXV | September 15, 2023 | N/A |
| 1271 | 56 | Sterling and Karrueche Tran XL | September 15, 2023 | N/A |
| 1272 | 57 | Sterling and Nina Agdal XXXIV | September 17, 2023 | N/A |
| 1273 | 58 | Sterling and Nina Agdal XXXV | September 17, 2023 | N/A |
| 1274 | 59 | Sterling and Karrueche Tran XXXVI | September 18, 2023 | N/A |
| 1275 | 60 | Sterling and Karrueche Tran XXXVII | September 18, 2023 | N/A |
| 1276 | 61 | Sterling and Karrueche Tran XXXVIII | September 18, 2023 | N/A |
| 1277 | 62 | Sterling and Carly Aquilino XXXIII | September 22, 2023 | N/A |
| 1278 | 63 | Sterling and Carly Aquilino XXXIV | September 22, 2023 | N/A |
| 1279 | 64 | Sterling and Carly Aquilino XXXVI | September 22, 2023 | N/A |
| 1280 | 65 | Sterling and Nina Agdal XXXVII | September 24, 2023 | N/A |
| 1281 | 66 | Sterling and Nina Agdal XXXVIII | September 24, 2023 | N/A |
| 1282 | 67 | Sterling and Carly Aquilino XXXV | September 25, 2023 | N/A |
| 1283 | 68 | Sterling and Carly Aquilino XXXVII | September 25, 2023 | N/A |

=== Season 36 (2023) ===
The season premiered on MTV on September 25, 2023, with one episode: Sterling and Carly Aquilino XXXVIII and concluded on October 30, 2023 with three episodes: Sterling and Nina Agdal XXVII, Sterling and Nina Agdal XXVIII and Sterling and Nina Agdal XLV.

| No. in series | No. in season | Guest | Original air date | U.S. viewers (millions) |
|---|---|---|---|---|
| 1284 | 1 | Sterling and Carly Aquilino XXXVIII | September 25, 2023 | N/A |
| 1285 | 2 | Sterling and Nina Agdal XXXIX | September 29, 2023 | N/A |
| 1286 | 3 | Sterling and Nina Agdal XL | September 29, 2023 | N/A |
| 1287 | 4 | Sterling and Nina Agdal XXXVI | September 29, 2023 | N/A |
| 1288 | 5 | Sterling and Nina Agdal XLII | October 2, 2023 | N/A |
| 1289 | 6 | Sterling and Nina Agdal XLIII | October 2, 2023 | N/A |
| 1290 | 7 | Sterling and Nina Agdal XLIV | October 2, 2023 | N/A |
| 1291 | 8 | Sterling and Carly Aquilino XLI | October 6, 2023 | N/A |
| 1291 | 9 | Sterling and Carly Aquilino XLII | October 6, 2023 | N/A |
| 1291 | 10 | Sterling and Carly Aquilino XLIII | October 6, 2023 | N/A |
| 1292 | 11 | Sterling and Carly Aquilino XLVI | October 9, 2023 | N/A |
| 1293 | 12 | Sterling and Carly Aquilino XLV | October 9, 2023 | N/A |
| 1294 | 13 | Sterling and Carly Aquilino XLVII | October 9, 2023 | N/A |
| 1295 | 14 | Sterling and Nina Agdal XLVII | October 13, 2023 | N/A |
| 1296 | 15 | Sterling and Nina Agdal XLVIII | October 13, 2023 | N/A |
| 1297 | 16 | Sterling and Nina Agdal XLIX | October 13, 2023 | N/A |
| 1298 | 17 | Sterling and Rocsi Diaz III | October 16, 2023 | N/A |
| 1299 | 18 | Sterling and Rocsi Diaz IV | October 16, 2023 | N/A |
| 1300 | 19 | Sterling and Rocsi Diaz V | October 16, 2023 | N/A |
| 1301 | 20 | Sterling and Carly Aquilino XLVIII | October 20, 2023 | N/A |
| 1302 | 21 | Sterling and Carly Aquilino XLIX | October 20, 2023 | N/A |
| 1303 | 22 | Sterling and Carly Aquilino L | October 20, 2023 | N/A |
| 1304 | 23 | Sterling and Carly Aquilino LIII | October 23, 2023 | N/A |
| 1305 | 24 | Sterling and Carly Aquilino LIV | October 23, 2023 | N/A |
| 1306 | 25 | Sterling and Carly Aquilino LV | October 23, 2023 | N/A |
| 1307 | 26 | Sterling and Nina Agdal LIII | October 27, 2023 | N/A |
| 1308 | 27 | Sterling and Nina Agdal LIV | October 27, 2023 | N/A |
| 1309 | 28 | Sterling and Nina Agdal LV | October 27, 2023 | N/A |
| 1310 | 29 | Sterling and Nina Agdal XXXVII | October 30, 2023 | N/A |
| 1311 | 30 | Sterling and Nina Agdal XXXVIII | October 30, 2023 | N/A |
| 1312 | 31 | Sterling and Nina Agdal XLV | October 30, 2023 | N/A |

=== Season 37 (2023) ===
The season premiered on MTV on November 3, 2023, with four episodes: Sterling and Camille Kostek XIX, Sterling and Camille Kostek XX, Sterling and Karrueche Tran XLI and Sterling and Karrueche Tran XLII and concluded on December 22, 2023 with one episode: Sterling and Nina Agdal LVI.

| No. in series | No. in season | Guest | Original air date | U.S. viewers (millions) |
|---|---|---|---|---|
| 1313 | 1 | Sterling and Camille Kostek XIX | November 3, 2023 | N/A |
| 1314 | 2 | Sterling and Camille Kostek XX | November 3, 2023 | N/A |
| 1315 | 3 | Sterling and Karrueche Tran XLI | November 3, 2023 | N/A |
| 1316 | 4 | Sterling and Karrueche Tran XLII | November 3, 2023 | N/A |
| 1317 | 5 | Sterling and Camille Kostek XXI | November 6, 2023 | N/A |
| 1318 | 6 | Sterling and Camille Kostek XXII | November 6, 2023 | N/A |
| 1319 | 7 | Sterling and Rocsi Diaz VIII | November 10, 2023 | N/A |
| 1320 | 8 | Sterling and Rocsi Diaz IX | November 10, 2023 | N/A |
| 1321 | 9 | Sterling and Karrueche Tran XLIII | November 13, 2023 | N/A |
| 1322 | 10 | Sterling and Karrueche Tran XLIV | November 13, 2023 | N/A |
| 1323 | 11 | Sterling and Carly Aquilino LII | November 17, 2023 | N/A |
| 1324 | 12 | Sterling and Carly Aquilino LIII | November 17, 2023 | N/A |
| 1325 | 13 | Sterling and Camille Kostek XXIII | November 17, 2023 | N/A |
| 1326 | 14 | Sterling and Camille Kostek XXIV | November 17, 2023 | N/A |
| 1327 | 15 | Sterling and Camille Kostek XXV | December 1, 2023 | N/A |
| 1328 | 16 | Sterling and Camille Kostek XXVI | December 1, 2023 | N/A |
| 1329 | 17 | Sterling and Nina Agdal L | December 1, 2023 | N/A |
| 1330 | 18 | Sterling and Nina Agdal LI | December 1, 2023 | N/A |
| 1331 | 19 | Sterling and Rocsi Diaz X | December 1, 2023 | N/A |
| 1332 | 20 | Sterling and Rocsi Diaz XI | December 1, 2023 | N/A |
| 1333 | 21 | Sterling and Carly Aquilino LXIV | December 8, 2023 | N/A |
| 1334 | 22 | Sterling and Carly Aquilino LIV | December 8, 2023 | N/A |
| 1335 | 23 | Sterling and Karrueche Tran XLVI | December 8, 2023 | N/A |
| 1336 | 24 | Sterling and Karrueche Tran XLV | December 8, 2023 | N/A |
| 1337 | 25 | Sterling and Nina Agdal LII | December 8, 2023 | N/A |
| 1338 | 26 | Sterling and Nina Agdal LIII | December 8, 2023 | N/A |
| 1339 | 27 | Sterling and Rocsi Diaz XII | December 15, 2023 | N/A |
| 1340 | 28 | Sterling and Rocsi Diaz XIII | December 15, 2023 | N/A |
| 1341 | 29 | Sterling and Nina Agdal LIV | December 15, 2023 | N/A |
| 1342 | 30 | Sterling and Nina Agdal LV | December 15, 2023 | N/A |
| 1343 | 31 | Sterling and Carly Aquilino LV | December 15, 2023 | N/A |
| 1344 | 32 | Sterling and Carly Aquilino LVI | December 15, 2023 | N/A |
| 1345 | 33 | Sterling and Nina Agdal LVI | December 22, 2023 | N/A |

=== Season 38 (2023–24) ===
The season premiered on December 22, 2023, with five episodes: Sterling and Nina Agdal LVII, Sterling and Carly Aquilino LVII, Sterling and Carly Aquilino LVIII, Sterling and Karrueche Tran XLVII and Sterling and Karrueche Tran XLVII and concluded on April 14, 2024, with two episodes: Sterling and Karrueche Tran LV and Sterling and Karrueche Tran LVI.

Notes: Near at the end of the season, the area of the red sofa has been reconstructed back to the original since Season 19. Though a real audience still has not returned and still is to this day.

| No. in series | No. in season | Guest | Original air date | U.S. viewers (millions) |
|---|---|---|---|---|
| 1346 | 1 | Sterling and Nina Agdal LVII | December 22, 2023 | N/A |
| 1347 | 2 | Sterling and Carly Aquilino LVII | December 22, 2023 | N/A |
| 1348 | 3 | Sterling and Carly Aquilino LVIII | December 22, 2023 | N/A |
| 1349 | 4 | Sterling and Karrueche Tran XLVII | December 22, 2023 | N/A |
| 1350 | 5 | Sterling and Karrueche Tran XLVIII | December 22, 2023 | N/A |
| 1351 | 6 | Sterling and Carly Aquilino LIX | December 29, 2023 | N/A |
| 1352 | 7 | Sterling and Carly Aquilino LX | December 29, 2023 | N/A |
| 1353 | 8 | Sterling and Karrueche Tran XLIX | December 29, 2023 | N/A |
| 1354 | 9 | Sterling and Karrueche Tran L | December 29, 2023 | N/A |
| 1355 | 10 | Sterling and Rocsi Diaz XIV | December 29, 2023 | N/A |
| 1356 | 11 | Sterling and Rocsi Diaz XV | December 29, 2023 | N/A |
| 1357 | 12 | Sterling with Nina Agdal and Mike The Situation Sorrentino | January 4, 2024 | N/A |
| 1358 | 13 | Sterling with Nina Agdal and Mike The Situation Sorrentino II | January 4, 2024 | N/A |
| 1359 | 14 | Sterling with Nina Agdal and Angelina Pivarnick | January 11, 2024 | N/A |
| 1360 | 15 | Sterling with Nina Agdal and Angelina Pivarnick II | January 11, 2024 | N/A |
| 1361 | 16 | Sterling with Nina Agdal and Jenni JWOWW Farley | January 18, 2024 | N/A |
| 1362 | 17 | Sterling with Nina Agdal and Jenni JWOWW Farley II | January 18, 2024 | N/A |
| 1363 | 18 | Sterling with Nina Agdal and Angelina Pivarnick III | January 25, 2024 | N/A |
| 1364 | 19 | Sterling with Nina Agdal and Angelina Pivarnick IV | January 25, 2024 | N/A |
| 1365 | 20 | Sterling with Nina Agdal and Mike The Situation Sorrentino III | February 1, 2024 | N/A |
| 1366 | 21 | Sterling with Nina Agdal and Jenni JWOWW Farley III | February 1, 2024 | N/A |
| 1367 | 22 | Sterling with Lolo Wood and Gigi Goode | March 1, 2024 | N/A |
| 1368 | 23 | Sterling with Lolo Wood and Mo Heart | March 1, 2024 | N/A |
| 1369 | 24 | Sterling and Carly Aquilino LXI | March 3, 2024 | N/A |
| 1370 | 25 | Sterling and Carly Aquilino LXII | March 3, 2024 | N/A |
| 1371 | 26 | Sterling and Carly Aquilino LXIII | March 3, 2024 | N/A |
| 1372 | 27 | Sterling and Carly Aquilino LXV | March 3, 2024 | N/A |
| 1373 | 28 | Sterling with Lolo Wood and Jessica Wild | March 8, 2024 | N/A |
| 1374 | 29 | Sterling with Lolo Wood and Symone | March 8, 2024 | N/A |
| 1375 | 30 | Sterling and Karrueche Tran LI | March 10, 2024 | N/A |
| 1376 | 31 | Sterling and Karrueche Tran LII | March 10, 2024 | N/A |
| 1377 | 32 | Sterling and Karrueche Tran LIII | March 10, 2024 | N/A |
| 1378 | 33 | Sterling and Karrueche Tran LIV | March 10, 2024 | N/A |
| 1379 | 34 | Sterling and Nina Agdal LVIII | March 17, 2024 | N/A |
| 1380 | 35 | Sterling and Nina Agdal LIX | March 17, 2024 | N/A |
| 1381 | 36 | Sterling and Nina Agdal LX | March 17, 2024 | N/A |
| 1382 | 37 | Sterling and Nina Agdal LXI | March 17, 2024 | N/A |
| 1383 | 38 | Sterling and Lolo Wood XXIX | March 24, 2024 | N/A |
| 1384 | 39 | Sterling and Lolo Wood XXX | March 24, 2024 | N/A |
| 1385 | 40 | Sterling and Lolo Wood XXXI | March 24, 2024 | N/A |
| 1386 | 41 | Sterling and Lolo Wood XXXII | March 24, 2024 | N/A |
| 1387 | 42 | Sterling and Carly Aquilino LXVI | March 31, 2024 | N/A |
| 1388 | 43 | Sterling and Carly Aquilino LXVII | March 31, 2024 | N/A |
| 1389 | 44 | Sterling and Carly Aquilino LXVIII | March 31, 2024 | N/A |
| 1390 | 45 | Sterling and Carly Aquilino LXIX | March 31, 2024 | N/A |
| 1391 | 46 | Sterling and Rocsi Diaz XVI | April 7, 2024 | N/A |
| 1392 | 47 | Sterling and Rocsi Diaz XVII | April 7, 2024 | N/A |
| 1393 | 48 | Sterling and Rocsi Diaz XVIII | April 7, 2024 | N/A |
| 1394 | 49 | Sterling and Rocsi Diaz XIX | April 7, 2024 | N/A |
| 1395 | 50 | Sterling and Karrueche Tran LV | April 14, 2024 | N/A |
| 1396 | 51 | Sterling and Karrueche Tran LVI | April 14, 2024 | N/A |

=== Season 39 (2024) ===
The season premiered on April 14, 2024, with two episodes: Sterling and Karrueche Tran LVII and Sterling and Karrueche Tran LVIII and concluded on April 21, 2024 with two episodes: Sterling and Lolo Wood XXXIII and Sterling and Lolo Wood XXXIV.

Note: This is the second shortest season of the show. Starting in season 39, the area of the red sofa has been reconstructed back to the original one since Season 19 and the seating were back to Steelo and now with celebrity female guest hosts and now Lauren "Lolo" Wood in Season 43.

| No. in series | No. in season | Guest | Original air date | U.S. viewers (millions) |
|---|---|---|---|---|
| 1397 | 1 | Sterling and Karrueche Tran LVII | April 14, 2024 | N/A |
| 1398 | 2 | Sterling and Karrueche Tran LVIII | April 14, 2024 | N/A |
| 1399 | 3 | Sterling and Lolo Wood XXXIII | April 21, 2024 | N/A |
| 1400 | 4 | Sterling and Lolo Wood XXXIV | April 21, 2024 | N/A |

=== Season 40 (2024) ===
The season premiered on April 21, 2024, with two episodes: Sterling and Lolo Wood XXXV and Sterling and Lolo Wood XXXVI and concluded on May 26, 2024 with four episodes: Sterling and Rocsi Diaz XX, Sterling and Rocsi Diaz XXII, Sterling and Rocsi Diaz XXIII and Sterling and Rocsi Diaz XXIV.

| No. in series | No. in season | Guest | Original air date | U.S. viewers (millions) |
|---|---|---|---|---|
| 1401 | 1 | Sterling and Lolo Wood XXXV | April 21, 2024 | N/A |
| 1402 | 2 | Sterling and Lolo Wood XXXVI | April 21, 2024 | N/A |
| 1403 | 3 | Sterling and Paige DeSorbo | April 28, 2024 | N/A |
| 1404 | 4 | Sterling and Paige DeSorbo II | April 28, 2024 | N/A |
| 1405 | 5 | Daymond John II | May 5, 2024 | N/A |
| 1406 | 6 | Daymond John III | May 5, 2024 | N/A |
| 1407 | 7 | Sterling and Lolo Wood XXXVII | May 5, 2024 | N/A |
| 1408 | 8 | Sterling and Lolo Wood XXXVIII | May 5, 2024 | N/A |
| 1409 | 9 | Sterling and Carly Aquilino LXX | May 12, 2024 | N/A |
| 1410 | 10 | Sterling and Carly Aquilino LXXI | May 12, 2024 | N/A |
| 1411 | 11 | Sterling and Carly Aquilino LXXII | May 12, 2024 | N/A |
| 1412 | 12 | Sterling and Carly Aquilino LXXIII | May 12, 2024 | N/A |
| 1413 | 13 | Teddy Swims | May 19, 2024 | N/A |
| 1414 | 14 | Sterling and Lolo Wood XXXIX | May 19, 2024 | N/A |
| 1415 | 15 | Sterling and Lolo Wood XL | May 19, 2024 | N/A |
| 1416 | 16 | Sterling and Lolo Wood XLI | May 19, 2024 | N/A |
| 1417 | 17 | Sterling and Rocsi Diaz XX | May 26, 2024 | N/A |
| 1418 | 18 | Sterling and Rocsi Diaz XXII | May 26, 2024 | N/A |
| 1419 | 19 | Sterling and Rocsi Diaz XXIII | May 26, 2024 | N/A |
| 1420 | 20 | Sterling and Rocsi Diaz XXIV | May 26, 2024 | N/A |

=== Season 41 (2024) ===
The season premiered on June 2, 2024, with four episodes: Dee Snider, Sterling and Lolo Wood XLII, Sterling and Lolo Wood XLIII and Sterling and Lolo Wood XLIV and concluded on June 16, 2024 with four episodes: Madison Pettis, Madison Pettis II, Sterling and Kristy Sarah and Sterling and Kristy Sarah II.

| No. in series | No. in season | Guest | Original air date | U.S. viewers (millions) |
|---|---|---|---|---|
| 1421 | 1 | Dee Snider | June 2, 2024 | N/A |
| 1422 | 2 | Sterling and Lolo Wood XLII | June 2, 2024 | N/A |
| 1423 | 3 | Sterling and Lolo Wood XLIII | June 2, 2024 | N/A |
| 1424 | 4 | Sterling and Lolo Wood XLIV | June 2, 2024 | N/A |
| 1425 | 5 | Nina Drama | June 9, 2024 | N/A |
| 1426 | 6 | Nina Drama II | June 9, 2024 | N/A |
| 1427 | 7 | Lexi Rivera | June 9, 2024 | N/A |
| 1428 | 8 | Lexi Rivera II | June 9, 2024 | N/A |
| 1429 | 9 | Madison Pettis | June 16, 2024 | N/A |
| 1430 | 10 | Madison Pettis II | June 16, 2024 | N/A |
| 1431 | 11 | Sterling and Kristy Sarah | June 16, 2024 | N/A |
| 1432 | 12 | Sterling and Kristy Sarah II | June 16, 2024 | N/A |

=== Season 42 (2024) ===
The season premiered on June 23, 2024, with four episodes: Brooke Schofield, Brooke Schofield II, Skye Townsend and Skye Townsend II and concluded on August 7, 2024 with two episodes: Sterling and Rocsi Diaz XXX and Sterling and Rocsi Diaz XXXI.

Note: This marked the final season for another red sofa since Season 18.

| No. in series | No. in season | Guest | Original air date | U.S. viewers (millions) |
|---|---|---|---|---|
| 1433 | 1 | Brooke Schofield | June 23, 2024 | N/A |
| 1434 | 2 | Brooke Schofield II | June 23, 2024 | N/A |
| 1435 | 3 | Skye Townsend | June 23, 2024 | N/A |
| 1436 | 4 | Skye Townsend II | June 23, 2024 | N/A |
| 1437 | 5 | Sterling and Karrueche Tran LIX | June 26, 2024 | N/A |
| 1438 | 6 | Sterling and Karrueche Tran LX | June 26, 2024 | N/A |
| 1439 | 7 | Sterling and Karrueche Tran LXI | June 26, 2024 | N/A |
| 1440 | 8 | Sterling and Karrueche Tran LXII | June 26, 2024 | N/A |
| 1441 | 9 | Sterling and Karrueche Tran LXIII | June 26, 2024 | N/A |
| 1442 | 10 | Sterling and Karrueche Tran LXIV | June 26, 2024 | N/A |
| 1443 | 11 | Sterling and Nina Agdal LXIV | July 3, 2024 | N/A |
| 1444 | 12 | Sterling and Nina Agdal LXV | July 3, 2024 | N/A |
| 1445 | 13 | Sterling and Nina Agdal LXVI | July 3, 2024 | N/A |
| 1446 | 14 | Sterling and Nina Agdal LXVII | July 3, 2024 | N/A |
| 1447 | 15 | Sterling and Nina Agdal LXVIII | July 3, 2024 | N/A |
| 1448 | 16 | Sterling and Nina Agdal LXIX | July 3, 2024 | N/A |
| 1449 | 17 | Sterling and Lolo Wood XLV | July 7, 2024 | N/A |
| 1450 | 18 | Sterling and Lolo Wood XLVI | July 7, 2024 | N/A |
| 1451 | 19 | Sterling and Lolo Wood XLVII | July 7, 2024 | N/A |
| 1452 | 20 | Sterling and Lolo Wood XLVIII | July 7, 2024 | N/A |
| 1453 | 21 | Sterling and Rocsi Diaz XXI | July 10, 2024 | N/A |
| 1454 | 22 | Sterling and Rocsi Diaz XXV | July 10, 2024 | N/A |
| 1455 | 23 | Sterling and Rocsi Diaz XXVI | July 10, 2024 | N/A |
| 1456 | 24 | Sterling and Rocsi Diaz XXVII | July 10, 2024 | N/A |
| 1457 | 25 | Sterling and Rocsi Diaz XXVIII | July 10, 2024 | N/A |
| 1458 | 26 | Sterling and Rocsi Diaz XXIX | July 10, 2024 | N/A |
| 1459 | 27 | Rahne Jones & Travis Mills | July 14, 2024 | N/A |
| 1460 | 28 | Sterling and Lolo Wood L | July 14, 2024 | N/A |
| 1461 | 29 | Sterling and Lolo Wood LI | July 14, 2024 | N/A |
| 1462 | 30 | Sterling and Lolo Wood LII | July 14, 2024 | N/A |
| 1463 | 31 | Sterling and Carly Aquilino LXXX | July 17, 2024 | N/A |
| 1464 | 32 | Sterling and Carly Aquilino LXXXI | July 17, 2024 | N/A |
| 1465 | 33 | Sterling and Carly Aquilino LXXXII | July 17, 2024 | N/A |
| 1466 | 34 | Sterling and Carly Aquilino LXXXIII | July 17, 2024 | N/A |
| 1467 | 35 | Sterling and Carly Aquilino LXXXIV | July 17, 2024 | N/A |
| 1468 | 36 | Sterling and Carly Aquilino LXXXV | July 17, 2024 | N/A |
| 1469 | 37 | Sterling and Lolo Wood LIII | July 21, 2024 | N/A |
| 1470 | 38 | Sterling and Lolo Wood LIV | July 21, 2024 | N/A |
| 1471 | 39 | Sterling and Lolo Wood LV | July 21, 2024 | N/A |
| 1472 | 40 | Sterling and Lolo Wood LVI | July 21, 2024 | N/A |
| 1473 | 41 | Sterling and Karrueche Tran LXV | July 24, 2024 | N/A |
| 1474 | 42 | Sterling and Karrueche Tran LXVI | July 24, 2024 | N/A |
| 1475 | 43 | Sterling and Karrueche Tran LXVII | July 24, 2024 | N/A |
| 1476 | 44 | Sterling and Karrueche Tran LXVIII | July 24, 2024 | N/A |
| 1477 | 45 | Sterling and Karrueche Tran LXIX | July 24, 2024 | N/A |
| 1478 | 46 | Sterling and Karrueche Tran LXX | July 24, 2024 | N/A |
| 1479 | 47 | Sterling and Lolo Wood LVII | July 28, 2024 | N/A |
| 1480 | 48 | Sterling and Lolo Wood LVIII | July 28, 2024 | N/A |
| 1481 | 49 | Sterling and Lolo Wood LIX | July 28, 2024 | N/A |
| 1482 | 50 | Sterling and Lolo Wood LX | July 28, 2024 | N/A |
| 1483 | 51 | Sterling and Nina Agdal LXX | July 31, 2024 | N/A |
| 1484 | 52 | Sterling and Nina Agdal LXXI | July 31, 2024 | N/A |
| 1485 | 53 | Sterling and Nina Agdal LXXII | July 31, 2024 | N/A |
| 1486 | 54 | Sterling and Nina Agdal LXXIII | July 31, 2024 | N/A |
| 1487 | 55 | Sterling and Nina Agdal LXXIV | July 31, 2024 | N/A |
| 1488 | 56 | Sterling and Nina Agdal LXXV | July 31, 2024 | N/A |
| 1489 | 57 | Sterling and Lolo Wood L | August 4, 2024 | N/A |
| 1490 | 58 | Sterling and Lolo Wood LXII | August 4, 2024 | N/A |
| 1491 | 59 | Sterling and Lolo Wood LXIII | August 4, 2024 | N/A |
| 1492 | 60 | Sterling and Lolo Wood LXIV | August 4, 2024 | N/A |
| 1493 | 61 | Sterling and Rocsi Diaz XXX | August 7, 2024 | N/A |
| 1494 | 62 | Sterling and Rocsi Diaz XXXI | August 7, 2024 | N/A |

=== Season 43 (2024–25) ===
The season premiered on August 11, 2024, with four episodes: Matt Rife, Sterling and Lolo Wood LXVI, Sterling and Lolo Wood LXVII and Sterling and Lolo Wood LXVIII and concluded the first half on December 4, 2024 with Sterling and Lolo Wood CCXX. The second half of the season continued on Wednesday January 29, 2025 with guest Devin Walker, Sterling and Lolo Wood LXXVI, Sterling and Lolo Wood LXXVII, and Sterling and Lolo Wood LXXVIII and concluded on May 21, 2025 with three episodes: Sterling and Lolo Wood CXLVII, Sterling and Lolo Wood CXLVIII and Sterling and Lolo Wood CXLIX.

Notes: Lauren "Lolo" Wood's first episode as permanent co-host on August 11, 2024. This is also the final season for female guest co-hosts, beginning with Season 31.

| No. in series | No. in season | Guest | Original air date | U.S. viewers (millions) |
|---|---|---|---|---|
| 1495 | 1 | Matt Rife | August 11, 2024 | N/A |
| 1496 | 2 | Sterling and Lolo Wood LXVI | August 11, 2024 | N/A |
| 1497 | 3 | Sterling and Lolo Wood LXVII | August 11, 2024 | N/A |
| 1498 | 4 | Sterling and Lolo Wood LXVIII | August 11, 2024 | N/A |
| 1499 | 5 | Sterling and Carly Aquilino LXXXVI | August 14, 2024 | N/A |
| 1500 | 6 | Sterling and Carly Aquilino LXXXVII | August 14, 2024 | N/A |
| 1501 | 7 | Sterling and Lolo Wood LXIX | August 18, 2024 | N/A |
| 1502 | 8 | Sterling and Lolo Wood LXX | August 18, 2024 | N/A |
| 1503 | 9 | Sterling and Lolo Wood LXXI | August 18, 2024 | N/A |
| 1504 | 10 | Sterling and Lolo Wood LXXII | August 18, 2024 | N/A |
| 1505 | 11 | Sterling and Karrueche Tran LXXI | August 21, 2024 | N/A |
| 1506 | 12 | Sterling and Karrueche Tran LXXII | August 21, 2024 | N/A |
| 1507 | 13 | Polo G | August 25, 2024 | N/A |
| 1508 | 14 | Sterling and Lolo Wood XLIX | August 25, 2024 | N/A |
| 1509 | 15 | Sterling and Lolo Wood LXV | August 25, 2024 | N/A |
| 1510 | 16 | Sterling and Lolo Wood LXXIII | August 25, 2024 | N/A |
| 1511 | 17 | Sterling and Nina Agdal LXXVI | August 28, 2024 | N/A |
| 1512 | 18 | Sterling and Nina Agdal LXXVII | August 28, 2024 | N/A |
| 1513 | 19 | Sterling and Lolo Wood LXXIV | September 1, 2024 | N/A |
| 1514 | 20 | Sterling and Lolo Wood LXXV | September 1, 2024 | N/A |
| 1515 | 21 | Sterling and Lolo Wood LXXVI | September 1, 2024 | N/A |
| 1516 | 22 | Sterling and Lolo Wood LXXVII | September 1, 2024 | N/A |
| 1517 | 23 | Sterling and Lolo Wood LXXXI | September 8, 2024 | N/A |
| 1518 | 24 | Sterling and Lolo Wood LXXXII | September 15, 2024 | N/A |
| 1519 | 25 | Sterling and Lolo Wood LXXXIII | September 15, 2024 | N/A |
| 1520 | 26 | Sterling and Lolo Wood LXXXIV | September 15, 2024 | N/A |
| 1521 | 27 | Sterling and Lolo Wood LXXXV | September 15, 2024 | N/A |
| 1522 | 28 | Sterling and Nina Agdal LXXVIII | September 22, 2024 | N/A |
| 1523 | 29 | Sterling and Carly Aquilino LXXXVIII | September 22, 2024 | N/A |
| 1524 | 30 | Sterling and Rocsi Diaz XXXII | September 22, 2024 | N/A |
| 1525 | 31 | Sterling and Kristy Sarah III | September 22, 2024 | N/A |
| 1526 | 32 | Sterling and Carly Aquilino LXXXIX | September 29, 2024 | N/A |
| 1527 | 33 | Sterling and Carly Aquilino XC | September 29, 2024 | N/A |
| 1528 | 34 | Sterling and Rocsi Diaz XXXIII | September 29, 2024 | N/A |
| 1529 | 35 | Sterling and Kristy Sarah IV | September 29, 2024 | N/A |
| 1530 | 36 | Sterling and Carly Aquilino XCI | October 2, 2024 | N/A |
| 1531 | 37 | Sterling and Carly Aquilino XCII | October 2, 2024 | N/A |
| 1532 | 38 | Sterling and Rocsi Diaz XXXIV | October 2, 2024 | N/A |
| 1533 | 39 | Sterling and Kristy Sarah V | October 2, 2024 | N/A |
| 1534 | 40 | Sterling and Carly Aquilino XCIII | October 9, 2024 | N/A |
| 1535 | 41 | Sterling and Carly Aquilino XCIV | October 9, 2024 | N/A |
| 1536 | 42 | Sterling and Kristy Sarah VI | October 9, 2024 | N/A |
| 1537 | 43 | Sterling and Lolo Wood CLXXXVIII | October 16, 2024 | N/A |
| 1538 | 44 | Sterling and Kristy Sarah VII | October 16, 2024 | N/A |
| 1539 | 45 | Sterling and Carly Aquilino XCV | October 16, 2024 | N/A |
| 1540 | 46 | Sterling and Carly Aquilino XCVI | October 23, 2024 | N/A |
| 1541 | 47 | Sterling and Carly Aquilino XCVII | October 23, 2024 | N/A |
| 1542 | 48 | Sterling and Kristy Sarah VIII | October 23, 2024 | N/A |
| 1543 | 49 | Sterling and Kristy Sarah IX | October 30, 2024 | N/A |
| 1544 | 50 | Sterling and Kristy Sarah X | October 30, 2024 | N/A |
| 1545 | 51 | Sterling and Carly Aquilino XCVIII | October 30, 2024 | N/A |
| 1546 | 52 | Sterling and Lolo Wood CCXX | December 4, 2024 | N/A |
| 1547 | 53 | Devin Walker | January 29, 2025 | N/A |
| 1548 | 54 | Sterling and Lolo Wood LXXXVI | January 29, 2025 | N/A |
| 1549 | 55 | Sterling and Lolo Wood LXXXVII | January 29, 2025 | N/A |
| 1550 | 56 | Sterling and Lolo Wood LXXXVIII | January 29, 2025 | N/A |
| 1551 | 57 | Yung Gravy | February 5, 2025 | N/A |
| 1552 | 58 | Sterling and Lolo Wood LXXXIX | February 5, 2025 | N/A |
| 1553 | 59 | Sterling and Lolo Wood XC | February 5, 2025 | N/A |
| 1554 | 60 | Sterling and Lolo Wood XCI | February 5, 2025 | N/A |
| 1555 | 61 | Pauly Shore III | February 12, 2025 | N/A |
| 1556 | 62 | Sterling and Lolo Wood XCII | February 12, 2025 | N/A |
| 1557 | 63 | Sterling and Lolo Wood XCIII | February 12, 2025 | N/A |
| 1558 | 64 | Sterling and Lolo Wood XCIV | February 12, 2025 | N/A |
| 1559 | 65 | Greg McKeown | February 19, 2025 | N/A |
| 1560 | 66 | Sterling and Lolo Wood XCV | February 19, 2025 | N/A |
| 1561 | 67 | Sterling and Lolo Wood XCVI | February 19, 2025 | N/A |
| 1562 | 68 | Sterling and Lolo Wood XCVII | February 19, 2025 | N/A |
| 1563 | 69 | Sterling and Lolo Wood XCVIII | February 26, 2025 | N/A |
| 1564 | 70 | Sterling and Lolo Wood XCIX | February 26, 2025 | N/A |
| 1565 | 71 | Sterling and Lolo Wood C | February 26, 2025 | N/A |
| 1566 | 72 | Sterling and Lolo Wood CI | February 26, 2025 | N/A |
| 1567 | 73 | Sterling and Lolo Wood CII | March 5, 2025 | TBD |
| 1568 | 74 | Sterling and Lolo Wood CIII | March 5, 2025 | TBD |
| 1569 | 75 | Sterling and Lolo Wood CIV | March 5, 2025 | TBD |
| 1570 | 76 | Sterling and Lolo Wood CV | March 5, 2025 | TBD |
| 1571 | 77 | Sterling and Lolo Wood CVI | March 12, 2025 | TBD |
| 1572 | 78 | Sterling and Lolo Wood CVII | March 12, 2025 | TBD |
| 1573 | 79 | Sterling and Lolo Wood CVII | March 12, 2025 | TBD |
| 1574 | 80 | Sterling and Lolo Wood CIX | March 12, 2025 | TBD |
| 1575 | 81 | Sterling and Lolo Wood CX | March 19, 2025 | TBD |
| 1576 | 82 | Sterling and Lolo Wood CXI | March 19, 2025 | TBD |
| 1577 | 83 | Sterling and Lolo Wood CXII | March 19, 2025 | TBD |
| 1578 | 84 | Sterling and Lolo Wood CXIII | March 19, 2025 | TBD |
| 1579 | 85 | Sterling and Lolo Wood CXIV | March 26, 2025 | TBD |
| 1580 | 86 | Sterling and Lolo Wood CXV | March 26, 2025 | TBD |
| 1581 | 87 | Sterling and Lolo Wood CXVI | March 26, 2025 | TBD |
| 1582 | 88 | Sterling and Lolo Wood CXVII | March 26, 2025 | TBD |
| 1583 | 89 | Sterling and Lolo Wood CXVIII | April 2, 2025 | TBD |
| 1584 | 90 | Sterling and Lolo Wood CXIX | April 2, 2025 | TBD |
| 1585 | 91 | Sterling and Lolo Wood CXX | April 2, 2025 | TBD |
| 1586 | 92 | Sterling and Lolo Wood CXXI | April 2, 2025 | TBD |
| 1587 | 93 | Sterling and Lolo Wood CXXII | April 9, 2025 | TBD |
| 1588 | 94 | Sterling and Lolo Wood CXXIII | April 9, 2025 | TBD |
| 1589 | 95 | Sterling and Lolo Wood CXXIV | April 9, 2025 | TBD |
| 1590 | 96 | Sterling and Lolo Wood CXXV | April 9, 2025 | TBD |
| 1591 | 97 | Sterling and Lolo Wood CXXVI | April 16, 2025 | TBD |
| 1592 | 98 | Sterling and Lolo Wood CXXVII | April 16, 2025 | TBD |
| 1593 | 99 | Sterling and Lolo Wood CXXVIII | April 16, 2025 | TBD |
| 1594 | 100 | Sterling and Lolo Wood CXXIX | April 16, 2025 | TBD |
| 1595 | 101 | Sterling and Lolo Wood CXXX | April 23, 2025 | TBD |
| 1596 | 102 | Sterling and Lolo Wood CXXXI | April 23, 2025 | TBD |
| 1597 | 103 | Sterling and Lolo Wood CXXXII | April 23, 2025 | TBD |
| 1598 | 104 | Sterling and Lolo Wood CXXXIII | April 23, 2025 | TBD |
| 1599 | 105 | Sterling and Lolo Wood CXXXIV | April 30, 2025 | TBD |
| 1600 | 106 | Sterling and Lolo Wood CXXXV | April 30, 2025 | TBD |
| 1601 | 107 | Sterling and Lolo Wood CXXXVI | April 30, 2025 | TBD |
| 1602 | 108 | Sterling and Lolo Wood CXXXVII | April 30, 2025 | TBD |
| 1603 | 109 | Sterling and Lolo Wood CXXXVIII | May 7, 2025 | TBD |
| 1604 | 110 | Sterling and Lolo Wood CXXXIX | May 7, 2025 | TBD |
| 1605 | 111 | Sterling and Lolo Wood CXL | May 7, 2025 | TBD |
| 1606 | 112 | Sterling and Lolo Wood CXLI | May 7, 2025 | TBD |
| 1607 | 113 | Greg Tarzan Davis | May 14, 2025 | TBD |
| 1608 | 114 | Sterling and Lolo Wood CXLII | May 14, 2025 | TBD |
| 1609 | 115 | Sterling and Lolo Wood CXLIII | May 14, 2025 | TBD |
| 1610 | 116 | Sterling and Lolo Wood CXLIV | May 14, 2025 | TBD |
| 1611 | 117 | Sterling and Lolo Wood CXLVII | May 21, 2025 | TBD |
| 1612 | 118 | Sterling and Lolo Wood CXLVIII | May 21, 2025 | TBD |
| 1613 | 119 | Sterling and Lolo Wood CXLIX | May 21, 2025 | TBD |

=== Season 44 (2025) ===
The season premiered on May 21, 2025, with three episodes: Sterling and Lolo Wood CL, Sterling and Lolo Wood CLI and Sterling and Lolo Wood CLII.

| No. in series | No. in season | Guest | Original air date | U.S. viewers (millions) |
|---|---|---|---|---|
| 1614 | 1 | Sterling and Lolo Wood CL | May 21, 2025 | TBD |
| 1615 | 2 | Sterling and Lolo Wood CLI | May 21, 2025 | TBD |
| 1616 | 3 | Sterling and Lolo Wood CLII | May 21, 2025 | TBD |
| 1617 | 4 | Sterling and Lolo Wood CLIII | May 28, 2025 | TBD |
| 1618 | 5 | Sterling and Lolo Wood CLIV | May 28, 2025 | TBD |
| 1619 | 6 | Sterling and Lolo Wood CLV | May 28, 2025 | TBD |
| 1620 | 7 | Sterling and Lolo Wood CLVI | May 28, 2025 | TBD |
| 1621 | 8 | Sterling and Lolo Wood CLVII | May 28, 2025 | TBD |
| 1622 | 9 | Sterling and Lolo Wood CLVIII | May 28, 2025 | TBD |
| 1623 | 10 | Matt Rife III | June 4, 2025 | TBD |
| 1624 | 11 | Matt Rife II | June 4, 2025 | TBD |
| 1625 | 12 | Sterling and Lolo Wood CLIX | June 4, 2025 | TBD |
| 1626 | 13 | Sterling and Lolo Wood CLX | June 4, 2025 | TBD |
| 1627 | 14 | Sterling and Lolo Wood CLXI | June 4, 2025 | TBD |
| 1628 | 15 | Sterling and Lolo Wood CLXII | June 4, 2025 | TBD |
| 1629 | 16 | Sterling and Lolo Wood CLXIII | June 11, 2025 | TBD |
| 1630 | 17 | Sterling and Lolo Wood CLXIV | June 11, 2025 | TBD |
| 1631 | 18 | Sterling and Lolo Wood CLXV | June 11, 2025 | TBD |
| 1632 | 19 | Sterling and Lolo Wood CLXVI | June 11, 2025 | TBD |
| 1633 | 20 | Sterling and Lolo Wood CLXVII | June 11, 2025 | TBD |
| 1634 | 21 | Sterling and Lolo Wood CLXVIII | June 11, 2025 | TBD |
| 1635 | 22 | Sterling and Lolo Wood CLXIX | June 18, 2025 | TBD |
| 1636 | 23 | Sterling and Lolo Wood CLXX | June 18, 2025 | TBD |
| 1637 | 24 | Sterling and Lolo Wood CLXXI | June 18, 2025 | TBD |
| 1638 | 25 | Sterling and Lolo Wood CLXXII | June 18, 2025 | TBD |
| 1639 | 26 | Sterling and Lolo Wood CLXXIII | June 18, 2025 | TBD |
| 1640 | 27 | Sterling and Lolo Wood CLXXIV | June 18, 2025 | TBD |
| 1641 | 28 | Sterling and Lolo Wood CLXXV | June 25, 2025 | TBD |
| 1642 | 29 | Sterling and Lolo Wood CLXXVI | June 25, 2025 | TBD |
| 1643 | 30 | Sterling and Lolo Wood CLXXVII | June 25, 2025 | TBD |
| 1644 | 31 | Sterling and Lolo Wood CLXXVIII | June 25, 2025 | TBD |
| 1645 | 32 | Sterling and Lolo Wood CLXXIX | June 25, 2025 | TBD |
| 1646 | 33 | Sterling and Lolo Wood CLXXX | June 25, 2025 | TBD |
| 1647 | 34 | Cara Maria | July 2, 2025 | TBD |
| 1648 | 35 | Tori Deal | July 2, 2025 | TBD |
| 1649 | 36 | Sterling and Lolo Wood CLXXXI | July 2, 2025 | TBD |
| 1650 | 37 | Sterling and Lolo Wood CLXXXII | July 2, 2025 | TBD |
| 1651 | 38 | Sterling and Lolo Wood CLXXXIII | July 2, 2025 | TBD |
| 1652 | 39 | Sterling and Lolo Wood CLXXXIV | July 2, 2025 | TBD |
| 1653 | 40 | Johnny Bananas II | July 9, 2025 | TBD |
| 1654 | 41 | Kam Williams | July 9, 2025 | TBD |
| 1655 | 42 | Sterling and Lolo Wood CLXXXV | July 9, 2025 | TBD |
| 1656 | 43 | Sterling and Lolo Wood CLXXXVI | July 9, 2025 | TBD |
| 1657 | 44 | Sterling and Lolo Wood CLXXXVII | July 9, 2025 | TBD |
| 1658 | 45 | Sterling and Lolo Wood CLXXXIX | July 9, 2025 | TBD |
| 1659 | 46 | CT Tamburello | July 16, 2025 | TBD |
| 1660 | 47 | Aneesa Ferreira | July 16, 2025 | TBD |
| 1661 | 48 | Sterling and Lolo Wood CXC | July 16, 2025 | TBD |

=== Season 45 (2025) ===
The season premiered on July 16, 2025, with three episodes: Sterling and Lolo Wood CXCI, Sterling and Lolo Wood CXCII and Sterling and Lolo Wood CXCIII.

| No. in series | No. in season | Guest | Original air date | U.S. viewers (millions) |
|---|---|---|---|---|
| 1662 | 1 | Sterling and Lolo Wood CXCI | July 16, 2025 | TBD |
| 1663 | 2 | Sterling and Lolo Wood CXCII | July 16, 2025 | TBD |
| 1664 | 3 | Sterling and Lolo Wood CXCIII | July 16, 2025 | TBD |
| 1665 | 4 | CT Tamburello and Johnny Bananas | July 23, 2025 | TBD |
| 1666 | 5 | Sterling and Lolo Wood CXCIV | July 23, 2025 | TBD |
| 1667 | 6 | Sterling and Lolo Wood CXCV | July 23, 2025 | TBD |
| 1668 | 7 | Sterling and Lolo Wood CXCVI | July 23, 2025 | TBD |
| 1669 | 8 | Jill Wagner | August 3, 2025 | TBD |
| 1670 | 9 | LaMonica Garrett | August 3, 2025 | TBD |
| 1671 | 10 | Sterling and Lolo Wood CXCVII | August 3, 2025 | TBD |
| 1672 | 11 | Sterling and Lolo Wood CXCVIII | August 3, 2025 | TBD |
| 1673 | 12 | Sterling and Lolo Wood CXCIX | August 10, 2025 | TBD |
| 1674 | 13 | Sterling and Lolo Wood CC | August 10, 2025 | TBD |
| 1675 | 14 | Sterling and Lolo Wood CCI | August 10, 2025 | TBD |
| 1676 | 15 | Sterling and Lolo Wood CCII | August 10, 2025 | TBD |
| 1677 | 16 | Sterling and Lolo Wood CCIII | August 17, 2025 | TBD |
| 1678 | 17 | Sterling and Lolo Wood CCIV | August 17, 2025 | TBD |
| 1679 | 18 | Sterling and Lolo Wood CCV | August 17, 2025 | TBD |
| 1680 | 19 | Sterling and Lolo Wood CCVI | August 17, 2025 | TBD |
| 1681 | 20 | Sterling and Lolo Wood CCVII | August 24, 2025 | TBD |
| 1682 | 21 | Sterling and Lolo Wood CCVIII | August 24, 2025 | TBD |
| 1683 | 22 | Sterling and Lolo Wood CCIX | August 24, 2025 | TBD |
| 1684 | 23 | Sterling and Lolo Wood CCX | August 24, 2025 | TBD |
| 1685 | 24 | Sterling and Lolo Wood CCXI | August 31, 2025 | TBD |
| 1686 | 25 | Sterling and Lolo Wood CCXII | August 31, 2025 | TBD |
| 1687 | 26 | Sterling and Lolo Wood CCXIII | August 31, 2025 | TBD |
| 1688 | 27 | Sterling and Lolo Wood CCXIV | August 31, 2025 | TBD |
| 1689 | 28 | Sterling and Lolo Wood CCXV | September 14, 2025 | TBD |
| 1690 | 29 | Sterling and Lolo Wood CCXVI | September 14, 2025 | TBD |
| 1691 | 30 | Sterling and Lolo Wood CCXVII | September 14, 2025 | TBD |
| 1692 | 31 | Sterling and Lolo Wood CCXVIII | September 14, 2025 | TBD |
| 1693 | 32 | Sterling and Lolo Wood CCXIX | September 21, 2025 | TBD |
| 1694 | 33 | Sterling and Lolo Wood CCXXI | September 21, 2025 | TBD |
| 1695 | 34 | Sterling and Lolo Wood CCXXII | September 21, 2025 | TBD |
| 1696 | 35 | Sterling and Lolo Wood CCXXIII | September 21, 2025 | TBD |
| 1697 | 36 | Sterling and Lolo Wood CCXXIV | September 28, 2025 | TBD |
| 1698 | 37 | Sterling and Lolo Wood CCXXV | September 28, 2025 | TBD |
| 1699 | 38 | Sterling and Lolo Wood CCXXVI | September 28, 2025 | TBD |
| 1700 | 39 | Sterling and Lolo Wood CCXXVII | September 28, 2025 | TBD |
| 1701 | 40 | Sterling and Lolo Wood CCXXVIII | October 5, 2025 | TBD |
| 1702 | 41 | Sterling and Lolo Wood CCXXIX | October 5, 2025 | TBD |
| 1703 | 42 | Sterling and Lolo Wood CCXXX | October 6, 2025 | TBD |
| 1704 | 43 | Sterling and Lolo Wood CCXXXI | October 6, 2025 | TBD |
| 1704 | 44 | Sterling and Lolo Wood CCXXXII | October 12, 2025 | TBD |

=== Season 46 (2025) ===
The season premiered on October 12, 2025, with three episodes: Sterling and Lolo Wood CCXXXIII, Sterling and Lolo Wood CCXXXIV and Sterling and Lolo Wood CCXXXV.

| No. in series | No. in season | Guest | Original air date | U.S. viewers (millions) |
|---|---|---|---|---|
| 1705 | 1 | Sterling and Lolo Wood CCXXXIII | October 12, 2025 | TBD |
| 1706 | 2 | Sterling and Lolo Wood CCXXXIV | October 13, 2025 | TBD |
| 1707 | 3 | Sterling and Lolo Wood CCXXXV | October 13, 2025 | TBD |
| 1708 | 4 | Sterling and Lolo Wood CCXXXVI | October 19, 2025 | TBD |
| 1709 | 5 | Sterling and Lolo Wood CCXXXVII | October 19, 2025 | TBD |
| 1710 | 6 | Sterling and Lolo Wood CCXXXVIII | October 20, 2025 | TBD |
| 1711 | 7 | Sterling and Lolo Wood CCXXXIX | October 20, 2025 | TBD |
| 1712 | 8 | Sterling and Lolo Wood CCXL | October 22, 2025 | TBD |
| 1713 | 9 | Sterling and Lolo Wood CCXLI | October 22, 2025 | TBD |
| 1714 | 10 | Sterling and Lolo Wood CCXLII | October 22, 2025 | TBD |
| 1715 | 11 | Sterling and Lolo Wood CCXLIII | October 22, 2025 | TBD |
| 1716 | 12 | Sterling and Lolo Wood CCXLIV | October 29, 2025 | TBD |
| 1717 | 13 | Sterling and Lolo Wood CCXLV | October 29, 2025 | TBD |
| 1718 | 14 | Sterling and Lolo Wood CCXLVI | October 29, 2025 | TBD |
| 1719 | 15 | Sterling and Lolo Wood CCXLVII | October 29, 2025 | TBD |
| 1720 | 16 | Sterling and Lolo Wood CCXLVIII | October 29, 2025 | TBD |
| 1721 | 17 | Sterling and Lolo Wood CCXLIX | October 30, 2025 | TBD |
| 1722 | 18 | Sterling and Lolo Wood CCL | October 30, 2025 | TBD |
| 1723 | 19 | Sterling and Lolo Wood CCLI | October 30, 2025 | TBD |
| 1724 | 20 | Sterling and Lolo Wood CCLII | November 5, 2025 | TBD |
| 1725 | 21 | Sterling and Lolo Wood CCLIII | November 5, 2025 | TBD |
| 1726 | 22 | Sterling and Lolo Wood CCLIV | November 5, 2025 | TBD |
| 1727 | 23 | Sterling and Lolo Wood CCLV | November 5, 2025 | TBD |
| 1728 | 24 | Sterling and Lolo Wood CCLVI | November 5, 2025 | TBD |
| 1729 | 25 | Sterling and Lolo Wood CCLVII | November 6, 2025 | TBD |
| 1730 | 26 | Sterling and Lolo Wood CCLVIII | November 6, 2025 | TBD |
| 1731 | 27 | Sterling and Lolo Wood CCLIX | November 6, 2025 | TBD |

=== Season 47 (2025) ===
The season premiered on November 10, 2025, with six episodes: Sterling and Lolo Wood CCCXVIII, Sterling and Lolo Wood CCCXIX, Sterling and Lolo Wood CCCXX, Sterling and Lolo Wood CCCXXI, Sterling and Lolo Wood CCCXXII and Sterling and Lolo Wood CCCXXIII.

| No. in series | No. in season | Guest | Original air date | U.S. viewers (millions) |
|---|---|---|---|---|
| 1732 | 1 | Sterling and Lolo Wood CCCXVIII | November 10, 2025 | TBD |
| 1733 | 2 | Sterling and Lolo Wood CCCXIX | November 10, 2025 | TBD |
| 1734 | 3 | Sterling and Lolo Wood CCCXX | November 10, 2025 | TBD |
| 1735 | 4 | Sterling and Lolo Wood CCCXXI | November 10, 2025 | TBD |
| 1736 | 5 | Sterling and Lolo Wood CCCXXII | November 10, 2025 | TBD |
| 1737 | 6 | Sterling and Lolo Wood CCCXXIII | November 10, 2025 | TBD |
| 1738 | 7 | Sterling and Lolo Wood CCLX | November 12, 2025 | TBD |
| 1738 | 8 | Sterling and Lolo Wood CCLX | November 12, 2025 | TBD |
| 1739 | 9 | Sterling and Lolo Wood CCLXI | November 12, 2025 | TBD |
| 1740 | 10 | Sterling and Lolo Wood CCLXII | November 12, 2025 | TBD |
| 1741 | 11 | Sterling and Lolo Wood CCLXIII | November 12, 2025 | TBD |
| 1742 | 12 | Sterling and Lolo Wood CCLXIV | November 12, 2025 | TBD |
| 1743 | 13 | Sterling and Lolo Wood CCLXV | November 13, 2025 | TBD |
| 1744 | 14 | Sterling and Lolo Wood CCLXVI | November 13, 2025 | TBD |
| 1745 | 15 | Sterling and Lolo Wood CCLXVII | November 13, 2025 | TBD |
| 1746 | 16 | Sterling and Lolo Wood CCCXXIV | November 17, 2025 | TBD |
| 1747 | 17 | Sterling and Lolo Wood CCCXXV | November 17, 2025 | TBD |
| 1748 | 18 | Sterling and Lolo Wood CCCXXVI | November 17, 2025 | TBD |
| 1749 | 19 | Sterling and Lolo Wood CCCXXVII | November 17, 2025 | TBD |
| 1750 | 20 | Sterling and Lolo Wood CCCXXVIII | November 17, 2025 | TBD |
| 1751 | 21 | Sterling and Lolo Wood CCCXXIX | November 17, 2025 | TBD |
| 1752 | 22 | Sterling and Lolo Wood CCLXVIII | November 19, 2025 | TBD |
| 1753 | 23 | Sterling and Lolo Wood CCLXIX | November 19, 2025 | TBD |
| 1754 | 24 | Sterling and Lolo Wood CCLXX | November 19, 2025 | TBD |
| 1755 | 25 | Sterling and Lolo Wood CCLXXI | November 19, 2025 | TBD |
| 1756 | 26 | Sterling and Lolo Wood CCLXXII | November 19, 2025 | TBD |
| 1757 | 27 | Sterling and Lolo Wood CCLXXIII | November 20, 2025 | TBD |

=== Season 48 (2025) ===
The season premiered on November 20, 2025, with two episodes: Sterling and Lolo Wood CCLXXIV and Sterling and Lolo Wood CCLXXV.

| No. in series | No. in season | Guest | Original air date | U.S. viewers (millions) |
|---|---|---|---|---|
| 1758 | 1 | Sterling and Lolo Wood CCLXXIV | November 20, 2025 | TBD |
| 1759 | 2 | Sterling and Lolo Wood CCLXXV | November 20, 2025 | TBD |
| 1760 | 3 | Sterling and Lolo Wood CCCXXX | November 24, 2025 | TBD |
| 1761 | 4 | Sterling and Lolo Wood CCCXXXI | November 24, 2025 | TBD |
| 1762 | 5 | Sterling and Lolo Wood CCCXXXII | November 24, 2025 | TBD |
| 1763 | 6 | Sterling and Lolo Wood CCCXXXIII | November 24, 2025 | TBD |
| 1764 | 7 | Sterling and Lolo Wood CCCXXXIV | November 24, 2025 | TBD |
| 1765 | 8 | Sterling and Lolo Wood CCCXXXV | November 24, 2025 | TBD |
| 1766 | 9 | Sterling and Lolo Wood CCLXXVI | November 26, 2025 | TBD |
| 1767 | 10 | Sterling and Lolo Wood CCLXXVII | November 26, 2025 | TBD |
| 1768 | 11 | Sterling and Lolo Wood CCLXXVII | November 26, 2025 | TBD |
| 1769 | 12 | Sterling and Lolo Wood CCLXXIX | November 26, 2025 | TBD |
| 1740 | 13 | Sterling and Lolo Wood CCLXXX | November 26, 2025 | TBD |
| 1741 | 14 | Sterling and Lolo Wood CCLXXXI | November 27, 2025 | TBD |
| 1742 | 15 | Sterling and Lolo Wood CCLXXXII | November 27, 2025 | TBD |
| 1743 | 16 | Sterling and Lolo Wood CCLXXXIII | November 27, 2025 | TBD |
| 1744 | 17 | Sterling and Lolo Wood CCCXXXVI | December 1, 2025 | TBD |
| 1745 | 18 | Sterling and Lolo Wood CCCXXXVII | December 1, 2025 | TBD |
| 1746 | 19 | Sterling and Lolo Wood CCCXXXVIII | December 1, 2025 | TBD |
| 1747 | 20 | Sterling and Lolo Wood CCCXXXIX | December 1, 2025 | TBD |
| 1748 | 21 | Sterling and Lolo Wood CCCXL | December 1, 2025 | TBD |
| 1749 | 22 | Sterling and Lolo Wood CCCXLI | December 1, 2025 | TBD |
| 1750 | 23 | Sterling and Lolo Wood CCLXXXIV | December 3, 2025 | TBD |
| 1751 | 24 | Sterling and Lolo Wood CCLXXXV | December 3, 2025 | TBD |
| 1752 | 25 | Sterling and Lolo Wood CCLXXXVI | December 3, 2025 | TBD |
| 1753 | 26 | Sterling and Lolo Wood CCLXXXVII | December 3, 2025 | TBD |
| 1754 | 27 | Sterling and Lolo Wood CCLXXXVIII | December 3, 2025 | TBD |
| 1755 | 28 | Sterling and Lolo Wood CCLXXXIX | December 4, 2025 | TBD |
| 1756 | 29 | Sterling and Lolo Wood CCXC | December 4, 2025 | TBD |
| 1757 | 30 | Sterling and Lolo Wood CCXCI | December 4, 2025 | TBD |
| 1758 | 31 | Sterling and Lolo Wood CCCXLII | December 8, 2025 | TBD |
| 1759 | 32 | Sterling and Lolo Wood CCCXLIII | December 8, 2025 | TBD |
| 1760 | 33 | Sterling and Lolo Wood CCCXLIV | December 8, 2025 | TBD |
| 1761 | 34 | Sterling and Lolo Wood CCCXLV | December 8, 2025 | TBD |
| 1762 | 35 | Sterling and Lolo Wood CCCXLVI | December 8, 2025 | TBD |
| 1763 | 36 | Sterling and Lolo Wood CCCXLVII | December 8, 2025 | TBD |
| 1764 | 37 | Sterling and Lolo Wood CCXCII | December 10, 2025 | TBD |
| 1765 | 38 | Sterling and Lolo Wood CCXCIII | December 10, 2025 | TBD |
| 1766 | 39 | Sterling and Lolo Wood CCXCIV | December 10, 2025 | TBD |
| 1767 | 40 | Sterling and Lolo Wood CCXCV | December 10, 2025 | TBD |
| 1768 | 41 | Sterling and Lolo Wood CCXCVI | December 10, 2025 | TBD |
| 1769 | 42 | Sterling and Lolo Wood CCXCVII | December 11, 2025 | TBD |
| 1770 | 43 | Sterling and Lolo Wood CCXCVIII | December 11, 2025 | TBD |
| 1771 | 44 | Sterling and Lolo Wood CCXCIX | December 11, 2025 | TBD |
| 1772 | 45 | Sterling and Lolo Wood CCCXLVIII | December 15, 2025 | TBD |
| 1773 | 46 | Sterling and Lolo Wood CCCXLIX | December 15, 2025 | TBD |
| 1774 | 47 | Sterling and Lolo Wood CCCL | December 15, 2025 | TBD |
| 1775 | 48 | Sterling and Lolo Wood CCCLI | December 15, 2025 | TBD |
| 1776 | 49 | Sterling and Lolo Wood CCCLII | December 15, 2025 | TBD |
| 1777 | 50 | Sterling and Lolo Wood CCC | December 15, 2025 | TBD |
| 1778 | 51 | Sterling and Lolo Wood CCCXI | December 15, 2025 | TBD |
| 1779 | 52 | Sterling and Lolo Wood CCCI | December 17, 2025 | TBD |
| 1780 | 53 | Sterling and Lolo Wood CCCII | December 17, 2025 | TBD |
| 1781 | 54 | Sterling and Lolo Wood CCCIII | December 17, 2025 | TBD |
| 1782 | 55 | Sterling and Lolo Wood CCCIV | December 17, 2025 | TBD |
| 1783 | 56 | Sterling and Lolo Wood CCCV | December 17, 2025 | TBD |
| 1784 | 57 | Sterling and Lolo Wood CCCVI | December 18, 2025 | TBD |
| 1785 | 58 | Sterling and Lolo Wood CCCVII | December 18, 2025 | TBD |
| 1786 | 59 | Sterling and Lolo Wood CCCVIII | December 18, 2025 | TBD |

=== Season 49 (2026) ===
This will be the final season of Ridiculousness, as it was announced on October 31, 2025 that the show had been cancelled.

| No. in series | No. in season | Guest | Original air date | U.S. viewers (millions) |
|---|---|---|---|---|
| 1787 | 1 | Sterling and Lolo Wood CCCLIII | February 11, 2026 | TBD |
| 1788 | 2 | Sterling and Lolo Wood CCCLIV | February 11, 2026 | TBD |
| 1789 | 3 | Sterling and Lolo Wood CCCLV | February 11, 2026 | TBD |
| 1790 | 4 | Sterling and Lolo Wood CCCLVI | February 11, 2026 | TBD |
| 1791 | 5 | Sterling and Lolo Wood CCCLVII | February 18, 2026 | TBD |
| 1792 | 6 | Sterling and Lolo Wood CCCLVIII | February 18, 2026 | TBD |
| 1793 | 7 | Sterling and Lolo Wood CCCLIX | February 18, 2026 | TBD |
| 1794 | 8 | Sterling and Lolo Wood CCCLX | February 18, 2026 | TBD |
| 1795 | 9 | Sterling and Lolo Wood CCCLXI | February 25, 2026 | TBD |
| 1796 | 10 | Sterling and Lolo Wood CCCLXII | February 25, 2026 | TBD |
| 1797 | 11 | Sterling and Lolo Wood CCCLXII | February 25, 2026 | TBD |
| 1798 | 12 | Sterling and Lolo Wood CCCLXIII | February 25, 2026 | TBD |
| 1799 | 13 | Sterling and Lolo Wood CCCLXV | March 4, 2026 | TBD |
| 1800 | 14 | Sterling and Lolo Wood CCCLXVI | March 4, 2026 | TBD |
| 1801 | 15 | Sterling and Lolo Wood CCCLXVII | March 4, 2026 | TBD |
| 1802 | 16 | Sterling and Lolo Wood CCCLXVIII | February 25, 2026 | TBD |
| 1803 | 17 | Sterling and Lolo Wood CCCLXIX | March 11, 2026 | TBD |
| 1804 | 18 | Sterling and Lolo Wood CCCLXX | March 11, 2026 | TBD |
| 1805 | 19 | Sterling and Lolo Wood CCCLXXI | March 18, 2026 | TBD |
| 1806 | 20 | Sterling and Lolo Wood CCCLXXII | March 18, 2026 | TBD |
| 1807 | 21 | Sterling and Lolo Wood CCCLXXIII | March 25, 2026 | TBD |
| 1808 | 22 | Sterling and Lolo Wood CCCLXXIV | March 25, 2026 | TBD |

=== Specials ===
| No. in series | Title | Guest | Original air date | U.S. viewers (millions) |
|---|---|---|---|---|
| 1 | The Ridiculousness Top 10 Super Show | None | September 3, 2012 | N/A |
| 2 | Best of the Guests | None | April 25, 2013 | N/A |
| 3 | A Very Merry Ridiculousness | Santa Claus | November 29, 2013 | N/A |
| 4 | Super Party | None | March 3, 2016 | N/A |
| 5 | Sports Spectacular | None | March 10, 2016 | N/A |
| 6 | Love, Hugs, & Slams | None | April 7, 2016 | N/A |
| 7 | Family Style | None | May 5, 2016 | N/A |
| 8 | Grossest Episode Ever | None | May 12, 2017 | N/A |
| 9 | Ridic Remix | Alanar | June 9, 2017 | N/A |
| 10 | Summer Vacation | None | June 15, 2017 | N/A |
| 11 | The Ridickys | None | September 1, 2017 | N/A |
| 12 | Kidiculousness | None | September 15, 2017 | N/A |
| 13 | The Happy Everything Episode | None | December 1, 2017 | N/A |
| 14 | Snowdiculousness | None | December 1, 2017 | N/A |
| 15 | Ri-Chick-ulousness | None | December 1, 2017 | N/A |
| 16 | Nerdiculousness | Meghan Deanna Smith | December 8, 2017 | N/A |
| 17 | Bro-diculousness | None | December 8, 2017 | N/A |
| 18 | Red, White and Bluediculousness | None | January 5, 2018 | N/A |
| 19 | Highdiculousness | None | January 12, 2018 | N/A |
| 20 | Rockdiculousness | Steel Panther | January 12, 2018 | N/A |
| 21 | The Ridiculousness 500 | None | January 19, 2018 | N/A |
| 22 | VMA Moments | None | August 17, 2019 | N/A |
| 23 | VMA Awards | None | August 23, 2019 | N/A |
| 24 | Grossness | None | February 10, 2020 | N/A |
| 25 | Grossness II | None | February 11, 2020 | N/A |
| 26 | WTFness | None | February 12, 2020 | N/A |
| 27 | WTFness II | None | February 13, 2020 | N/A |
| 28 | Bustedness | Mike Majlak | May 6, 2020 | 0.29 |
| 29 | Bustedness II | Mike Majlak | May 7, 2020 | 0.18 |

== See also ==
- List of Ridiculousness episodes (season 1–20)
