= Niemożliwe Made In Poland =

- Genre: Clip show Comedy
- Starring: Wojciech Łozowski; Tomasz Torres; Paula Tumala (series 1); Katarzyna Pytel (series 2-present)
- Country of origin: Poland
- Original language: Polish
- No. of seasons: 2
- No. of episodes: 30

Production
- Executive producer: Maria Czech
- Running time: 22-24 minutes
- Production companies: LCPC La Competencia (2016); Future Gate (2017)

Original release
- Network: MTV Poland
- Release: September 11, 2016 – September 1, 2019

Niemożliwe Made In Poland is a Polish comedy clip show that began airing on September 11, 2016. It features various viral videos from the Internet, usually involving failed do-it-yourself attempts at stunts, to which Wojciech Łozowski and his panelists add mock commentary. The Polish Ridiculousness producers, as well as the show's network, MTV Poland, do not accept viewer submissions and air a disclaimer before and after each episode warning that, because of the dangerous nature of the stunts being shown, any attempts to submit a video to the show will be discarded sight unseen. This is the Polish spin-off of the American show Ridiculousness.

== Production ==
In August 2016, MTV Poland confirmed a new show Niemożliwe Made in Poland which premiered on September 11, 2016. The show is presented by Wojciech "Łozo" Łozowski and co-hosted by Tomasz Torres and Paula Tumala.

On July 10, 2019, Niemożliwe Made in Poland was renewed for a fifteen episode second season, which was produced in 2017. It premiered on August 25, 2019, and included a new co-host Katarzyna Pytel who replaced a former co-host Paula Tumala.

== Episodes ==
=== Season 1 (2016) ===
No. overall	No. in season	Title	Original release date
1	1	"Vienio"	11 September 2016
2	2	"Andrzej Wrona"	18 September 2016
3	3	"Marta Wierzbicka"	25 September 2016
4	4	"Alan Andersz"	2 October 2016
5	5	"Karolina Gilon"	9 October 2016
6	6	"Dawid Kwiatkowski"	16 October 2016
7	7	"Andrzej Wrona II"	23 October 2016
8	8	"Marta Wierzbicka II"	30 October 2016
9	9	"Alan Andersz II"	13 November 2016
10	10	"Karolina Gilon II"	20 November 2016
11	11	"Dawid Kwiatkowski II"	27 November 2016
12	12	"Vienio II"	4 December 2016
13	13	"Marta Wierzbicka III"	11 December 2016
14	14	"Alan Andersz III"	18 December 2016
15	15	"Best Of"	25 December 2016

=== Season 2 (2019) ===
No. overall	No. in season	Title	Original release date
16	1	"Michał Koterski"	25 August 2019
17	2	"Aleksander Milwiw-Baron"	25 August 2019
18	3	"Joanna Jędrzejczyk"	25 August 2019
19	4	"Michał Piróg"	25 August 2019
20	5	"Odeta Moro"	26 August 2019
21	6	"Człowiek Warga"	26 August 2019
22	7	"Honorata Skarbek"	31 August 2019
23	8	"Łukasz Jakóbiak"	31 August 2019
24	9	"Adam Fidusiewicz"	31 August 2019
25	10	"Joanna Opozda"	31 August 2019
26	11	"Sławomir Uniatowski"	1 September 2019
27	12	"Robert Burneika"	1 September 2019
28	13	"Grzegorz Hyży"	1 September 2019
29	14	"Andrzej Wrona III"	1 September 2019
30	15	"Best Of"	1 September 2019
