= Ridiculousness =

American comedy TV series

- Genre: Clip show; Comedy; Cringe comedy
- Created by: Jeff Tremaine; Rob Dyrdek; Shane Nickerson
- Directed by: Michael A. Simon
- Presented by: Rob Dyrdek; Sterling "Steelo" Brim; Chanel West Coast; Lauren "Lolo" Wood
- Theme music composer: Mark Mothersbaugh
- Opening theme: "Uncontrollable Urge"; created by Devo; performed by Rob Dyrdek
- Country of origin: United States
- Original language: English
- No. of seasons: 49
- No. of episodes: 1,808 (list of episodes)

Production
- Executive producers: Christian Duguay; Jeff Tremaine; Kristina Edwards; Lauren Dolgen; Michelle Klepper; Rob Dyrdek; Sara Cohen; Shane Nickerson; Sterling Brim; Matt Harris
- Running time: 22 minutes
- Production companies: Four Down Productions; Dickhouse Productions; Superjacket Productions; Paramount Television Studios (Note: Credited as MTV Series Development in Season 1; known as MTV Production Development from Season 2 until Season 6, and as MTV Entertainment Studios from season 7 to season 44.); Gorilla Flicks; Thrill One Media

Original release
- Network: MTV
- Release: August 29, 2011 – present

Related
- Amazingness; Deliciousness; Adorableness; Messyness

Ridiculousness is an American comedy clip show that began airing on August 29, 2011, on MTV. It is hosted by Rob Dyrdek and co-hosted by Sterling "Steelo" Brim, Chanel West Coast (seasons 1–30) and Lauren "Lolo" Wood (seasons 31–48). Ridiculousness strictly showcases various viral videos from the Internet, usually involving failed do-it-yourself attempts at stunts, to which Dyrdek and his panelists add mockery and reaction. The producers of the series and MTV refuse any submitted videos for the show for the safety of their viewers (as mentioned in disclaimers at the beginning and end of each episode), instead licensing already-existing content.

== Production ==
On September 11, 2012, Ridiculousness was renewed for a 20-episode third season. It premiered on February 14, 2013, and included a crossover with Jersey Shore when Pauly D guest-starred. The season took a hiatus from April 2013 to July 18, 2013. Season 3 averaged a 1.6 P12-34 rating and is the No.1 original cable series in its time slot with P12-34.

The series is produced by Superjacket Productions, Rob Dyrdek's production company, under a multi-year deal with MTV.

The theme song, a cover of Devo's "Uncontrollable Urge", was done along with Devo member Mark Mothersbaugh, with Dyrdek providing the "yeah"s. Music supervisor Ben Hochstein said that "Kids think the song is original to our show and have never heard of Devo, but hopefully, their parents appreciate the connection."

Due to the series being consistently marathoned on MTV and MTV2, beginning in October 2015, some episodes of Ridiculousness were repackaged with lower-cost production music. The new music was under blanket licenses overlaying the former tracks. The former tracks would have required MTV to pay music licensing fees to artists.

In 2023, after co-hosting 30 seasons of the series, Chanel West Coast left the show to pursue her solo career. The West Coast Hustle, a reality TV series about the former co-host, premiered on MTV on July 18, 2024. After Chanel West Coast's departure, several guest co-hosts were tried out, and eventually Lauren "Lolo" Wood became part of the cast.

The show's cancellation was confirmed on October 31, 2025, one of many changes made under MTV's new Skydance ownership, with the show's final episodes to air some time in 2026.

== Episodes ==
Season	Episodes	Originally released	
Season	Episodes	First released	Last released
1	16	August 29, 2011	December 19, 2011
2	20	April 30, 2012	November 5, 2012
3	20	February 14, 2013	September 19, 2013
4	21	January 2, 2014	April 3, 2014
5	18	July 10, 2014	October 30, 2014
6	32	January 1, 2015	June 25, 2015
7	30	October 8, 2015	June 30, 2016
8	30	July 7, 2016	September 27, 2016
9	30	January 20, 2017	June 22, 2017
10	30	September 1, 2017	January 26, 2018
11	41	August 5, 2018	October 12, 2018
12	43	October 19, 2018	February 13, 2019
13	41	February 17, 2019	May 10, 2019
14	42	May 17, 2019	September 6, 2019
15	39	September 7, 2019	December 29, 2019
16	43	January 6, 2020	March 11, 2020
17	41	April 20, 2020	September 14, 2020
18	43	September 15, 2020	November 19, 2020
19	42	November 30, 2020	January 28, 2021
20	42	February 8, 2021	April 18, 2021
21	42	April 23, 2021	July 18, 2021
22	42	July 30, 2021	October 1, 2021
23	58	October 8, 2021	January 7, 2022
24	28	January 14, 2022	March 11, 2022
25	42	March 18, 2022	May 18, 2022
26	39	May 20, 2022	June 22, 2022
27	31	June 22, 2022	August 10, 2022
28	37	August 12, 2022	October 7, 2022
29	58	October 7, 2022	January 16, 2023
30	43	January 16, 2023	March 29, 2023
31	8	April 3, 2023	April 12, 2023
32	22	April 17, 2023	May 8, 2023
33	85	May 8, 2023	July 7, 2023
34	24	July 7, 2023	July 24, 2023
35	68	July 28, 2023	September 25, 2023
36	31	September 25, 2023	October 30, 2023
37	33	November 3, 2023	December 22, 2023
38	51	December 22, 2023	April 14, 2024
39	4	April 14, 2024	April 21, 2024
40	20	April 21, 2024	May 26, 2024
41	12	June 2, 2024	June 16, 2024
42	62	June 23, 2024	August 7, 2024
43	119	August 11, 2024	May 21, 2025
44	48	May 21, 2025	July 18, 2025
45	44	July 18, 2025	October 12, 2025
46	27	October 12, 2025	November 6, 2025
47	27	November 10, 2025	November 20, 2025
48	59	November 20, 2025	December 18, 2025
49	TBA	February 11, 2026	TBA

== Reception ==
In 2016, a New York Times study of the 50 TV shows with the most Facebook Likes found that Ridiculousness "is most popular in rural Alaska, New Mexico and Montana, and least popular in Washington, D.C., Atlanta and San Francisco".

== Scheduling ==
By 2020, many journalists and media commentators noted that the series frequently occupied a great majority of MTV's programming lineup. In September 2020, John Gonzalez of The Ringer observed that the network often schedules marathon repeats of Ridiculousness that span multiple days, including one 36-hour period in August 2020 when MTV broadcast nothing else except episodes of the show. He speculated the show's success could be attributed to its "lowbrow content" and "familiar and formulaic" structure.

That same year, Michael Schneider and Kate Aurthur of Variety reported that reruns of Ridiculousness were broadcast for 113 of 168 total hours (67.3%) during one week in June 2020. They attributed its ubiquity to media companies, such as ViacomCBS, prioritizing streaming content at the expense of their linear television networks. In response, MTV released a statement saying that the television network was "just a single sliver" of their overall operations, and that an array of programming was being developed for other mediums, and Tanya Giles, a ViacomCBS executive, said that the show was prioritized on the schedule as "escapist" entertainment with wide appeal for viewers at home during the COVID-19 pandemic. Contrary to that statement, as of May 2022, its repeats continue to make up a majority of the network's weekly schedule, with an unofficial Twitter account compiling the network's schedule showing the extent of MTV's dependence on the series to fill its broadcast week.

In November 2020, Adam Buckman of MediaPost also wrote about the show's prominence on MTV, and reached similar conclusions to its cause as Schneider and Aurthur. Buckman called it "an abuse of the end-user that today's low-rent cable TV channels presumably wish to reach -- i.e., cable subscribers at home who pay steep fees every month for dozens of name-brand cable channels that seem to have abandoned the idea of developing and producing original, attractive content worth paying for."

== Spin-offs ==
=== Amazingness ===
Amazingness premiered on MTV on December 8, 2017, and ended on January 19, 2018. Presented by Rob Dyrdek, with Chris "Drama" Pfaff, Eddie Huang and Krystal Bee. Every episode features six contestants showcasing their unique talents. After each performance, the judges decide who moves on and who is eliminated. The last performer standing is awarded $10,000.

=== Deliciousness ===
MTV greenlit Deliciousness on November 23, 2020 and the series later premiered on December 14, 2020. It is hosted by Tiffani Thiessen, with Angela Kinsey, Kel Mitchell and Tim Chantarangsu.

=== Adorableness ===
On June 21, 2021, MTV greenlit Adorableness, hosted by James Davis, with Alyson Hannigan, Ross Mathews and Dulcé Sloan. The series premiered on July 19, 2021.

=== Messyness ===
On June 4, 2021, MTV greenlit Messyness, hosted by Nicole "Snooki" Polizzi, with Tori Spelling, Adam Rippon and Teddy Ray. The series premiered on August 23, 2021.

== International versions ==
Country	Channel	Title	Year	Reference	Hosted by
Chile	Canal 13	Ridículos Chile	2015–2016		Luis Fernando Flores Alvarado
France	MTV France	Ridiculous Made In France	2016–		Jean-Baptiste Goupil
Spain	MTV Spain	Vergüenza Ajena: Made in Spain	2016–		Luiz Fernández
Brazil	MTV Brasil	Ridículos MTV	2016–		Felipe Titto
South Africa	MTV Africa (Simulcasts on MTV Base Africa)	Ridiculousness África	2016–		Thomas Gumede
Mexico	MTV Latin America	Ridículos MTV	2016–		Fred Lammie
Sweden	MTV Sweden	Ridiculousness Sverige	2016–		Erik Ekstrand
Poland	MTV Poland	Niemożliwe Made In Poland	2016–		Wojciech Łozowski; Tomaza Torrez; Paula Tumala (series 1); Katarzyna Pytel (series 2-)
Netherlands Belgium	MTV Netherlands	Dutch Ridiculousness	2016–		Edson da Graça
Italy	MTV Italy	Ridiculousness Italia	2016–2017		Stefano Corti
Denmark	MTV Denmark	Ridiculousness Danmark	2017–		Unknown
Middle East	Comedy Central Arabia	Ridiculousness Arabia	2017		Mohanad AlHattab
Israel	MTV Israel	שרוטים: מייד אין ישראל (Ridiculousness: made in Israel)	2018		
