= List of Ridiculousness episodes (seasons 1–20) =

Ridiculousness is an American comedy clip show that began airing on August 29, 2011. It is hosted by Rob Dyrdek and co-hosted by Steelo Brim and Chanel West Coast. Some episodes feature a celebrity special guest. Ridiculousness shows various viral videos from the Internet, usually involving failed do-it-yourself attempts at stunts, to which Rob and his panelists add mock commentary. Although the format bears some similarity to viewer-submission driven shows such as America's Funniest Home Videos, Ridiculousness producers, as well as the show's network, MTV, do not accept viewer submissions and air a disclaimer before and after each episode warning that, because of the dangerous nature of the stunts being shown, any attempts to submit a video to the show will not be considered.

== Series overview ==
Season	Episodes	Originally released	
Season	Episodes	First released	Last released
1	16	August 29, 2011	December 19, 2011
2	20	April 30, 2012	November 5, 2012
3	20	February 14, 2013	September 19, 2013
4	21	January 2, 2014	April 3, 2014
5	18	July 10, 2014	October 30, 2014
6	32	January 1, 2015	June 25, 2015
7	30	October 8, 2015	June 30, 2016
8	30	July 7, 2016	September 27, 2016
9	30	January 20, 2017	June 22, 2017
10	30	September 1, 2017	January 26, 2018
11	41	August 5, 2018	October 12, 2018
12	43	October 19, 2018	February 13, 2019
13	41	February 17, 2019	May 10, 2019
14	42	May 17, 2019	September 6, 2019
15	39	September 7, 2019	December 29, 2019
16	43	January 6, 2020	March 11, 2020
17	41	April 20, 2020	September 14, 2020
18	43	September 15, 2020	November 19, 2020
19	42	November 30, 2020	January 28, 2021
20	42	February 8, 2021	April 18, 2021
21	42	April 23, 2021	July 18, 2021
22	42	July 30, 2021	October 1, 2021
23	58	October 8, 2021	January 7, 2022
24	28	January 14, 2022	March 11, 2022
25	42	March 18, 2022	May 18, 2022
26	39	May 20, 2022	June 22, 2022
27	31	June 22, 2022	August 10, 2022
28	37	August 12, 2022	October 7, 2022
29	58	October 7, 2022	January 16, 2023
30	43	January 16, 2023	March 29, 2023
31	8	April 3, 2023	April 12, 2023
32	22	April 17, 2023	May 8, 2023
33	85	May 8, 2023	July 7, 2023
34	24	July 7, 2023	July 24, 2023
35	68	July 28, 2023	September 25, 2023
36	31	September 25, 2023	October 30, 2023
37	33	November 3, 2023	December 22, 2023
38	51	December 22, 2023	April 14, 2024
39	4	April 14, 2024	April 21, 2024
40	20	April 21, 2024	May 26, 2024
41	12	June 2, 2024	June 16, 2024
42	62	June 23, 2024	August 7, 2024
43	119	August 11, 2024	May 21, 2025
44	48	May 21, 2025	July 18, 2025
45	44	July 18, 2025	October 12, 2025
46	27	October 12, 2025	November 6, 2025
47	27	November 10, 2025	November 20, 2025
48	59	November 20, 2025	December 18, 2025
49	TBA	February 11, 2026	TBA

== Episodes ==
=== Season 1 (2011) ===
No. in series	No. in season	Guest	Original air date	U.S. viewers (millions)
1	1	Ryan O'Malley (Note: Indicates that the guest only appears for one segment.)	August 29, 2011	3.14
2	2	Johnny Knoxville	September 5, 2011	1.74
3	3	Christopher Boykin	September 12, 2011	1.77
4	4	Travis Pastrana	September 19, 2011	1.41
5	5	The Dingo	September 26, 2011	1.28
6	6	Matthew Mounce	October 3, 2011	1.89
7	7	Jeff Tremaine	October 17, 2011	1.43
8	8	Matt Schlager (Note: Catie Upton fills-in for Chanel West Coast in these episodes.)	October 24, 2011	1.57
9	9	Chris "Drama" Pfaff	October 31, 2011	1.01
10	10	Judd Leffew	November 7, 2011	1.18
11	11	Biker Fox	November 14, 2011	1.43
12	12	Dan Heaton	November 21, 2011	1.39
13	13	Ryan Dunn (Posthumous)	November 28, 2011	1.50
14	14	Cole Hernandez	December 5, 2011	1.34
15	15	The Dingo II	December 12, 2011	1.47
16	16	Christopher Boykin II	December 19, 2011	1.52

Ending Segment: "The Ultimate Search" - At the end of each episode, Rob would search for a random video on Bing.

=== Season 2 (2012) ===
Note: This season has a new stage setting along with a new laptop stage.

No. in series	No. in season	Guest	Original air date	U.S. viewers (millions)
17	1	Justin Bieber	April 30, 2012	1.64
18	2	Floyd Mayweather Jr.	May 7, 2012	1.19
19	3	Sara Jean Underwood	May 14, 2012	1.39
20	4	Quinton "Rampage" Jackson	May 21, 2012	1.21
21	5	Duff Goldman	May 28, 2012	1.33
22	6	Jason Ellis	June 7, 2012	N/A
23	7	Chanel and Sterling	June 7, 2012	1.24
24	8	Streetbike Tommy	June 14, 2012	1.25
25	9	Lil Jon	August 20, 2012	1.60
26	10	Tyler the Creator & Taco Bennett	August 27, 2012	1.10
27	11	Wiz Khalifa	September 3, 2012	1.34
28	12	Katerina Graham	September 10, 2012	1.04
29	13	Vaughn Gittin Jr.	September 17, 2012	0.73
30	14	Chris Cole	September 24, 2012	0.79
31	15	Big Cat	October 1, 2012	0.95
32	16	The Bella Twins	October 8, 2012	0.84
33	17	Chanel and Sterling II	October 15, 2012	1.22
34	18	TJ Lavin	October 22, 2012	1.04
35	19	Gene & Pat Dyrdek	October 29, 2012	1.13
36	20	Jason Acuña & Preston Lacy	November 5, 2012	1.18

Ending Segment: "High Speed Recap" - At the end of each episode, a 30-second montage of all the videos in the episode is played.

=== Season 3 (2013) ===
Note: Starting with this season, the guest walks on stage before greeting Rob and sitting on the couch with Sterling and Chanel.

No. in series	No. in season	Guest	Original air date	U.S. viewers (millions)
37	1	DJ Pauly D	February 14, 2013	1.75
38	2	Mac Miller	February 21, 2013	1.33
39	3	Steve-O	February 28, 2013	1.49
40	4	Chanel and Sterling III	March 7, 2013	1.79
41	5	Dana White	March 14, 2013	1.54
42	6	Bam Margera	March 21, 2013	1.58
43	7	Ryan Sheckler	March 28, 2013	1.72
44	8	Carmen Electra	April 4, 2013	1.52
45	9	Ken Block	April 11, 2013	1.69
46	10	Riff Raff	April 18, 2013	1.98
47	11	Dominic Monaghan	July 18, 2013	1.49
48	12	A$AP Rocky	July 25, 2013	1.53
49	13	Ray J	August 1, 2013	1.81
50	14	Chanel and Sterling IV	August 8, 2013	1.44
51	15	Edward Barbanell	August 15, 2013	1.63
52	16	Joanna Krupa	August 22, 2013	1.54
53	17	Chanel and Sterling V	August 29, 2013	1.14
54	18	Steve Aoki	September 5, 2013	1.04
55	19	Cody Simpson	September 12, 2013	0.96
56	20	Cast of Fantasy Factory	September 19, 2013	1.30

Ending Segment: "Chanel's Best Guess" - At the end of each episode, Rob would display two words on the screen (in the Eddie Barbanell episode, three), and have Chanel guess what type of video would play.

=== Season 4 (2014) ===
No. in series	No. in season	Guest	Original air date	U.S. viewers (millions)
57	1	Nick Swardson	January 2, 2014	1.37
58	2	Snoop Lion	January 2, 2014	1.36
59	3	Chanel and Sterling VI	January 9, 2014	1.39
60	4	Jamie Lee	January 9, 2014	1.33
61	5	Stevie Ryan	January 16, 2014	1.51
62	6	Chanel and Sterling VII	January 23, 2014	1.23
63	7	Mike Epps	January 26, 2014	1.25
64	8	Michael B. Jordan	January 26, 2014	1.34
65	9	Jenna Marbles	January 30, 2014	1.55
66	10	Jackson Nicoll	February 6, 2014	1.54
67	11	Lil Duval	February 13, 2014	1.50
68	12	Chanel and Sterling VIII	February 20, 2014	1.45
69	13	The Dudesons	February 27, 2014	1.25
70	14	Nyjah Huston	March 6, 2014	1.27
71	15	Lacey Chabert	March 9, 2014	1.26
72	16	Derek Hough	March 13, 2014	1.44
73	17	Chanel and Sterling IX	March 20, 2014	1.51
74	18	Tyga	March 27, 2014	1.33
75	19	Guy Fieri	March 27, 2014	1.32
76	20	Harley Morenstein	March 31, 2014	0.97
77	21	Chanel and Sterling X	April 3, 2014	1.16

Ending Segment: "B.Y.O.C." (Bring Your Own Clip) - At the end of each episode in Season 4, Rob would allow the guest to bring a clip of their choice. If there was no guest, then either Rob, Sterling, or Chanel would provide the clip (in the Jackson Nicoll episode, Rob brought the clip instead of Jackson).

=== Season 5 (2014) ===
No. in series	No. in season	Guest	Original air date	U.S. viewers (millions)
78	1	Chrissy Teigen	July 10, 2014	1.48
79	2	Eddie Huang	July 17, 2014	1.10
80	3	David Spade	July 24, 2014	1.04
81	4	Chanel and Sterling XI	July 31, 2014	0.85
82	5	Maria Menounos	August 7, 2014	1.04
83	6	David Arquette	August 14, 2014	0.83
84	7	Larry King	August 21, 2014	1.14
85	8	Chanel and Sterling XII	August 28, 2014	0.90
86	9	Danny Way	September 4, 2014	0.96
87	10	Paul Rodriguez	September 11, 2014	1.04
88	11	Kylie Jenner & Kendall Jenner	September 18, 2014	1.08
89	12	French Montana	September 25, 2014	0.83
90	13	Chanel and Sterling XIII	October 2, 2014	0.89
91	14	Sage Kotsenburg	October 9, 2014	0.81
92	15	Chanel Iman	October 16, 2014	0.88
93	16	100th Episode Special	October 23, 2014	1.07
94	17	Chanel and Sterling XIV	October 30, 2014	0.85
95	18	Nate Robinson	October 30, 2014	0.84

Ending Segment: "Hashtag It" - At the end of each episode in the first half of Season 5, Rob would show a clip and Rob, Sterling, Chanel, and the guest would try to apply a funny hashtag to it. In the second half of Season 5 (starting with the Kylie and Kendall Jenner episode), the hashtag was revealed first, and the group would try to guess what kind of video would play.

=== Season 6 (2015) ===
No. in series	No. in season	Guest	Original air date	U.S. viewers (millions)
96	1	Ne-Yo (2006–2007)	January 1, 2015	1.01
97	2	Chanel and Sterling XV	January 1, 2015	0.96
98	3	Jagger Eaton	January 8, 2015	0.98
99	4	Lyndie Greenwood	January 8, 2015	1.01
100	5	Tanner Foust	January 15, 2015	0.79
101	6	Tyler the Creator	January 15, 2015	0.76
102	7	YG	January 22, 2015	0.83
103	8	Chanel and Sterling XVI	January 22, 2015	0.91
104	9	Chanel and Sterling XVII	January 29, 2015	1.02
105	10	Future	January 29, 2015	0.92
106	11	Smosh	February 5, 2015	0.97
107	12	Danny Brown	February 12, 2015	0.89
108	13	Chanel and Sterling XVIII	February 19, 2015	1.01
109	14	Rick Ross	February 26, 2015	0.91
110	15	Nina Agdal	March 5, 2015	0.89
111	16	Chanel and Sterling XIX	March 12, 2015	0.85
112	17	Eric Andre	March 19, 2015	1.17
113	18	Brooks Wheelan	March 26, 2015	0.81
114	19	Prince Fielder	April 2, 2015	0.88
115	20	Juicy J	April 9, 2015	0.75
116	21	Tyler Posey	April 16, 2015	0.71
117	22	Prom Edition	April 23, 2015	0.70
118	23	Nick Swisher	April 30, 2015	0.72
119	24	Chanel and Sterling XX	May 7, 2015	0.83
120	25	Iliza Shlesinger	May 14, 2015	0.69
121	26	Dr. Drew Pinsky	May 21, 2015	1.03
122	27	LeSean McCoy	May 28, 2015	0.92
123	28	Dan Bilzerian	June 4, 2015	0.75
124	29	Travis Mills	June 11, 2015	0.90
125	30	Chanel West Coast	June 18, 2015	1.05
126	31	Susanne Daniels	June 25, 2015	0.87
127	32	The Fat Jewish	June 25, 2015	0.96

Ending Segment: "Clip Roulette" - At the end of each episode, Rob would display stills of three different clips and the guest (or Chanel or Sterling) would choose one to play. The Mr. Rochelle episode and the Chanel and Sterling XVI episodes were originally taped for Season 5, so those two episodes features the "Hashtag It" closing segment. The episode with Brooks Wheelan did not include an ending segment.

=== Season 7 (2015–16) ===
The season premiered on MTV on October 8, 2015, with guest 50 Cent and concluded on June 30, 2016, with two guests: Zara Larsson and Rae Sremmurd.

Note: The first two episodes of this season were shot in New York at 1515 Broadway as opposed to Los Angeles. However, there was no laptop stage on the set. This is also the final season to use the laptop stage.

No. in series	No. in season	Guest	Original air date	U.S. viewers (millions)
128	1	50 Cent	October 8, 2015	0.69
129	2	Action Bronson	October 15, 2015	0.60
130	3	Mac Miller II	October 22, 2015	0.83
131	4	Chanel and Sterling XXI	October 29, 2015	0.66
132	5	Andy Bell	November 5, 2015	0.68
133	6	Machine Gun Kelly	November 12, 2015	0.64
134	7	Dude Perfect	November 19, 2015	0.75
135	8	Charlotte McKinney	December 3, 2015	0.53
136	9	Chanel and Sterling XXII	December 10, 2015	0.67
137	10	Robbie Maddison	December 17, 2015	0.59
138	11	Chanel and Sterling XXIII	January 7, 2016	0.74
139	12	Paige	January 14, 2016	0.53
140	13	Steelo Brim	January 21, 2016	0.77
141	14	Travis Scott	January 28, 2016	0.77
142	15	Jordin Sparks	February 4, 2016	0.75
143	16	Chanel and Sterling XXIV	February 11, 2016	0.68
144	17	Diplo	February 18, 2016	0.67
145	18	Ryan Villopoto	February 25, 2016	0.65
146	19	Tyler Farr	March 3, 2016	0.74
147	20	Chris Pontius	March 10, 2016	0.61
148	21	Chase Elliott	June 2, 2016	0.72
149	22	Ja Rule	June 2, 2016	0.75
150	23	Chanel and Sterling XXV	June 9, 2016	0.85
151	24	Sage the Gemini	June 9, 2016	0.81
152	25	Sam Sadler	June 16, 2016	0.54
153	26	Ireland Baldwin	June 16, 2016	0.56
154	27	Chris "Drama" Pfaff II	June 23, 2016	0.79
155	28	Chanel and Sterling XXVI	June 23, 2016	0.81
156	29	Zara Larsson	June 30, 2016	0.87
157	30	Rae Sremmurd	June 30, 2016	0.95

Ending Segment: Unlike previous seasons, the ending segment varied between each episode in Season 7. The most common segments are "Flash Forward", where Rob would play two clips in the style of "before and after", and "Not What It Looks/Sounds Like", where Rob would play a questionable sound or video clip, only to have it become something totally unexpected. Later episodes in the season omitted the ending segment.

=== Season 8 (2016) ===
The season premiered on MTV on July 7, 2016, with two episodes: Chanel and Sterling XXVII and Eric Andre II and concluded on September 27, 2016, with three episodes: Chanel and Sterling XXXVII, Jolene Van Vugt and Chanel and Sterling XXXVIII.

Note: The oversized laptop is replaced with a new set.

No. in series	No. in season	Guest	Original air date	U.S. viewers (millions)
158	1	Chanel and Sterling XXVII	July 7, 2016	0.82
159	2	Eric Andre II	July 7, 2016	0.85
160	3	Rob Gronkowski	July 14, 2016	0.70
161	4	Chanel and Sterling XXVIII	July 14, 2016	0.67
162	5	Leona Lewis	July 21, 2016	0.66
163	6	Marcus Lemonis	July 21, 2016	0.75
164	7	Kaitlyn Farrington	July 28, 2016	0.79
165	8	Hampton Yount	July 28, 2016	0.75
166	9	Chanel and Sterling XXIX	August 5, 2016	0.59
167	10	Redfoo	August 5, 2016	0.61
168	11	Metta World Peace	August 12, 2016	0.53
169	12	Chanel and Sterling XXX	August 12, 2016	0.50
170	13	Bubba Wallace	August 12, 2016	0.52
171	14	Chanel and Sterling XXXI	August 12, 2016	0.51
172	15	T-Pain	August 19, 2016	0.48
173	16	Chanel and Sterling XXXII	August 19, 2016	0.50
174	17	Baddie Winkle	August 23, 2016	0.55
175	18	Chanel and Sterling XXXIII	August 23, 2016	0.56
176	19	DeMarcus Ware & Von Miller	August 23, 2016	0.50
177	20	Chanel and Sterling XXXIV	August 30, 2016	0.51
178	21	Wanda Sykes	August 30, 2016	0.58
179	22	Chanel and Sterling XXXV	September 6, 2016	0.51
180	23	Dillon Francis	September 6, 2016	0.48
181	24	Dave England	September 13, 2016	0.53
182	25	Bryan Callen & Brendan Schaub	September 13, 2016	0.57
183	26	Chanel and Sterling XXXVI	September 20, 2016	0.46
184	27	Jerry Springer	September 20, 2016	0.51
185	28	Chanel and Sterling XXXVII	September 27, 2016	0.55
186	29	Jolene Van Vugt	September 27, 2016	0.59
187	30	Chanel and Sterling XXXVIII	September 27, 2016	0.53

Ending Segment: Like season 7, this varies between 2 segments, "Clip Hybrid" - where Rob would take two or more clips and mash them up together; and "Slo-Mo Ender" - where a slow-motion clip is played.

=== Season 9 (2017) ===
No. in series	No. in season	Guest	Original air date	U.S. viewers (millions)
188	1	Chanel and Sterling XXXIX	January 20, 2017	0.59
189	2	Jamie Bestwick	January 20, 2017	0.70
190	3	Chanel and Sterling XL	January 27, 2017	0.50
191	4	Clinton Sparks	January 27, 2017	0.57
192	5	Chanel and Sterling XLI	February 3, 2017	0.49
193	6	Danger Ehren	February 3, 2017	0.59
194	7	Chanel and Sterling XLII	February 10, 2017	0.50
195	8	Steve Wilkos	February 10, 2017	0.65
196	9	Chanel and Sterling XLIII	February 17, 2017	0.44
197	10	Michael Crossland	February 17, 2017	0.47
198	11	Teyana Taylor	February 24, 2017	0.53
199	12	Chanel and Sterling XLIV	March 3, 2017	0.53
200	13	The Chainsmokers	March 10, 2017	0.53
201	14	Chanel and Sterling XLV	March 17, 2017	0.49
202	15	Vic Mensa	March 24, 2017	0.49
203	16	Chanel and Sterling XLVI	March 31, 2017	0.44
204	17	Jessie J	April 7, 2017	0.47
205	18	Chanel and Sterling XLVII	April 14, 2017	0.35
206	19	DJ Paul	April 21, 2017	0.44
207	20	Chanel and Sterling XLVIII	April 28, 2017	0.44
208	21	Young M.A.	May 5, 2017	0.51
209	22	Grossest Episode Ever	June 8, 2017	0.35
210	23	Tami Roman	June 8, 2017	0.42
211	24	Ridic Remix	June 8, 2017	0.48
212	25	Summer Vacation	June 15, 2017	0.53
213	26	Charlamagne Tha God	June 15, 2017	0.59
214	27	Gene Dyrdek	June 15, 2017	0.58
215	28	DRAM	June 22, 2017	0.56
216	29	Post Malone	June 22, 2017	0.50
217	30	DJ Khaled (Major Keydiculousness)	June 22, 2017	0.48

Ending Segment: "_____ Or _____?" - At the end of each episode in Season 9, Rob would ask a question in the form of "this or that", i.e. "Flash or Splash", and play a clip depending on their response. Although sometimes, the ending clip has both elements.

=== Season 10 (2017–18) ===
No. in series	No. in season	Guest	Original air date	U.S. viewers (millions)
218	1	The Ridickys	September 1, 2017	0.53
219	2	21 Savage	September 1, 2017	0.58
220	3	Chanel and Sterling XLIX	September 1, 2017	0.64
221	4	Ty Dolla Sign	September 8, 2017	0.40
222	5	DJ Mustard	September 8, 2017	0.42
223	6	Chanel and Sterling L	September 8, 2017	0.43
224	7	Kidiculousness	September 15, 2017	0.37
225	8	G-Eazy	September 15, 2017	0.44
226	9	Gaten Matarazzo (Scarediculousness)	September 22, 2017	0.62
227	10	Chanel and Sterling LI	September 22, 2017	0.58
228	11	The Happy Everything Episode	December 1, 2017	0.45
229	12	Snowdiculousness	December 1, 2017	0.47
230	13	Mark Cuban	December 1, 2017	0.48
231	14	Ri-Chick-ulousness	December 1, 2017	0.52
232	15	Christina Milian	December 8, 2017	0.56
233	16	Nerdiculousness	December 8, 2017	0.48
234	17	Bro-diculousness	December 8, 2017	0.41
235	18	Chanel and Sterling LII	December 15, 2017	0.52
236	19	Mike Posner	December 22, 2017	0.61
237	20	Jordan Clarkson	December 22, 2017	0.61
238	21	Waka Flocka Flame	December 29, 2017	0.40
239	22	Keyshia Cole	December 29, 2017	0.51
240	23	Chanel and Sterling LIII	January 5, 2018	0.77
241	24	Red, White and Bluediculousness	January 5, 2018	0.77
242	25	Highdiculousness	January 12, 2018	0.70
243	26	Rockdiculousness with Steel Panther	January 12, 2018	0.71
244	27	The Ridiculousness 500	January 19, 2018	0.64
245	28	Wheeler Walker Jr.	January 19, 2018	0.75
246	29	Big Freedia	January 26, 2018	0.57
247	30	Matt Shively	January 26, 2018	N/A

End segment: this season contained multiple end segments. The "____ or ____?" ending returns from Season 9, but also seen is "Crowd Control", where Rob shows the names of two clips and allows the audience to choose which clip they would like to see by show of applause; and "Back That Clip Up", where Rob plays a clip backwards.

=== Season 11 (2018) ===
The season premiered on August 5, 2018, with 4 episodes: Adam Rippon, Chanel and Sterling LIV, Justina Valentine, and Chanel and Sterling LVI and concluded on October 12, 2018, with two episodes: Chanel and Sterling and Sterling LXXI and Chanel and Sterling LXXII.

Note: This season has an all-new and simplified logo, and the background of the set was changing color from red to blue until Season 30. This is also the 1st season to permanently retire the end segments after the first 10 seasons.

No. in series	No. in season	Guest	Original air date	U.S. viewers (millions)
248	1	Adam Rippon	August 5, 2018	0.65
249	2	Chanel and Sterling LIV	August 5, 2018	0.68
250	3	Justina Valentine	August 5, 2018	0.73
251	4	Chanel and Sterling LVI	August 5, 2018	0.62
252	5	Max Schneider	August 12, 2018	0.57
253	6	Chanel and Sterling LV	August 12, 2018	0.71
254	7	Cody Garbrandt	August 12, 2018	0.66
255	8	Chanel and Sterling LVII	August 12, 2018	0.66
256	9	Chloe Kim	August 12, 2018	0.72
257	10	Chanel and Sterling LVIII	August 12, 2018	0.69
258	11	Jack & Jack	August 19, 2018	0.69
259	12	Chanel and Sterling LXII	August 19, 2018	0.60
260	13	Jasmine Tookes	August 19, 2018	0.67
261	14	Chanel and Sterling LXIII	August 19, 2018	0.42
262	15	Steve-O II	August 26, 2018	0.54
263	16	Shanina Shaik	August 26, 2018	0.54
264	17	Jermaine Dupri	August 26, 2018	0.47
265	18	Michael Carbonaro	August 26, 2018	0.57
266	19	Brendan Schaub	September 2, 2018	0.56
267	20	Chanel and Sterling LXI	September 2, 2018	0.62
268	21	Lewis Howes	September 2, 2018	0.67
269	22	Chanel and Sterling LIX	September 2, 2018	0.74
270	23	Laurie Hernandez	September 9, 2018	0.60
271	24	Supreme Patty	September 9, 2018	0.58
272	25	Jimmy Uso and Naomi	September 9, 2018	0.37
273	26	Chanel and Sterling LX	September 9, 2018	0.62
274	27	Chanel and Sterling LXX	September 16, 2018	0.55
275	28	Michael Rapaport	September 16, 2018	0.55
276	29	Chris "Drama" Pfaff III	September 16, 2018	0.50
277	30	Kevin Hart (Hartdiculousness)	September 23, 2018	0.78
278	31	Chanel and Sterling LXV	September 23, 2018	0.65
279	32	Chanel and Sterling LXVIII	September 23, 2018	0.70
280	33	Chanel and Sterling LXVI	September 30, 2018	0.60
281	34	Brendan Schaub II	September 30, 2018	0.61
282	35	Gary Owen	September 30, 2018	0.61
283	36	Chris "Drama" Pfaff IV	September 30, 2018	0.45
284	37	Chanel and Sterling LXIV	September 30, 2018	0.58
285	38	Chanel and Sterling LXIX	October 5, 2018	0.59
286	39	Chanel and Sterling LXVII	October 5, 2018	0.69
287	40	Chanel and Sterling LXXI	October 12, 2018	0.46
288	41	Chanel and Sterling LXXII	October 12, 2018	0.55

=== Season 12 (2018–19) ===
The season premiered on October 19, 2018, with two episodes: Rob's Parents II and Chanel and Sterling LXXIII and concluded on February 13, 2019, with two episodes: Chanel and Sterling XCII and Chanel and Sterling XCIII.

No. in series	No. in season	Guest	Original air date	U.S. viewers (millions)
289	1	Rob's Parents II	October 19, 2018	0.43
290	2	Chanel and Sterling LXXIII	October 19, 2018	0.47
291	3	Kelly Rowland	October 26, 2018	0.53
292	4	Chanel and Sterling LXXIV	October 26, 2018	0.60
293	5	Swizz Beatz	November 2, 2018	0.54
294	6	Chanel and Sterling LXXV	November 2, 2018	0.69
295	7	Zach Holmes	November 2, 2018	N/A
296	8	Ken Block II	November 9, 2018	0.60
297	9	Chanel and Sterling LXXVI	November 9, 2018	0.66
298	10	Terrence J	November 9, 2018	0.57
299	11	Matt Barnes	November 16, 2018	0.53
300	12	Chanel and Sterling LXXVII	November 16, 2018	0.56
301	13	Brian Deegan	November 16, 2018	0.61
302	14	Mike Tyson	November 30, 2018	0.63
303	15	Rob Riggle	November 30, 2018	0.74
304	16	Chanel and Sterling LXXVIII	November 30, 2018	0.72
305	17	Mike Holston	December 7, 2018	0.58
306	18	Chanel and Sterling LXXIX	December 7, 2018	0.50
307	19	Chanel and Sterling LXXX	December 7, 2018	0.56
308	20	Allen Stone	December 14, 2018	0.62
309	21	Chanel and Sterling LXXXI	December 14, 2018	0.65
310	22	Amanda Cerny	December 14, 2018	0.61
311	23	Shiggy	December 21, 2018	0.49
312	24	Chanel and Sterling LXXXII	December 21, 2018	0.53
313	25	Jimmy O. Yang	December 28, 2018	0.55
314	26	Chanel and Sterling LXXXIII	December 28, 2018	0.56
315	27	Victor Cruz	January 4, 2019	0.59
316	28	Becky Lynch	January 4, 2019	0.60
317	29	Trevor Jackson	January 11, 2019	0.54
318	30	Chanel and Sterling LXXXIV	January 11, 2019	0.52
319	31	Florida Georgia Line	January 11, 2019	0.53
320	32	Jay Rock	January 18, 2019	0.55
321	33	Chanel and Sterling LXXXV	January 18, 2019	0.58
322	34	Chanel and Sterling LXXXVI	January 18, 2019	0.60
323	35	Daniel Cormier	January 25, 2019	0.53
324	36	Chanel and Sterling LXXXVII	January 25, 2019	0.53
325	37	Chanel and Sterling LXXXVIII	January 25, 2019	0.50
326	38	Rich the Kid	February 6, 2019	0.49
327	39	Chanel and Sterling LXXXIX	February 6, 2019	0.49
328	40	Chanel and Sterling XC	February 10, 2019	0.56
329	41	Chanel and Sterling XCI	February 10, 2019	0.60
330	42	Chanel and Sterling XCII	February 13, 2019	0.50
331	43	Chanel and Sterling XCIII	February 13, 2019	0.54

=== Season 13 (2019) ===
The season premiered at February 17, 2019, with two episodes: Chanel and Sterling XCIV and Chanel and Sterling XCV. The season concluded on May 10, 2019, with two episodes with two professional wrestlers: T.J. Dillashaw and Paige VanZant.

No. in series	No. in season	Guest	Original air date	U.S. viewers (millions)
332	1	Chanel and Sterling XCIV	February 17, 2019	0.68
333	2	Chanel and Sterling XCV	February 17, 2019	0.73
334	3	Cesar Millan	February 20, 2019	0.55
335	4	Chanel and Sterling XCVI	February 20, 2019	0.56
336	5	Danielle Herrington	February 24, 2019	0.78
337	6	Chanel and Sterling XCVII	February 24, 2019	0.85
338	7	Bow Wow	February 27, 2019	0.38
339	8	Chanel and Sterling XCVIII	February 27, 2019	0.41
340	9	Ben Baller	March 3, 2019	0.77
341	10	Chanel and Sterling XCIX	March 3, 2019	0.73
342	11	Machine Gun Kelly II	March 6, 2019	0.46
343	12	Tank(8/21/26)	March 6, 2019	0.43
344	13	O.T Genasis	March 10, 2019	0.75
345	14	Chanel and Sterling C	March 10, 2019	0.65
346	15	Kobe Bryant	March 13, 2019	0.65
347	16	Chanel and Sterling CI	March 15, 2019	0.59
348	17	Lil Yachty	March 15, 2019	0.68
349	18	Madison Beer	March 17, 2019	0.77
350	19	Chanel and Sterling CII	March 17, 2019	0.72
351	20	Kurt Busch	March 20, 2019	0.49
352	21	Chanel and Sterling CIII	March 20, 2019	0.50
353	22	Chanel and Sterling CIV	March 22, 2019	0.61
354	23	Miguel	March 24, 2019	0.67
355	24	Chanel and Sterling CV	March 24, 2019	0.75
356	25	Christian Yelich	March 27, 2019	0.65
357	26	Chanel and Sterling CVI	March 27, 2019	0.62
358	27	Penn Jillette	March 29, 2019	0.55
359	28	Chris Hardwick	March 31, 2019	0.77
360	29	Chanel and Sterling CVII	March 31, 2019	0.75
361	30	Steve Aoki II	April 3, 2019	0.54
362	31	Chanel and Sterling CVIII	April 5, 2019	0.47
363	32	Axell Hodges	April 12, 2019	0.50
364	33	Chanel and Sterling CIX	April 12, 2019	0.50
365	34	Harry Hudson	April 19, 2019	0.47
366	35	Chanel and Sterling CX	April 19, 2019	0.42
367	36	Tory Lanez	April 26, 2019	0.49
368	37	Chanel and Sterling CXI	April 26, 2019	0.60
369	38	Brendan Schaub III	May 3, 2019	0.46
370	39	Margie Plus	May 3, 2019	0.43
371	40	T.J. Dillashaw	May 10, 2019	0.51
372	41	Paige VanZant	May 10, 2019	0.65

=== Season 14 (2019) ===
The fourteenth season premiered on MTV on May 17, 2019, with two episodes: Too Short and Chanel and Sterling CXII and concluded on September 6, 2019, with guest Yo Gotti.

Notes: This is the first season to feature new episodes on every Friday, Saturday and Sunday nights.

Also, co-host Chanel West Coast's natural hair color was also changed from blonde to brown after the first 13 seasons.

No. in series	No. in season	Guest	Original air date	U.S. viewers (millions)
373	1	Too Short	May 17, 2019	0.49
374	2	Chanel and Sterling CXII	May 17, 2019	0.50
375	3	Jarvis Landry	May 24, 2019	0.57
376	4	Chanel and Sterling CXIII	May 24, 2019	0.55
377	5	Kane Brown	May 31, 2019	0.48
378	6	Chanel and Sterling CXIV	May 31, 2019	0.52
379	7	Tyron Woodley	June 7, 2019	0.40
380	8	Chanel and Sterling CXV	June 7, 2019	0.43
381	9	Mark Hoppus	June 14, 2019	0.45
382	10	Chanel and Sterling CXVI	June 14, 2019	0.44
383	11	Josef Newgarden	June 21, 2019	0.40
384	12	Chanel and Sterling CXVII	June 21, 2019	0.41
385	13	Trey Songz	June 28, 2019	0.40
386	14	Chanel and Sterling CXVIII	June 28, 2019	0.46
387	15	Grant Gustin	July 5, 2019	0.38
388	16	Chanel and Sterling CXIX	July 5, 2019	0.42
389	17	Chanel and Sterling CXX	July 7, 2019	0.55
390	18	Austin Mahone	July 12, 2019	0.43
391	19	Chanel and Sterling CXXI	July 12, 2019	0.46
392	20	Schoolboy Q	July 14, 2019	0.53
393	21	Vitaly Zdorovetskiy	July 19, 2019	0.47
394	22	Chanel and Sterling CXXII	July 19, 2019	0.51
395	23	Chanel and Sterling CXXIII	July 21, 2019	0.53
396	24	Melvin Ingram	July 26, 2019	0.53
397	25	Chanel and Sterling CXXIV	July 27, 2019	0.51
398	26	Chanel and Sterling CXXV	July 28, 2019	0.57
399	27	Lil Skies	August 2, 2019	0.41
400	28	Chanel and Sterling CXXVI	August 3, 2019	0.38
401	29	Sean Kingston	August 4, 2019	0.58
402	30	Mike Holston II	August 9, 2019	0.52
403	31	Chanel and Sterling CXXVII	August 10, 2019	0.47
404	32	Chanel and Sterling CXXVIII	August 11, 2019	0.70
405	33	Ally Brooke	August 16, 2019	0.46
406	34	(MTV Video Music Award) VMA Moments	August 17, 2019	0.47
407	35	Lil Jon II	August 18, 2019	0.55
408	36	VMA Awards	August 23, 2019	0.49
409	37	Chanel and Sterling CXXIX	August 24, 2019	0.39
410	38	Elle King	August 25, 2019	0.46
411	39	Steelo Brim and Chris Reinacher (Wine and Weed)	August 30, 2019	0.39
412	40	Chanel and Sterling CXXX	August 31, 2019	0.44
413	41	Chanel and Sterling CXXXI	September 1, 2019	0.46
414	42	Yo Gotti	September 6, 2019	0.59

=== Season 15 (2019) ===
The fifteenth season premiered on September 7, 2019, on MTV with Chanel and Sterling CXXXII and concluded on December 29, 2019, with guest Iman Shumpert.

Note: This is the final season to air in the 2010s.

No. in series	No. in season	Guest	Original air date	U.S. viewers (millions)
415	1	Chanel and Sterling CXXXII	September 7, 2019	0.39
416	2	Chanel and Sterling CXXXIII	September 8, 2019	0.54
417	3	Karrueche Tran	September 13, 2019	0.43
418	4	Chanel and Sterling CXXXIV	September 14, 2019	0.50
419	5	Nev Schulman	September 15, 2019	0.52
420	6	Trina	September 20, 2019	0.60
421	7	Chanel and Sterling CXXXV	September 21, 2019	0.52
422	8	Camille Kostek	September 22, 2019	0.57
423	9	ASAP Ferg	September 22, 2019	0.54
424	10	Chanel and Sterling CXXXVI	September 27, 2019	0.50
425	11	Chanel and Sterling CXXXVII	September 27, 2019	0.52
426	12	Chloe Trautman	September 29, 2019	0.49
427	13	Chanel and Sterling CXXXVIII	September 29, 2019	0.47
428	14	Chanel and Sterling CXXXIX	October 4, 2019	0.38
429	15	Rick Ross II	October 6, 2019	0.50
430	16	Wale	October 11, 2019	0.48
431	17	Chanel and Sterling CXL	October 13, 2019	0.43
432	18	Chanel and Sterling CXLI	October 18, 2019	0.36
433	19	DaniLeigh	October 20, 2019	0.53
434	20	Chanel and Sterling CXLII	October 25, 2019	0.33
435	21	LaVar Ball	October 27, 2019	0.38
436	22	Tyga II	November 3, 2019	0.49
437	23	Chanel and Sterling CXLIII	November 3, 2019	0.50
438	24	Chanel and Sterling CXLIV	November 8, 2019	0.47
439	25	Tommy Lee	November 10, 2019	0.46
440	26	Chanel and Sterling CXLV	November 15, 2019	0.52
441	27	Karl-Anthony Towns	November 17, 2019	0.56
442	28	Chanel and Sterling CXLVI	November 22, 2019	0.49
443	29	Wes Scantlin	November 24, 2019	0.48
444	30	Chanel and Sterling CXLVII	November 29, 2019	0.48
445	31	Winter Holidays	December 1, 2019	0.42
446	32	Chanel and Sterling CXLVIII	December 6, 2019	0.43
447	33	Anderson Paak	December 8, 2019	0.43
448	34	Chanel and Sterling CXLIX	December 13, 2019	0.57
449	35	Brittany Furlan	December 15, 2019	0.39
450	36	Chanel and Sterling CL	December 20, 2019	0.39
451	37	Jasper Dolphin & Errol Chatham	December 22, 2019	0.58
452	38	Chanel and Sterling CLI	December 27, 2019	0.41
453	39	Iman Shumpert	December 29, 2019	0.42

=== Season 16 (2020) ===
The sixteenth season premiered on MTV on January 6, 2020, with one episode: Chanel and Sterling CLII and concluded on March 11, 2020, with guest Joey Fatone.

Notes: This marked the first season to feature new episodes airing on Mondays through Thursdays on MTV since Season 9. This also marked the first season to air in the 2020s.

No. in series	No. in season	Guest	Original air date	U.S. viewers (millions)
454	1	Chanel and Sterling CLII	January 6, 2020	0.38
455	2	Juicy J II	January 7, 2020	0.23
456	3	Chanel and Sterling CLIII	January 8, 2020	0.32
457	4	Gene Simmons	January 9, 2020	0.28
458	5	Dave East	January 13, 2020	0.34
459	6	B Simone	January 14, 2020	0.29
460	7	Chanel and Sterling CLIV	January 15, 2020	0.29
461	8	Miles Brown	January 16, 2020	0.26
462	9	Chanel and Sterling CLV	January 20, 2020	0.42
463	10	Chanel and Sterling CLVI	January 21, 2020	0.21
464	11	Chanel and Sterling CLVII	January 22, 2020	0.37
465	12	Xzibit	January 23, 2020	0.21
466	13	Chanel and Sterling CLVIII	January 27, 2020	0.32
467	14	Chief Keef	January 28, 2020	0.28
468	15	Chanel and Sterling CLIX	January 29, 2020	0.36
469	16	Brian Urlacher (Big Game Special)	January 30, 2020	0.30
470	17	Jason Aldean	February 3, 2020	0.42
471	18	Puma Robinson	February 4, 2020	0.31
472	19	Chanel and Sterling CLIX	February 5, 2020	0.30
473	20	Johnny Bananas	February 6, 2020	0.21
474	21	Chanel and Sterling CLX	February 10, 2020	0.40
Special	22	Grossness	February 10, 2020	
475	23	Chanel and Sterling CLXI	February 11, 2020	0.28
Special	24	Grossness II	February 11, 2020	
476	25	Chanel and Sterling CLXII	February 12, 2020	0.35
Special	26	WTF!ness	February 12, 2020	
477	27	Jake Paul	February 13, 2020	0.25
Special	28	WTF!ness II	February 13, 2020	
478	29	Chanel and Sterling CLXIII	February 17, 2020	0.34
479	30	Chanel and Sterling CLXIV	February 18, 2020	0.27
480	31	Chanel and Sterling CLXV	February 19, 2020	0.29
481	32	Snooki	February 20, 2020	0.28
482	33	Chanel and Sterling CLXVI	February 24, 2020	0.35
483	34	Chanel and Sterling CLXVII	February 25, 2020	0.25
484	35	Daymond John	February 26, 2020	0.34
485	36	Kelly Hansen	February 27, 2020	0.25
486	37	Chanel and Sterling CLXVIII	March 2, 2020	0.40
487	38	Chanel and Sterling CLXIX	March 3, 2020	0.26
488	39	Chanel and Sterling CLXX	March 4, 2020	0.31
489	40	Yelawolf	March 5, 2020	0.29
490	41	Chanel and Sterling CLXXI	March 9, 2020	0.40
491	42	Jeremy Meeks	March 10, 2020	0.30
492	43	Joey Fatone	March 11, 2020	0.37

=== Season 17 (2020) ===
The season premiered on MTV on April 20, 2020 with guest Wyclef Jean, just in 2 weeks after the end of Season 16. The rest of the season continued airing on Monday August 17, 2020 with Chanel and Sterling CLXXXIII and concluded on Monday September 14, 2020, with Chanel and Sterling CCI.

No. in series	No. in season	Guest	Original air date	U.S. viewers (millions)
493	1	Wyclef Jean	April 20, 2020	0.42
494	2	Chanel and Sterling CLXXII	April 21, 2020	0.29
495	3	Nick Young	April 22, 2020	0.39
496	4	Rob Huebel	April 27, 2020	0.36
497	5	Chanel and Sterling CLXXIII	April 28, 2020	0.31
498	6	Chanel and Sterling CLXXIV	April 29, 2020	0.27
499	7	FaZe Rug	April 30, 2020	0.30
500	8	Eric Roberts	May 4, 2020	0.53
501	9	Chanel and Sterling CLXXV	May 5, 2020	0.40
Special	10	Bustedness	May 6, 2020	0.29^{[643]}
Special	11	Bustedness II	May 7, 2020	0.18^{[644]}
502	12	Chanel and Sterling CLXXVI	May 11, 2020	0.45
503	13	Chris Jericho	May 12, 2020	0.44
504	14	Chanel and Sterling CLXXVII	May 13, 2020	0.35
505	15	Chanel and Sterling CLXXVIII	May 14, 2020	0.41
506	16	Chanel and Sterling CLXXIX	May 18, 2020	0.30
507	17	Chanel and Sterling CLXXX	May 19, 2020	0.31
508	18	Chanel and Sterling CLXXXI	May 20, 2020	0.32
509	19	JoJo	May 21, 2020	0.43
510	20	Chanel and Sterling CLXXXII	May 25, 2020	0.40
511	21	Chanel and Sterling CLXXXIII	August 17, 2020	0.30
512	22	Chanel and Sterling CLXXXIV	August 18, 2020	0.47
513	23	Chanel and Sterling CLXXXV	August 19, 2020	0.33
514	24	Chanel and Sterling CLXXXVI	August 20, 2020	0.39
515	25	Summer Celebration	August 21, 2020	0.36
516	26	Chanel and Sterling CLXXXVII	August 24, 2020	0.30
517	27	Chanel and Sterling CLXXXVIII	August 25, 2020	0.31
518	28	Chanel and Sterling CLXXXIX	August 26, 2020	0.29
519	29	Chanel and Sterling CXC	August 27, 2020	0.34
520	30	Chanel and Sterling CXC	August 28, 2020	0.26
521	31	Chanel and Sterling CXCI	August 31, 2020	0.25
522	32	Chanel and Sterling CXCII	September 1, 2020	0.23
523	33	Chanel and Sterling CXCIII	September 2, 2020	0.20
524	34	Chanel and Sterling CXCIV	September 3, 2020	0.30
525	35	Chanel and Sterling CXCV	September 4, 2020	0.43
526	36	Chanel and Sterling CXCVI	September 7, 2020	0.25
527	37	Chanel and Sterling CXCVII	September 8, 2020	0.21
528	38	Chanel and Sterling CXCVIII	September 9, 2020	0.21
529	39	Chanel and Sterling CXCIX	September 10, 2020	0.23
530	40	Chanel and Sterling CC	September 11, 2020	0.33
531	41	Chanel and Sterling CCI	September 14, 2020	0.25

=== Season 18 (2020) ===
The season premiered on MTV on September 15, 2020 with one episode: Chanel and Sterling CCII, and concluded on November 19, 2020 with one episode: Chanel and Sterling CCXXIX.

Notes: Starting in season 18 until season 42, audience seating was completely removed and seating between Steelo and Chanel are spaced 6 feet apart and appearances by guest celebrities (with the exception of Wells Adams, Lauv and Lamorne Morris) scarce due to the COVID-19 pandemic. Come the 500th episode, the area of the red sofa has been reconstructed with another red sofa added onto the current one.

No. in series	No. in season	Guest	Original air date	U.S. viewers (millions)
532	1	Chanel and Sterling CCII	September 15, 2020	0.17
533	2	Chanel and Sterling CCIII	September 16, 2020	0.32
534	3	Chanel and Sterling CCIV	September 17, 2020	0.32
535	4	Chanel and Sterling CCV	September 18, 2020	0.27
536	5	Chanel and Sterling CCVI	September 21, 2020	0.21
537	6	Chanel and Sterling CCVII	September 22, 2020	0.26
538	7	Chanel and Sterling CCVIII	September 23, 2020	0.23
539	8	Chanel and Sterling CCIX	September 24, 2020	0.24
540	9	Chanel and Sterling CCX	September 25, 2020	0.31
541	10	Chanel and Sterling CCXI	September 28, 2020	0.30
542	11	Chanel and Sterling CCXII	September 29, 2020	0.23
543	12	Chanel and Sterling CCXIII	September 30, 2020	0.30
544	13	Chanel and Sterling CCXIV	October 1, 2020	0.32
545	14	Chanel and Sterling CCXX	October 2, 2020	0.44
546	15	Chanel and Sterling CCXVI	October 5, 2020	0.30
547	16	Chanel and Sterling CCXVII	October 6, 2020	0.32
548	17	Chanel and Sterling CCXVIII	October 7, 2020	0.31
549	18	Chanel and Sterling CCXIX	October 8, 2020	0.24
550	19	The 500th Episode	October 9, 2020	0.38
551	20	Wells Adams	October 12, 2020	0.32
552	21	Chanel and Sterling CCXXI	October 13, 2020	0.22
553	22	Lauv	October 14, 2020	0.27
554	23	Chanel and Sterling CCXXII	October 15, 2020	0.21
555	24	Chanel and Sterling CCXXIII	October 16, 2020	0.28
556	25	America's Sweetheart	October 26, 2020	0.24
557	26	Chanel and Sterling CCXXIV	October 27, 2020	0.21
558	27	Chanel and Sterling CCXXV	October 28, 2020	0.26
559	28	Chanel's Birthday	October 29, 2020	0.21
560	29	Lamorne Morris	October 30, 2020	0.31
561	30	Chanel and Sterling CCXXVI	November 2, 2020	0.26
562	31	Chanel and Sterling CCXXVII	November 3, 2020	N/A
563	32	Chanel and Sterling CCXXVIII	November 4, 2020	0.29
564	33	Chanel and Sterling CCXXIX	November 5, 2020	0.25
565	34	Chanel and Sterling CCXXX	November 6, 2020	0.34
566	35	Chanel and Sterling CCXXXI	November 9, 2020	0.28
567	36	Chanel and Sterling CCXXXII	November 10, 2020	0.29
568	37	Chanel and Sterling CCXXXIII	November 11, 2020	0.27
569	38	Chanel and Sterling CCXXXIV	November 12, 2020	0.26
570	39	Chanel and Sterling CCXXXV	November 13, 2020	0.32
571	40	Chanel and Sterling CCXXXVI	November 16, 2020	0.19
572	41	Chanel and Sterling CCXXXVII	November 17, 2020	0.29
573	42	Chanel and Sterling CCXXXVIII	November 18, 2020	0.27
574	43	Chanel and Sterling CCXXIX	November 19, 2020	0.27

=== Season 19 (2020–21) ===
The season premiered on November 30, 2020 with guest Madison Beer II, and concluded on January 28, 2021 with guest Logan Paul.

No. in series	No. in season	Guest	Original air date	U.S. viewers (millions)
575	1	Madison Beer II	November 30, 2020	0.25
576	2	Chanel and Sterling CCXL	December 1, 2020	0.25
577	3	Chanel and Sterling CCXLI	December 2, 2020	0.29
578	4	Chanel and Sterling CCXLII	December 3, 2020	0.32
579	5	Chanel and Sterling CCXLIII	December 4, 2020	0.38
580	6	Chanel and Sterling CCXLIV	December 7, 2020	0.30
581	7	Chanel and Sterling CCXLV	December 8, 2020	0.19
582	8	Chanel and Sterling CCXLVI	December 9, 2020	0.21
583	9	Chanel and Sterling CCXLVII	December 10, 2020	0.30
584	10	Chanel and Sterling CCXLVIII	December 11, 2020	0.36
585	11	A Holly Jolly Ridiculousness	December 14, 2020	0.37
586	12	A Holly Jolly Ridiculousness II	December 14, 2020	0.38
587	13	A Holly Jolly Ridiculousness III	December 15, 2020	0.26
588	14	A Holly Jolly Ridiculousness IV	December 15, 2020	0.38
589	15	A Holly Jolly Ridiculousness V	December 16, 2020	0.28
590	16	A Holly Jolly Ridiculousness VI	December 16, 2020	0.31
591	17	A Holly Jolly Ridiculousness VII	December 17, 2020	0.33
592	18	A Holly Jolly Ridiculousness VIII	December 17, 2020	0.38
593	19	A Holly Jolly Ridiculousness IX	December 18, 2020	0.33
594	20	A Holly Jolly Ridiculousness X	December 18, 2020	0.36
595	21	Chanel and Sterling CCXLIX	December 21, 2020	0.37
596	22	Pauly Shore	December 22, 2020	0.33
597	23	Chanel and Sterling CCL	December 23, 2020	0.30
598	24	Chanel and Sterling CCLI	January 4, 2021	0.23
599	25	Chanel and Sterling CCLII	January 5, 2021	0.30
600	26	Chanel and Sterling CCLIII	January 6, 2021	0.25
601	27	Chanel and Sterling CCLIV	January 7, 2021	0.26
602	28	Chanel and Sterling CCLV	January 8, 2021	0.37
603	29	Chanel and Sterling CCLVI	January 11, 2021	0.21
604	30	Chanel and Sterling CCLVI	January 12, 2021	0.19
605	31	Chanel and Sterling CCLVII	January 13, 2021	0.29
606	32	Chanel and Sterling CCLVII	January 14, 2021	0.26
607	33	Chanel and Sterling CCLVIII	January 15, 2021	0.32
608	34	Chanel and Sterling CCLXI	January 18, 2021	0.28
609	35	Chanel and Sterling CCLXII	January 19, 2021	0.23
610	36	Chanel and Sterling CCLXIII	January 20, 2021	0.25
611	37	Chanel and Sterling CCLXIV	January 21, 2021	0.31
612	38	Chanel and Sterling CCLXV	January 22, 2021	0.33
613	39	Brendan Schaub IV	January 25, 2021	0.29
614	40	Reggie Watts	January 26, 2021	0.22
615	41	Chanel and Sterling CCLXVI	January 27, 2021	0.21
616	42	Logan Paul	January 28, 2021	0.29

=== Season 20 (2021) ===
The season premiered on MTV on February 8, 2021 with Chanel and Sterling CCLXVII, and concluded on April 18, 2021, with 2 episodes: Chanel and Sterling CCXCIX and Chanel and Sterling CCC.

No. in series	No. in season	Guest	Original air date	U.S. viewers (millions)
617	1	Chanel and Sterling CCLXVII	February 8, 2021	0.31
618	2	Peyton List	February 9, 2021	0.23
619	3	Brendan Schaub V	February 10, 2021	0.21
620	4	Jo Koy	February 11, 2021	0.34
621	5	Chanel and Sterling CCLXVIII	February 12, 2021	0.16
622	6	Jaleel White	February 15, 2021	0.27
623	7	Brendan Schaub VI	February 16, 2021	0.18
624	8	Chanel and Sterling CCLXIX	February 17, 2021	0.27
625	9	Chanel and Sterling CCLXX	February 18, 2021	0.29
626	10	Chanel and Sterling CCLXXI	February 19, 2021	0.38
627	11	Chanel and Sterling CCLXXII	February 26, 2021	0.37
628	12	Chanel and Sterling CCLXXIII	February 26, 2021	0.40
629	13	Chanel and Sterling CCLXXIV	February 28, 2021	0.54
630	14	Chanel and Sterling CCLXXV	February 28, 2021	0.51
631	15	Chanel and Sterling CCLXXVI	March 5, 2021	0.44
632	16	Chanel and Sterling CCLXXVII	March 5, 2021	0.44
633	17	Chanel and Sterling CCLXXVIII	March 7, 2021	0.32
634	18	Chanel and Sterling CCLXXIX	March 7, 2021	0.35
635	19	Chanel and Sterling CCLXXX	March 12, 2021	0.41
636	20	Chanel and Sterling CCLXXXI	March 12, 2021	0.43
637	21	Chanel and Sterling CCLXXXII	March 14, 2021	0.37
638	22	Chanel and Sterling CCLXXXIII	March 14, 2021	0.39
639	23	Chanel and Sterling CCLXXXIV	March 19, 2021	0.35
640	24	Chanel and Sterling CCLXXXV	March 19, 2021	0.37
641	25	Gabriel Iglesias	March 21, 2021	0.39
642	26	Chanel and Sterling CCLXXXVI	March 21, 2021	0.43
643	27	Eric Andre III	March 26, 2021	0.34
644	28	Chanel and Sterling CCLXXXVII	March 26, 2021	0.36
645	29	24kGoldn	March 28, 2021	0.37
646	30	Chanel and Sterling CCLXXXVIII	March 28, 2021	0.36
647	31	Chanel and Sterling CCXC	April 2, 2021	0.37
648	32	Chanel and Sterling CCXC	April 2, 2021	0.41
649	33	Chanel and Sterling CCXCI	April 4, 2021	0.36
650	34	Chanel and Sterling CCXCII	April 4, 2021	0.34
651	35	Chanel and Sterling CCXCIII	April 9, 2021	0.35
652	36	Chanel and Sterling CCXCIV	April 9, 2021	0.28
653	37	Chanel and Sterling CCXCV	April 11, 2021	0.39
654	38	Chanel and Sterling CCXCVI	April 11, 2021	0.34
655	39	Chanel and Sterling CCXCVII	April 16, 2021	0.39
656	40	Chanel and Sterling CCXCVIII	April 16, 2021	0.41
657	41	Chanel and Sterling CCXCIX	April 18, 2021	0.40
658	42	Chanel and Sterling CCC	April 18, 2021	0.39
