= List of Wild Grinders episodes =

This is a list of the Nicktoons series Wild Grinders. The series premiered on April 27, 2012. The second season previewed on December 23, 2013, and officially premiered on February 5, 2014, and ended on February 12, 2015.

== Series overview ==
Season	Episodes	Originally released	
Season	Episodes	First released	Last released
1	26	April 27, 2012	December 23, 2013
2	26	October 18, 2013	February 12, 2015

== Episodes ==
=== Season 1 (2012–13) ===
No. overall	No. in season	Title	Directed by	Written by	Original release date	Prod. code
1	1	"Deconstructed"	Unknown	Unknown	April 27, 2012 at 7:00pm	TBA
1	1	"Close-Up"	Unknown	Unknown	April 27, 2012 at 7:00pm	TBA
Lil' Rob and the rest of the Wild Grinders attempt to find a way to save their favorite skate spot from being destroyed when they learn that Stubford's dad intends to use the land to build a theme park/A hotshot higher-up at a local television network attempts to make Lil' Rob a reality star by casting him and the rest of the Wild Grinders in a variety of terrible reality shows
2	2	"Going Hollyweird"	Unknown	Unknown	May 4, 2012 at 7:00pm	TBA
2	2	"Shark Attack"	Unknown	Unknown	May 4, 2012 at 7:00pm	TBA
Lil' Rob is cast in a big budget skateboard movie/Lil' Rob heads underwater to skate with a giant shark and recover Pirate Brody's treasure
3	3	"Never Skate with Unicorns"	Unknown	Unknown	May 11, 2012	TBA
3	3	"Biggest Sell-Out"	Unknown	Unknown	May 11, 2012	TBA
Lil' Rob accidentally breaks his sister's prized glass unicorn/The Wild Grinders try to make sure that Emo Crys' art does not become commercial
4	4a 4b	"The Prince and the Skateboarder"	Ron Doucet	Mike Foulke	May 18, 2012	104a 104b
4	4a 4b	"Board Story"	Ron Doucet	Dan Danko & Tom K. Mason	May 18, 2012	104a 104b
Jack Knife trades places with his regal look-alike during a competition./The Wild Grinders' boards escape and make a new life with Stubford.
5	5a 5b	"Out of Tune"	Ron Doucet	Martin Olson	May 25, 2012	107a 107b
5	5a 5b	"Picnic of Doom"	Ron Doucet	Adam Peltzman	May 25, 2012	107a 107b
Lil' Rob and Denise seek out to embarrass one another./Lil' Rob and his father compete against Stubford and Track Hucksterball in the company picnic games.
6	6a 6b	"Neptune's Chowder"	Ron Doucet	Dan Danko & Tom K. Mason	June 8, 2012	109a 109b
6	6a 6b	"Squatch Grinders"	Ron Doucet	Christian Duguay	June 8, 2012	109a 109b
Lil' Rob and the Wild Grinders try to surf a giant wave nicknamed "Neptune's Chowder"./When Lil' Rob and Meaty capture Bigfoot, they try to make him a Wild Grinder.
7	7a 7b	"The Amaaaazing Adventures of Captain Grindstar"	Ron Doucet	Dan Danko & Tom K. Mason	June 15, 2012	106a 106b
7	7a 7b	"Lil' Red Riding Rob"	Ron Doucet	John Derevlany	June 15, 2012	106a 106b
Lil' Rob, Goggles and Meaty go on a rescue mission at a comic convention after Stubford captures Goggles' favorite comic book movie star./While babysitting a little boy for Denise, Lil' Rob attempts to get the child to sleep by creating an elaborate story.
8	8a 8b	"Space Race"	Ron Doucet	Dan Danko & Tom K. Mason	June 15, 2012	112a 112b
8	8a 8b	"Road Tripped"	Ron Doucet	Ann Austen	June 15, 2012	112a 112b
Lil' Rob, Meaty, and Jay Jay take a space shuttle to the Moon, where they encounter a bizarre creature living on the satellite./Lil' Rob is not allowed to skateboard and Denise is not allowed to use her phone while they and their family take a trip across the country to see the sights. Note: The mole that appears in 8A resembles the redesigned Zizrar on Johnny Test.
9	9a 9b	"Grindermania"	Ron Doucet	Adam Peltzman	June 22, 2012	108a 108b
9	9a 9b	"Crushin'"	Ron Doucet	Ursula Ziegler	June 22, 2012	108a 108b
The Wild Grinders make a music video and begin to gain fame as a rock band./Denise tries to learn how to skate so she can get Freddie's attention with the help of Lil' Rob.
10	10a 10b	"Jurassic Skate Park"	Ron Doucet	Dean Stefan	June 22, 2012	113a 113b
10	10a 10b	"The Chosen Bulldog"	Ron Doucet	Christian Duguay	June 22, 2012	113a 113b
Lil' Rob, Meaty, and Goggles encounter volcanoes, dinosaurs, and cavemen when they accidentally go back in time./Meaty must come to the rescue after a dog goes on a crime spree and steals Lil' Rob's skateboard.
11	11	"Gnarly Craft (Parts 1 & 2)"	Ron Doucet	Dan Danko & Tom K. Mason	June 29, 2012	111
The Wild Grinders must come to the rescue when Lil' Rob gets trapped in an online game.
12	12a 12b	"My Lil' Unicorn"	Ron Doucet	Dan Danko & Tom K. Mason	June 29, 2012	110a 110b
12	12a 12b	"Breakfast of Skaters"	Ron Doucet	Adam Peltzman	June 29, 2012	110a 110b
Denise's pet unicorn frames Meaty and gets him banished to the backyard./Lil' Rob wants to enter a video contest to become the face of SkateyOh's Cereal.
13	13a 13b	"The Skater Who Cried Wolf"	Ron Doucet	Russell Marcus	July 6, 2012	117a 117b
13	13a 13b	"Good Dog, Bad Dog Academy"	Ron Doucet	Christian Duguay	July 6, 2012	117a 117b
Lil' Rob begins to have suspicions that Meaty's new friend might be a werewolf./Lil' Rob and Meaty attend obedience school together, but problems arise when a strict drill sergeant begins to make them miserable.
14	14a 14b	"Meaty in Black"	Ron Doucet	Scott Gray	September 7, 2012	115a 115b
14	14a 14b	"Grinders of Invention"	Ron Doucet	Scott Gray	September 7, 2012	115a 115b
Special agents from Area 50 and 1/2 kidnap Meaty to use his drool in an evil plot to rule the world./When Goggles wins his own laboratory, he tries to impress his parents with wild inventions.
15	15a 15b	"Lil' Rob Roundup"	Ron Doucet	John Derevlany	September 14, 2012	116a 116b
15	15a 15b	"Wild Step Brothers"	Ron Doucet	Adam Peltzman	September 14, 2012	116a 116b
Goggles clones Lil' Rob so he can skate in two competitions and do all his chores./Lil' Rob's dad brings home Stubford for a week.
16	16a 16b	"Swaggerless"	Ron Doucet	Scott Gray	September 21, 2012	119a 119b
16	16a 16b	"Goggles Shrunk the Grinders"	Ron Doucet	Kent Redeker	September 21, 2012	119a 119b
Lil' Rob tries to hypnotize Goggles, but things backfire and now the Grinders need to find a way to reverse the hypnotism./Goggles creates a decreasinator to shrink skateboards to pocket-size, but the ray backfires and shrinks the Grinders.
17	17a 17b	"Preston Change-O"	Ron Doucet	John Derevlany	September 28, 2012	120a 120b
17	17a 17b	"Biggest Fan"	Ron Doucet	Thomas Krajewski	September 28, 2012	120a 120b
Lil' Rob learns a magic trick from Preston, the class magician, and accidentally switches bodies with Meaty./Lil' Rob’s new biggest fan quickly gets out of control when he starts to act and dress like Lil' Rob and as "Lil' Bob" starts to take over Lil' Rob's life.
18	18a 18b	"Substitute Secret Agent"	Ron Doucet	Christian Duguay	October 5, 2012	121a 121b
18	18a 18b	"Wild Scouts"	Ron Doucet	Scott Gray	October 5, 2012	121a 121b
When Lil' Rob mistakenly receives a secret spy package, he gears up with Goggles and Meaty to save a royal family./When the Grinders join the Sapling Scouts and get lost, it's up to Jay Jay to lead them on to The Ramplands.
19	19a 19b	"Wild Zombies"	Ron Doucet	Dan Danko & Tom K. Mason	October 26, 2012	105a 105b
19	19a 19b	"Scream a Little Scream"	Ron Doucet	Scott Gray	October 26, 2012	105a 105b
The Wild Grinders have a huge problem on Halloween when they carve a cursed pumpkin and find themselves transformed into horrible zombies./The Wild Grinders attempt to capture a ghost on film in a haunted house, but they are steadily picked off.
20	20a 20b	"Search for Master Sensei"	Ron Doucet	Dan Danko & Tom K. Mason	November 2, 2012	123a 123b
20	20a 20b	"Meaty's Royal Adventure"	Ron Doucet	Meghan McCarthy	November 2, 2012	123a 123b
Spitball's street ninja teacher is kidnapped./Meaty is named heir to the Royal Doghouse of Moronico.
21	21a 21b	"Hoopz Dreamz"	Ron Doucet	Dan Danko & Tom K. Mason	November 9, 2012	124a 124b
21	21a 21b	"Who's the Dummy, Dummy?"	Ron Doucet	Ursula Ziegler	November 9, 2012	124a 124b
The Wild Grinders take the place of Flipz and her teammates in a basketball game./Goggles gives up the Wild Grinders for a ventriloquist act.
22	22a 22b	"A World Gone Rad Awesome"	Ron Doucet	Dan Danko & Tom K. Mason	November 16, 2012	122a 122b
22	22a 22b	"Operation Supernova"	Ron Doucet	Andy Guerdat & Steve Sullivan	November 16, 2012	122a 122b
Lil' Rob travels to an alternate dimension./Lil' Rob, Meaty, and Goggles help Agent Capricorn deal with two evil agents.
23	23a 23b	"Skaters of Ollie"	Ron Doucet	Dan Danko & Tom K. Mason	November 20, 2012	118a 118b
23	23a 23b	"Grindstar Returns"	Ron Doucet	Dan Danko & Tom K. Mason	November 20, 2012	118a 118b
A tornado transports Lil' Rob and Meaty to the land of Ollie./Captain Grindstar asks Lil' Rob, Meaty, and Goggles to watch his pet goldfish. However, things go spoiled when Stubford steals him.
24	24a 24b	"Grinder Claus"	Ron Doucet	Dan Danko & Tom K. Mason	December 3, 2012	114a 114b
24	24a 24b	"Merry Grindernukamas"	Ron Doucet	Meghan McCarthy	December 3, 2012	114a 114b
Even Santa Claus has a Christmas wish: he wants to skateboard with Lil' Rob! But when Santa falls and can't fly the sled, can the gang deliver all his presents?/Lil' Rob thinks holiday cheer has gone missing, so he and the gang create a new holiday: Grindernukamas! However, making a new holiday isn't as easy as it looks.
25	25a 25b	"Take Me to Your Stubford"	Ron Doucet	Dan Danko & Tom K. Mason	February 15, 2013	126a 126b
25	25a 25b	"Emo's Mystery Girl"	Ron Doucet	Ann Austen	February 15, 2013	126a 126b
Lil' Rob and Stubford are abducted by aliens./Emo Crys is nervous about meeting a girl that he has only talked to online.
26	26a 26b	"Board Senseless"	Ron Doucet	Story by : Scott Gray; Teleplay by : Dan Danko & Tom K. Mason	December 23, 2013	125a 125b
26	26a 26b	"Big Top Rob"	Ron Doucet	Andy Guerdat & Steve Sullivan	December 23, 2013	125a 125b
To win the RadStar X5 skateboard back from Denise, the Grinders must give up skating for a week./Lil' Rob and the Wild Grinders must save the show when Jack Knife’s family circus comes to town.

=== Season 2 (2013–15) ===
No. overall	No. in season	Title	Directed by	Written by	Original release date	Prod. code
27	1	"Texas Skateboard Horrorland Zombie Activity 3 (Parts 1 & 2)"	Rod Amador	Dan Danko & Tom K. Mason	October 18, 2013	201
Lil' Rob and the Wild Grinders must save the show when Jack Knife’s family circus comes to town.
28	2a 2b	"Grindbox 1080: Start (Part 1)"	Rod Amador	Dan Danko & Tom K. Mason	February 5, 2014	202a 202b
28	2a 2b	"Grindbox 1080: Game Over (Part 2)"	Rod Amador	Dan Danko & Tom K. Mason	February 5, 2014	202a 202b
Lil' Rob goes inside a video game to save Stubford. Lil' Rob and Stubford must power through levels to escape the video game world.
29	3a 3b	"The Secret Life of Spitball"	Rod Amador	Dan Danko & Tom K. Mason	February 12, 2014	203a 203b
29	3a 3b	"Backstage Grinders: The Reunion Tour"	Rod Amador	Dan Danko & Tom K. Mason	February 12, 2014	203a 203b
When the gang realizes Spitball’s life outside the Grinders is a complete mystery, they decide to follow him for the day. Lil' Rob and Meaty discover that he’s up to some pretty rad adventures!/When a new teen idol threatens the popularity of the Backside Grinders, Lil' Rob has no choice but to get the dudes back together to defend their musical honor! It's an epic battle of the boy band idols!
30	4a 4b	"Survivored"	Rod Amador	Dan Danko & Tom K. Mason	February 19, 2014	204a 204b
30	4a 4b	"Fast Times at Sprawl City Middle School"	Rod Amador	Doug Molitor	February 19, 2014	204a 204b
When the Wild Grinders get stranded on a deserted island, Lil' Rob does his best to turn it into a boarder’s paradise – until Stubford washes up./Lil' Rob is always late ... until he hops on Goggles' new Hyper Turbo board! But when he kicks it up to 11, will Lil' Rob get stuck at hyper speed forever?
31	5a 5b	"The League of Xtraordinary Sk8ers"	Rod Amador	Steve Sullivan	February 26, 2014	205a 205b
31	5a 5b	"Wild Grinders, Assemble!"	Rod Amador	Dan Danko & Tom K. Mason	February 26, 2014	205a 205b
Todd Topdeck invites Lil' Rob into The League of Xtraordinary Sk8ers, but Lil' Rob will have to take his skate stunts to a whole new level to stay in the league./A group of aliens attack the earth after they think Goggle's heat wave blast shooter was a war starting signal.
32	6a 6b	"Pen Pal from Another Planet"	Rod Amador	Rob Tinkler	March 5, 2014	206a 206b
32	6a 6b	"Roman Grinders"	Rod Amador	Doug Molitor	March 5, 2014	206a 206b
Lil' Rob is suspicious of Jack Knife's new pen pal friend./The Grinders get sent into the past to Rome and must get back Goggles' skate time machine to get back to the present.
33	7a 7b	"The Luck of the Grindish"	Rod Amador	Ursula Ziegler	March 12, 2014	211a 211b
33	7a 7b	"Bend it Like a Grinder"	Rod Amador	David Shayne	March 12, 2014	211a 211b
A leprechaun tricks the Grinders and Meaty./Goggle creates bendable skateboards, but that boards come alive and rebel against the Grinders.
34	8a 8b	"Treasure of the Sierra Sprawl"	Rod Amador	Dan Danko & Tom K. Mason	March 19, 2014	207a 207b
34	8a 8b	"Special Delivery"	Rod Amador	Rob Tinkler	March 19, 2014	207a 207b
The Grinders embark on a treasure hunt./The Grinders compete with the Fixees to become Papa Calzoni's new pizza delivery crew.
35	9a 9b	"The Tell Tale Board"	Rod Amador	Derek Dressler	March 26, 2014	208a 208b
35	9a 9b	"It's Not My Asphalt"	Rod Amador	Patrick Andrew O'Connor	March 26, 2014	208a 208b
When Meaty accidentally destroys Lil' Rob's new skateboard, he then lies about it./Goggles creates "Smart Asphalt" for smooth skating.
36	10a 10b	"Dr. Jekyll and Mr. Grinder"	Rod Amador	Derek Dressler	April 2, 2014	209a 209b
36	10a 10b	"Skate or Sick"	Rod Amador	Eric Rivera	April 2, 2014	209a 209b
There's a new exchange student in staying with Emo Crys, Skidoosh, who seems very reserved. If only Skidoosh could be more like the other new kid, Flingo Jalapeno, who's a total gonzo daredevil skater. But Lil Rob and the Wild Grinders are shocked to discover that Skidoosh and Flingo are the same kid./Lil Rob makes up a barely believable mystery disease to get out of going to Tool Con with Gene, but the soon the whole town is infected and quarantined.
37	11a 11b	"The Big Sleep… Over"	Rod Amador	Dan Danko & Tom K. Mason	April 9, 2014	210a 210b
37	11a 11b	"Lil Rob'n Hood"	Rod Amador	Doug Molitor	April 9, 2014	210a 210b
Lil Rob and Meaty are faced with horrible news when they find out that Patty arranged for a play date with Stubford. But Lil Rob and Meaty agree to go because they want to get a photo of Stubford's mysterious mom, whom urban legends says no one has ever seen./A discussion of the Wild Grinders' famous relatives reveals that Lil Rob is related to the legendary Lil Rob'n Hood, who stole burritos from the king and gave them to his hungry friends. At least that's how Lil Rob tells the story that he stars in.
38	12a 12b	"School Daze"	Rod Amador	Dan Danko & Tom K. Mason	April 16, 2014	212a 212b
38	12a 12b	"Grindergeddon"	Rod Amador	Richard Clark	April 16, 2014	212a 212b
Lil' Rob convinces Gene and Patty that he should be home schooled./The Wild Grinders take a space shuttle to an asteroid so they can skate in a low gravity environment.
39	13a 13b	"Wild Grinder With Two Heads"	Rod Amador	Derek Dressler	April 23, 2014	213a 213b
39	13a 13b	"The Legend of Jilly"	Rod Amador	Derek Dressler	April 23, 2014	213a 213b
Emo Crys and Jay Jay are combined in one body and two heads, after they have fighting each other for Goggles' ray gun./A creature was terrorizing Sprawl City, and Denise thought that creature was her baby alligator, Jilly. the Grinders must venture out to the sewers to find her missing alligator.
40	14a 14b	"Midas Touch"	Rod Amador	Unknown	September 3, 2014	225a 225b
40	14a 14b	"Pre-Teen Mutated Karate Warrior"	Rod Amador	Unknown	September 3, 2014	225a 225b
To a disappointment, Goggles is the only Grinder to have no popularity, but when an ultimate skater named Shecky comes by, who is also a former nerd, he helps Goggles to gain his "coolness"./Lil Rob and Meaty discovers that a pet turtle, Gary, is secretly a warrior. Unfortunately, he lost the battle against Mr. Chews. Can Rob and Meaty help him?
41	15a 15b	"The Amaazing Racers"	Rod Amador	Dan Danko & Tom K. Mason	September 10, 2014	215a 215b
41	15a 15b	"Wild Wild Mess"	Rod Amador	Doug Molitor	September 10, 2014	215a 215b
Lil Rob and Meaty competes against Stubford Hucksterball and Officer Lackowski into a global car race to win bacon-wrapped tacos./Stubford decides to evilly rewrite the history of Sprawl City Canyon, and the Grinders plan to stop him from destroying the canyon's original history.
42	16a 16b	"Grindinator"	Rod Amador	Richard Clark & Kevin Currie	September 17, 2014	216a 216b
42	16a 16b	"Grinder of Another Dimension"	Rod Amador	Steven Sullivan & Patricia Ross	September 17, 2014	216a 216b
Goggles' invention, the Gog 101, goes out of control starts to attack the future Sprawl City. Lil Rob's look-alike grandson goes back in time to help them stop the futuristic skateboard from destroying his future home./Preston sends Jay Jay to another dimension. With his aid to the Grinders, they must face off with a germ-free vacuum.
43	17a 17b	"Fists of Justice: The Beginning"	Rod Amador	Dan Danko & Tom K. Mason	September 24, 2014	218a 218b
43	17a 17b	"Lil Rob & the Beanstalk"	Rod Amador	Dan Danko & Tom K. Mason	September 24, 2014	218a 218b
Captain Grindstar holds an audition for new superheroes, but when a breed of aliens decide to attack Earth, the Grinders team up with Grindstar./Because of Jack Knife's own fault that he trades his only skateboard to Preston, he grows a beanstalk that lead Lil Rob and the gang to an enormous castle, where the Stubford-like giant lives.
44	18a 18b	"Demolition Man, Man"	Rod Amador	Derek Dressler	October 1, 2014	224a 224b
44	18a 18b	"Hair Today, Gone Tomorrow"	Rod Amador	Patrick Andrew O'Connor	October 1, 2014	224a 224b
Jack Knife competes his rivalry idol, Crash Basher, into a skating derby competition./The new skater, Lil Nyjah, was possessed by an alien hair, which makes his mood stranger than ever. After the Grinders were infected by the alien hair, Lil Rob and Meaty are the only ones to save them from this madness.
45	19a 19b	"Cat Scratch Meaty"	Rob Amador	Derek Dressler	October 8, 2014	217a
45	19a 19b	"Wild BFF's"	Rob Amador	Dan Danko & Tom K. Mason	October 8, 2014	217a
Meaty disguises himself as a cat, in order to get himself famous./Jack Knife breaks up with the Grinders, and helps Stubford by becoming his "big brother".
46	20a 20b	"A Mole Lot of Trouble"	Rod Amador	Dan Danko & Tom K. Mason	October 15, 2014	223a 223b
46	20a 20b	"Redonkulousness"	Rod Amador	Dan Danko & Tom K. Mason	October 15, 2014	223a 223b
The Mole King and his minions invade the Dyrdeks' house, because they despise the noises from the Lot. Rob, Patty, and Gene (except for Denise, who is heir to be the Mole Queen) were stuck outside to survive./Jack Knife becomes an internet personality, after crashing towards a donkey, causing a show to be invented by Todd Topdeck. Despite his fame, he is challenged by a roller-skating chicken.
47	21a 21b	"Web Wars"	Rod Amador	Eric Rivera	November 5, 2014	219a 219b
47	21a 21b	"When You Grind Upon a Star"	Rod Amador	Patrick Andrew O'Connor	November 5, 2014	219a 219b
Without hits on Denise's video channel, she grew jealous and plans to sabotage the Grinders' webcast with her "Epic Fail Live Feed"./Goggles' invention, Jagger 2.0, accidentally sprang to life, wanting Lil Rob and the Grinders to help him to become a real boy.
48	22a 22b	"Mr. Dogfyre"	Rod Amador	Dan Danko & Tom K. Mason	November 19, 2014	221a 221b
48	22a 22b	"Blast from the Past"	Rod Amador	Eric Rivera	November 19, 2014	221a 221b
Introduced by Trevor, a dog who is talented of percussion, Meaty gets envious with him joining the Backside Grinders. He disguises himself as Mr. Dogfyre to expel Trevor so he can drum again./Lil Rob and Meaty discovers an old first place trophy for a skating contest, thinking that Gene receives it. Lil Rob lends Goggles' time machine to warp to a year where Gene's pre-adolescent self lives. Rob and Meaty, sadly, finds out that 11-year-old Gene is not a talented skater, which soon changes the present day.
49	23a 23b	"Getting Cheezy"	Rod Amador	N/A	December 3, 2014	220a 220b
49	23a 23b	"Grindy the Snowman"	Rod Amador	Eric Shaw	December 3, 2014	220a 220b
Lil Rob meets his cousin Virgil, who wishes to have a normal life. So, Rob and Virgil switches places to fulfill his wish; however, Rob was accidentally challenged by a rap battle with DJ Tater-naise./The snowman that the Grinders build comes to life and makes snow days even longer.
50	24a 24b	"Wild Grinder Style"	Rod Amador	Patick Andrew O'Connor	December 10, 2014	214a 214b
50	24a 24b	"Call of the Wild Grinders"	Rod Amador	N/A	December 10, 2014	214a 214b
Lil Rob's dancing technique on video becomes an internet fame, getting himself dragged to a world tour, with a horde of fans not allowing him to skate./The Grinders take a trip to the mountain, where they are transported to another world, where talking woodland animals decided to let them stay for eternity.
51	25a 25b	"Lights, Camera, Denise!"	Rod Amador	Unknown	February 12, 2015	222a 222b
51	25a 25b	"Gas Knight"	Rod Amador	Unknown	February 12, 2015	222a 222b
Denise has been invited to be starred at a movie, but with an interruption of a robot "prop"./Meaty, known as a superhero named Gas Knight, gets challenged by an envious Stubford to a skate-off that allows gas-powered skateboards.
52	26	"Great Wheels of Fire (Parts 1 & 2)"	Rod Amador	Dan Danko & Tom K. Mason	February 12, 2015	226
Series Finale. The Grinders are captured by Fong Say Yuck, and it is up to Lil Rob to save them, along with the help of Spitball's astral projection, and later Stubford. They must find the guides of the Wolf Spirit and Dragon Spirit, who would help them to discover the Great Wheels of Fire, a legendary skateboard.
