= Cymphonique Miller =

American singer and actress (born 1996)

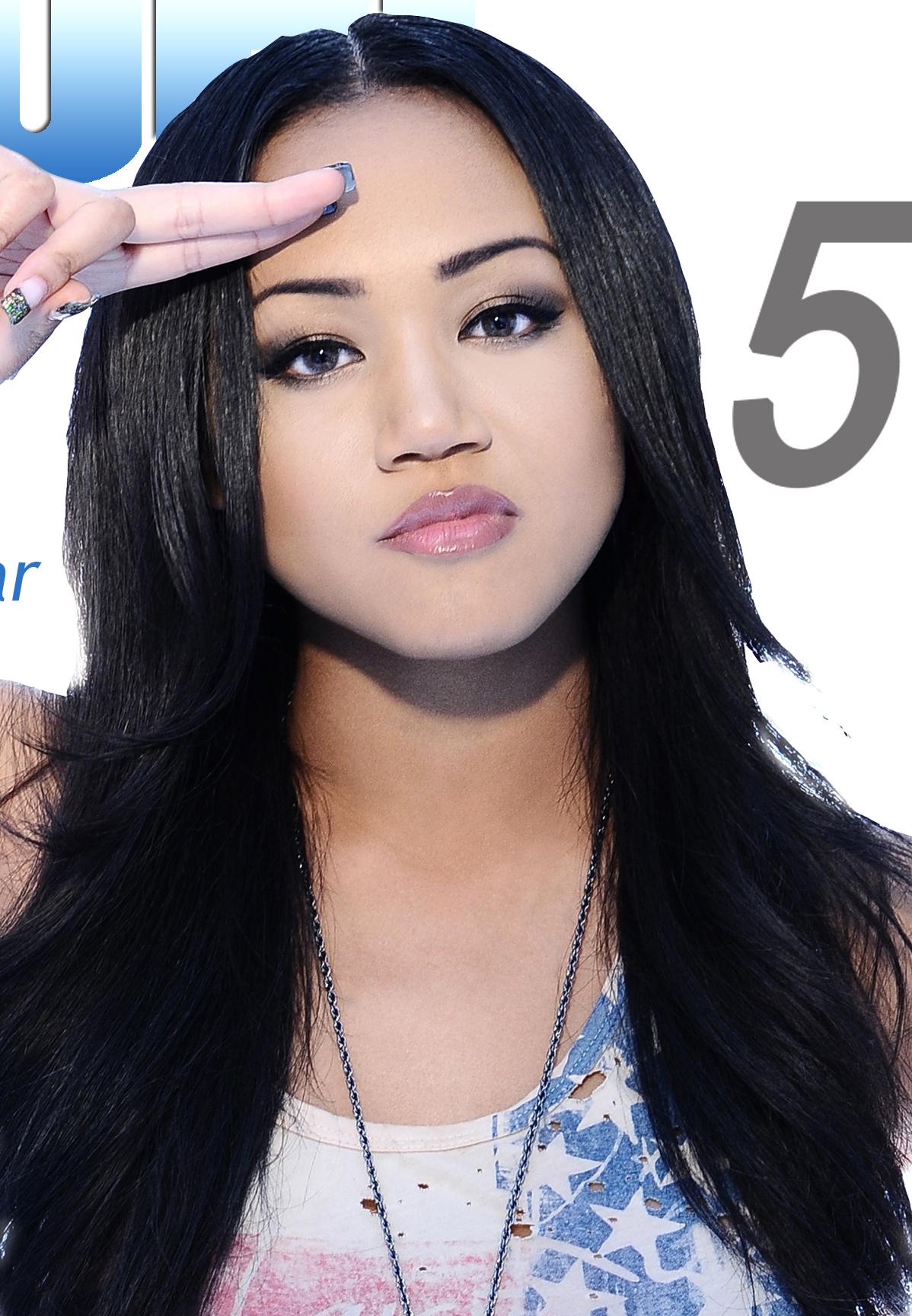
- Miller in 2012
- Born: August 1, 1996 (age 30)
- Father: Master P
- Relatives: Romeo Miller (brother); C-Murder (uncle); Silkk the Shocker (uncle); Mo B. Dick (cousin)
- Musical career
- Also known as: Cymphonique
- Origin: Los Angeles, California, U.S.
- Genres: Hip hop; R&B; pop
- Occupations: Singer; actress
- Years active: 2007–present
- Labels: No Limit Forever; Columbia

Cymphonique Miller (born August 1, 1996), known professionally by her mononym Cymphonique, is an American singer and actress. She is the daughter of Master P and is the younger sister of Romeo Miller (a.k.a. Romeo). She is known for her leading role as Kacey Simon on the Nickelodeon sitcom How to Rock, as well as her voice role as Krystal in the Nickelodeon version of Winx Club.

== Career ==
=== Early career and guest appearances ===
Miller has performed on several national tours and in theme parks across the United States. She has also toured with Raven-Symoné, Ashley Tisdale, Demi Lovato, JoJo, Wonder Girls, and College Boyys.

She was a finalist in Radio Disney's Next Big Thing but came in second place to Jasmine. Her songs "Butterflies", "Lil Miss Swagger" and "Daddy I'm A Rockstar" received airplay on Radio Disney. The music video for "Lil Miss Swagger," released when she was 12 years old, received more than 11 million YouTube views. Miller has guest-starred on Big Time Rush, True Jackson, VP, The Troop and Just Jordan.

=== Music and acting careers (2011–present) ===
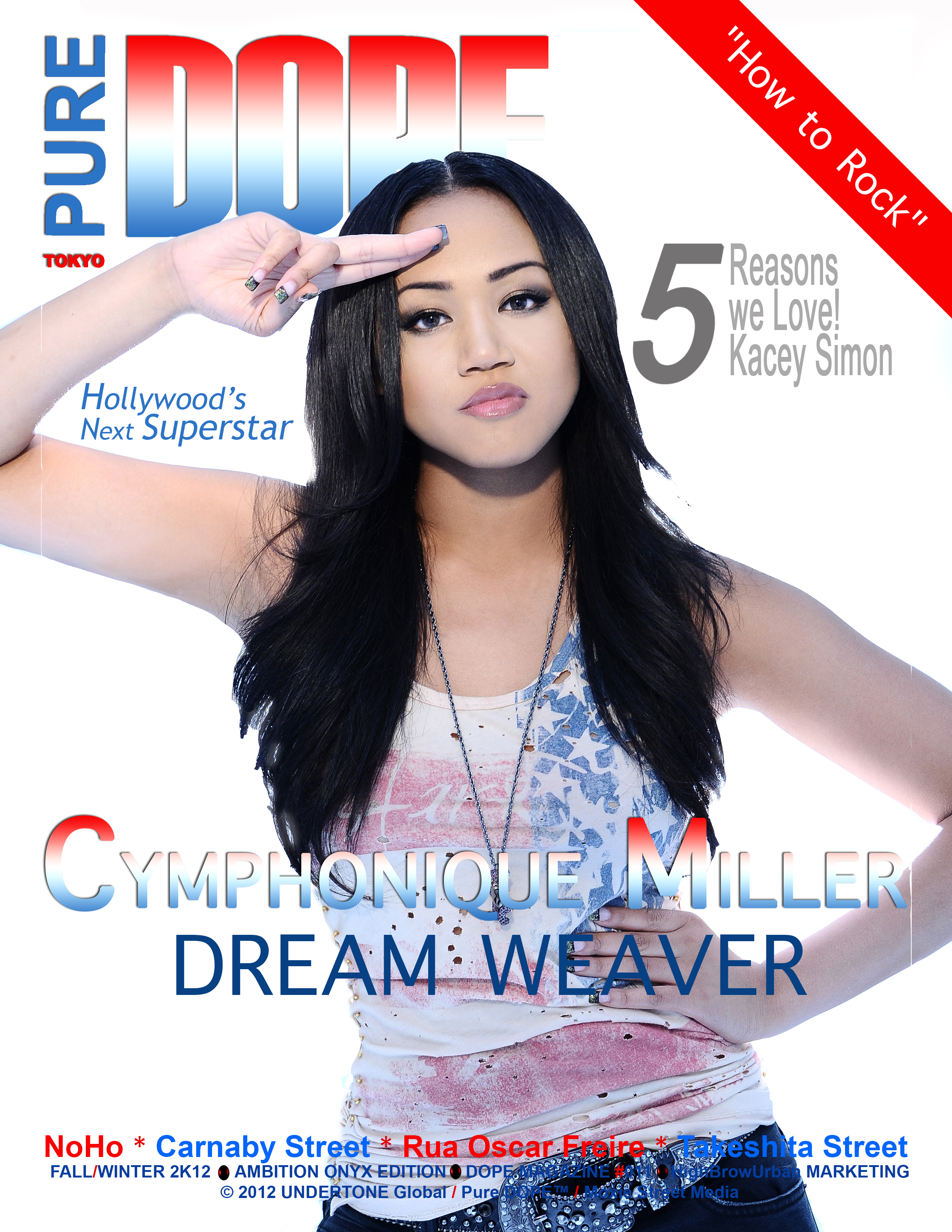
Miller on a cover of Pure DOPE magazine in 2012

In 2012, Miller starred the lead and contributed to the music for the Nickelodeon series How to Rock along with Lulu Antariksa.

The show lasted one season. She sang the theme song to Nickelodeon's Winx Club revival series, which premiered on Nickelodeon in June 2011. She was also the voice of Princess Krystal on the series. She is featured on the Big Time Rush song, "I Know You Know".

In 2011, Miller was nominated for "Best Female Hip-Hop Artist" at the BET Awards.

On July 7, 2012, Miller performed the halftime show at the Los Angeles Sparks' Girl Scouts night at The Staples Center.

Miller appeared on Mad TV, in numerous national commercials, and in public service announcements. In 2013, she released a mixtape entitled Passion.

The same year, she appeared in the film The Demsey Sisters along with Lynn Whitfield and Denyce Lawton.

== Personal life ==
Cymphonique is the daugher of rapper and entrepreneur Master P. Her half-brother is rapper Romeo Miller. She is a niece of rappers C-Murder and Silkk the Shocker through her father's side, with the latter being her mother's brother-in-law, and the cousin of producer, singer, and rapper Mo B. Dick.

Miller is Catholic.

== Filmography ==
Year	Title	Role	Notes
2007	Just Jordan	Karla	Episode: "Fist of Funny"
2007	Scarecrow Joe	Molly	Short film
2008	Internet Dating	Kid 1	Direct-to-video film
2008–10	Phineas and Ferb	Holly	Recurring voice role (Seasons 1–2)
2009	Opposite Day	Kid Judge Foggerty	Independent film
2010	True Jackson, VP	Bernadette "Bernie"	Episode: "True Magic"
2011	The Mo'Nique Show	Herself	Guest star
2011	Big Time Rush	Kat	Episode: "Big Time Girl Group"
2011	The Troop	Sharla Hammer	Episode: "The Prisoner of Lakewood"
2011–13	Winx Club	Princess Krystal; Nova	Recurring voice roles (Seasons 3 and 5)
2012	How to Rock	Kacey Simon	Lead role
2012	Figure It Out	Herself	Panelist
2013	The Dempsey Sisters	Tina Dempsey	Film
2019	I Got the Hook Up 2	Trish	Film
2020	Never and Again	Gabrielle	Film
TBA	Eyes of Esca	Jade	Film

== Discography ==
=== Mixtapes ===
Title	Details	Track list
Passion	Release date: June 25, 2013; Label: No Limit Forever; Formats: Digital download	1. It's My Party; 2. Talk to Me; 3. Slow Down (feat. Clyde Carson); 4. How It's Supposed to Feel; 5. Turn Up Time; 6. It's Your Birthday; 7. Independent; 8. Thinking About You; 9. Unhuman; 10. Do It Right; 11. Murda She Wrote

=== Extended plays ===
Title	Details	Track list
No Days Off	Release date: January 22, 2018; Label: No Limit Forever; Formats: Digital download	1. Since Jordan; 2. Drippin'; 3. Hold You Down; 4. Can't Wait; 5. South Beach; 6. Rain Drops; 7. Air 2 Fire

=== Singles ===
Title	Year	Album
"Takin' Over"	2008	Non-album single
"Lil' Miss Swaggar"	2009	Fabulous Girl
"One Life To Love"	2009	Fabulous Girl
"Follow Your Dream"	2009	Fabulous Girl
"Star Of The Show"	2009	Fabulous Girl
"I Heart You"	2009	Fabulous Girl
"Only You Can Be You" (with How To Rock Cast)"	2011	Non-album singles
"Move With The Crowd" (with How To Rock Cast)"	2012	Non-album singles
"All About Tonight" (with How To Rock Cast)"	2012	Non-album singles
"Nobody Like You" (featuring Jacob Latimore)	2012	Non-album singles
"It's My Party"	2013	Passion
"Talk To Me"	2013	Passion
"Turn Up Time"	2013	Passion
"Independent"	2013	Passion
"Murda She Wrote"	2013	Passion
"It's Your Birthday"	2013	Passion
"How It's Supposed To Feel"	2013	Passion
"Do It Right"	2013	Passion
"Thinking About You"	2013	Passion
"Unhuman"	2013	Passion
"My Everything"	2013	Non-album singles
"Baby Baby"	2014	Non-album singles
"Change"	2015	Non-album singles
"Thinking Bout U (featuring Ace B)	2015	Non-album singles
"Rain Drops"	2015	No Days Off
"Been Through It All" (featuring Moe Roy)	2016	Non-album single
"Drippin"	2017	No Days Off
"Hold You Down"	2017	No Days Off
"Since Jordan"	2017	No Days Off
"Do Dat Dance"	2018	Non-album singles
"Broken Promises"	2019	Non-album singles
"Can We Talkk"	2023	TBA
"Pressure"	2023	TBA
"Never 2 Much"	2024	TBA

=== As featured artist ===
Title	Year	Album
"I Luv You" (Lil King featuring Cymphonique)	2009	Non-album single
"Butterflies" (Fabulous Girls featuring Cymphonique)	2009	Fabulous Girl
"Show Me" (Miss Chee featuring Cymphonique)	2012	Non-album single
"You Need Me and I Need You" (Master P featuring Cymphonique)	2016	The G Mixtape

=== Promotional singles ===
Title	Year	Album
"All I Want For Christmas Is You"	2009	Non-album singles
"Let's Dance"	2012	Non-album singles
"Uh Uh"	2012	Non-album singles
"Crazy"	2012	Non-album singles
"Slow Down" (featuring Clyde Carson)	2013	Passion
"South Beach"	2016	No Days Off
"Into You"	2017	Non-album singles
"Between Us" (featuring Jeremih)	2017	Non-album singles

=== Guest appearances ===
Year	Song	Other artist(s)	Album
2010	"I Know You Know"	Big Time Rush	BTR
2012	"Sleigh Ride"	Nickelodeon Cast	Merry Nickmas
2012	"Deck The Halls"	How To Rock Cast	Merry Nickmas
2013	"Holding Back The Years"	Master P	The Gift
2016	"U Need Me	Master P	Louisiana Hot Sauce
2016	"Addickted"	Master P	Louisiana Hot Sauce
2017	"Thinkin' About You"	Ace B47	Ace Of Spades
2018	"What U Do"	Tony Montana, Kay Klover	Balls & My Word
2018	"What U Do"	Master P, Kay Klover	Tony Montana

=== Music videos ===
Year	Song	Director
2009	"Lil' Miss Swaggar"	Unknown
2010	"Soldier Girl"	Unknown
2011	"All That (Feat Romeo Miller &Lil P-Nut)"	Unknown
2011	"Daddy I'm A Rockstar"	Unknown
2011	"Only You Can Be You (with How To Rock Cast)"	Unknown
2012	"Nobody Like You (feat. Jacob Latimore)"	Master P & Hak
2013	"It's My Party"	Hak
2013	"Murda She Wrote"	Hak
2015	"Thinking About U (Ft. Ace B)"	Benmarc
2017	"Drippin"	Josh Sikkema
2017	Hold You Down"	Unknown
2017	"Since Jordan"	Unknown
2019	"I Needa Soulja"	BenMarc

=== As featured artist ===
Title	Year	Main artist(s)	Director(s)
"Butterflies"	2009	Fabulous Girls	Unknown
"Something"	2011	Fabulous Girls	Unknown
