= Wild Grinders =

American animated TV series

- Genre: Comedy; Skateboarding
- Created by: Rob Dyrdek
- Developed by: Christian Duguay
- Voices of: Rob Dyrdek; Sterling "Steelo" Brim; Kel Mitchell; Cam Clarke; Yuri Lowenthal; Chelsea Chanel Dudley; Erin Fitzgerald; Lee Harrell
- Theme music composer: Jaco Caraco; Todd M. Schultz; Bill Schultz
- Composer: Anna M. Rice
- Countries of origin: United States; Canada; Ireland; Hong Kong (season 1); Philippines (season 2)
- Original language: English
- No. of seasons: 2
- No. of episodes: 52 (101 segments) (list of episodes)

Production
- Executive producers: Rob Dyrdek; Tracy Tubera; Bill Schultz; Paul Cummins; Jeremy Larner; Steven Ching (season 1); Paul Rigg (season 1); Nicolas Atlan (season 1); Mike Young (season 1); Wayne Dearing (season 2); Geoffrey Taylor (season 2)
- Producers: Ruth Vincent; Juan Cruz Baldassarre (season 1); Siobhán Ní Ghadhra (season 1); Rick Morrison (season 2); Enda Boner (season 2); Stella Dearing (season 2)
- Running time: 22 minutes (2 11-minute segments)
- Production companies: Home Plate Entertainment; Telegael; Four Down Productions (season 1); MoonScoop Entertainment (season 1); Agogo Media (season 1); Copernicus Studios (season 1); Superjacket Productions (season 2); Top Draw Animation (season 2); Big Jump Entertainment (season 2)

Original release
- Network: Nicktoons; Kabillion (shorts)
- Release: April 27, 2012 – February 12, 2015

Rob Dyrdek's Wild Grinders, also known simply as Wild Grinders, is an animated television series created by, produced by and loosely based on the life of professional skateboarder and reality television star Rob Dyrdek. It started out as a series of shorts produced by MoonScoop Entertainment in 2009 and aired on Kabillion and Nicktoons which were adapted into a toy-line from Mattel that released in 2010.

Following the shorts and merchandise line, a full series of 22-minute episodes was distributed by MoonScoop Entertainment and aired on Nicktoons in 2012. The show made its second broadcast on U.S. television on April 27, 2012. During this time, content featuring the Wild Grinders characters continued to be seen on Kabillion, a video on demand channel and streaming video website partially owned by MoonScoop.

On August 1, 2013, Rob Dyrdek confirmed a second season with 26 episodes which premiered on Nicktoons on December 23, 2013.

Rob Dyrdek partnered with Teletoon to create a two-parter Halloween special, titled "Texas Skateboard Horrorland Zombie Activity 3", which aired on October 24, 2013 on Teletoon in Canada.

== Synopsis ==
This skateboard themed series features the skateboarding pre-teen Lil' Rob (based on the series creator) and his best friends: Meaty, a bulldog with a hip edge (based on Meaty, a dog that the real Rob Dyrdek owns); Goggles, Rob's nerdy best friend; and a host of other kids from the neighborhood, as well as Lil' Rob's parents and older teenage sister.

== Characters ==
=== Main ===
- Lil' Rob (voiced by Rob Dyrdek) – Lil' Rob is the titular character and the leader of the Wild Grinders. He is an upbeat pre-adolescent with an adventurous personality.
- Meaty (voiced by Sterling "Steelo" Brim (season 1), Lee Harrell (season 2) – Lil' Rob's anthropomorphic British bulldog.
- Goggles (voiced by Yuri Lowenthal, credited as Jimmy Benedict) – Lil' Rob's nerdy and loyal friend.
- Emo Crys (voiced by Cam Clarke, Charlie Schlatter in pilot episodes (uncredited)) – The poetic and sensitive of the Wild Grinders.
- Jay Jay (voiced by Kel Mitchell) – An intelligent hipster. He was portrayed to have mysophobia. He's the Backside Grinders' keyboard player.
- Jack Knife (voiced by Yuri Lowenthal) – A dull kid with a big heart. He plays electric guitar in the band which he initially used as a saxophone.
- Spitball (voiced by Yuri Lowenthal) – The silent type and dubbed as Street Ninja. He's the Backside bass player.
- Stubford Hucksterball (voiced by Erin Fitzgerald) – The main antagonist of the entire series. He is a child with a short height, but summons his mechanical stalls to make him taller than the Grinders.
- Flipz (voiced by Chelsea Chanel Dudley) – The only female skater in the Wild Grinders.

=== Recurring ===
- Denise (voiced by Erin Fitzgerald) – Lil' Rob's older sister.
- Lackey (voiced by Yuri Lowenthal) or Officer Lackowski, as he prefers, is Stubford's rent-a-cop sidekick hired by Track to keep Stubford out of his hair.
- Gene (voiced by Rob Dyrdek) – Lil' Rob's father.
- Patty (voiced by Erin Fitzgerald) – Lil' Rob's mother. She is also secretly a secret agent called Agent Capricorn.
- Track Hucksterball (voiced by Cam Clarke) – Stubford's wealthy, money-grubbing and neglectful father and also Gene's boss.
- Chip Fligginton (voiced by Kel Mitchell) – A famous web personality.
- Queen of Moronico (voiced by Kel Mitchell) – She is the queen of the fictional country of Moronico.
- Prince of Moronico (voiced by Yuri Lowenthal) – The prince of Moronico.
- Jankins (voiced by Cam Clarke) – The royal butler to the royal family.
- Freddie (voiced by Cam Clarke) – The desire of Denise's affection and also runs the Taco truck.
- Captain Grindstar (voiced by Tracy Tubera) – Goggles' superhero idol.
- Agents 1 and Agent 2 (voiced by Erin Fitzgerald and Cam Clarke) - Two black ops agents who work for Area 52. They often conspire take over or destroy the world.
- Mr. Sprinkles is Flips' pet wiener dog and Meaty's rival in pawjitsu.
- Squeak (voiced by Yuri Lowenthal) is a character who debuted in "Emo's Mystery Girl".

== Production ==
Wild Grinders is produced by Home Plate Entertainment and Telegael Teoranta, who co-own copyright to the series. MoonScoop Entertainment, Four Down Productions, Agogo Media and Copernicus Studios co-produced the first season, while Superjacket Productions, Top Draw Animation and Big Jump Entertainment co-produced the second season.

== Episodes ==
Season	Episodes	Originally released	
Season	Episodes	First released	Last released
1	26	April 27, 2012	December 23, 2013
2	26	October 18, 2013	February 12, 2015

== Mobile game ==
In June 2014, it was announced that a Wild Grinders mobile game was being developed for iPhone, iPad and Android by Bubble Gum Interactive. The game was slated to launch in September 2014, but instead was launched on February 11, 2015. The mobile game was titled Wild Grinders Downhill Grind.

== 7-Eleven location ==
In 2011, a 7-Eleven location was customized to promote Wild Grinders. The cost for the customization was $250,000. The outside walls were customized in a graffiti mural by several local artists, including Maxx242 to promote Wild Grinders. The location stayed customized temporarily before being remodeled to normal with 7-Eleven speaking "As well as we had made a donation to the skate park, which was right by one of our stores, so for several months it had several cool graphics on the inside and on the outside but we always intended to go back to a normal looking 7-11."

== Reception ==
Wild Grinders received generally negative reviews from critics. Emily Ashby of Common Sense Media gave the series 2 out of 5 stars. In her review, Ashby praised the racial divides and the good messages about friendship, but criticized the stereotypes surrounding skateboarding culture, the name calling and the main character's disrespect towards adults using slang terms.
