= The West Coast Hustle =

- Genre: Reality
- Starring: Chanel West Coast; Dom Fenison
- Country of origin: United States
- Original language: English
- No. of seasons: 1
- No. of episodes: 8

Production
- Executive producers: Adam Gonzalez; Chanel West Coast; Melissa Tallerine
- Production companies: A Game Productions; MTV Entertainment Studios

Original release
- Network: MTV
- Release: July 18 – August 29, 2024

The West Coast Hustle is an American reality television series featuring American television personality and rapper Chanel West Coast. It premiered on MTV on July 18, 2024. It was cancelled in 2025.

== Production ==
Chanel West Coast first announced a docuseries about her was in development in March 2023, after her departure from Ridiculousness.

== Episodes ==
No.	Title	Original release date	U.S. viewers (millions)
1	"In My Mom Era"	July 18, 2024	N/A
2	"Mom's Back, Baby!"	July 18, 2024	N/A
3	"Work Trip, Don't Trip"	July 25, 2024	N/A
4	"Showing Up For Your Friends"	August 1, 2024	0.081
5	"I Feel Like I'm About to Propose"	August 8, 2024	0.080
6	"Fashion Week Mom"	August 15, 2024	N/A
7	"Hustling For That Invite"	August 22, 2024	0.116
8	"A West Coast Party"	August 29, 2024	0.098
