= FaZe Rug =

American YouTube personality (born 1996)

- FaZe Rug in 2019
- Born: Brian Rafat Awadis; November 19, 1996 (age 30); San Diego, California, U.S.
- Education: Mira Mesa Senior High School; San Diego Miramar College (dropped out)
- Occupations: YouTuber; Internet personality
- Organization: FaZe Clan (2012–2025)

YouTube information
- Channel: Rug
- Years active: 2012–present
- Genres: Gaming; vlogs; pranks; comedy; family-friendly; challenges
- Subscribers: 30.1 million
- Views: 11.2 billion
- Last updated: November 20, 2026

Brian Rafat Awadis (born November 19, 1996), formerly known online as FaZe Rug (or simply Rug), is an American YouTuber who produces vlogs, challenges, gaming videos, and pranks on YouTube. A former co-owner of FaZe Clan and member for 13 years, he acquired his shares when the entertainment brand began distributing them to its biggest members.

Awadis announced that he had left FaZe Clan through a post on X (formerly Twitter) in December 2025. Since then, he has pursued independent content on the YouTube platform.

== Early life ==
Brian Rafat Awadis was born on November 19, 1996 in San Diego, California, to immigrant Chaldo-Assyrian parents from Tel Keppe, Iraq. His father owns two stores. He graduated from Mira Mesa Senior High School and attended San Diego Miramar College before dropping out during his freshman year to pursue his YouTube career full-time. He can speak the Suret language, although not fluently.

== Career ==
Awadis and his older brother Brandon (known online as Brawadis) started a shared YouTube channel called "fathersonchaldean" and posted their first video on the same day, October 11, 2008. They uploaded at least three more videos by the end of 2009. Afterwards, the channel became inactive, but is still on YouTube. These videos depicted a stereotypical view of a Chaldean father's attitude towards his son.

Awadis created his own YouTube channel on July 11, 2012 under the name FaZe Rug on which he started posting short clips of Call of Duty gameplay. He was invited to join the esports team FaZe Clan, which Awadis would eventually co-own, in January 2013. He uploaded his first prank video on December 7, 2014. He spent the next thirteen years as a member of FaZe Clan.

While YouTube remained his primary focus, Awadis expanded into several other entertainment ventures. In November 2019, Awadis released a song called "Goin' Live". A few months later, he was the featured guest in season 17, episode 7 of MTV's Ridiculousness on June 24, 2020.

Awadis co-founded 1UP Candy in 2023, a candy brand that specializes in freeze dried candy.

On December 27, 2025, Awadis announced that he had left FaZe Clan through a post on X. Following his departure, he has continued to pursue independent content on the YouTube platform while retaining the name "FaZe Rug".

== Filmography ==
Film
Year	Title	Role	Ref.
2020	Crimson	Himself	

Television
Year	Title	Role	Ref.	Notes
2020	Ridiculousness	Himself		Season 17; Episode 7
2021	#1 Chicken	Himself (Host)		YouTube original

Web
Year	Title	Role	Ref.	Notes
2021	"Shy Kid Gets Humiliated at School ft. FaZe Rug"	Himself		Dhar Mann Studios

== Awards nominees ==
Year	Ceremony	Category	Result	Ref.
2024	Forbes 30 Under 30	Games	Included	
