= It's Not Christmas Without You =

Single by Victorious cast featuring Victoria Justice

from the album Merry Nickmas
- Released: December 3, 2011
- Genre: Christmas; pop
- Length: 2:33
- Label: Nickelodeon; Columbia
- Songwriters: Dan Schneider; Eric Goldman; Michael Corcoran
- Producers: Eric Goldman; Backhouse Mike

Victorious singles chronology
"Leave It All to Shine" (2011)	"It's Not Christmas Without You" (2011)	"You're the Reason" (2011)

Victoria Justice singles chronology
"Leave It All to Shine" (2011)	"It's Not Christmas Without You" (2011)	"You're the Reason" (2011)

"It's Not Christmas Without You" is a song performed by the cast of the television show Victorious featuring American singer Victoria Justice. The song was released on December 3, 2011, as the lead single for the Nickelodeon holiday compilation album Merry Nickmas (2012). The song was featured in a Victorious holiday special episode. The song peaked at number 23 on the US Holiday Digital Song Sales chart and number five on the US Kid Digital Song Sales chart.

== Release ==
"It's Not Christmas Without You" was released as a single on December 3, 2011, by Nickelodeon Records and Columbia Records. It was also featured in a holiday special titled "A Christmas Tori" for the American television sitcom Victorious on the same day. It features Victoria Justice, Ariana Grande, Elizabeth Gillies, and Leon Thomas III performing the song during the episode. "It's Not Christmas Without You" was later released as the second track for the Nickelodeon holiday compilation album Merry Nickmas on November 19, 2012.

== Composition ==
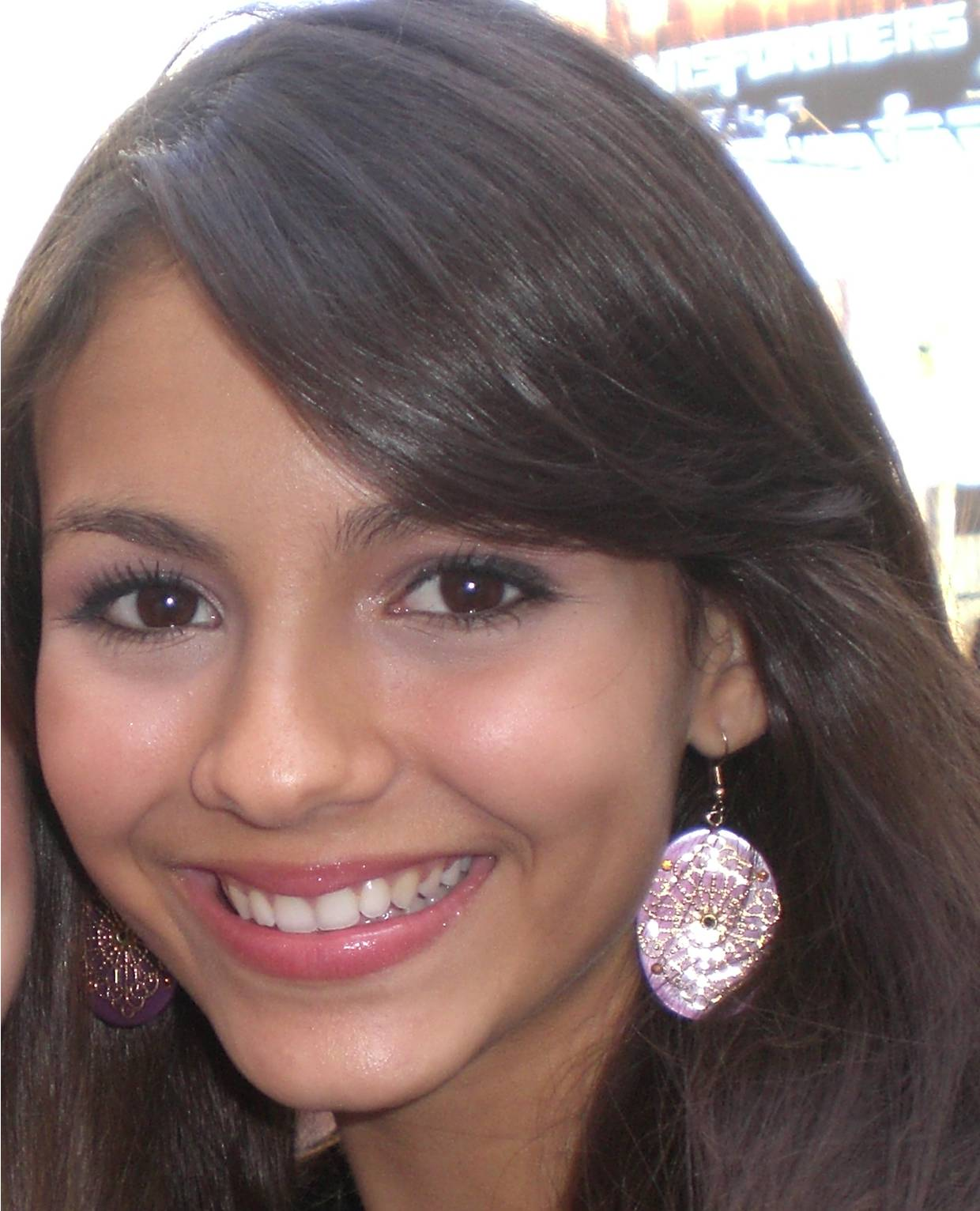
Victoria Justice (pictured in 2007) is featured on the track.

"It's Not Christmas Without You" is 2 minutes and 33 seconds long. It is an upbeat Christmas and pop track that features lead vocals from Justice, Grande, Gillies, and Thomas. The song has background vocals from Niki Watkins, Zack Hexum, who also plays saxophone, Michael Corcoran, and Eric Goldman. Corcoran and Goldman co-wrote and co-produced the song with the show's creator Dan Schneider, and Corcoran handled both engineering and mixing. The track also includes Demian Arriaga on drums and Gabe Johnson on trumpet, while mastering was completed by Stephen Marcussen.

== Reception ==
Writing for Young Hollywood, Casey Clark placed "It's Not Christmas Without You" second on her "5 Throwback Disney & Nick Songs You Need On Your Holiday Playlist" list, stating that people need to "send this song to someone who makes the holidays special". Miranda for WKNC-FM said "It's Not Christmas Without You" is "great to put you into a Christmas mood". Natalee Bravo of Her Campus opined that it ties "the holiday spirit together", describing its lyrics as "fun and catchy". She said the "blend of the cast's voices is seamless while also showcasing their individual strengths".

Jarrod Houseknecht for The Miami Hurricane described the track as a "bop", commenting the song is "so merry" that it is "sure to bring back some of your favorite childhood holiday memories". The staff of The Times of India stated that Justice "added a nostalgic touch" to the song. Jake Mauriello of Study Breaks Magazine called the track an "infectious number", remarking that its "corny lyrics" and "killer brass section" make the song "the perfect blend of all the ingredients that make a great Christmas song". Commercially, "It's Not Christmas Without You" charted at number 23 on the US Billboard Holiday Digital Song Sales chart and number five on the US Billboard Kid Digital Song Sales chart in the United States.

== Credits and personnel ==
Credits adapted from Tidal.

- Victoria Justice – vocals
- Ariana Grande – vocals
- Elizabeth Gillies – vocals
- Leon Thomas III – vocals
- Niki Watkins – background vocals
- Zack Hexum – background vocals, saxophone
- Michael Corcoran – background vocals, writer, producer, mixing engineer, engineer
- Eric Goldman – background vocals, writer, producer
- Dan Schneider – writer
- Stephen Marcussen – mastering engineer
- Demian Arriaga – drums
- Gabe Johnson – trumpet

== Charts ==
Chart (2011–2012)	Peak position
US Holiday Digital Song Sales (Billboard)	23
US Kid Digital Song Sales (Billboard)	5
