= Pure Dope =

Pure DOPE
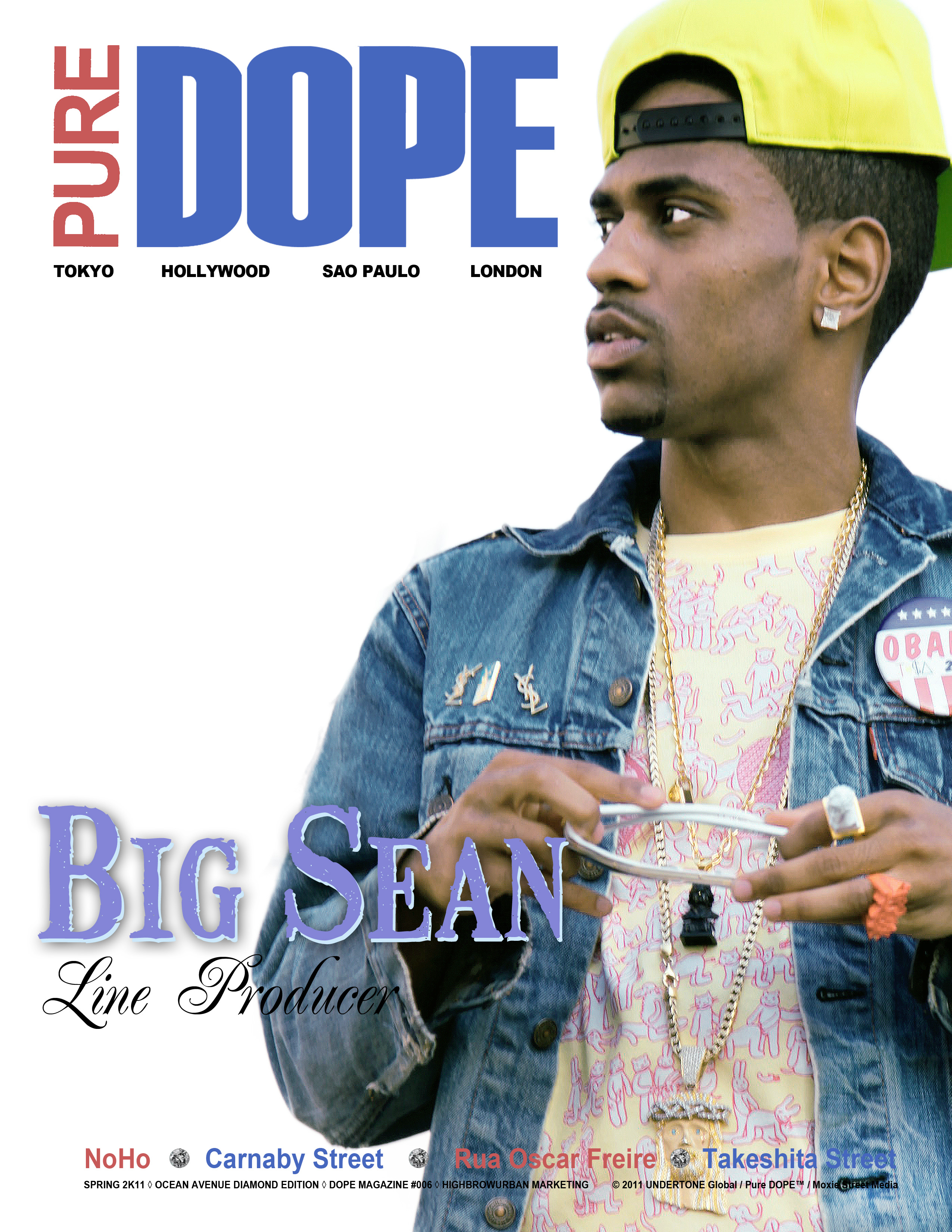
- Big Sean in the Spring 2011 edition
- Categories: Lifestyle, Music
- Publisher: SIX13
- Company: ToneSwep
- Country: United States
- Language: English

Pure Dope is an American magazine and branding agency that focuses on highbrow urban culture and young and affluent tastemakers.

Its coverage includes entertainers, athletes, hip-hop and R&B artists, film and television stars, fine artists, entrepreneurs, street glam brands, and skateboarders. Its name is an acronym for "Don’t Over Process Everything". Each edition has an abstract theme with a cultural meaning. Popular artists and celebrities to cover Pure DOPE include: August Alsina, Tinashe, French Montana, Dascha Polanco, Sage The Gemini, Jazmine Sullivan, Fabolous, Angela Simmons, Soulja Boy, Cymphonique Miller, Big Sean, Trina, Meek Mill, Keke Palmer, The-Dream, Karen Civil, Dae Dae, Melanie Fiona, Chanel West Coast, Nick Cannon, Draya Michele, Travie McCoy, Angela Yee, Yo Gotti, The Game, Lindsey Morgan, Rich Homie Quan, Bianca Santos, Buster Skrine and many others. International singers Agnez Mo (Indonesia) and Maluma (Colombia) have also covered Pure DOPE Magazine. Additionally, the outlet has two companion publications: SEXEE Magazine and MANSION Men's Magazine.
