= Merry Nickmas =

Compilation album by Nickelodeon

Compilation album by various artists
- Released: November 19, 2012
- Recorded: 2008–2012
- Genre: Pop; Christmas; teen pop; pop rock
- Length: 24:23
- Label: Nickelodeon; Columbia
- Producer: Matthew Gerrard

Singles from Merry Nickmas
- 1. "It's Not Christmas Without You" Released: December 3, 2011

Merry Nickmas is a 2012 holiday album that was released on November 19, 2012. The album features musical artists associated or popularized by Nickelodeon like Drake Bell, Miranda Cosgrove, Victoria Justice, Big Time Rush, Jennette McCurdy, Ariana Grande, Elizabeth Gillies, Cymphonique Miller and Rachel Crow singing their own versions of holiday songs. Some songs were recorded prior to the production of this album, while others were recorded specifically for it. It was released in compact disc, digital download, and streaming formats.

== Track listing ==
No.	Title	Writer(s)	Artist(s)	Length
1.	"Sleigh Ride"	Leroy Anderson; Mitchell Parish	Nickelodeon cast	2:48
2.	"It's Not Christmas Without You" (featuring Victoria Justice)	Dan Schneider; Eric Goldman; Michael Corcoran	Victorious cast	2:33
3.	"All I Want for Christmas"	Mariah Carey; Walter Afanasieff	Big Time Rush	3:32
4.	"Rockin' Around the Christmas Tree"	Johnny Marks	Victoria Justice	2:11
5.	"Santa Claus Is Comin' to Town"	Haven Gillespie; J. Fred Coots	Rachel Crow	2:19
6.	"Deck the Halls" (featuring Cymphonique Miller)	Thomas Oliphant	How to Rock cast	2:23
7.	"Jingle Bells"	James Lord Pierpont	Drake Bell	2:31
8.	"Beautiful Christmas"	Nasri Atweh; Nick Turpin	Big Time Rush	3:37
9.	"Don't Be a Jerk (It's Christmas)"	Andy Paley; Tom Kenny	SpongeBob SquarePants	2:29
Total length:				24:23
