= Steelo Brim =

American television personality (born 1988)

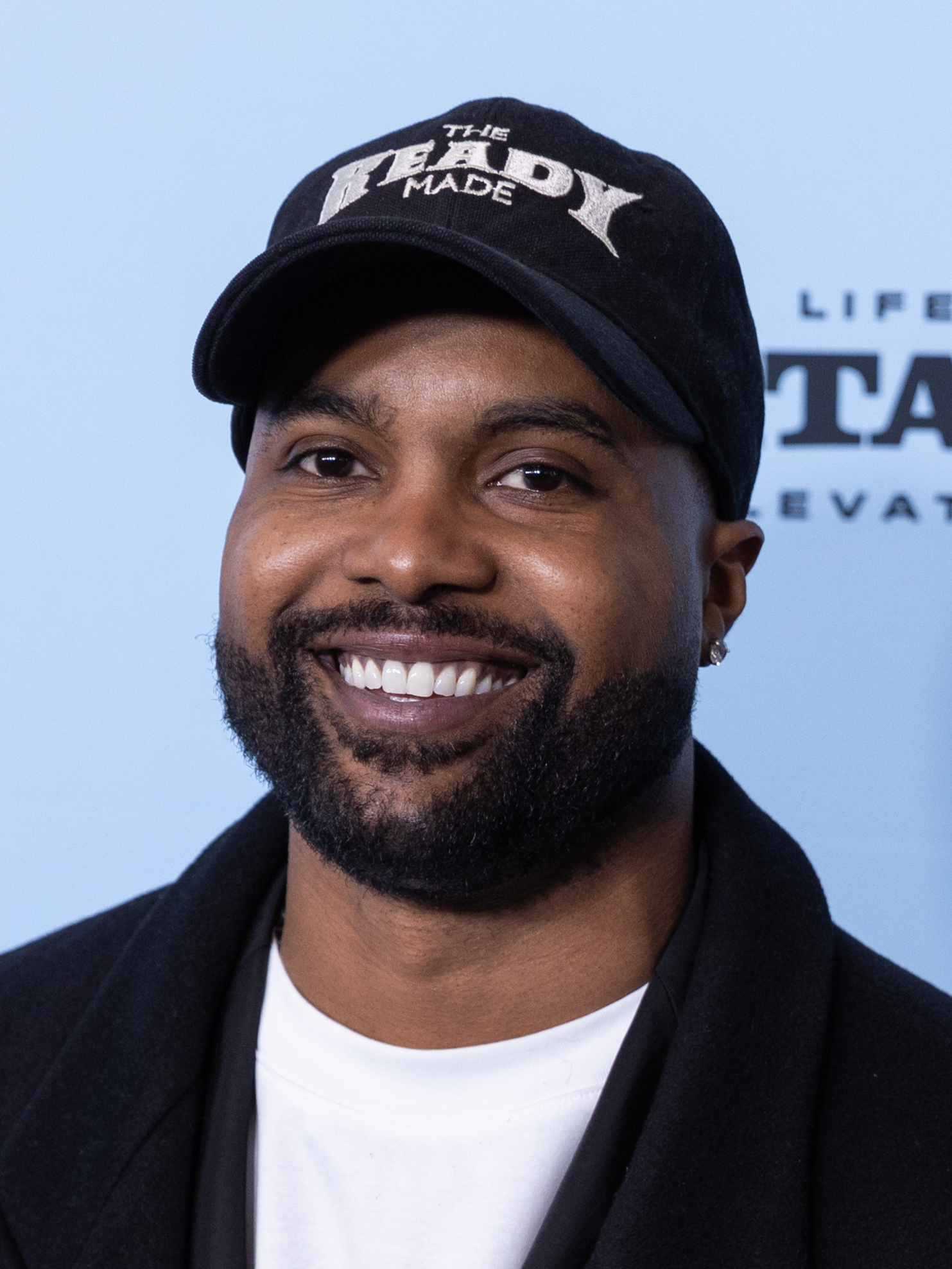
- Brim in 2025
- Born: Sterling Brim; June 5, 1988 (age 38); Chicago, Illinois, U.S.
- Occupations: Television personality; actor; comedian
- Years active: 2001–present
- Television: Rob Dyrdek's Fantasy Factory; Ridiculousness

Sterling "Steelo" Brim (born June 5, 1988) is an American television personality, comedian, and actor. He is a co-host and producer of MTV's Ridiculousness.

== Biography ==
Brim was born and raised in Chicago, Illinois. His mother, Tracy Brim, is a pastor, and his father, Frank Brim, is a Chicago Fire Department Battalion Chief. His father started a baseball team on the west side of Chicago through Garfield Park. Brim also has two brothers and a sister.

In 2001, Brim had a small role in the film Hardball. At the age of 19, Brim moved to Los Angeles to pursue a career in the music industry. He worked in radio and A&R before he met Rob Dyrdek. Dyrdek invited him to be co-host of his new MTV show Ridiculousness, along with Chanel West Coast. Brim holds the position of the creative producer of the show. Brim has also appeared in Rob Dyrdek's Fantasy Factory and Wild Grinders.

Brim is the co-host of the podcast Wine and Weed, with Chris Reinacher. More recently, he had a first look deal at MTV Entertainment Studios.

== Filmography ==
Film & television
Year	Title	Role	Notes
2001	Hardball	Sterling	Feature film
2009–2015	Rob Dyrdek's Fantasy Factory	Himself	Main role; 7 seasons
2011	Orange Drive	Ulysses Williams	Short film
2011–present	Ridiculousness	Co-host	Also Executive Producer (seasons 2–present)
2012–2013	Wild Grinders	Meaty	Voice role, season 1
2014	Teenage Mountain Lion	Most Popular Black Guy	TV series
2015	Scream: Killer Party	Himself	Short film
2019	About The People	The Celebrity	Short film
2023	The Perfect Find	Tim	Film
2025	Ricky	—N/a	Producer
