= Chanel West Coast =

American television personality (born 1988)

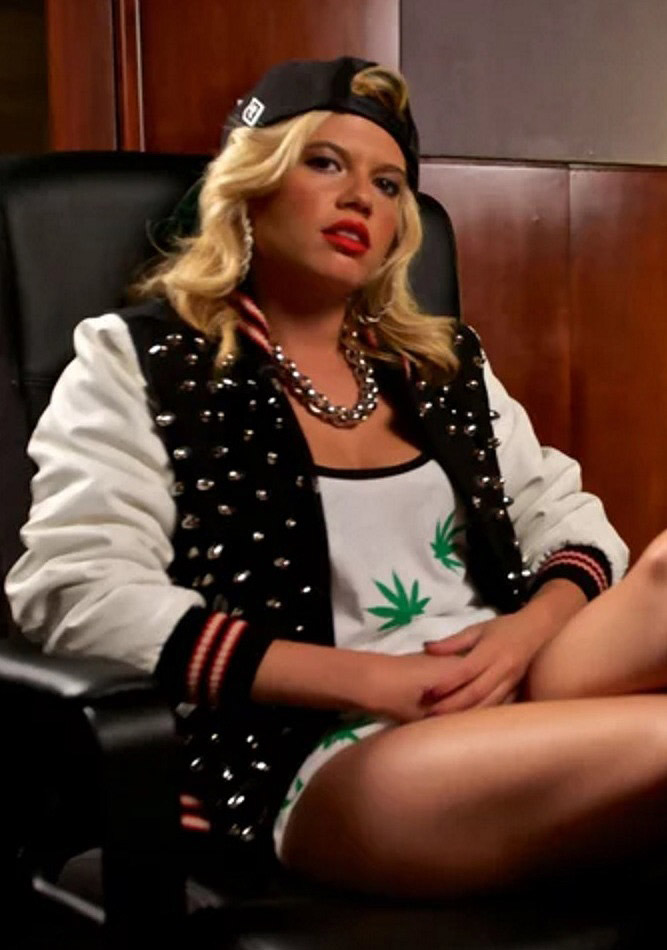
- West Coast posing for Pure Dope in 2013
- Born: Chelsea Chanel Dudley; September 1, 1988 (age 38); Los Angeles, California, U.S.
- Occupations: Television personality; rapper; singer; actress
- Years active: 2009–present
- Television: Rob Dyrdek's Fantasy Factory; Ridiculousness; The West Coast Hustle
- Children: 1
- Musical career
- Genres: Hip hop; R&B; pop; country
- Labels: Young Money; Cash Money; Republic

Chelsea Chanel Dudley (born September 1, 1988), known professionally as Chanel West Coast, is an American television personality, rapper, singer, and actress. She came to prominence in pop culture for her roles in MTV's Rob Dyrdek's Fantasy Factory and Ridiculousness.

== Early life ==
West Coast was born in Los Angeles. While growing up, she lived part of the year in North Hollywood, on the west coast of the United States, with her mother, and split summers between Ohio (with her mother's family) and New York City with her father, a DJ in New York City. Interested in performing arts since she was a kid, she performed in choir, orchestra, wrote poetry, Hip-Hop dance team, drama and cheerleading. She inherited her father's passion for music and began rapping at 14, influenced by her west coast surroundings, love of poetry and not knowing where to begin writing melodies for the lyrics she was writing. In 2009, she recorded her first song at Marvin Gaye's house, in the same booth where the legendary "Let's Get It On" was recorded. West Coast attended Taft High School in Woodland Hills, Los Angeles for two years before homeschooling so she could work and pursue music.

== Television career ==
West Coast was introduced to television personality Rob Dyrdek through mutual friends in 2008. Shortly afterwards, Dyrdek offered West Coast a position as his receptionist while he was appearing on the MTV reality series Rob Dyrdek's Fantasy Factory. The series was renewed for a second season by MTV. The third season of the series premiered in 2011 and the fourth season began airing later that year. In 2011, West Coast appeared as Sheila in an episode of the MTV series The Hard Times of RJ Berger, making her acting debut.

In 2011, she joined the series Ridiculousness, in which she, along with Dyrdek and Steelo Brim, review online internet videos. In 2012, West Coast appeared in both the fifth season of Fantasy Factory and the second season of Ridiculousness. That same year she began to voice the character of Flipz in the animated series Wild Grinders. West Coast continued to voice the character into 2013, when she also appeared on the third season of Ridiculousness.

In March 2023, West Coast announced her departure from Ridiculousness. A reality television show about her, titled The West Coast Hustle, premiered in 2024.

== Music career ==
West Coast began recording music in 2009, and began collaborating with numerous artists. She recorded her first song at Marvin Gaye's house, in the same booth where "Let's Get It On" was recorded. She later appeared in the Planet Hollywood song "Phamous", collaborating with Midi Mafia on the project and was discovered by Polow Da Don, who introduced her to Lil Wayne. Lil Wayne signed West Coast to his label Young Money Entertainment in 2012. She went on to release her mixtape Now You Know in 2013 featuring Snoop Dogg, French Montana, Ty Dolla $ign, Robin Thicke and Honey Cocaine. She also released a music video for "Been On", featuring French Montana.

In 2014, she won a BET Award for Best Group for her affiliation with Young Money and confirmed that she had begun recording her first studio project, the first single, "Blueberry Chills" featuring Honey Cocaine was released on January 15, 2014. The second single off the album, "New Feeling" was released on January 29. The third single off the album, "Miles and Miles" was released on October 29, which features West Coast providing vocals for the first time. In 2015, West Coast released a new song that was featured on Rob Dyrdek's Fantasy Factory called "Bass In The Trunk". She released her second mixtape WAVES, featuring YG and B-Real, in August 2015.

In 2018, West Coast released a song titled "Nobody." On October 23, 2020, West Coast released her debut studio album America's Sweetheart and completed two headlining tours; the Punch Drunk Love Tour and the Now You Know Tour as well as opened for many big names including Lil Wayne, Cardi B and more.

In May 2026, she released "Down to the Filter", her first country song.

== Other ventures ==
In 2009, West Coast helped create a clothing line called Valleywood. As of 2019, she also released another clothing line named LOL Cartel. In 2022, Chanel launched a line of eco-friendly body positivity swimwear called Coasty Swim.

== Personal life ==
On June 2, 2022, West Coast announced that she was expecting her first child with her long-term boyfriend, and The West Coast Hustle co-star, Dom Fenison. She gave birth to their daughter on November 2, 2022. The couple engaged in December 2025.

== Filmography ==
Television
Year	Title	Role	Notes
2009–2015	Rob Dyrdek's Fantasy Factory	Herself	Main role; 7 seasons
2011	The Hard Times of RJ Berger	Sheila	Episode: "The Better Man"
2011–2023	Ridiculousness	Co-host	credited as Featuring; 30 seasons
2012–2015	Wild Grinders	Flipz	Voice role
2017	Love & Hip Hop: Hollywood	Herself	Supporting role (season 4)
2018	Fear Factor	Herself	Episode: "Hip-Hop Battle"
2023	The Eric Andre Show	Herself	Episode: "Woodchipper Hijinks"
2024	The West Coast Hustle	Herself	Main

== Discography ==
=== Studio albums ===
Title	Album details
America's Sweetheart	Released: October 22, 2020; Label: Riveting Entertainment; Format: Digital download, streaming

=== Mixtapes ===
List of mixtapes, with year released
Title	Album details
Now You Know	Released: July 9, 2013; Label: Young Money Entertainment, BornRich; Format: Digital download, streaming
Waves	Released: August 25, 2015; Label: Young Money Entertainment, BornRich; Format: Digital download, streaming

=== Singles ===
==== As lead artist ====
- 2016: "Bad Things"
- 2016: "Bass In The Trunk"
- 2016: "Been On" (feat. French Montana)
- 2016: "Blueberry Chills" (feat. Honey C)
- 2016: "C'est la vie"
- 2016: "Creepin"
- 2016: "Holiday"
- 2016: "I Love Money"
- 2016: "Miles And Miles"
- 2016: "Own World"
- 2016: "Quicksand"
- 2016: "Notice"
- 2016: "Countin"
- 2017: "New Bae" (feat. Safaree)
- 2017: "Everywhere We Go"
- 2018: "Nobody"
- 2018: "Have It"
- 2019: "The Middle"
- 2019: "Sharon Stoned"
- 2019: "Old Fashioned" (feat. Nessly)
- 2019: "I Be Like" (feat. Dax)
- 2019: "Anchors"
- 2020: "Black Roses"
- 2020: "No Plans"
- 2020: "West Coast Christmas"
- 2020: "40 Yard Dash"
- 2024: “Little Miss Sunshine”
- 2025: "Lil' Bit Country"

==== As featured artist ====
- 2015: "If You Didn't" (with Rich Homie Quan, T.I.)
- 2016: "Project X" (with Frenchie)
- 2017: "Ain't My Fault" (with JildyT)
- 2018: "Flex on a Bih" (with Bpace)
- 2019: "Butter" (with Grizz Lee)
- 2020: "Secure the Bag" (with Anaya Lovenote, Ying Yang Twins)
- 2020: "Twerk Train" [with Too $hort / including a remix version]
- 2021: "Yea Yea Yea" (with Minus Gravity)
