= 2017 deaths in American television =

The following deaths of notable individuals related to American television occurred in 2017.

== January ==
| Date | Name | Age | Notability | Source |
|---|---|---|---|---|
| January 2 | Richard Machowicz | 51 | Former Navy SEAL and host of Discovery Channel's Future Weapons | |
| January 5 | Sam Lovullo | 88 | Producer (co-creator of Hee Haw) | |
| January 6 | Francine York | 80 | American actress, model, and fitness activist, notable for playing Lydia Limpet on Batman, Venus DeMilo in Bewitched, a regular role as Lorraine Farr Temple on Days of Our Lives, and guest roles in Shirley Temple's Storybook, The Mindy Project and Hot in Cleveland; recurring roles on All My Children, One Life to Live, and Santa Barbara | |
| January 10 | Tony Rosato | 62 | Canadian actor, most noteworthy for being a cast member on SCTV and Saturday Night Live | |
| January 12 | William Peter Blatty | 89 | American Oscar-winning screenwriter and author/novelist whose best-selling thriller novel The Exorcist became the basis for the franchise that included the film and TV series. | |
| January 13 | Dick Gautier | 85 | American-born Canadian actor, singer, voice actor, comedian, game show panelist, author and artist, notable for playing Hymie the robot on Get Smart, Robin Hood in When Things Were Rotten, and the voice of Rodimus Prime in the Transformers television series universe | |
| January 15 | James Reiher | 73 | Fijian professional WWE Hall of Fame wrestler, better known as Jimmy "Superfly" Snuka | |
| January 19 | Loalwa Braz | 63 | Brazilian singer/songwriter and former member of Kaoma (appeared on The Arsenio Hall Show and Sabado Gigante) | |
| January 19 | Miguel Ferrer | 61 | American actor (Dr. Garret Macy on Crossing Jordan, Owen Granger on NCIS: Los Angeles, and Albert Rosenfield on Twin Peaks; other starring roles include Shannon's Deal, Broken Badges, On the Air, Cruel Doubt, The Stand, LateLine, Bionic Woman and The Protector). | |
| January 19 | Jim Fagan | 72 | American voiceover artist best known for the announcer of NBA on NBC and WWE. | |
| January 21 | Maggie Roche | 65 | American singer/songwriter and member of the family trio The Roches (TV credits include Tiny Toon Adventures, Saturday Night Live, and Tracey Takes On) | |
| January 22 | Connor Vernon | 63 | Meteorologist who worked at Alabama stations WTVY-TV and WDHN in Dothan (the latter from 2014 until his death), and WSFA in Montgomery | |
| January 25 | Mary Tyler Moore | 80 | American Emmy Award-winning actress, singer, activist, and businesswoman, best known as Laura Petrie on The Dick Van Dyke Show and Mary Richards on her self-titled series, as well as co-founder of MTM Enterprises, among numerous other series and telefilm credits | |
| January 26 | Mike Connors | 91 | American actor, notable for playing Joe Mannix in the 1967-75 series Mannix, as well as lead roles in Tightrope! and Today's FBI | |
| January 26 | Barbara Hale | 94 | American actress, notable for playing Della Street in the Perry Mason TV series and subsequent film versions. | |
| January 27 | Stan Boreson | 91 | Comedian and TV personality, best known as the host of King's Klubhouse on KING-TV/Seattle for 12 years | |
| January 31 | Frank Pellegrino | 72 | Actor and restaurateur, best known as Frank Cubitoso on The Sopranos | |

== February ==
| Date | Name | Age | Notability | Source |
|---|---|---|---|---|
| February 6 | Irwin Corey | 102 | American improviser, comedian, actor and humorist (TV credits include The Phil Silvers Show and The Donald O'Connor Show, numerous game shows, and promos for WJAR-TV/Providence and WTMJ-TV/Milwaukee) | |
| February 7 | Richard Hatch | 71 | Actor, best known as Captain Apollo in the original 1978 Battlestar Galactica and Tom Zarek in its 2004 remake | |
| February 11 | Chavo Guerrero Sr. | 68 | Professional wrestler who worked in the Universal Wrestling Federation, the American Wrestling Association, and the WWE from 1970 to 2010; oldest WWE Cruiserweight Champion; father of Chavo Guerrero Jr. | |
| February 11 | Howard Leeds | 97 | Canadian-born American television producer, writer, and creator (notable for creating and producing My Living Doll, Diff'rent Strokes, The Facts of Life, Small Wonder, The Brady Bunch, Silver Spoons, The Ghost & Mrs. Muir, and Hello Larry; writer for Bewitched, Bachelor Father, My Three Sons, Meet Millie, Make Room for Daddy, and Barney Miller; co-writer on specials featuring Bob Hope, Lucille Ball, Benny Hill, among others) | |
| February 12 | Jay Bontatibus | 52 | American actor (The Young and the Restless, General Hospital and Days of Our Lives) | |
| February 12 | Al Jarreau | 76 | American Grammy Award-winning singer/songwriter, notable for recording the theme song from Moonlighting and appearing as himself on The Soul Man | |
| February 13 | Bruce Lansbury | 87 | British-born American television/film producer, founder of Bruce Lansbury Productions, and "Vice President of Creative Affairs" (as shown on closing credits) for Paramount Television (Notable work includes The Wild Wild West, Mission: Impossible, Wonder Woman, Knight Rider, The Fantastic Journey, The Brady Bunch, Happy Days, The Odd Couple, and producer/co-writer on Murder, She Wrote, starring his sister, Angela) | |
| February 16 | Jim Myers | 79 | WWE Hall of Fame professional wrestler better known as George "The Animal" Steele | |
| February 17 | Warren Frost | 91 | Actor, best known as Will "Doc" Hayward on Twin Peaks. Also recurring roles on Seinfeld and Matlock and guest spots on Another World, Loving, and As the World Turns. | |
| February 17 | Nicole Bass | 52 | Professional wrestler who worked with the WWE and Extreme Championship Wrestling in the 1990s and a member of Howard Stern's Wack Pack; guest roles on The Bold and the Beautiful, Days of Our Lives, General Hospital and Guiding Light | |
| February 18 | Oreal Perras | 74 | Former WWWF and NWA professional wrestler, better known as "The Russian Bear" Ivan Koloff | |
| February 20 | Brenda Buttner | 55 | American business/financial news reporter (correspondent on Bulls & Bears, host of The Money Club, and contributor on Your World with Neil Cavuto) and reporter for KRNV-DT/Reno | |
| February 23 | Ward Chamberlin | 95 | Executive with WETA-TV/Washington, D.C. and WNET/New York City and original chairman of Corporation for Public Broadcasting | |
| February 23 | Alan Colmes | 66 | American political commentator and TV/radio personality (co-host of Hannity & Colmes, frequent guest on The O'Reilly Factor, Red Eye, The Greg Gutfeld Show, and Fox News Watch) | |
| February 25 | Neil Fingleton | 36 | English-American actor and basketball player, notable for playing Mag the Mighty in Game of Thrones | |
| February 25 | Bill Paxton | 61 | American film/television actor and filmmaker, notable for portraying characters roles such as Frank Roake on Training Day, John Garrett in Agents of S.H.I.E.L.D., Bill Henrickson in Big Love, Billy Joe Robb in Fresno and Randolph McCoy in Hatfields & McCoys; guest roles on Miami Vice, The Hitchhiker, Tales from the Crypt, Frasier, narrator on JFK: The Day That Changed Everything, and appearances in music videos for Barnes and Barnes ("Fish Heads", which he also directed), Pat Benatar ("Shadows of the Night") and Limp Bizkit ("Eat You Alive") | |
| February 25 | Chez Pazienza | 47 | American TV producer at cable news channels MSNBC and CNN; Los Angeles stations KCBS, KNBC and KCAL; and Miami stations WTVJ and WPLG | |
| February 25 | Ron Savage | 63 | Anchor/reporter at WJBK/Detroit and volunteer firefighter/EMT for the Milford Fire Department | |
| February 26 | Joseph Wapner | 97 | Former Judge in the Los Angeles County Superior Court, who became better known as the Judge on The People's Court from 1981 to 1993 and Judge Wapner's Animal Court; appeared as an alternative version of himself (as a "Soviet Judge") in Sliders, and an episode of The Tonight Show Starring Johnny Carson to resolve a dispute between the host and David Letterman | |
| February 27 | John Harlan | 91 | Announcer (Password, Name That Tune) | |
| February 28 | Paul Kangas | 79 | Anchor of Nightly Business Report 1979–2009 | |

== March ==
| Date | Name | Age | Notability | Source |
|---|---|---|---|---|
| March 3 | Míriam Colón | 80 | Puerto Rican actress (Studio One in Hollywood, Shirley Temple's Storybook, Dr. Kildare, The Great Adventure, Gunsmoke, The Edge of Night, Streets of Laredo, One Life to Live, Guiding Light, All My Children, Third Watch, Jonny Zero, Hawthorne, How to Make It in America and Better Call Saul) | |
| March 3 | Tommy Page | 46 | American singer/actor, VJ, record executive, and journalist/editor at Billboard (appeared on Full House and hosting duties for programs on MTV and MTV Asia) | |
| March 3 | Ron Heard | 68 | Former NWA and WWF professional wrestler, better known as "Outlaw" Ron Bass | |
| March 6 | Robert Osborne | 84 | Host on Turner Classic Movies since the network's launch in 1994, The Movie Channel 1986–1993 and entertainment critic on KTTV 1982–1987. Also author/film historian (columnist at The Hollywood Reporter) and actor (appeared in The Beverly Hillbillies and The Californians). | |
| March 7 | Doug Paul | 59 | Voice-over announcer for promos on Tribune Broadcasting's stations, including WGN-TV, WPIX and KTLA in the 1980s and 1990s and Peachtree TV and Grit in the present day, along with commercial clients like JoS. A. Bank and Coca-Cola. | |
| March 8 | Lou Duva | 94 | American boxing promoter, manager and trainer; member of the Boxing Hall of Fame (ABC's Wide World of Sports, Showtime Championship Boxing, ESPN Top Rank Boxing, HBO Boxing, Friday Night Fights, ESPN SportsCentury) | |
| March 10 | Joni Sledge | 60 | American singer/songwriter/producer and a member of family musical group Sister Sledge (TV credits include The Jeffersons, American Bandstand, Fridays, Soul Train, and The Midnight Special) | |
| March 13 | John Andariese | 78 | Sports journalist, reporter and analyst, nicknamed "Johnny Hoops" for his play-by-play of the New York Knicks broadcasts on TV and radio; also served as commentator on TBS, NBC, ESPN and NBA TV, the latter as TV host | |
| March 13 | Mike Aktari | 28 | Reality TV star (Jerseylicious) | |
| March 17 | Lawrence Montaigne | 86 | Actor (guest spots on Star Trek, Batman, Voyage to the Bottom of the Sea, The Man From U.N.C.L.E., Blue Light, Mission: Impossible, The Time Tunnel, The Invaders, Perry Mason, McCloud, and The Feather and Father Gang). | |
| March 18 | Chuck Berry | 90 | American Rock and Roll Hall of Fame singer, songwriter and guitarist whose music can be heard in numerous TV shows | |
| March 21 | Chuck Barris | 87 | Game show producer (Creator of The Newlywed Game, The Dating Game, The Family Game, and The Parent Game). Also host/creator of The Gong Show and founder of Chuck Barris Productions | |
| March 22 | Vince Jones | 46 | Bounty hunter and star of Big Rig Bounty Hunters | |
| March 22 | Tomas Milian | 84 | Cuban-born American-Italian actor (Miami Vice, The Equalizer, Drug Wars: The Camarena Story, L.A. Law, Frannie's Turn, Murder, She Wrote, Oz, Law & Order, and UC: Undercover) | |
| March 23 | Lola Albright | 92 | Actress (guest appearances on Lux Video Theatre, Alfred Hitchcock Presents, The Thin Man, Gunsmoke, Rawhide, The Dick Van Dyke Show, My Three Sons, The Beverly Hillbillies, Bonanza, The Man from U.N.C.L.E., Medical Center, Kojak, Columbo, McMillan & Wife, Quincy, M.E., Starsky & Hutch, The Incredible Hulk, Peter Gunn, Mr. Broadway, and Peyton Place) | |
| March 24 | Rich Fisher | 67 | News anchor at Detroit stations WJBK, WWJ-TV, and WXYZ-TV | |
| March 24 | Jean Rouverol | 100 | Screenwriter (co-head writer on Guiding Light in the early 1970s, wrote episodes of Little House on the Prairie, Search for Tomorrow and As the World Turns). Also served on the board of directors of the Writers Guild of America, West. | |
| March 26 | Clay Adler | 27 | Actor and reality star (Newport Harbor: The Real Orange County, Make It or Break It) | |
| March 27 | Noreen Fraser | 63 | Producer (Entertainment Tonight, The Home Show, The Richard Simmons Show). Also co-founder of Stand Up to Cancer. | |
| March 27 | Chelsea Brown | 69 | American comedic actress/singer/dancer, who was a regular on Rowan & Martin's Laugh-In and later a successful television actress and personality in Australia (TV credits include Love, American Style, Marcus Welby, M.D., Ironside, Matt Lincoln, and Mission: Impossible) | |
| March 28 | Kelley Williamson | 57 | Storm chasers who worked for The Weather Channel | |
| March 28 | Randy Yarnall | 55 | Storm chasers who worked for The Weather Channel | |
| March 31 | Scott Brown | 59 | Political/investigative journalist for WGRZ/Buffalo, New York | |

== April ==
| Date | Name | Age | Notability | Source |
|---|---|---|---|---|
| April 6 | Don Rickles | 90 | Comedian and actor who made numerous appearances on The Tonight Show Starring Johnny Carson, Late Show with David Letterman, and The Dean Martin Celebrity Roast. Won a Primetime Emmy Award for his autobiographical documentary, Mr. Warmth: The Don Rickles Project. Also lead roles in the sitcom C.P.O. Sharkey, two series named The Don Rickles Show, and the short-lived sitcom Daddy Dearest. | |
| April 6 | Tom Johnston | 46 | Meteorologist at WCSH/Portland, Maine. Found dead April 6; likely died several days prior. | |
| April 7 | Frank Bramhall | 83 | Radio and Television personality in the Omaha market, notably as a meteorologist at WOWT | |
| April 9 | Peter Hansen | 95 | Actor, best known as Lee Baldwin on General Hospital and its spinoff Port Charles. Also guest spots on The Public Defender, Ben Jerrod, The Goldbergs, Cheers, The Golden Girls, Broken Arrow, Richard Diamond, Private Detective, Maverick, Petticoat Junction, Gomer Pyle, U.S.M.C., How The West Was Won, Magnum, P.I., L.A. Law, Night Court, and Growing Pains. | |
| April 11 | Dorothy Mengering | 95 | Mother of David Letterman, made numerous appearances on his programs Late Night and Late Show | |
| April 12 | Charlie Murphy | 57 | Actor and comedian (writer and cast member on Chappelle's Show, recurring roles on Are We There Yet? and The Boondocks). Brother of actor/comedian Eddie Murphy. | |
| April 15 | Clifton James | 96 | Actor (recurring roles on Captains and the Kings, Lewis & Clark, and All My Children; guest spots on The Dukes of Hazzard, City of Angels, The A-Team, and Gunsmoke). | |
| April 17 | Trish Vradenburg | 70 | Screenwriter (Designing Women, Kate & Allie, Family Ties, and Everything's Relative) | |
| April 19 | Aaron Hernandez | 27 | NFL tight end for the New England Patriots (2010-2013) | |
| April 20 | Doug Smith | 81 | On-air personality at WIVB-TV in Buffalo, New York | |
| April 21 | Sandy Gallin | 76 | American film, stage, and television producer, manager, and promoter (co-creator and co-producer of Live... and In Person, Babes, and Buffy the Vampire Slayer) | |
| April 22 | Erin Moran | 56 | American actress best known for her role of Joanie Cunningham in Happy Days and its spinoff Joanie Loves Chachi | |
| April 23 | Chris Bearde | 80 | British writer and producer (Rowan & Martin's Laugh-In, The Ray Stevens Show, The Andy Williams Show, The Ken Berry 'Wow' Show, The Sonny & Cher Comedy Hour, The Sonny Comedy Revue, The Hudson Brothers Razzle Dazzle Show, That's My Mama, Cos, The Gong Show, The Bobby Vinton Show, Sherman Oaks and The Gong Show with Dave Attell) | |
| April 23 | Kathleen Crowley | 87 | American actress (Chevron Theatre, Waterfront, Fireside Theatre, Schlitz Playhouse, Climax!, Matinee Theatre, Bat Masterson, 77 Sunset Strip, Surfside 6, Hawaiian Eye, Bronco, Maverick, Tales of Wells Fargo, Perry Mason, Batman, Bonanza and Family Affair) | |
| April 26 | Jonathan Demme | 73 | American Oscar-winning film, television, and music video director and producer (TV credits include Columbo, Saturday Night Live, American Playhouse, Subway Stories, Enlightened, A Gifted Man, The Killing, The New Yorker Presents and Shots Fired) | |

== May ==
| Date | Name | Age | Notability | Source |
|---|---|---|---|---|
| May 4 | Ed Sherin | 87 | Director/producer, most notably on Law & Order | |
| May 5 | Quinn O'Hara | 76 | Scottish-born American actress, singer, and model (TV credits include Burke's Law, I'm Dickens, He's Fenster, The Real McCoys, My Three Sons, The Red Skelton Hour, The Beverly Hillbillies, The Man from U.N.C.L.E., Ironside, One Day at a Time and CHiPs) | |
| May 5 | Robert Wilson | 75 | Co-Founder and General Manager of KERA-TV & FM Dallas-Ft. Worth, credited for introducing Monty Python's Flying Circus to American viewers; father of Luke and Owen Wilson | |
| May 8 | Curt Lowens | 91 | German-American actor and Holocaust survivor (Combat!, Twelve O'Clock High, Hogan's Heroes, Garrison's Gorillas Run for Your Life, Mission: Impossible, The F.B.I., It Takes a Thief, Medical Center, M*A*S*H, Cannon, The Streets of San Francisco, The Six Million Dollar Man, Wonder Woman, The French Atlantic Affair, Barnaby Jones, Galactica 1980, Romance Theatre, V, Dynasty, Knight Rider, The A-Team, and Babylon 5) | |
| May 8 | Douglas Netter | 96 | American producer (The Sacketts, Buffalo Soldiers, Wild Times, Roughnecks, Walt Disney's Wonderful World of Color, Captain Power and the Soldiers of the Future, Babylon 5, The Wild West, Siringo, Hypernauts, Crusade and Dan Dare: Pilot of the Future) | |
| May 9 | Christopher "Big Black" Boykin | 45 | Actor and reality television personality (Rob & Big, Rob Dyrdek's Fantasy Factory) | |
| May 9 | Michael Parks | 77 | American singer and actor (Zane Grey Theater, The Detectives, The Dick Powell Show, Gunsmoke, The Alfred Hitchcock Hour, Wagon Train, Channing, Route 66, Then Came Bronson, Police Woman, Fantasy Island, The Riverman, The Colbys, The Equalizer, Twin Peaks, Shades of LA, and Walker, Texas Ranger) | |
| May 13 | John Cygan | 63 | Actor (several roles, most notably Lt. Paulie Pentangeli on The Commish) | |
| May 14 | Powers Boothe | 68 | Emmy-winning actor (Philip Marlowe on Philip Marlowe, Private Eye, Cy Tolliver on Deadwood, Noah Daniels on 24, Lamar Wyatt on Nashville, Gideon Malick on Agents of S.H.I.E.L.D., and the voice of Gorilla Grodd in Justice League and Justice League Unlimited). | |
| May 18 | Roger Ailes | 77 | CEO of Fox News Channel and Fox Television Stations, creator of America's Talking and former host of Straight Forward. | |
| May 19 | Wayne Walker | 80 | Retired football player (Detroit Lions) and later sportscaster/sports director at KPIX-TV/San Francisco, 1974–1994. Also color commentator for NFL on CBS in the 1980s, and host of Incredible Idaho on KTVB-TV/Boise in the 1990s. | |
| May 22 | Dina Merrill | 93 | American actress, socialite, businesswoman and philanthropist (credits include a regular role in Hot Pursuit, Calamity Jan in Batman alongside then-husband Cliff Robertson, Bonanza, The Love Boat, and The Nanny; television films include Seven in Darkness, The Lonely Profession, Family Flight, and The Tenth Month) | |
| May 23 | Roger Moore | 89 | British actor best known as James Bond in seven films. (TV credits include Ivanhoe, The Alaskans, Maverick, The Saint, and The Persuaders!) | |
| May 24 | Jared Martin | 75 | American actor (starring roles in The Fantastic Journey, One Life to Live, and War of the Worlds and a notable recurring role in Dallas, as Steven "Dusty" Farlow, and guest roles in The Young Lawyers, The Bold Ones: The Lawyers, Night Gallery, The Rookies, The Six Million Dollar Man, The Waltons, How the West Was Won, Wonder Woman, The Love Boat, Murder, She Wrote, Hotel, and Knight Rider) | |
| May 27 | Jay Kordich | 93 | Creator of and spokesman for the Juiceman Juicer, a product seen ubiquitously on U.S. infomercials in the 1990s | |
| May 28 | Frank Deford | 78 | American sportswriter and commentator, correspondent for HBO's Real Sports with Bryant Gumbel, winner of Emmy, Peabody and CableACE awards | |
| May 30 | Wendell Burton | 69 | American actor (Murder Once Removed, Young Dr. Kildare, Medical Center, Longstreet, Room 222, Love, American Style, Go Ask Alice, You're a Good Man, Charlie Brown, Kung Fu, The New Dick Van Dyke Show, The Rookies, Insight, The Red Badge of Courage, Journey from Darkness, Medical Story, East of Eden, Mathnet and Square One Television) | |
| May 30 | Robert Michael Morris | 77 | Playwright and actor, best known as Mickey Deane in The Comeback and Mr Lunt in Running Wilde. Also guest spots on Will & Grace, How I Met Your Mother, 2 Broke Girls, and several other shows. | |
| May 30 | Elena Verdugo | 92 | Actress (most notably on Meet Millie and Marcus Welby M.D.) | |
| May 31 | Tino Insana | 69 | Voice actor, best known as Uncle Ted on Bobby's World. Also actor (appeared on episodes of Designing Women, Night Court, Mad About You, Dream On, and Curb Your Enthusiasm) | |

== June ==
| Date | Name | Age | Notability | Source |
|---|---|---|---|---|
| June 3 | Danny Dias | 34 | Reality star (appeared in season 13 of Road Rules) | |
| June 4 | Roger Smith | 84 | Actor best known as Jeff Spencer on 77 Sunset Strip | |
| June 5 | Marilyn Hall | 90 | Writer (Love, American Style and Lights, Camera, Monty) and producer (A Woman Called Golda, Do You Remember Love, and The Ginger Tree). Wife of game show host on Let's Make A Deal Monty Hall. | |
| June 8 | Glenne Headly | 62 | Actress (recurring roles in Lonesome Dove, ER, Encore! Encore!, Monk, and The Night Of) | |
| June 9 | Adam West | 88 | American television, film, and voice actor, best known for playing and voicing the role of Bruce Wayne/Batman in the 1966-68 original TV series and in its related DC television universe franchises featuring the character, as well as the voice of Mayor West in Family Guy, a regular role in The Detectives, pitchman for Nestle Quik, among other numerous performances; alumni of KGMB-TV/Honolulu | |
| June 15 | Bill Dana | 92 | Actor, best known as José Jiménez on his eponymous show. Also made numerous appearances on The Ed Sullivan Show and was flagship personality of the short-lived United Network, hosting its only program The Las Vegas Show | |
| June 16 | Stephen Furst | 62 | American actor (Babylon 5, Buzz Lightyear of Star Command, St. Elsewhere) | |
| June 23 | Gabe Pressman | 93 | News anchor in New York City for over 50 years, mostly at WNBC, but also at WNEW | |
| June 26 | Warren Doremus | 91 | News anchor at WHEC/Rochester, New York for 45 years. Won the Alfred I. duPont–Columbia University Award in 1976. | |
| June 27 | Michael Bond | 91 | British author who created the characters in the show Paddington Bear | |

== July ==
| Date | Name | Age | Notability | Source |
|---|---|---|---|---|
| July 1 | Stevie Ryan | 33 | Reality show personality, star of Stevie TV | |
| July 6 | Joan Lee | 95 | Model, author, and voice actress (Iron Man, Fantastic Four and Spider-Man). Wife of legendary Marvel Comics writer/editor Stan Lee. | |
| July 6 | Nancy Jeffett | 88 | Tennis promoter who arranged the first network television broadcast of women's tennis in 1972. | |
| July 8 | Nelsan Ellis | 39 | Actor, best known for playing Lafayette Reynolds in True Blood | |
| July 9 | Wally Burr | 91 | Voice actor (Crying Freeman, G.I. Joe: A Real American Hero, Jem, Spider-Man, The All-New Super Friends Hour, The Skatebirds, The Transformers) | |
| July 9 | Jack Shaheen | 81 | Consultant on Middle East affairs for CBS News | |
| July 13 | John Bernecker | 33 | Stuntman on The Walking Dead and numerous films | |
| July 15 | Martin Landau | 89 | Oscar-winning actor (TV work includes starring roles on Mission: Impossible, The Evidence and Space: 1999; and recurring spots on Without a Trace, Entourage and Spider-Man; and several television films) | |
| July 15 | Bob Wolff | 96 | Sportscaster (announcer for the Washington Senators, and reporter on NBC Sports, News 12 Long Island, MSG Network, and YES Network) | |
| July 16 | George A. Romero | 77 | Horror film/TV director, writer, producer and actor (creator/executive producer of Tales from the Darkside) | |
| July 18 | Harvey Atkin | 74 | Actor, best known as Sergeant Ronald Coleman on Cagney & Lacey | |
| July 18 | Red West | 81 | Actor, best known as Sgt. Andy Micklin on Black Sheep Squadron | |
| July 21 | John Heard | 71 | Actor (TV roles including recurring spots on The Client, The Sopranos, CSI: Miami, and Prison Break) | |
| July 22 | Jim Vance | 75 | News anchor on WRC-TV/Washington, DC for 45 years | |
| July 25 | Barbara Sinatra | 90 | Model, dancer, writer, and widow of Frank Sinatra. Appeared as herself in several documentaries. | |
| July 26 | Patti Deutsch | 73 | American comedic television, film and voice actress (notable for being a regular on Rowan & Martin's Laugh-In, This Is Tom Jones, Grandpa Goes to Washington, Tattletales, and Match Game; voice work for The Smurfs, Capitol Critters, As Told by Ginger, The Electric Company, The Emperor's New School, and The Wild Thornberrys) | |
| July 26 | June Foray | 99 | Actress and voiceover artist (most notably the voices for Rocky J. Squirrel and Natasha Fatale on The Rocky and Bullwinkle Show and Granny from the Looney Tunes Series) | |
| July 27 | Sam Shepard | 73 | Pulitzer Prize-winning playwright, screenwriter, director and actor (TV roles include recurring spots on Bloodline, Streets of Laredo, and Klondike) | |

== August ==
| Date | Name | Age | Notability | Source |
|---|---|---|---|---|
| August 4 | Dick Albert | 73 | Meteorologist at WCVB-TV/Boston 1978–2009 | |
| August 5 | Richard O'Brien | 60 | Creative director at Fox News Channel, CNBC, and America's Talking | |
| August 8 | Glen Campbell | 81 | Country music singer/songwriter and actor (host of The Glen Campbell Goodtime Hour, appeared in the television films Strange Homecoming and Christmas in Disneyland, and an episode of The F.B.I.) | |
| August 8 | Barbara Cook | 89 | Singer and actress (appeared in episodes of Babes in Toyland, Golden Windows, Bloomer Girl, Armstrong Circle Theatre, Alfred Hitchcock Presents, The Perry Como Show, The Ed Sullivan Show, The Dinah Shore Chevy Show, The United States Steel Hour, and The Play of the Week) | |
| August 13 | Joseph Bologna | 82 | Actor (What Now, Catherine Curtis?, Rag to Riches, Superman: The Animated Series) | |
| August 19 | Dick Gregory | 84 | American comedian, actor, author, and activist (guest spots on Tonight Starring Jack Paar and Wonder Showzen) | |
| August 20 | Jerry Lewis | 91 | American comedian, actor, singer, personality, talk show host, and author, credited for being the co-founder and host of The Jerry Lewis MDA Labor Day Telethon from 1966 to 2010. Other notable work include The Colgate Comedy Hour, What's My Line?, Hullabaloo, Ben Casey, two versions of The Jerry Lewis Show, Wiseguy, The Bold Ones, The Simpsons, Mad About You and Law & Order: Special Victims Unit; pitchman for 7-Eleven, Diet Pepsi and Coca-Cola; narrator on the HBO documentary Rascal Dazzle; script contributor for Will the Real Jerry Lewis Please Sit Down | |
| August 23 | Viola Harris | 91 | Character actress (guest spots on several shows, including Peter Loves Mary, My Three Sons, Dr. Kildare, Hazel, and Law & Order) | |
| August 24 | Jay Thomas | 69 | Emmy Award-winning television/film actor, radio personality/music/programming director, voiceover actor/talent, and comedian (regular roles on Mork & Mindy and Love & War; recurring roles on Ray Donovan, Kate Joplin, Hercules, Married People, Murphy Brown, and Cheers) | |
| August 25 | Jack Keil | 94 | Advertising executive for Dancer Fitzgerald Sample, best known as the creator and voice of McGruff the Crime Dog | |
| August 26 | Tobe Hooper | 74 | Horror film/TV director, producer, and screenwriter (Haunted Lives: True Ghost Stories, I'm Dangerous Tonight, and Salem's Lot) | |
| August 31 | Richard Anderson | 91 | Actor, best known as Oscar Goldman on The Six Million Dollar Man and its spinoff The Bionic Woman | |
| August 31 | Novella Nelson | 77 | Character actress. Guest spots on numerous shows (Army Wives, The West Wing, Law & Order: Special Victims Unit), miniseries (Chiefs, Mama Flora's Family, The Starter Wife), and television films (Citizen Cohn, The Summer of Ben Tyler, Daybreak) | |

== September ==
| Date | Name | Age | Notability | Source |
|---|---|---|---|---|
| September 1 | Shelley Berman | 92 | Character actor (Curb Your Enthusiasm, The Twilight Zone, Bewitched, Peter Gunn, The Mary Tyler Moore Show, Adam-12, Emergency!, Brothers, Night Court, MacGyver, L.A. Law, Friends, Walker, Texas Ranger, The King of Queens, Grey's Anatomy, Boston Legal, Hannah Montana, CSI: NY, Hawaii Five-0, and Walter & Emily) | |
| September 1 | Peadar Lamb | 87 | Actor, best known as the voice of the title character in Jakers! The Adventures of Piggley Winks | |
| September 1 | Elizabeth Kemp | 65 | Actress, best known as Betsy Randall on Love of Life | |
| September 8 | Blake Heron | 35 | Actor, best known as Jordan Wells on Nick Freno: Licensed Teacher and Dellus on Good vs. Evil | |
| September 9 | Mike Hodge | 70 | Television and commercial actor, best known for recurring roles as the Judge on Ed and Judge Delano Burns on Law & Order; President of SAG-AFTRA New York | |
| September 10 | Don Ohlmeyer | 72 | Sports producer (most notably with ABC Sports and Monday Night Football) and executive with NBC | |
| September 11 | Howard Caldwell | 92 | Long-time news anchorman at WRTV Indianapolis | |
| September 11 | Mark LaMura | 68 | Actor, best known as Mark Dalton on All My Children | |
| September 13 | Frank Vincent | 80 | American actor (The Sopranos, The Paradise Club, Civil Wars, The Young Indiana Jones Chronicles, Walker, Texas Ranger, Swift Justice, New York Undercover, Law & Order, NYPD Blue, Law & Order: Special Victims Unit, Mr. Pickles) | |
| September 14 | Sean Adams | 46 | Reporter on Longhorn Network | |
| September 15 | Harry Dean Stanton | 91 | American actor (Inner Sanctum, The Texan, The Lineup, Rescue 8, Westinghouse Desilu Playhouse, Zane Grey Theatre, The Untouchables, The Lawless Years, Have Gun - Will Travel, Laramie, Bonanza, Rawhide, Gunsmoke, Daniel Boone, Mary Hartman, Mary Hartman, Young Maverick, Two and a Half Men, Big Love, Mongo Wrestling Alliance, Getting On and Twin Peaks) | |
| September 17 | Bobby Heenan | 72 | Legendary WWF and WCW manager and color commentator; member of the WWE Hall of Fame | |
| September 19 | Bernie Casey | 78 | NFL football player (San Francisco 49ers, Los Angeles Rams) and actor (recurring roles on Babylon 5, Star Trek: Deep Space Nine, Bay City Blues, The Sophisticated Gents, The Martian Chronicles, and Harris and Company) | |
| September 22 | David Lyle | 67 | TV executive (National Geographic Channel, FremantleMedia, Fox Reality Channel) | |
| September 26 | Barry Dennen | 79 | Actor (Batman, Galtar and the Golden Lance, Tales from the Darkside and Justice League: Throne of Atlantis). Also voice actor (DuckTales, Batman: The Animated Series, The Pirates of Dark Water, Animaniacs, Avatar: The Last Airbender and Star Wars: The Clone Wars) | |
| September 26 | Digby Diehl | 76 | Journalist, author, and commentator (Hollywood correspondent on CBS Morning News, literary correspondent on Good Morning America and film critic on KCBS-TV Los Angeles) | |
| September 27 | Hugh Hefner | 91 | American magazine journalist, publisher, entrepreneur, broadcaster and reality television personality (Founder of Playboy Enterprises and Playboy TV; host of Playboy After Dark and Playboy's Penthouse, star of The Girls Next Door, several appearances on Kendra on Top; guest spots include Laverne and Shirley, Rowan and Martin's Laugh-in, Saturday Night Live, The Simpsons, Family Guy, Robot Chicken, and MTV Cribs) | |
| September 27 | Anne Jeffreys | 94 | Actress, best known as Amanda Barrington on General Hospital | |
| September 30 | Monty Hall | 96 | Canadian-American game show host (Let's Make a Deal) and creator (Stefan Hatos-Monty Hall Productions) | |

== October ==
| Date | Name | Age | Notability | Source |
|---|---|---|---|---|
| October 1 | Dave Strader | 62 | NHL announcer (Detroit Red Wings, Dallas Stars, Phoenix Coyotes, Florida Panthers, St. Louis Blues, NBC, Versus, ESPN, Fox) | |
| October 1 | Samuel Irving Newhouse Jr. | 89 | American publisher and businessman (formerly owned Brighthouse Networks and held a controlling interest in Discovery Communications and a minority interest in Charter Communications) | |
| October 2 | Tom Petty | 66 | American Rock and Roll Hall of Fame singer, songwriter and guitarist (Tom Petty and the Heartbreakers, Traveling Wilburys, Mudcrutch). Appeared in several episodes of It's Garry Shandling's Show, a recurring role as Elroy "Lucky" Kleinschmidt on King of the Hill, a cameo on The Simpsons, and several appearances as the musical guest on Saturday Night Live. | |
| October 2 | Warren Burton | 72 | American actor (All My Children, Another World, Guiding Light, Santa Barbara, General Hospital, Valley of the Dolls and The New Adventures of Zorro) | |
| October 3 | Lance Russell | 91 | American professional wrestling announcer and commentator (CWA, USWA, WCW) | |
| October 6 | Ralphie May | 45 | American standup comedian. Appeared on the first season of Last Comic Standing, guest spots on The Tonight Show with Jay Leno and The Wayne Brady Show, recorded four specials for Comedy Central and two for Netflix. | |
| October 8 | Grady Tate | 85 | American jazz drummer and singer (Schoolhouse Rock!) | |
| October 10 | Bob Schiller | 98 | American two-time Emmy Award-winning screenwriter (I Love Lucy, All in the Family, Archie Bunker's Place, The Carol Burnett Show, Professional Father, The Jimmy Durante Show, It's Always Jan, That's My Boy, The Red Skelton Show, My Favorite Husband, The Lucy-Desi Comedy Hour, The Ann Sothern Show, Pete and Gladys, My Favorite Husband, The Phyllis Diller Show, and The Flip Wilson Show) and producer (The Good Guys, All's Fair, and Maude) | |
| October 16 | Roy Dotrice | 94 | British actor (American TV work includes Jacob "Father" Wells on Beauty and the Beast and Father Gary Barrett on Picket Fences) | |
| October 17 | Mychael Knight | 39 | American fashion designer, appeared on seasons 3 and 6 of Project Runway and season 3 of Rip the Runway | |
| October 17 | Michele Marsh | 63 | News anchor at New York City stations WCBS-TV and WNBC | |
| October 17 | John Dunsworth | 71 | Canadian actor, best known as Jim Lahey on Trailer Park Boys | |
| October 19 | Jim Nash | 73 | News anchor at Los Angeles station KTLA | |
| October 22 | Patricia Llewellyn | 55 | British producer (U.S. TV work includes Kitchen Nightmares, Hotel Hell, MasterChef, and MasterChef Junior). | |
| October 24 | Robert Guillaume | 89 | Two–time Emmy award-winning–actor, best known as Benson DuBois on Soap and its spinoff Benson; and Isaac Jaffe on Sports Night. | |
| October 25 | Jack Bannon | 77 | Actor, best known as Art Donovan on Lou Grant | |

== November ==
| Date | Name | Age | Notability | Source |
|---|---|---|---|---|
| November 1 | Brad Bufanda | 34 | Actor, best known as Felix Toombs on Veronica Mars and Larry on Co-Ed Confidential | |
| November 9 | John Hillerman | 84 | Actor, best known for his Emmy Award-winning role as Jonathan Higgins on Magnum, P.I.; also played Simon Brimmer on Ellery Queen | |
| November 14 | Nancy Zieman | 64 | Designer, quilting expert, and host of PBS' Sewing with Nancy | |
| November 16 | Ann Wedgeworth | 83 | American television, film, and stage actress/singer, best known for playing Lana Shields in Three’s Company, Angela 'Angie' Talbot on The Edge of Night, Lahoma Vane Lucas on both Another World and Somerset, Bootsie Westchester on Filthy Rich, Audrey Conner on Roseanne, and Merleen Eldridge on both Evening Shade and Harlan & Merleen. | |
| November 17 | Earle Hyman | 91 | Actor best known as Russell Huxtable on The Cosby Show and the voice of Panthro on ThunderCats | |
| November 17 | Robert D. Raiford | 89 | News anchor at WTOP-TV/Washington, DC and WCNC-TV/Charlotte, North Carolina and actor in several television films | |
| November 19 | Della Reese | 86 | American actress/singer, best known for playing Tess on Touched by an Angel, Victoria Royal on The Royal Family, and Della Rogers on Chico and the Man, among her numerous credits, as well as appearing on The Ed Sullivan Show a record 157 times, and hosting her own syndicated daytime talk show (1969–70), the first African American female to do so. | |
| November 19 | Charles Manson | 83 | American cult leader and convicted murderer of actress Sharon Tate and others, who was the subject of several TV documentaries, most notably Helter Skelter | |
| November 21 | Buzz Belmondo | 70 | Actor best known for playing Buzz on Out of This World; also had a recurring role on Baywatch | |
| November 21 | David Cassidy | 67 | Actor and singer best known as Keith Partridge on The Partridge Family | |
| November 25 | Rance Howard | 89 | American actor (recurring spots on Kraft Television Theatre, The Andy Griffith Show, Gentle Ben and Babylon 5, among numerous guest roles) and father of Clint Howard and Ron Howard | |
| November 25 | Steve "Snapper" Jones | 75 | American basketball player (New Orleans Buccaneers, Dallas Chaparrals, Portland Trail Blazers) and analyst (NBC, CBS, TNT, TBS, USA, NBA TV, Denver Nuggets) | |
| November 25 | Julio Oscar Mechoso | 62 | Character actor (recurring roles on Matador, Cane, Invasion, Greetings from Tucson, Damon, High Incident, Coach, Stat, and Miami Vice) | |
| November 29 | Heather North | 71 | American actress, portrayed Sandy Horton in Days of Our Lives from 1967 to 1971; second to voice Daphne Blake in the Scooby-Doo franchise from 1969 to 1985, and briefly reprised the role in 2003. | |
| November 30 | Jim Nabors | 87 | Actor best known for playing Gomer Pyle on The Andy Griffith Show and its spin-off Gomer Pyle, USMC, hosted The Jim Nabors Hour and The Jim Nabors Show, regular guest on The Carol Burnett Show and The Sonny & Cher Comedy Hour, and cast member of The Lost Saucer | |

== December ==
| Date | Name | Age | Notability | Source |
|---|---|---|---|---|
| December 3 | John B. Anderson | 95 | Politician who participated in the 1980 presidential debates, among other appearances. | |
| December 9 | Stu Evey | 84 | Broadcasting executive, chairman of ESPN from 1979 to 1984 | |
| December 14 | Bob Givens | 99 | Animator of several iconic characters including Bugs Bunny, Daffy Duck, Elmer Fudd, Tom and Jerry, Alvin and the Chipmunks, and Popeye | |
| December 15 | Darlanne Fluegel | 64 | American actress in To Live and Die in L.A., Freeway, Pet Sematary Two, Slaughter of the Innocents, Darkman III: Die Darkman Die, the first season of Crime Story, and the final season of Hunter | |
| December 19 | Richard Venture | 94 | Actor (The Days and Nights of Molly Dodd, Fame, Murder, She Wrote, and Seinfeld) | |
| December 21 | Dick Enberg | 82 | Sportscaster (lead announcer for the NFL on NBC from 1978 to 1998, also called basketball, baseball and tennis for NBC, CBS, ESPN and Fox Sports San Diego) | |
| December 24 | Heather Menzies-Urich | 68 | Canadian-born American television/film actress/singer, model, and health advocate. TV roles include Jessica 6 in Logan's Run and Charlotte Henderson in Vega$. | |
| December 26 | Jim Burns | 65 | Co-creator of MTV Unplugged | |
| December 26 | Irv Weinstein | 87 | News anchor (34 years at WKBW-TV in Buffalo, New York and key contributor of many elements to the Action News format) | |
| December 27 | Amanda Davis | 62 | Emmy Award-winning news anchor and reporter in the Atlanta market, notably at WAGA-TV (1986 to 2012) and WGCL (January 2017 until her death), WCNC-TV/Charlotte and the short-lived Satellite News Channel. | |
| December 28 | Rose Marie | 94 | American actress and game show panelist, best known for her portrayal of Sally Rogers on The Dick Van Dyke Show, Myrna Gibbons on The Doris Day Show and a regular on Hollywood Squares, among her numerous credits. | |
| December 28 | Sue Grafton | 77 | American television and film screenwriter turned author and novelist of the Alphabet mystery series (credits include Sex and the Single Parent, Mark, I Love You, Nurse, Walking Through the Fire, adaptations of Agatha Christie’s A Caribbean Mystery and Sparkling Cyanide, A Killer in the Family, Love on the Run, and Svengali) | |
| December 29 | Danny Breen | 67 | Actor (cast member on Not Necessarily the News, recurring role on Bill & Ted's Excellent Adventures, guest spots on The Golden Girls, Full House, Seinfeld, Frasier, and Curb Your Enthusiasm among numerous others), and producer (Whose Line Is It Anyway?, The Wayne Brady Show, and The Moment of Truth). Also performer at The Second City. | |

== See also ==
- 2017 in American television
- Deaths in 2017
