= List of Rob Dyrdek's Fantasy Factory episodes =

The following is an episode list for the MTV reality television series Rob Dyrdek's Fantasy Factory. The show follows the lives of professional skateboarder Rob Dyrdek, his cousin Drama, and the staff of The Fantasy Factory.

== Series overview ==
Season	Episodes	Originally released		DVD release date (Region 1)
Season	Episodes	First released	Last released	DVD release date (Region 1)
1	12	February 8, 2009	April 26, 2009	September 1, 2009
2	9	August 27, 2009	October 22, 2009	July 6, 2010
3	12	July 12, 2010	October 4, 2010	August 9, 2011
4	10	April 4, 2011	September 19, 2011	August 28, 2012
5	12	March 19, 2012	April 23, 2012	July 24, 2012
6	9	January 16, 2014	March 13, 2014	November 14, 2014
7	9	January 1, 2015	March 5, 2015	TBA

== Episodes ==
=== Season 1 (2009) ===
No. overall	No. in season	Title	Original release date
1	1	"Blob, Super Blob"	February 8, 2009
Introduction into how the Fantasy Factory came about, and then Rob has a 'Blob' Fantasy.
2	2	"Get with Your Power Animal"	February 15, 2009
DC hosts a party for Rob where Rob asks Ken Block if he can jump his rally car. Ken says yes so to prepare for it Rob hires a spirit shaman to find his power animal.
3	3	"Extreme Timmy!"	February 22, 2009
Rob helps Danny Way try to break the land speed record by driving the T-Rex. Danny Way breaks the record. Rob messes with Drama, saying Drama is Timmy's lover.
4	4	"Hotel, Motel...Robbie's Inn"	March 1, 2009
Rob is informed that an owner of a hotel in Las Vegas wants to sell the hotel to Rob. Rob also gets a zip line when checking out the hotel.
5	5	"Bangin' on Fools"	March 8, 2009
Drama wants a studio to help himself become a producer. Rob agrees to build the studio but says Drama has to see a hypnotherapist to see if he will stay determined. Rob builds Drama the Hand's Of God Studio. Rob gets a Tennis ball gun.
6	6	"This Is Not Mom-Certified"	March 15, 2009
Rob holds a screening of a film called "Street Dreams" about skateboarding. He invites his parents and makes them each a fantasy room at the factory.
7	7	"Shark Sugar"	March 22, 2009
Rob makes a line of toys, Wild Grinders. He also explores shark attack tourism.
8	8	"Unseen Footage"	March 29, 2009
Rob and the rest of the people at the fantasy factory show the unseen footage from season 1.
9	9	"No Mandals"	April 5, 2009
Rob builds a skate spot in Los Angeles sponsored by Carls Jr. He also breaks the world's biggest skateboard record.
10	10	"I Call Him Butter Feet"	April 12, 2009
Rob decides to help one of his fans, Cole Hernandez, make a dance video with cameo appearances by Johnny Knoxville, Eddie Barbanell, and Adam G. Sevani. Nitro Circus visits the Fantasy Factory.
11	11	"Best of and Behind the Scenes"	April 19, 2009
Rob and Drama show their favorite clips from Season 1.
12	12	"Dusty Monkey"	April 26, 2009
Rob holds a skate competition using his new grading system. He also drag races against Ryan Sheckler. After the drag race, Ryan and Chanel go on a date leaving in Ryan's car.

=== Season 2 (2009) ===
No. overall	No. in season	Title	Original release date
13	1	"Dirty Man-Horse"	August 27, 2009
Rob becomes a horse jockey. He nicknames himself "Bolt Speedman" and nicknames his horse "Megahorse" in honor of his old mini horse, and together, they participate in a race. Drama gets a bigger office and some mice.
14	2	"Natural Born Gymkhana-er"	September 3, 2009
Rob attempts the new sport of Gymkhana. He creates a video entitled "Gymkhana 2.1" with professional rally driver Ken Block. The Fantasy Factory crew also takes an IQ test to see who is the smartest in the Factory. The IQ tests result in: Geoff Taylor - 116, Tracy Tubera - 107, Chelsea "Chanel" Dudley - 94, Scott "Big Cat" Pfaff - 126, Tony Turbo - 100, Christopher "Drama" Pfaff - 113, Jeremy Larner - 118, and Rob Dyrdek - 101.
15	3	"Trust Your Pilot, Respect Your Monkey"	September 17, 2009
Rob get a visit from DJ Greyboy, who introduces him to the side-hack.
16	4	"Local Celebrity Almost Dies!"	September 17, 2009
After Rob and John Mayer stumble out of a nightclub and end up in the tabloids, they set out to class up and record a redemption song for Rob's mom.
17	5	"Best of, Bonus and Behind the Scenes"	September 24, 2009
Rob and Drama show their favorite clips and behind-the-scenes footage, so far, in Season 2.
18	6	"The Dyrdek Family Vacation"	October 1, 2009
Rob joins his family in Myrtle Beach to play with wild animals for his new DC Dyrdek Collection and to torment his mom with a fart machine.
19	7	"Lights Out"	October 8, 2009
Bobby Light makes a big return on stage with Travis Barker and Jeremy tries to play a prank on Rob.
20	8	"The Berrics vs. Fantasy Factory"	October 15, 2009
Rob challenges Steve Berra's crew to a duel of skate parks and takes a ride in an F-16 jet.
21	9	"Making Moves"	October 22, 2009
Rob invites Ludacris and NBA star Carmelo Anthony to the Fantasy Factory to discuss a friendly charitable wager between the three of them. Rob also tries desperately to teach his young cousin, Drama, the joy of doing nice things for people.

=== Season 3 (2010) ===
No. overall	No. in season	Title	Original release date	USA viewers (millions)
N–A	N–A	"Who is Rob Dyrdek?"	July 5, 2010	
In this documentary episode, MTV takes a closer look at the road that led Rob to where he is today. Featuring archival/never before seen clips from Rob & Big and Fantasy Factory and the DC Video that started his television career. Note: This was billed as a special bonus episode not part of the main season.
22	1	"This Is a Skateboard Car"	July 12, 2010	1.14
Rob teams up with professional drifter, Vaughn Gittin Jr., to create the world's very first Skateboarding Car. Rob also moves Drama into a brand new office next to his own atop the Fantasy Factory skate plaza.
23	2	"Live Your Brand"	July 19, 2010	1.07
Rob calls Drama out for living a pretty careful existence. To help his young cousin learn to truly live his brand, Rob enlists the help of the notoriously reckless Chad Ochocinco.
24	3	"Cheese Ballers!"	July 26, 2010	0.93
Rob tries to create the most expensive grilled cheese ever and enter it in a grilled cheese contest, while he helps professional skateboarder Torey Pudwill promote his new company.
25	4	"It's Barry... Barry Bright!"	August 2, 2010	1.07
Rob creates an alter-ego named Barry Bright and films an entire infomercial to promote the new device, called the iCore Cruncher. Rob also helps Chanel take her career to the next level by landing her a spread in Maxim magazine.
26	5	"Fantasy Factory's Sketchiest Moments"	August 9, 2010	1.05
Rob and Drama recap some of the sketchiest and scariest moments of all three seasons of Fantasy Factory. Consists of behind-the-scenes commentary, unseen footage, and some of the most memorable scenes from the series.
27	6	"Operation: Save Patty"	August 16, 2010	1.05
Rob finds out that his mom, Patty, has fallen and shattered her ankle he embarks on, "Operation: Save Patty", a mission to travel to Kettering, Ohio to make sure his parents' household is a more comfortable environment for his injured mom. Also Rob tries to disprove Patty's theory that he isn't a funny person by performing stand-up comedy at the Funny Bone comedy stage.
28	7	"He's Just a Little Mini-Pig"	August 23, 2010	0.95
Rob challenges his manager, Jeremy, to a happiness contest, when he discovers that Jeremy is a devout follower of Indian spiritual guru, Sri Sri Ravi Shankar and that Jeremy considers Rob's version of happiness only "transitory." He agrees to take a spiritual journey with Jeremy, as long as Jeremy agrees to take part in some good, old-fashioned Fantasy Factory fun. Rob also reluctantly takes on the role of mini-pig sitter for the week.
29	8	"I'm an Awkward Enabler!"	August 30, 2010	1.15
To help Big Cat with his awkwardness, Rob brings in a specialist and organizes an Awkward Intervention with everyone at the Fantasy Factory. Rob also signs a deal with 7-11 to build another Safe Spot Skate Spot in a park in North Hollywood. As part of the deal, 7-11 agrees to let Rob convert a local 7-11 into a Dyrdek themed store.
30	9	"Best of, Bonus and Behind the Scenes"	August 30, 2010	1.04
Rob and Drama look back on some of their favorite scenes from Season 3, share some bonus scenes that didn't make it into the episodes, and take a look at some behind-the-scenes moments with the Fantasy Factory crew. Filled with never-before-seen footage, this is a peek inside exactly what happens inside the Fantasy Factory.
31	10	"Hawaiian Manventure"	September 20, 2010	0.78
Laird Hamilton invites Rob and Drama to Kauai for some tow-in surfing. Although he has never surfed before, Rob decides it's time to up his "man level" by taking on a big wave. Joining them on their Manventure is super-athlete and legendary skateboarder, Danny Way. Along the way, the guys go squid fishing, have a traditional Luau, and visit Laird's "man camp."
32	11	"WWII...1972"	September 27, 2010	0.82
Rob and Drama go deep undercover as old men, to get a feel for the style and vocabulary of the older generation. On a mission to discover alternative swear words, while discovering old fashion, the two become "Stanley" Dyrdek and "Russell" Pfaff, two distinguished older gentlemen with a flair for style. Chanel pitches Rob a new invention inspired by a bra strap.
33	12	"Jingle Z"	October 4, 2010	1.06
Rob starts a charity that promotes skateboarding to underprivileged kids and creates a mascot, Skatie, and creates a jingle for a product. Panasonic sponsors Rob's charity for his jingle and his charity raises a large amount of money. The season ends with a bang when celebrities visit Rob's benefit and the after party.

=== Season 4 (2011) ===
No. overall	No. in season	Title	Original release date	USA viewers (millions)
34	1	"Welcome, Big Black"	April 4, 2011	1.68
In this season four premiere, Justin Bieber visits the Fantasy Factory where Rob convinces him that the only way to earn real respect is to do crazy things. Rob realizes he should take his own advice, and finds a place that will let him get chased down by a 400 pound tiger. Big Black, Rob's old friend and former roommate, visits the Fantasy Factory and moves into a temporary office in Corpo.
35	2	"Project Man Dime"	April 11, 2011	1.24
When Rob discovers that Drama is planning to get a full mouth of veneers, he begins a mission to convert his cousin into a "perfect ten in the form of a man," a full fledged "Man Dime." He enlists the help of Big Black to get Drama hair extensions, a spray tan, and a full body waxing, all in preparation for a modeling photo shoot in the factory. Rob is also invited to race professional Torc Truck driver Casey Currie.
36	3	"The Bleeding Frogs"	April 18, 2011	1.42
When The Athiarchists from Eugene, OR, pull up in a mobile stage outside of the Fantasy Factory, Rob invites them into the building for an impromptu performance. Inspired by their lifestyle and music, Rob decides to form a "death metal kill pop" band called The Bleeding Frogs with Chanel, Drama, Big Black and the two traveling musicians-Aaron & Dano.
37	4	"Dodging Devil Donkeys"	April 25, 2011	1.30
Rob and his crew decide to start a dodgeball team. While they are practicing, Chanel gets hit in the face by one of Big Cat's throw. When the team is warming up for another round, Rob decides to kick the ball and "accidentally" hits Chanel in the face. Chanel is then scared and wears a mask for the whole game they play in.
38	5	"Best of, Bonus and Behind the Scenes"	May 2, 2011	0.86
Rob and the crew show you extra clip you haven't seen before and clips from episodes still to come.
39	6	"Ginger Lion"	May 9, 2011	1.23
Rob decides to make his Mom Patty a star on the TV by putting her in his new commercial for his new Mastercard/debit card for teens. Bigcat loses a bet with Rob and as a punishment Rob dresses him up in a full lion outfit with a ginger mane.
40	7	"Kid Lightning"	May 16, 2011	1.02
With the help of wrestler "Rowdy" Roddy Piper, Rob surprises some Make-A-Wish kids with a kick-ass performance at a Wrestlemania Axxess event in Atlanta before Wrestlemania XXVII, as they face Tyson Kidd and Zack Ryder in a tag team match.
41	8	"Joe C. and the Magic Goatee"	May 23, 2011	0.90
Rob and his crew head down to Louisiana to repair a worn down skate park, and they honor master builder Joe Ciaglia in the Mardi Gras parade.
42	9	"Brother Bond"	September 12, 2011	0.70
Rob worries that Drama and Big Cat have lost their brotherly bond, and decides to run them through a series of bonding activities, including hug therapy. Meanwhile, Devo members Gerald and Bob Casale help Rob create the theme song of his new clip show on MTV, Ridiculousness, using samples from their song "Uncontrollable Urge".
43	10	"Phoenix of Love"	September 19, 2011	0.99
Rob and Big Black try to cheer up Drama after he breaks up with his girlfriend.

=== Season 5 (2012) ===
No. overall	No. in season	Title	Original release date	USA viewers (millions)
44	1	"Super Sonic Rob"	March 19, 2012	1.30
Rob goes into full stuntman mode as he prepares to kick flip a car, and Big Cat undergoes a pasty makeover.
45	2	"We're in the Burrito Game!"	March 19, 2012	1.33
Drama prepares for a bull fight with the help of former 'Jackass' stars Johnny Knoxville and Chris Pontius, and Rob tries to solve Big Black's foot problems.
46	3	"Chunky as Charged"	March 26, 2012	1.61
Big Black wants to show plus-size ladies some love for the re-launch of his Do Work t-shirts. Bobby Light returns as "Blobby Light" to help Big Black make a music video for his brand.
47	4	"You Can Never Be Too Big"	March 26, 2012	1.45
When Big Black is given the opportunity of a lifetime to become the spokesperson for the male-enhancement pill, Extenze, Rob steps in to help.
48	5	"Eat My Cookie"	April 2, 2012	1.122
Rob, with the help of Drama and Big Black, write a more G-rated version of Chanel's provocative new song "Eat My Cookie" to perform in her show at The Roxy.
49	6	"Full Scale, Full-Fledged, Certified Minister"	April 2, 2012	1.316
The Fantasy Factory has its first wedding after Rob becomes an ordained minister. He also bonds with his soon to be brother-in-law with a grizzly bear and an ATV.
50	7	"I'm Livin' It"	April 9, 2012	1.11
Rob writes a musical about Drama's life as a birthday present. Also, Rob and longtime pro skater friend, Steve Berra, accidentally invent their own sport, turning it into a bet after Rob wants to turn Steve's old warehouse into a second Fantasy Factory.
51	8	"Best of, Bonus and Behind the Scenes"	April 9, 2012	1.18
Rob and the cast take us through some of the craziest and funniest moments captured in Season 5 in this never before seen footage.
52	9	"Thy Kingdom of Fantasy Factory"	April 16, 2012	1.348
Rob enlists his friends to take part in a live-action role-playing (LARP) game by dressing up and defending the honor of the Fantasy Factory whilst trying to obtain the final designs to his new skateboarding trading card game.
53	10	"Dyrdek Day"	April 16, 2012	1.313
After talking to Chanel about the ghost that haunts her, Rob hires two mediums and a ghost detector to help Chanel identify the unwanted ghost. Also, The city of Los Angeles declares Feb. 1, 2012, "Rob Dyrdek Day."
54	11	"Big Black's Dump Truck"	April 23, 2012	1.26
Rob helps Big Black create a gourmet food truck called "Big Black's Dump Truck", with dishes designed to make people go to the bathroom. Meanwhile, Rob is determined to make the second season of his MTV clip show "Ridiculousness" better by enrolling the cast in improv classes and hypnotizing Chanel to be funnier.
55	12	"I'm an Alien!"	April 23, 2012	1.34
Drama and Chanel enter the Cover Miss and Cover Boy beauty pageant to see who is more beautiful. Rob transforms into a creepy stage father and decides the loser has to take a picture with their face pressed against Big Black's butt cheek. Rob also becomes convinced that he is an alien and meets with Riley Martin, a famous alien abductee, to help guide his quest to the mothership for a business meeting about his skate company.

=== Season 6 (2014) ===
No. overall	No. in season	Title	Original release date	USA viewers (millions)
56	1	"Movie Stars"	January 16, 2014	1.27
Rob and Big Black take a shot at becoming action movie stars, Drama gets help getting in touch with his roots.
57	2	"Born A Lion"	January 23, 2014	0.96
Rob helps Big Cat live out his Born a Lion brand; the Fantasy Factory takes on Dude Perfect.
58	3	"Butt Brothers"	January 30, 2014	0.84
Big Black asks for help in making his bum look good for a medical exam; Chanel trains in order to protect herself from stalkers.
59	4	"Shoe Trees"	February 6, 2014	1.09
Rob and Big create an infomercial about shoe trees; Rob discovers Drama's old diary.
60	5	"Ultimate Funcle"	February 13, 2014	1.26
Rob travels to Ohio to meet his newly born nephew, while there, he prepares his parents for the apocalypse.
61	6	"Big Black's BBW Round-Up"	February 20, 2014	1.10
Rob and Drama help Big Black search for a woman to love; Sterling performs in a sketch comedy showcase.
62	7	"Snack Off"	February 27, 2014	0.89
Big Black attempts to win the golden spork on an episode of Snack Off; Big Cat trains for the MMA.
63	8	"Fully Uploaded"	March 6, 2014	1.02
Chanel is "fully uploaded" by Freddie Wong; finding the perfect driver for his new "street jet."
64	9	"Bor Kedryd"	March 13, 2014	1.40
Rob tries to break a record for jumping a car backwards; Big Black gets the opportunity to make up for lost time. Note: This episode is a one-hour special episode and was at the time promoted as the series finale. However, the show would be renewed for a seventh season in June of 2014.
N–A	N–A	"Best of, Bonus and Behind the Scenes"	March 20, 2014	1.05
Highlights from the season and unseen footage. Note: This was billed as a special bonus episode not part of the main season.

=== Season 7 (2015) ===
No. overall	No. in season	Title	Original release date	USA viewers (millions)
65	1	"Robert Lightfoot and Silky Black"	January 1, 2015	0.88
Big Cat locks in a date with an Instagram fan; Rob and Big Black become a smooth jazz duo to help perfect the night.
66	2	"600 Horsepower of American Muscle"	January 8, 2015	0.76
Skateboarding prodigy Jagger Eaton gets a shot at hosting Ridiculousness.
67	3	"Strike Slinger and the Bowl Bear"	January 15, 2015	0.71
Rob gets help directing Chanel's new music video; feeling left out of Drama and Sterling's bowling nights, Rob and Big challenge them to a bowl-off.
68	4	"The Clean Hole Alliance"	January 22, 2015	0.74
Rob wants to create a public service announcement about maintaining a clean backside after a leakage incident.
69	5	"Big Black Forest Ham and the Foot Long Kid"	January 29, 2015	0.79
Rob and Big Black have Subway Jared's black card, and decide to hand out subs on the streets of Los Angeles.
70	6	"Happy Meter"	February 5, 2015	0.80
When Rob sees a unique racing trophy in Big Cat's cage, he challenges Cat and Drama to an ostrich race where the loser has to drink the contents of an ostrich egg.
71	7	"Patty's Bucket List"	February 12, 2015	0.83
Rob helps Patty cross items off her bucket list for her 70th birthday, including a guest appearance on The Bold and the Beautiful.
72	8	"TTFL and the Old War Dog"	February 19, 2015	0.83
The Petersen Automotive Museum offers to add two of Rob's cars to its collection; Rob decides to put the Old War Dog down.
N–A	N–A	"Best of, Bonus, and Behind the Scenes of Season 7"	February 26, 2015	N/A
Rob, Big Black and the cast shares highlights from the season, outtakes and bonus footage.
73	9	"Final Final Finale"	March 5, 2015	0.72
Rob hosts a group of "Make a Wish" children at the Factory, and the cast helps him create a magical experience for them.
