= List of Rob & Big episodes =

The following is an episode list for the MTV television series Rob & Big. The show follows the lives of professional skateboarder Rob Dyrdek and his best friend and bodyguard Christopher "Big Black" Boykin. The series premiered on November 2, 2006, and featured eight episodes in each of its first and second seasons and sixteen episodes in the concluding third season. Along with the regular episodes, the series feature three recap specials.

== Series overview ==
| Season | Episodes | Originally released | |
| Season | Episodes | First released | Last released |
|---|---|---|---|
| 1 | 8 | November 2, 2006 | December 21, 2006 |
| 2 | 8 | May 22, 2007 | July 10, 2007 |
| 3 | 15 | January 8, 2008 | April 15, 2008 |

== Episodes ==
=== Season 1 (2006) ===
| No. overall | No. in season | Title | Original release date |
|---|---|---|---|
| 1 | 1 | "Moving In" | November 2, 2006 |
After moving in, Big Black suggests to Rob that they get a bulldog, to complete the new family. The two fly to Arizona on a private jet to pick up their new little puppy. To welcome their new family member, the guys host a party with a surprise appearance by Three Six Mafia.
| 2 | 2 | "Go Skate Day" | November 9, 2006 |
On National Skateboarding Day, Rob attempts to get both Big Black and the bulldog "Meaty," on a skateboard, with mixed results. Later on the way to a skate demo in Orange County, the two get pulled over for "Ridin' Dirty."
| 3 | 3 | "Travel" | November 16, 2006 |
Rob and Big Black travel to Vancouver to be "immortalized in a video game." After a day of motion capture in tight-fitting spandex and a game of skateboard hockey with the locals, they continue on to Kettering, Ohio to visit Rob's family. Fishing with Rob's dad, a quick jaunt to King's Island amusement park and shredding Rob's skate plaza are all stops on their whirlwind trip out of the Hollywood Hills.
| 4 | 4 | "Let's Get Physical" | November 23, 2006 |
Rob puts Big Black on a fitness program to help him lose some weight. They consult with a hypnotist and a nutritionist on their quest to make him a leaner, meaner, more finely tuned machine.
| 5 | 5 | "Happy Birthday" | November 30, 2006 |
All Rob wants for his birthday is for Big Black to win a Wing Eating Trophy at the local hot wings restaurant. Big Black plans Rob's birthday evening, but In the midst of the birthday preparation, Meaty suffers from a mysterious "body odor" issue that must be addressed.
| 6 | 6 | "Making the House a Home" | December 7, 2006 |
Rob and Big Black make some home improvements at their Hollywood Hills pad. Meaty temporarily derails their plans when he gets into the garbage and gets sick eating too many chicken wings.
| 7 | 7 | "Security" | December 14, 2006 |
When a dog psychic tells Rob and Big Black that Meaty needs a woman in the house, the two visit a Matchmaker to set up a blind double date. Unfortunately, the dates are not quite what the guys had in mind.
| 8 | 8 | "Do Work" | December 21, 2006 |
After Rob has a nightmare about dying, Big Black decides to brush up on his security skills to ensure that Rob feels safe. Big Black practices evasive driving, works on his Martial Arts moves and even shows his combat maneuvers on the paintball field.

=== Season 2 (2007) ===
| No. overall | No. in season | Title | Original release date |
|---|---|---|---|
| 9 | 1 | "Meaty and Mini" | May 22, 2007 |
Life in the Rob and Big household changes dramatically when the guys discover that their bulldog, Meaty, needs a little buddy. After a little research, Rob finds the perfect companion for his favorite puppy: a Mini-Horse. Owning miniature livestock turns out to be a little more than the guys bargained for, and drastic measures become necessary to accommodate the tiny horse.
| 10 | 2 | "Time Travel" | May 29, 2007 |
An airbrushed van leads Rob and Big Black on a quest to travel through time with Rob's "Hyper-Dimensional Resonator." Big Black is skeptical, but Rob convinces him to travel to Montreal to visit a "time travel expert" named Dr. Z. When they return to LA, Big Black surprises Rob with his own, throwback version of Time Travel.
| 11 | 3 | "Mississippi" | June 5, 2007 |
Rob is thrown deep into the "Dirty South" when Big Black invites him to Sylvarena, Mississippi, for the Boykin family reunion. The boys overdose on southern cooking, southern living, and Big Black's crazy Uncle Jerry.
| 12 | 4 | "Assistant Drama" | June 12, 2007 |
Rob and Big Black call out Drama, Rob's cousin, for being a lazy assistant and decide to put him on "waivers" until he shapes up. When Drama is seemingly unfazed by the threat, Rob threatens Drama by interviewing a professional executive assistant as a potential replacement. On top of that, the guys struggle with an "aggressive mini horse." In the end, Rob and Big Black figure out a way to remind both Drama and Mini Horse how good they all have it in the Hollywood Hills.
| 13 | 5 | "Strip Show" | June 19, 2007 |
Big Black reveals to Rob that he used to be a male stripper with the stage name "Black Lavender" for a brief time back when he had a full head of hair. The two decide it's time to resurrect Black Lavender for one last show at a Hollywood strip club, but not before they find him a brand new head of hair.
| 14 | 6 | "Tampa" | June 26, 2007 |
After five years away from professional skate competitions, Rob decides to enter the world famous Tampa Pro contest in Tampa, Florida. Rob and Big Black hit gator country with pals, Steve Berra and Bam Bam, and before the contest begins, the foursome head out to Tampa Bay for a little high-flying water adventure. Rob and Berra shake on a $5,000 side bet to see who places higher in the Tampa Pro, and Rob threatens to "make it rain" with Berra's money, if he wins.
| 15 | 7 | "Bobby Light" | July 3, 2007 |
Rob reinvents himself as Bobby Light, a self-proclaimed "one hit wonder, R&B sensation." With the help of his cousin, Drama, and The Chunky Boys (Big Black and Bam Bam), Rob hops into the makeshift recording studio in Big Black's closet and records a song called "Dirty Girl." Rob and Big Black decide to shoot a low-budget music video for their hot new song, but realize the video will not be complete until they fly Big Black's Uncle Jerry out to Los Angeles to take a starring role.
| 16 | 8 | "New Cars" | July 10, 2007 |
Rob and Big Black both add a new car to their growing collection of vehicles. In order to make room for the new rides, Rob plans to give away his old truck (the UAV) to the first skater that can beat him in a game of "S-K-8" and beat Big Black in a game of Rochambeau (Rock, Paper Scissors). Later, Rob is both shocked and bemused to find himself dubbed a "C-Lister" on the cover of the Wall Street Journal.

=== Season 3 (2008) ===
| No. overall | No. in season | Title | Original release date |
|---|---|---|---|
| 17 | 1 | "Poop in the Pool" | January 8, 2008 |
When Rob and Big Black discover a "mystery poop" floating in the pool, they turn into amateur crime-solvers, eyeing Drama, Rob's cousin/assistant, as the prime-suspect. The guys decide to beef up security at the house and hire a polygraphical expert to question Drama. Making the best of a nasty situation, Rob and Big Black hire a muralist, to give their newly drained pool some extra flair.
| 18 | 2 | "Turtle Racing" | January 15, 2008 |
Rob and Big Black take a new-found hobby to the extreme when they discover turtle racing at a local bar. After struggling with a deadbeat rental turtle, they decide to pluck a "hood turtle" out of the wild and train it to be the fastest turtle in the world. They also have an unpleasant run-in with a web-slinging superhero along the way.
| 19 | 3 | "Mini-Horse Competition" | January 22, 2008 |
Rob and Big Black think it's high time to show off their beloved animal by entering him in a mini-horse competition. However, the only competition available is in far-off Santa Rosa, California. The boys make it into an old-fashioned California road trip with the whole family: Rob, Big, Mini and Meaty. If riding together in the UAV isn't cramped enough, all four mates stuffed in a two-person hotel room should do the trick.
| 20 | 4 | "Meaty Goes to Hollywood" | January 29, 2008 |
Rob and Big Black try to land themselves on the cover of a cereal box, but discover that the world of print modeling is not as easy to crack as they had hoped. Switching gears, they focus their efforts on Meaty, who has almost instant success as a doggie model. Refusing to give up on their own dream, the guys come up with a creative way to be box cover models.
| 21 | 5 | "Guinness World Records" | February 5, 2008 |
Smashing records is the name of the game when Rob picks up a copy of The Guinness Book and sets his sights on breaking every skateboarding record listed. Not to be outdone, Big Black finds a couple of power-eating records he feels confident that he can shatter. Hapless Drama gets put on "crotch drying duty" for Big Black.
| 22 | 6 | "Big Bob" | February 12, 2008 |
Big Black tries to convince Rob that there are hardships to being a big man in America. Unconvinced, Rob decides to find out for himself by agreeing to be fitted for a head-to-toe fat suit. "Big Bob" is born, and the two men hit the streets to see how the world reacts to Rob Dyrdek as a seven foot, 400 pounder.
| 23 | 7 | "Charity" | February 19, 2008 |
A charitable ice cream man inspires Rob and Big Black to begin their own altruistic crusade, ranging from handouts at skid row to spending time with frisky seniors at an old folks home. Also, Rob and Big Black challenge their 6'9" friend, Zeus, to hop on a BMX and take a disastrous ride down a local mini ramp.
| 24 | 8 | "Harry the Healer" | February 26, 2008 |
Rob enlists the help of a street shaman to help improve his spiritual awareness and skateboarding.
| 25 | 9 | "Dating Game" | March 11, 2008 |
Big Black plays matchmaker after Rob finds a pair of women's gloves in his bedroom. The guys buy remote-control helicopters, then have a hard time mastering them.
| 26 | 10 | "Vegas" | March 18, 2008 |
Rob and Big Black take the whole crew to Las Vegas to celebrate Drama's 21st birthday. Skateboarding great Danny Way joins them, and they stop along the way for some shredding.
| 27 | 11 | "Meaty's Birthday" | March 25, 2008 |
Rob and Big plan an over-the-top "Super Sweet Fourteen" bash for their beloved puppy.
| 28 | 12 | "Parents" | April 1, 2008 |
Rob tortures his mother when the Dyrdek family pays a visit to Hollywood.
| 29 | 13 | "Cancun" | April 8, 2008 |
Rob and Big vacation in Cancun, Mexico. Here they experiment with wrestling attire and Rob prepares to perform as "Bobby Light."
| 30 | 14 | "Haunted House" | April 15, 2008 |
The guys try ghostbusting when Rob feels a supernatural presence in the house and thinks it must be the cause of their rat infestation. They hire an exterminator, a psychic, a demonologist and a landscaper to deal with their problems.
| 31 | 15 | "Baby" | April 15, 2008 |
Big Black announces he's expecting a baby and that he'll be moving out of his home with Rob.

== Specials ==
| No. | Title | Original air date |
|---|---|---|
| SP1 | "Top 5 Biggest" | February 16, 2007 |
Rob and Big review the top 5 biggest moments of season 1.
| SP2 | "Best of Season 2" | July 12, 2007 |
Rob & Big go over the best moments of season 2.
| SP3 | "Best, Worst, and Unused" | March 4, 2008 |
In this episode, Rob and Big look back on Season 3 and weigh in on their victories and disappointments. They also screen several unseen moments as well as some sneak peeks at moments yet to come in the season.
