= Richard O'Brien (Fox News) =

Richard "Rich" O'Brien (August 1956 – August 5, 2017) was an American television creative director known for his work at Fox News, where he worked from 1996 until his job was eliminated in May 2017. At Fox, he eventually became a senior vice president and creative director.

== Biography ==
O'Brien was born in Connecticut. Before joining Fox, he worked as a creative director at CNBC, and later helped create America's Talking, which later became MSNBC. A 2001 New York Times Magazine article described O'Brien as one of "the two sides of FNC's brain," with the other being John Moody.
