= Big Rig Bounty Hunters =

American reality TV program

- Genre: Reality
- Starring: Animal & Steve Irwin; Shawn Zimmerman & Vince Jones; Jaxon; Korchenko & Marshall Clements; Eric & Rob Johnson; John Picinic & Gene Marino; Michael Hoffman & Chad Taliaferro; Big T & Bek; Danny & Willie Holden; Dave & Don Wolf
- Composer: Adam Sanborne
- Country of origin: United States
- Original language: English
- No. of seasons: 2
- No. of episodes: 20

Production
- Executive producers: Aengus James; Colin King Miller; Ted Woerner
- Running time: 42 minutes
- Production company: This is Just a Test Productions

Original release
- Network: History
- Release: February 14, 2013 – June 30, 2014

Big Rig Bounty Hunters is an American reality TV program, which aired from February 14, 2013, to June 30, 2014, on the History Channel. The series followed bounty hunters who search for and retrieve lost, stolen, or otherwise missing tractor-trailer rigs, and, in some cases, towed vehicles and cargo on trailers. The show comprised recreations of situations that may or may not have happened in real life. After the final episode of season 2 aired on June 30, 2014, no further news came of the show, and the History Channel removed the show's page from their website.

The style of the show is somewhat similar to another show on the History Channel dealing with operation of large trucks, Ice Road Truckers. The show highlights the contrived activities of several crews of recovery agents all over the US who perform various recoveries of stolen or abandoned vehicles or rescues of incapacitated vehicles. The men get paid for their recovery actions and can receive bonuses for successful recovery of the cargo or contents of the trailers.

On March 22, 2017, Vince Jones, a star on the show died of a suspected heart attack. He had a condition known as sleep apnea, and he wasn't wearing his CPAP mask the night he died, which possibly contributed to his death.

== Episodes ==
=== Season 1 (2013) ===
No. overall	No. in season	Title	Original release date	US viewers (millions)
1	1	"Tracked"	February 14, 2013	2.40
Firstly, a driver abandons a rig containing food needing delivered to a grocery company's warehouse in Denver before close of business that day. The bounty hunters arrive late for their delivery, but the receiving clerk decides to accept the load because roads all over town were slowed or closed because President Barack Obama had visited the Denver area that day. Secondly, a pickup truck pulling a trailer with over $100,000 in cattle is stopped on a railroad track, and the recovery team has to get someone out there with a new truck and a tow truck, hopefully before the fast freight coming through the area gets to that crossing. The railroad is having trouble reaching the engineer; if there is an accident, the Texas Railroad Commission will be very upset, plus the truck is worth $50,000 and if there is an accident some of the cattle might be killed. While the team is working to tow the truck and trailer from the crossing, off in the distance the train's horn can be heard as the train is quickly approaching. With only seconds to spare, they get the truck and load of cattle clear of the track just before the train rolls through. Lastly, a truck with a cargo of expensive electronics was stolen in New Jersey and the recovery agents want to try to find it. One of them has connections with a man who is connected to the criminal underworld, and after his associate makes some phone calls, discovers the load was stolen but the truck was simply abandoned. He now has to try to find the trailer. He ends up finding it, but to add insult to injury, the tires on the trailer - worth about $1500 - have also been stolen, so he has to get new tires and take it back to the owner, plus, since he wasn't able to recover the load, he won't get an additional bonus.
2	2	"Fight and Flight"	February 21, 2013	N/A
3	3	"Chase and Space"	February 28, 2013	2.22
4	4	"Snakes and Robbers"	March 7, 2013	N/A
5	5	"Goin' Country"	March 14, 2013	2.27
6	6	"Lost and Found"	March 21, 2013	N/A
7	7	"Grand Theft Big Rig"	March 28, 2013	2.48
8	8	"On the Line"	April 4, 2013	N/A

=== Season 2 (2014) ===
No. overall	No. in season	Title	Original release date	US viewers (millions)
9	1	"Hotwired"	May 22, 2014	N/A
10	2	"Dead on Arrival"	May 22, 2014	N/A
11	3	"Identity Theft"	May 29, 2014	N/A
12	4	"High Steaks"	May 29, 2014	N/A
13	5	"Red Hot"	June 9, 2014	N/A
14	6	"Big Rig Chill"	June 9, 2014	N/A
15	7	"Road Rage"	June 16, 2014	N/A
16	8	"Pipe Pursuit"	June 16, 2014	N/A
17	9	"Raging Bull"	June 23, 2014	N/A
18	10	"Chasing Money"	June 23, 2014	N/A
19	11	"Monster Mash"	June 30, 2014	N/A
20	12	"At Risk Driver"	June 30, 2014	N/A
