= Rob Dyrdek's Fantasy Factory =

American reality television series

- Genre: Reality
- Starring: Rob Dyrdek; Chanel West Coast; Chris "Drama" Pfaff; Christopher "Big Black" Boykin; Scott "Big Cat" Pfaff; Sterling "Steelo" Brim
- Theme music composer: Aldo Nova
- Opening theme: "Fantasy", performed by Steel Panther
- Country of origin: United States
- Original language: English
- No. of seasons: 7
- No. of episodes: 73 (list of episodes)

Production
- Executive producers: Christian Duguay; Jeff Tremaine; Kristina Edwards; Lauren Dolgen; Michelle Klepper; Rob Dyrdek; Sara Cohen; Sara Lager; Shane Nickerson; Hendry Ford; Michael Jack Tonkin
- Running time: 22 to 24 minutes
- Production companies: Dickhouse Productions; Gorilla Flicks

Original release
- Network: MTV
- Release: February 8, 2009 – March 5, 2015

Related
- Rob & Big

Rob Dyrdek's Fantasy Factory is an American reality television series that aired on MTV from February 8, 2009, to March 5, 2015.

On September 17, 2013, Fantasy Factory was renewed for a sixth season, which premiered on January 16, 2014. The sixth season was originally announced to be the final season, but in June 2014, MTV announced that Fantasy Factory would return for a seventh season. The seventh season premiered on January 1, 2015, and ended on March 5, 2015.

As of 2022, the entire series is available to stream on Paramount+, except for a few episodes.

== Synopsis ==
The factory is a space for skateboarder Rob Dyrdek to manage two aspects of his life, business and pleasure. The 25,000-square-foot complex contains two distinct areas: A warehouse designed for skateboarding and an office complex. Dyrdek's cousin, Christopher "Drama" Pfaff serves as Dyrdek's assistant on the show. Christopher "Big Black" Boykin, originally from Rob & Big, made his debut appearance to the Fantasy Factory beginning in the fourth season. Rashawn "Bam Bam" Davis, who co-starred with Rob, Big Black, and Drama in Rob & Big, made his first appearance in the Fantasy Factory on the third episode of Season 5.

Throughout the series, guest appearances included Ryan Sheckler, John Mayer, Danny Way, Steve Berra, Ludacris, as well as Johnny Knoxville and Chris Pontius from Jackass.

== Production ==
The Fantasy Factory was located in an industrial building addressed at 777 South Mission Road, Los Angeles, California, that was previously a distribution center for Super King Markets (which has since returned to the property) and is located next to the company's corporate headquarters and the Los Angeles River. Following the end of the show, all elements of the show were demolished and removed from the property.

== Cast ==
- Rob Dyrdek, professional skateboarder, president of Dyrdek Enterprises, Street League Skateboarding, Rob Dyrdek's Wild Grinders, former star of Rob & Big and creator and host of Ridiculousness
- Sterling "Steelo" Brim, friend of Rob Dyrdek and co-host with him on MTV's Ridiculousness
- Christopher "Big Black" Boykin (Seasons 4–7), Rob's former bodyguard and roommate, co-star of Rob & Big
- Chanel West Coast, Fantasy Factory's receptionist, secretary, Young & Reckless model, co-host on Ridiculousness
- Christopher "Drama" Pfaff, Rob's cousin, producer, owner/creator of Young & Reckless clothing
- Scott "Big Cat" Pfaff, Drama's older brother, Rob's cousin, "Facilitator", skate technician, owner/creator of Born a Lion clothing
- Geoff Taylor, general counsel for all Dyrdek related businesses
- Tracy Tubera, creative director for Wild Grinders, Rob's toy line and animated series
- Tony "Blurry" Turbo (Seasons 1–3), Fantasy Factory's maintenance man; his face is pixelated
- Jeremy Larner (Seasons 1–3), Rob's manager
- Gene Dyrdek, Rob's Dad
- Patty Dyrdek, Rob's Mom

== Episodes ==
Season	Episodes	Originally released		DVD release date (Region 1)
Season	Episodes	First released	Last released	DVD release date (Region 1)
1	12	February 8, 2009	April 26, 2009	September 1, 2009
2	9	August 27, 2009	October 22, 2009	July 6, 2010
3	12	July 12, 2010	October 4, 2010	August 9, 2011
4	10	April 4, 2011	September 19, 2011	August 28, 2012
5	12	March 19, 2012	April 23, 2012	July 24, 2012
6	9	January 16, 2014	March 13, 2014	November 14, 2014
7	9	January 1, 2015	March 5, 2015	TBA

== In popular culture ==
The factory as it appeared in earlier seasons as the surrounding area in downtown LA, was the basis of the Dyrdek's Fantasy Plaza Pack paid DLC in the 2009 skateboarding video game Skate 2 where Dyrdek also appeared as a playable skater. The factory was also featured in a Dude Perfect YouTube video that premiered on January 20, 2014 that premiered 3 days before the season 6 episode "Born A Lion" where they also made an appearance.
