= Rob & Big =

American reality television series

- Genre: Reality
- Created by: Christopher Boykin; Jeff Tremaine; Rob Dyrdek; Ruben Fleischer
- Starring: Rob Dyrdek; Christopher Boykin
- Theme music composer: Harry Nilsson
- Opening theme: "Best Friend"
- Country of origin: United States
- Original language: English
- No. of seasons: 3
- No. of episodes: 31 (list of episodes)

Production
- Executive producers: Jeff Tremaine; Rob Dyrdek; Ruben Fleischer
- Camera setup: Multiple
- Running time: 22 to 24 minutes
- Production company: Dickhouse Productions

Original release
- Network: MTV
- Release: November 2, 2006 – April 15, 2008

Related
- Rob Dyrdek's Fantasy Factory

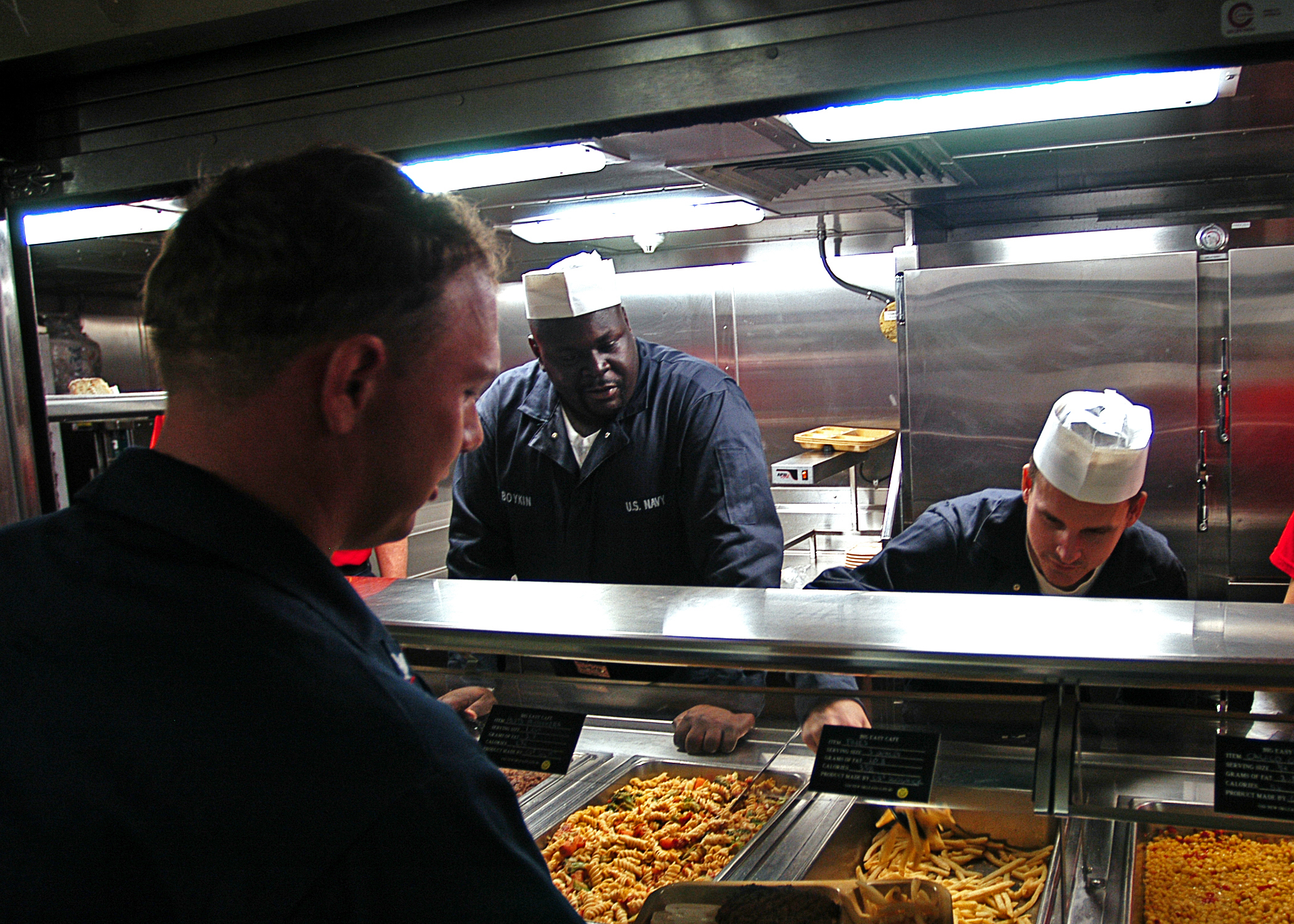
Rob & Big aboard the USS New Orleans (LPD-18) while filming an episode in 2007

Rob & Big is an American reality television series following the lives of professional skateboarder, actor, and producer Rob Dyrdek and his best friend and bodyguard Christopher "Big Black" Boykin. It premiered on November 2, 2006, and concluded on April 15, 2008, after three seasons. Reruns air on the Pluto TV channel FunnyAF, and on MTV's sister network, MTV2. The series was followed by Fantasy Factory.

== Synopsis ==
Most episodes follow a central task or event in the daily life of Rob and Big, such as attempting to break Guinness World Records, having their home exorcised, skateboarding, buying 12 remote-control helicopters, and Rob's obsession with a net gun. They purchased two animals, a mini horse named Mini Horse and a bulldog named Meaty.

Boykin broke two Guinness World Records on the show for eating the most powdered sugar doughnuts in less than three minutes, and for peeling and eating the most bananas in one minute.

== Cast ==
=== Main ===
- Rob Dyrdek – professional skateboarder
- Christopher "Big Black" Boykin – bodyguard and best friend
- Christopher "Drama" Pfaff – Rob's cousin and assistant
- Rashawn "Bam Bam" Davis – second bodyguard
- Meaty – Rob's Bulldog
- Mini Horse – Rob's Melanesian short-haired horse

=== Supporting ===
- Patricia Dyrdek – Rob's mother
- Gene Dyrdek – Rob's father
- Otis "Big Zeus" Walton – a member of Big and Bam Bam's rap group, The Chunky Boyz
- Steve Berra – Rob's friend and fellow skateboarder

== Fantasy Factory ==
A one-hour series finale situated around Rob learning that Big's longtime girlfriend is pregnant, and Big moving out of the house to become a father. Rob's cousin, Christopher "Drama" Pfaff was featured in this season. However, two years later in an interview with friend and fellow MTV star Johnny Knoxville, Dyrdek gave more reasons for having ended the show.

I think I quit real early, midway through the third season. They taxed us, you can't film reality TV for nine months, it's psycho. I think towards the end it was such was just such a grind that, really, I was ready to move on. It's like, I live on the set. You know what I mean? [The crew] had one room for a control room, [Big Black] had his room, only he didn't live there, so really it was like I lived in a one bedroom with the lights in everywhere, and just dirty from people, and it was like Pee-wee's Playhouse, and I just slowly lost it, you know, was just so sick of it.

The duo returned to MTV with the reality show, Rob Dyrdek's Fantasy Factory, which ended in 2015. Boykin died of heart failure on May 9, 2017 at age 45.

== Episodes ==
Season	Episodes	Originally released	
Season	Episodes	First released	Last released
1	8	November 2, 2006	December 21, 2006
2	8	May 22, 2007	July 10, 2007
3	15	January 8, 2008	April 15, 2008
